= Little Haiti =

Little Haiti La Petite Haïti (French) Ti Ayiti (Haitian Creole)
- Neighborhood of Miami
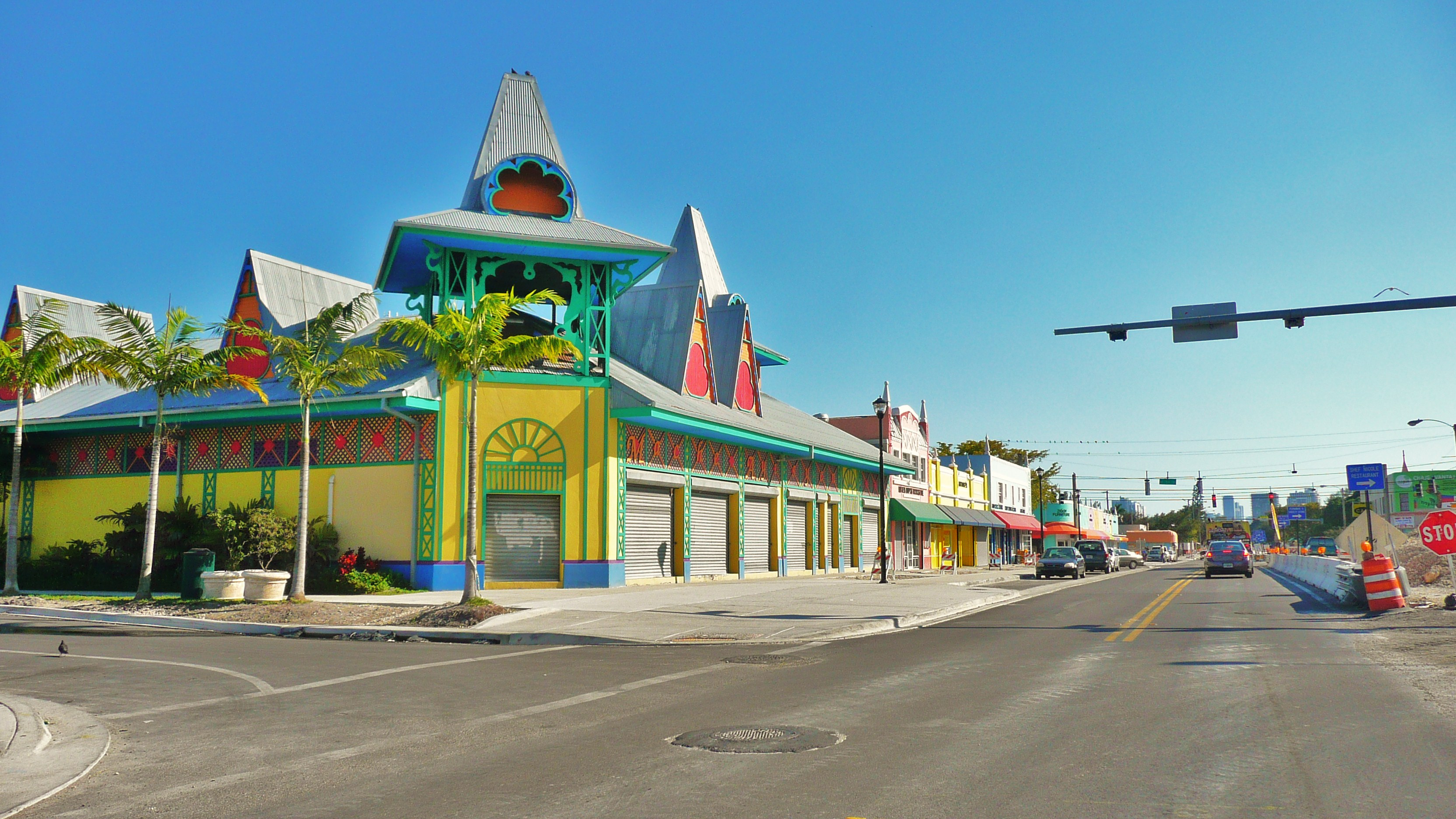
- Caribbean Marketplace

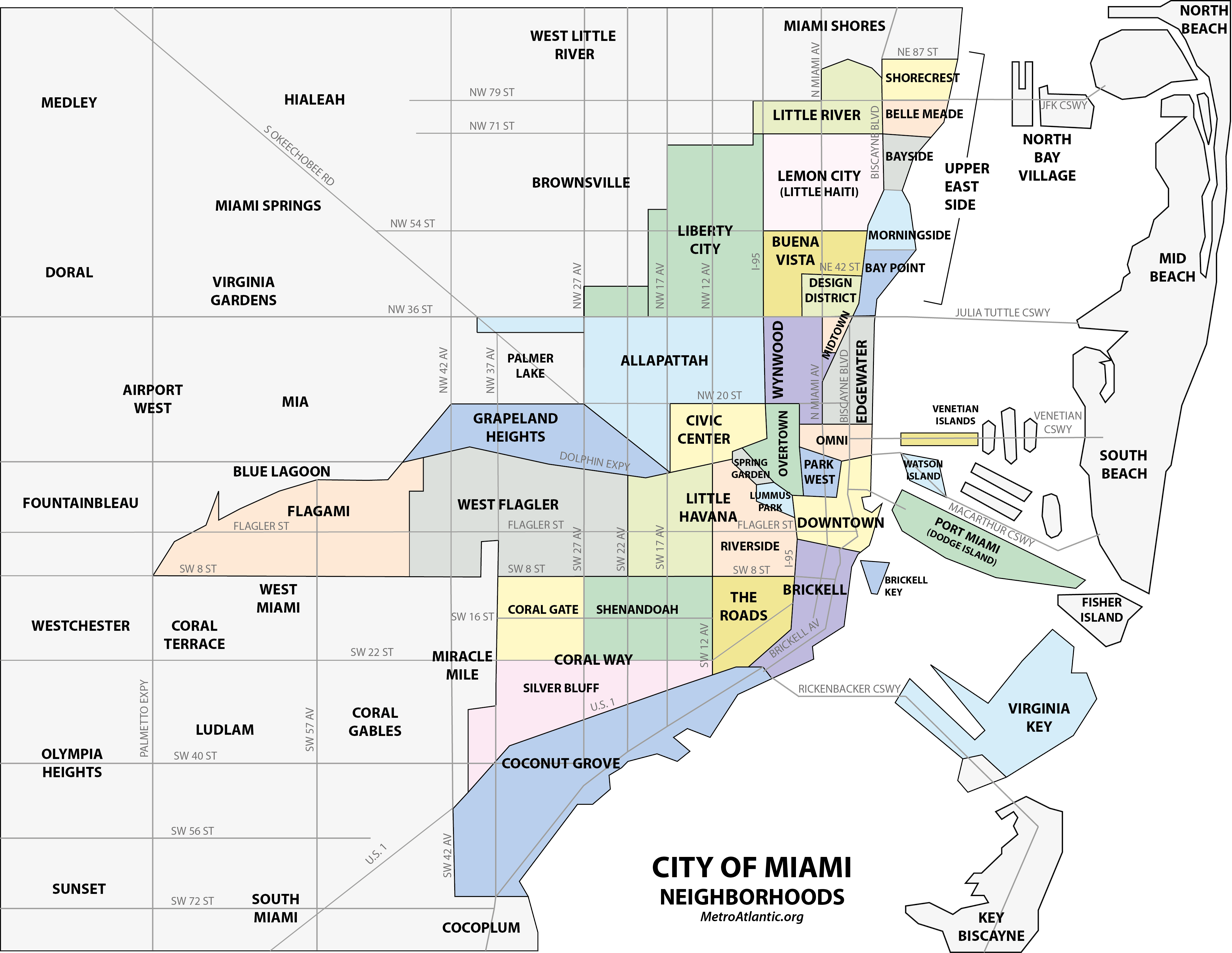
- Little Haiti neighborhood within the City of Miami
- Coordinates: 25.824385°N 80.190711°W
- Country: United States
- State: Florida
- County: Miami-Dade County
- City: Miami

Government
  - City of Miami Commissioner: Jeff Watson
  - Miami-Dade Commissioner: Audrey Edmonson
  - House of Representatives: Dotie Joseph (D) and Cynthia Stafford (D)
  - State Senate: Larcenia Bullard (D), and Oscar Braynon (D)
  - U.S. House: Frederica Wilson (D)
- Elevation: 6.9 ft (2.1 m)

Population (2010)
  - Total: 29,760
  - Density: 9,946/sq mi (3,840/km^{2})
- Time zone: UTC-05 (EST)
- ZIP code: 33127, 33137, 33138, 33150
- Area codes: 305, 786

Little Haiti (French: La Petite Haïti, Haitian Creole: Ti Ayiti) is a neighborhood of Miami, Florida, United States. It is known historically as Lemon City, Little River and Edison Center. It is home to Haitian immigrant residents, as well as residents from the rest of the Caribbean.

The area is characterized by its French–Creole designations, with its street life, restaurants, art galleries, dance, music, theatre performances, family owned enterprises, and other cultural activities.

A 13-foot bronze statue of General Toussaint L'Ouverture, the father of the Haitian Revolution, stands on N Miami Avenue and 62nd Street.

== History ==
The area now known as Little Haiti was previously called Lemon City for well over a century. Several people settled near Biscayne Bay north of the Miami River after the civil war, squatting on unclaimed land. Some of the squatters eventually applied for homestead grants for the land they were squatting on. By 1889 a community had formed, with a post office named "Motto". "Lemon City" replaced "Motto" as the name of the community by 1893. A school had opened in 1890, and Lemon City also included several businesses and a newspaper, as well as port facilities on Biscayne Bay. With the extension of the Florida East Coast Railway to Miami in 1896, Miami quickly overshadowed Lemon City.

Viter Juste, a Haitian businessman, activist and community leader, came up with the name of Little Haiti. According to Jean-Claude Exulien, a retired professor of history and friend of Juste's since 1977, Juste wrote an article in the Miami Herald in which he first referred to the neighborhood as "Little Port-au-Prince." However, editors at the Miami Herald found the name, "Little Port-au-Prince," too long, so the newspaper shortened the term in the headline to Little Haiti. Over the objections of various groups including historians, African-Americans and Bahamians, City of Miami commissioners in May 2016 voted in favor of designating Little Haiti as an official neighborhood with boundaries overlapping the historic Lemon City, which was founded by Bahamian immigrants before Miami existed.

== Borders ==
The southern border is North (NW/NE) 54th Street, west to Interstate 95 and north along the Miami city boundary on North (NW/NE) 80th Street. It then goes back down along Northeast Second Avenue.

== Demographics ==
As of 2000, Little Haiti had a population of 29,128, with 9,368 households, and 6,181 families residing in the neighborhood. The median household income was $18,887.49. The racial makeup of the neighborhood was 64.92% Black or African American, 4.78% White (non-Hispanic), 14.74% Hispanic or Latino of any race and 15.56% other races. The fastest growing group in the area is Hispanic.

The zip codes for the Little Haiti include 33127, 33137, 33138, and 33150. The area covers 3.456 square miles (8.95 km^{2}). As of 2000, there were 14,708 males and 15,357 females. The median age for males was 31.0 years old, while the median age for females was 33.8 years old. The average household size had 3.0 people, while the average family size had 3.7 members. The percentage of married-couple families (among all households) was 27.6%, while the percentage of married-couple families with children (among all households) was 13.8%, and the percentage of single-mother households (among all households) was 20.7%. 2.1% of the population were in nursing homes. The percentage of never-married males 15 years old and over was 21.7%, while the percentage of never-married females 15 years old and over was 22.0%.

== Attractions ==
=== Food ===
Rooted in the Haitian immigrants that sought refuge here in the ’80s, today Little Haiti has some Afro-Caribbean culture mixed with global trends. Restaurants in this area showcase a diversity and mix of tastes and settings. Among these cultural offerings is the Michelin-starred Boia De.

=== Culture ===
Little Haiti’s main strip is NE 2nd Avenue. Neighboring Wynwood and Design District have become popular arts and culture havens with streets lined with galleries and commercial art storefronts. In recent years, the area has been overtaken by an appreciation for high-design and street-art.

With the development of Wynwood and the Design District and the increasing prices for space in those areas, Little Haiti, Lemon City and Little River have emerged as an arts haven.

The programming at the Little Haiti Cultural Center offers local community initiatives. Located next door, The Caribbean Marketplace was designed by Charles Harrison Pawley in the style of the typical Haitian gingerbread architecture.

=== Parks ===
- Athalie Range Park (named after M. Athalie Range)
- Lemon City Park between NE 58th Terrace and NE 59th Street.
- Little Haiti Soccer Park

== Education ==
Miami-Dade County Public Schools runs area public schools. Schools within Little Haiti include:

=== Public schools ===
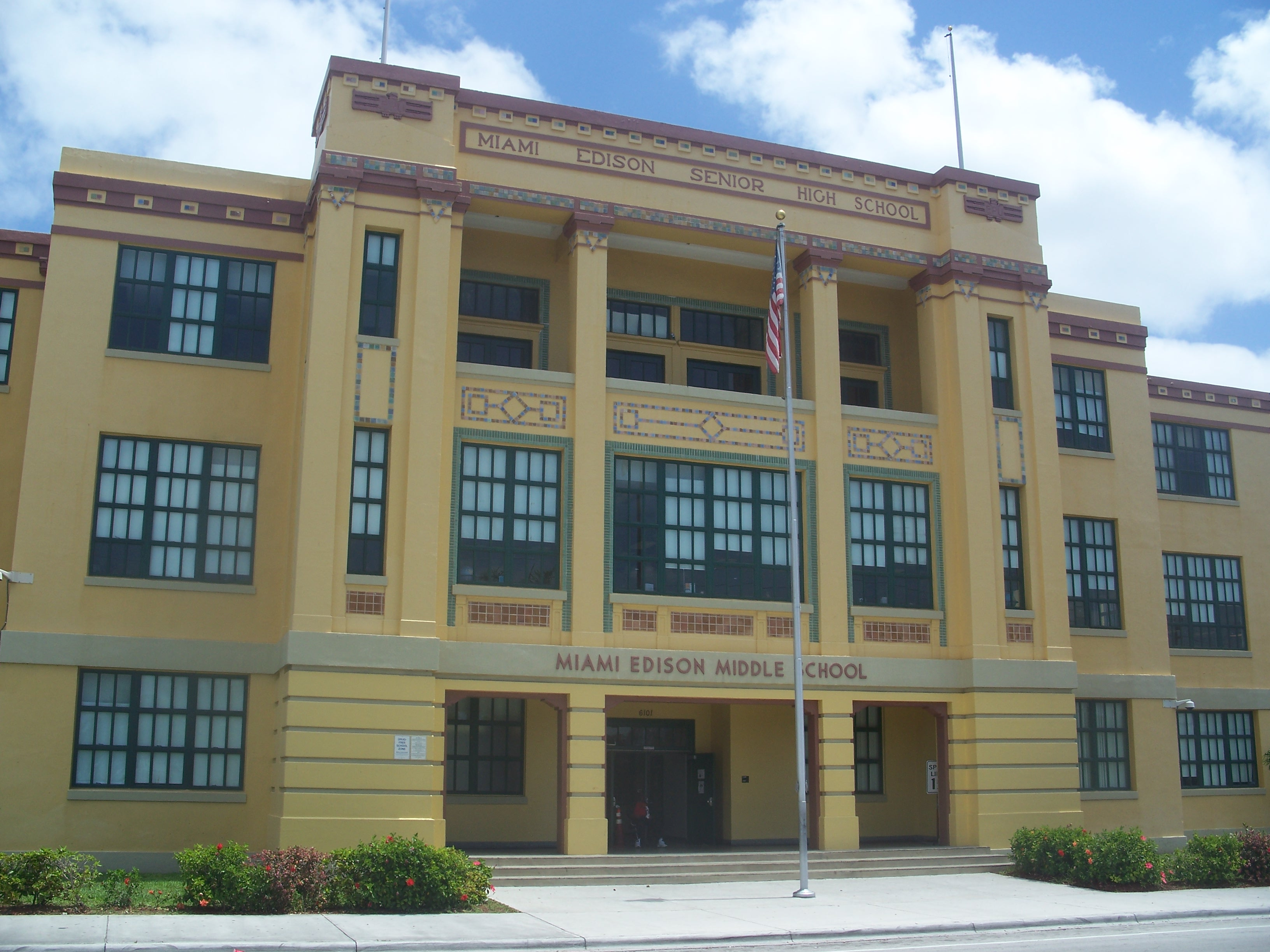
Historic Miami Edison Middle School in Edison.

Elementary schools

- Edison Park Elementary School
- Jesse J. McCrary Elementary School
- Morningside Elementary School
- Toussaint L'Ouverture Elementary School

Middle schools

- i-tech Prep Academy
- Miami Edison Middle School

High schools

- Itech @ Thomas Edison Educational Center
- Miami Edison Senior High School

=== Libraries ===
Miami-Dade Public Library System operates all area public libraries, including:

- Lemon City Branch Library
- Edison Center Library
- Little River Library

== Cultural institutions ==
- Little Haiti Cultural Complex
- Caribbean Marketplace
- Cathedral of Saint Mary
- The Haitian Cultural Arts Alliance

== See also ==
- Haiti–United States relations
- Haitian Americans
- United States and the Haitian Revolution
- Newkirk Avenue–Little Haiti station in Brooklyn, NY
- Little Haiti in East Flatbush, Brooklyn
