= Miami-Dade Public Library System =

Public library system in Florida

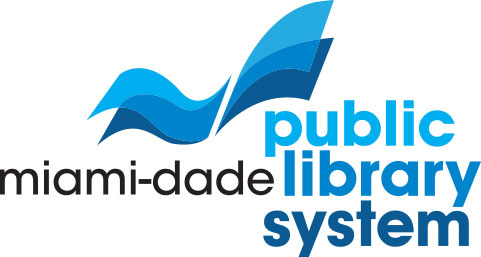
- 25.7746°N 80.1963°W
- Location: Miami-Dade County, Florida, United States
- Type: Public
- Established: 1894 (City of Mimi Public Library System); 1971
- Branches: 50 + 2 bookmobiles + 1 technobus

Collection
- Size: 3,916,631

Access and use
- Access requirements: 1,084,841
- Circulation: 6,762,294
- Population served: 2,496,435

Other information
- Website: www.mdpls.org

The Miami-Dade Public Library System (MDPLS) is a system of libraries in Miami-Dade County, Florida, United States.

== Governance ==
The Miami-Dade Public Library System is a county department within Miami-Dade county government. The Board of County Commissioners is the governing body over the library system.

The Library Advisory Board serves in an advisory capacity to the Board of County Commissioners on public library issues, providing reports, recommendations, and guidance to the government of Miami-Dade County.

== Service area ==
The service area of the Miami-Dade Public Library System is defined by the Miami-Dade Library Taxing District. The district includes the majority of the geographical boundaries of Miami-Dade County, including most of its 35 municipalities and all of unincorporated Miami-Dade County. The Miami-Dade Public Library System includes 50 libraries, two bookmobiles and one technobus. Along with its own branches, the Miami-Dade Public Library System also allows patrons of public libraries in the cities of Hialeah, Homestead, North Miami, and North Miami Beach to use MDPLS services.

== History ==
=== Early years ===
==== Public school library and Lemon City Library ====
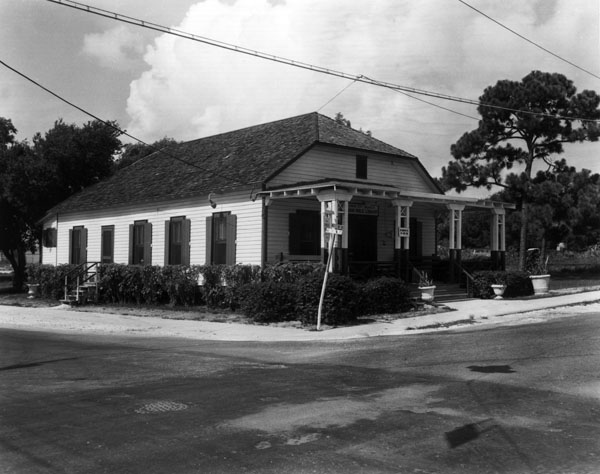
Street view of Lemon City Branch Library circa 1955 - 412 NE 61st Street location

The Miami-Dade Public Library System can trace its roots to April 7, 1894 with the opening of a reading room in Lemon City. One library was opened in the Lemon City public school, while in 1902, the Lemon City Library opened at 412 NE 61st Street. The Lemon City Library Association was established on February 4. 1902. The occasion took place at the house of Mrs. Cornelia Keys and was attended by the Village Improvement Association, which was founded in 1896 by the city’s leading ladies, who were instrumental in the development of the Lemon City Library Association. The Lemon City Library, like its counterpart in Coconut Grove, also operated as a circulation or subscription library.

==== Coconut Grove Library ====
On June 15, 1895, the Pine Needles Club opened the Coconut Grove Library. Louise Whitfield Carnegie donated books to help the library after she visited Coconut Grove and attended a Pine Needles Club meeting. In 1897, the library occupied a storeroom called the Exchange Library. In the 1900s, Ralph Munroe, the commodore of the Biscayne Bay Yacht Club, donated land for the construction of a new library, with the condition that the grave of his wife Mrs. Eva Amelia Hewitt Munroe, who died in 1882 would be maintained on the site in perpetuity. The library structure was donated by writer and conservationist Kirk Munroe.

On October 26, 1900, the Coconut Grove Library Association was incorporated. By March 6, 1901 Miami-Dade County's first library building had been built in Coconut Grove and was occupied. It remained in service until 1957, when it became part of the Miami Public Library.

On November 16, 1963, a two-story library designed by local architect T. Triplett Russell opened and is a designated Florida Heritage Site.

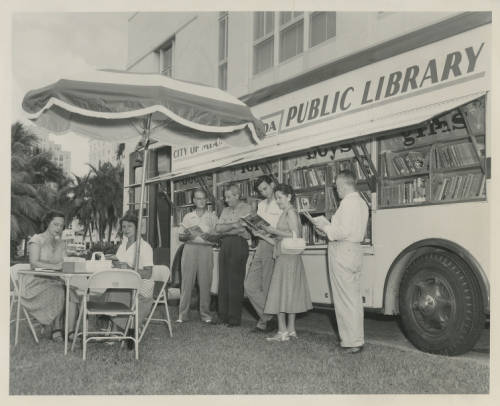
Miami Public Library Traveling Branch

==== Flagler Memorial Library ====
In 1913, Henry Morrison Flagler donated land for a Miami Women's Club clubhouse with the provision that it contain a public reading room. In 1915, the Miami City Commission began allocating $50 per month to support the club. The Flagler Memorial Library was established at 1737 North Bayshore Drive. By 1925, the communities of Coconut Grove and Lemon City had been annexed into the city of Miami.

==== Bookmobiles ====
On January 5, 1928, Miami's first bookmobile was pictured in the Miami Herald. The first bookmobiles served rural areas of the city and county where access to library was nonexistent. In 1979, at the height of the program, about 20 bookmobiles were in service with about 293,000 items in circulation, but by 2001 two bookmobiles remained. Due to Covid-19, program has been relived and now the bookmobile makes weekly stops around parts of the city from Hialeah to Cutler Bay. It makes scheduled stops each week at public parks, childcare facilities, condominium complexes, retirement communities, senior centers and recreational facilities where people might not have access to a brick and mortar library. In 2022, the Miami-Dade Public Library System had two Bookmobiles and one Technobus.

Along with books, DVDs, CDs and Audiobooks, Bookmobile patrons can now also borrow Chromebook laptops, tablets, and Wi-Fi hotspots. The Technobus offers computers on wheels where patrons can delve into digital photography, music production, graphic design, 3D printing, drone flying and virtual reality.

==== The Dunbar Library ====
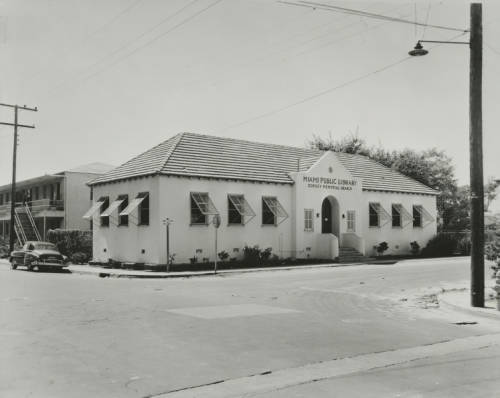
Street view of Dorsey Memorial Library

In 1936, Paul Laurence Dunbar Library opened in a building donated by Annie Coleman, president of the Friendship Garden and Civic Club, to serve citizens of Overtown. In 1938, the facility was made part of Miami's library system and renamed the Dunbar Branch Library. This was the first public library serving the Black community.

On August 13, 1941, the Dorsey Memorial Library opened on land donated by Black philanthropist Dana A. Dorsey. It was the second library opened to serve the African American community in Overtown. It was also the first library built specifically to be a library, and the first library building owned by the city, serving the public until 1961. The Dorsey Memorial Library was then moved to a new larger facility and renamed the Dixie Park Branch Library.

=== Unification ===
In 1942, there were seven independent libraries. That year, all of them merged into one system, the Miami Public Library System. In 1945 it officially became a department of the City of Miami governed by a board of trustees.

When the Miami Memorial Library was constructed at Bayfront Park in 1951, it became the Miami Public Library's Main Library, and served as the department's central library until 1985.

A subscription library in Coconut Grove became part of the system in April 1957. Eight branches were constructed in the next eight years. In December 1965, the city of Miami began providing public library service to unincorporated Dade County and municipalities that did not have a library service. Coral Gables, South Miami and the Miami Springs library were included in the system. Four bookmobiles provided library service to the unincorporated area.

In 1961, the Dorsey Library was abandoned for the Dixie Park Branch Library, which was renamed the Culmer/Overtown Branch Library in 1983.

On November 1, 1971, the city of Miami transferred its library system to Metropolitan Dade County, which created a new department of libraries.

Homestead's public library joined the county system on January 1, 1975. The Hispanic Branch, Rama Hispanica, opened August 2, 1976 in Little Havana.

On November 7, 1972, 14 new libraries were constructed when $34.7 million was authorized for land acquisition and the construction, renovation, equipment and furnishings of public libraries.

1972 was considered the kick start of the “decade of progress” for the library system. Voters approved a bond of $553 million initiative to building projects, branches and other beneficial constructions throughout the city.

The Miami Beach Public Library and its two branches became part of the Miami-Dade Public Library System in October 1986. On January 15, 1992, the world's first library on an elevated transit system opened at the Metrorail rapid transit system in the Civic Center Station.

In 1997, the Miami-Dade Public Library system launched their website, expanding its catalogue and reach.

=== 2000-2021 ===
The Doral Branch Library, the Country Walk Branch Library and the Hialeah Gardens library were opened in the early 2000s. In 2003, branches opened in Naranja, Tamiami and Lakes of the Meadow. In 2004, libraries opened in Concord and Palm Springs North. A regional library opened on Miami Beach in 2005, as did branches in Sunny Isles Beach and California Club. The Opa-Locka, Sunset and Golden Glades branches opened in 2007, and branches at International Mall, Kendale Lakes and Virrick Park in Coconut Grove opened in 2008. Pinecrest opened in October 2008 and the Arcola Lakes Branch Library opened in 2011.

In 2012, the library system experienced a 30 percent cut in its budget, forcing the elimination of 153 part-time positions and a 25 percent reduction in full-time staff. Following this, the Blue Ribbon Taskforce for the Miami-Dade Public Library System was formed to create a long-term plan for the libraries budget.

The Miami-Dade Public Library System is a subregional library of the Florida Bureau of Braille and Talking Books Library.

In July 2014, a restructuring of the Miami-Dade tax schedule resulted in a $22 million increase in the county library budget. In 2014, Miami-Dade County amended the county charter allowing Miami-Dade public libraries to be located in public parks. The Northeast Branch Library in Aventura opened on August 17, 2015. The library system's 50th branch location opened in the Town of Bay Harbor Islands in December 2016.

In 2017, the Miami-Dade Public Library was awarded Library Services and Technology Act grants to digitize its archives. In 2024, the Miami-Dade Public Library System was awarded Library of the Year by the Florida Library Association.

The City of Homestead constructed a new library facility in Homestead and withdrew from the Miami-Dade Public Library System. The City and the County did enter into a reciprocal borrowing agreement. The new facility, named Cybranium, offers virtual reality, 3D printing, children’s theater, and a brand new collection of library books among other services. Despite the change, both cities continue to work together to encourage residents to take part in the library system.

The Hialeah Gardens Branch Library opened on February 11, 2021.

The COVID-19 pandemic began in 2020 and changed the library system in huge ways. New ideas and perspectives on accessibility, health practices and employment services were launched. On July 16, 2021, MDPLS launched their Miami-Dade Public Libraries at Your Door program, allowing patrons to receive books in the mail free of charge. In June 2023, the MDPLS announced summer programming aimed at promoting fun, literacy, education, and nutrition. These include the 2023 Summer Reading Challenge which encouraged residents of all ages to read for fun and prizes; a Homework Help & Tutoring Program which offered free 60-minute tutoring sessions in reading, math, and science for students in grades K-12; Free Lunch at the Library which provided free nutritious lunches to children; and MDPLS Adult Learning Academy which offered free language courses in English and Spanish, as well as U.S. citizenship classes for adults. On April 7, 2022, MDPLS announced their Mobile Device Lending program. This allowed for patrons to check out mobile devices from the library as a part of the Community Internet Connectivity Initiative Mobile Device Lending Program. MDPLS also became a fine free library system. These programs highlight MDPLS's commitment to serving diverse needs in the community, from educational support to nutritional well-being, making a significant impact on the lives of Miami-Dade County residents.

== Awards ==
- 1989. Gale Research Co. Financial Development Award
- National Medal for Museum and Library Service awarded on October 8 at the White House
- 2017. Awarded Library Services and Technology Act grants to digitize archives
- 2024. Library of the Year by the Florida Library Association
- 2024. Best in Category achievement award from the National Association of Counties (NACo) for creating autism-friendly spaces in libraries
