= Lincoln Memorial Park =

Cemetery in Miami, Florida, USA

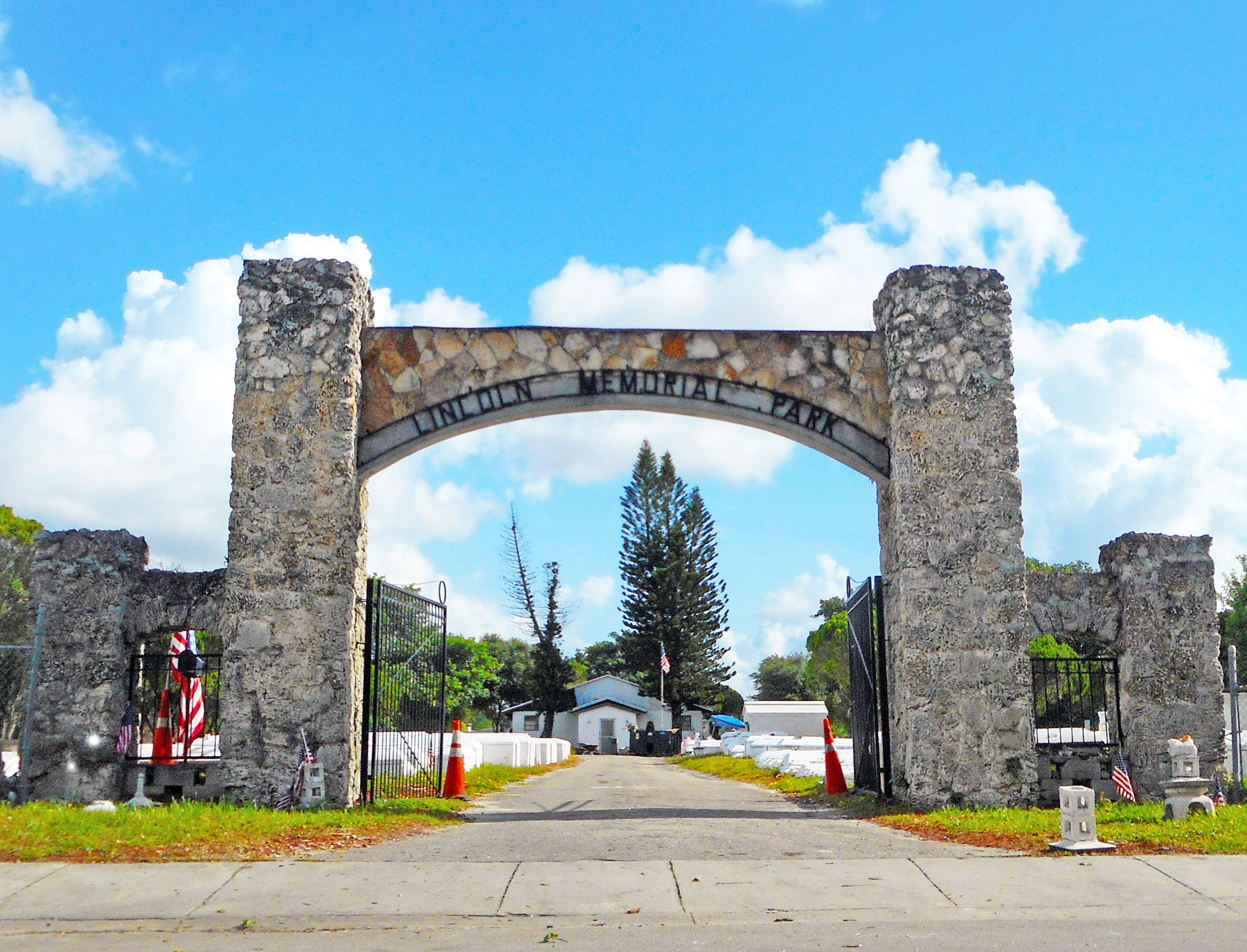
- Entrance to the Lincoln Memorial Park
- Interactive map of Lincoln Memorial Park

Details
- Established: 1924
- Location: 3001 NW 46th St, Miami, FL 33142
- Country: United States
- Coordinates: 25.81670°N 80.24580°W
- Style: Above ground vaults
- Owned by: Jessie Wooden (current)
- Size: 20 acres
- No. of graves: 30,000 plots
- Find a Grave: Lincoln Memorial Park

Lincoln Memorial Park is a historic African-American cemetery in the Brownsville neighborhood of un-incorporated Miami-Dade, Florida.

== History ==
Lincoln Memorial Park was first used as a graveyard in 1924 on land owned by a F.B. Miller (a white realtor). In 1929, the burial ground was purchased by Kelsey Pharr, who was a black funeral director. Mr. Pharr was a native of South Carolina, who had studied embalming in Boston and had moved to Miami in the early 1900s. He was a philanthropist and served as consul to Liberia. After his death in 1964, the cemetery passed on to his goddaughter Elyn Johnson, and then to Jessica Williams, the latter's niece. In 2017, Williams partnered with the Coral Gables Museum in an ongoing restorative effort.

The layout of the cemetery is of the above the ground burial style which is very popular in locations at or below sea level and are prone to flooding, just like Evergreen Memorial Cemetery a few blocks away and the Charlotte Jane Memorial Park Cemetery in Coconut Grove.

Some of Miami's most noted African-Americans are buried in Lincoln Memorial Park:

- Kelsey Phar, first owner of the cemetery; (died 1964)
- H.E.S. Reeves, founder of the Miami Times, the county's oldest Black-owned newspaper; (died 1970)
- Gwen Cherry, the first African-American woman to serve as a state legislator in Florida; (died 1979)
- Dana A. Dorsey, Miami's first Black millionaire; (died 1940)
- Rev. John Culmer, rector of the Historical St. Agnes Episcopal Church in Overtown; (died 1963)

== Current status ==
Lincoln Memorial Park, Sections A and B, are owned by Jessie Wooden. He purchased the derelict cemetery 21 Dec 2020 from Jessica F Williams.

Wooden is restoring Lincoln Memorial Park to its original glory and is now interring new souls.

== Gallery ==
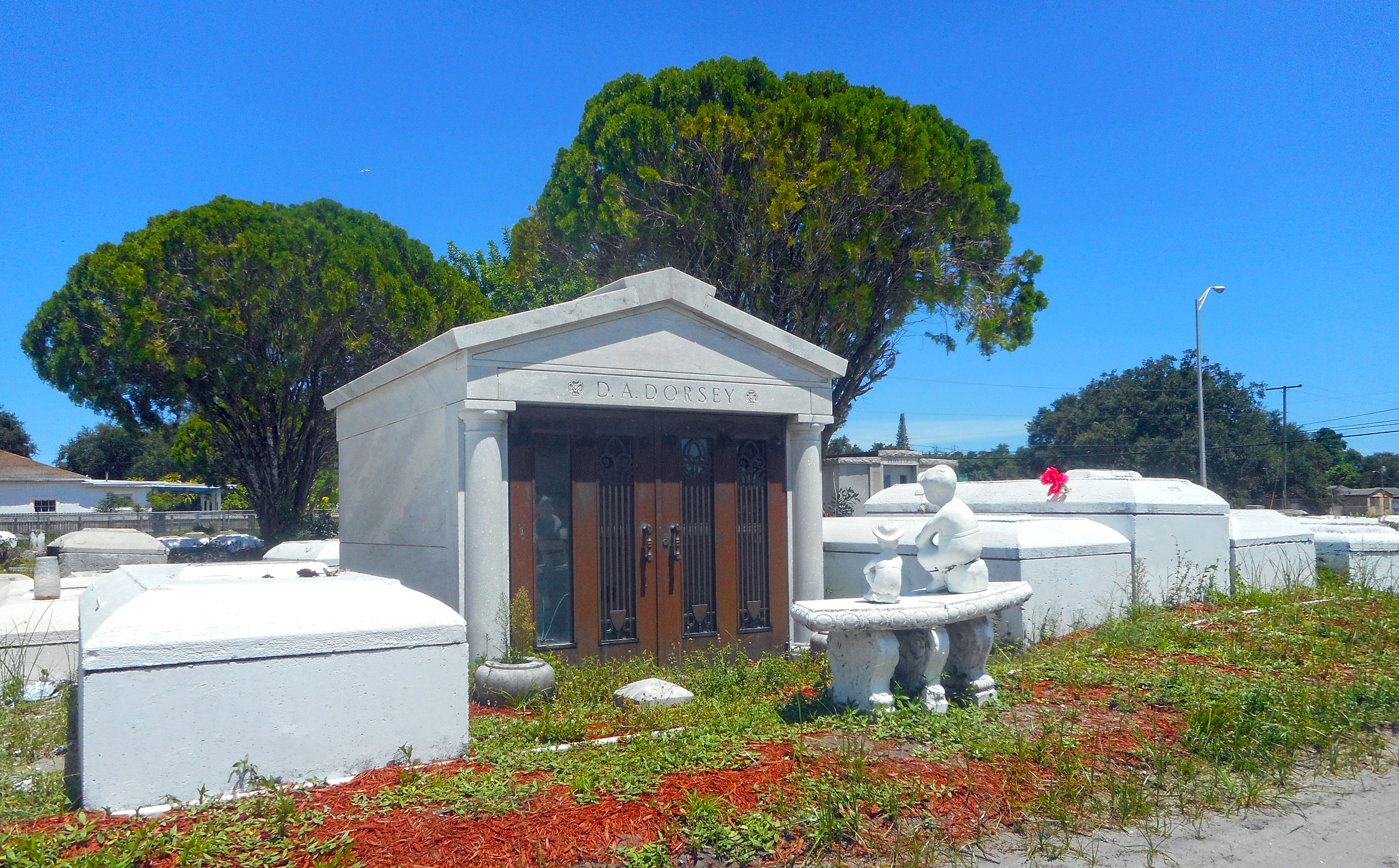
Dana Dorsey Mausoleum

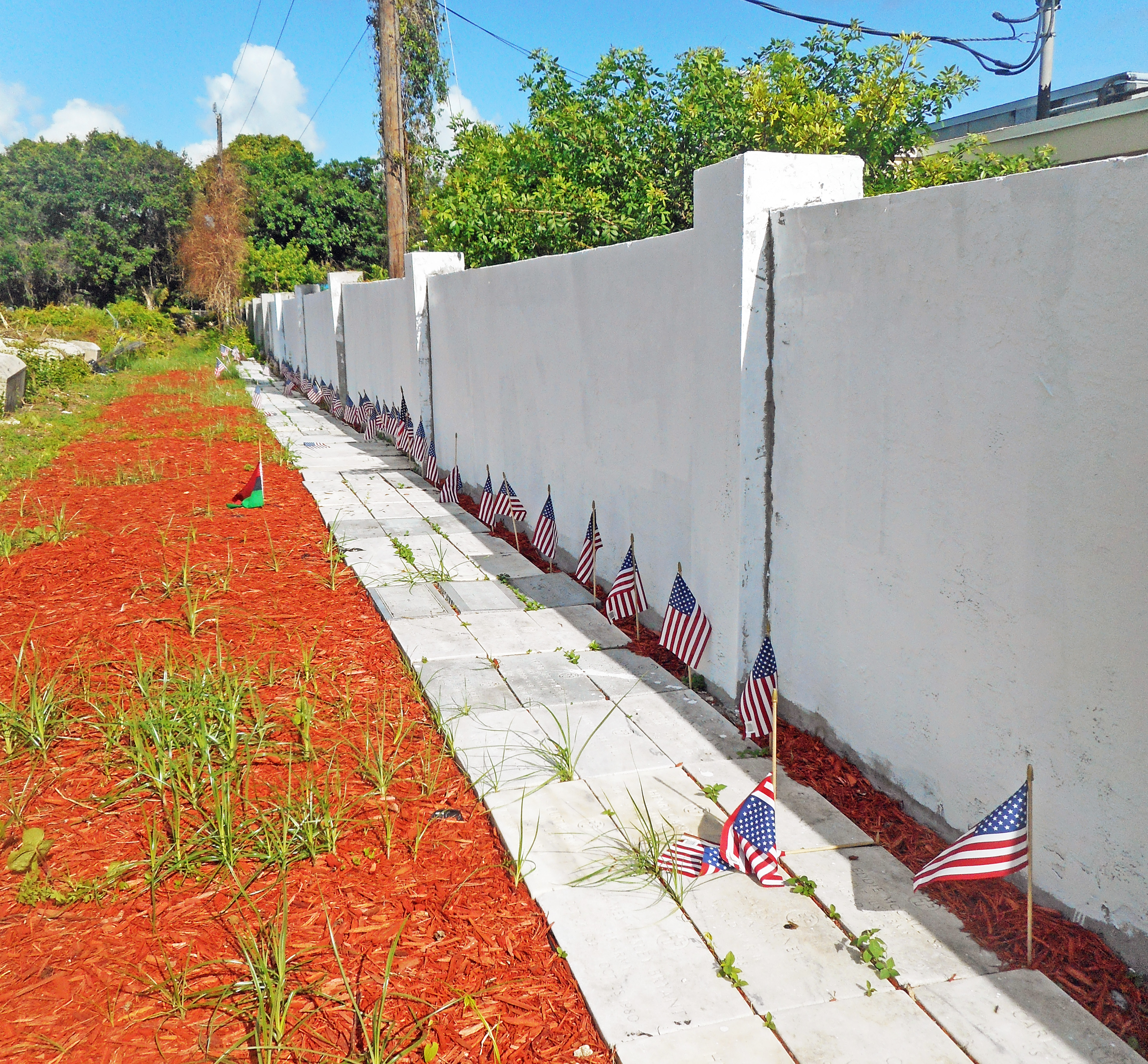
Military graves of African-Americans

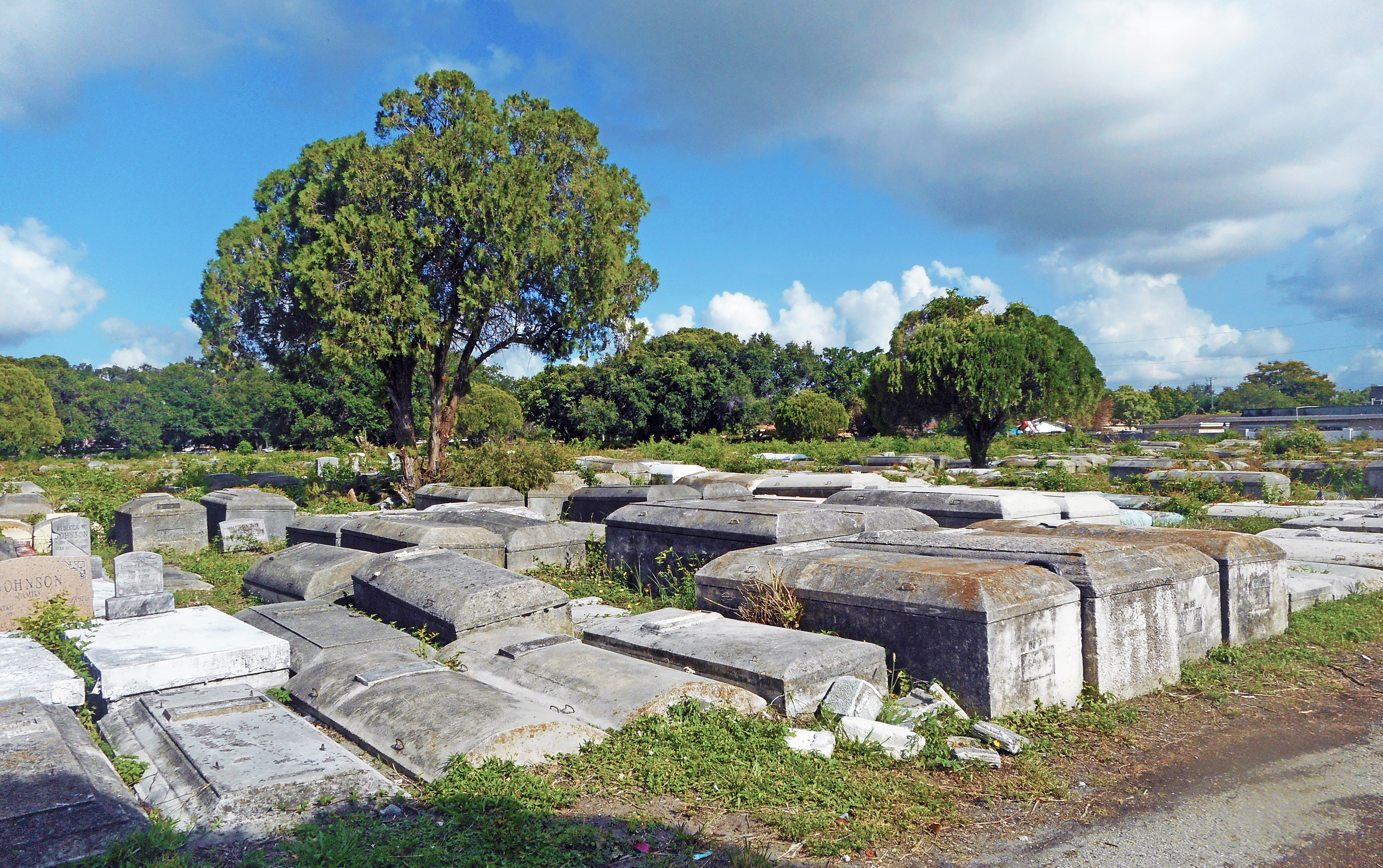
General view of graves

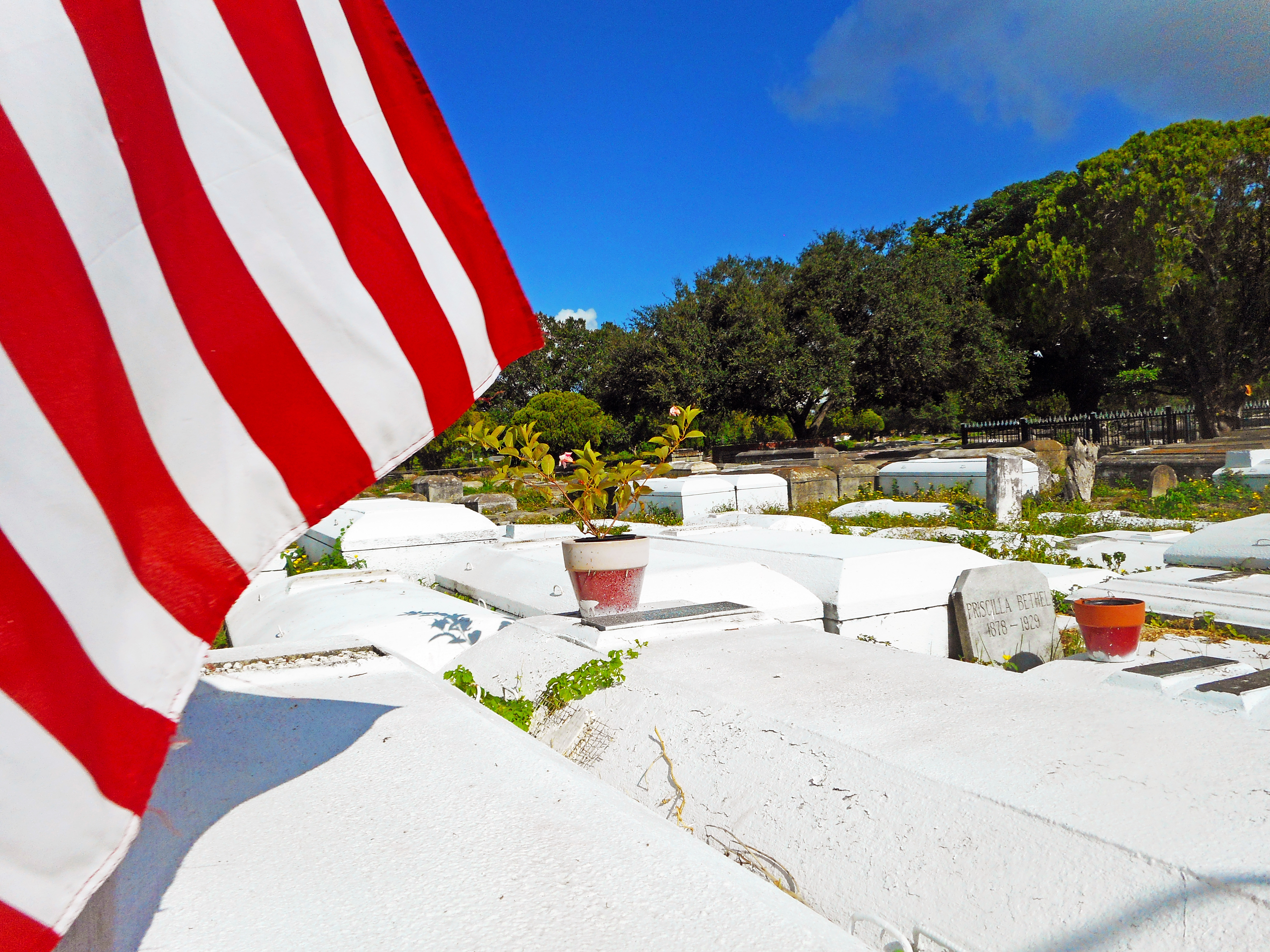
American flag flying next to caskets

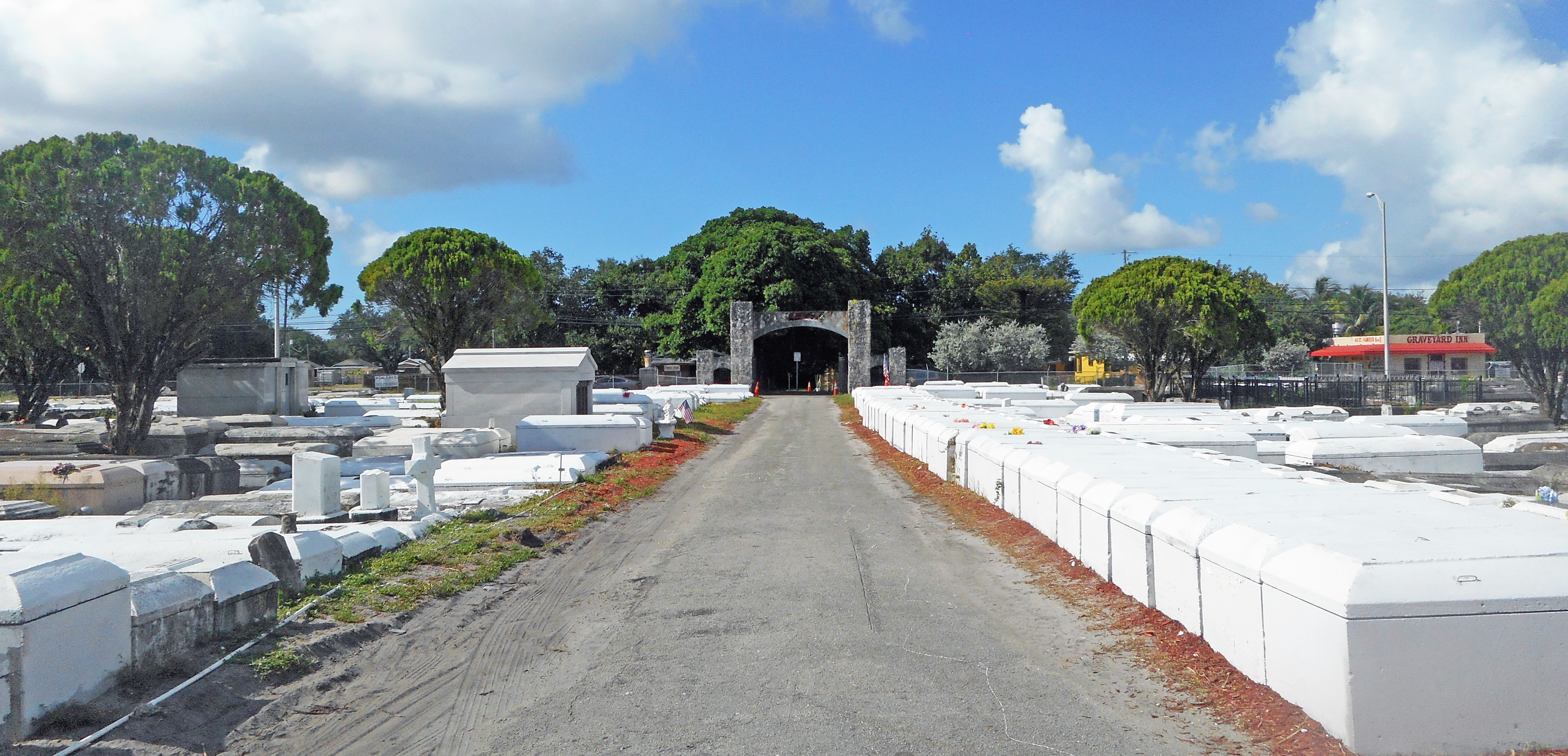
Entrance gate and main road

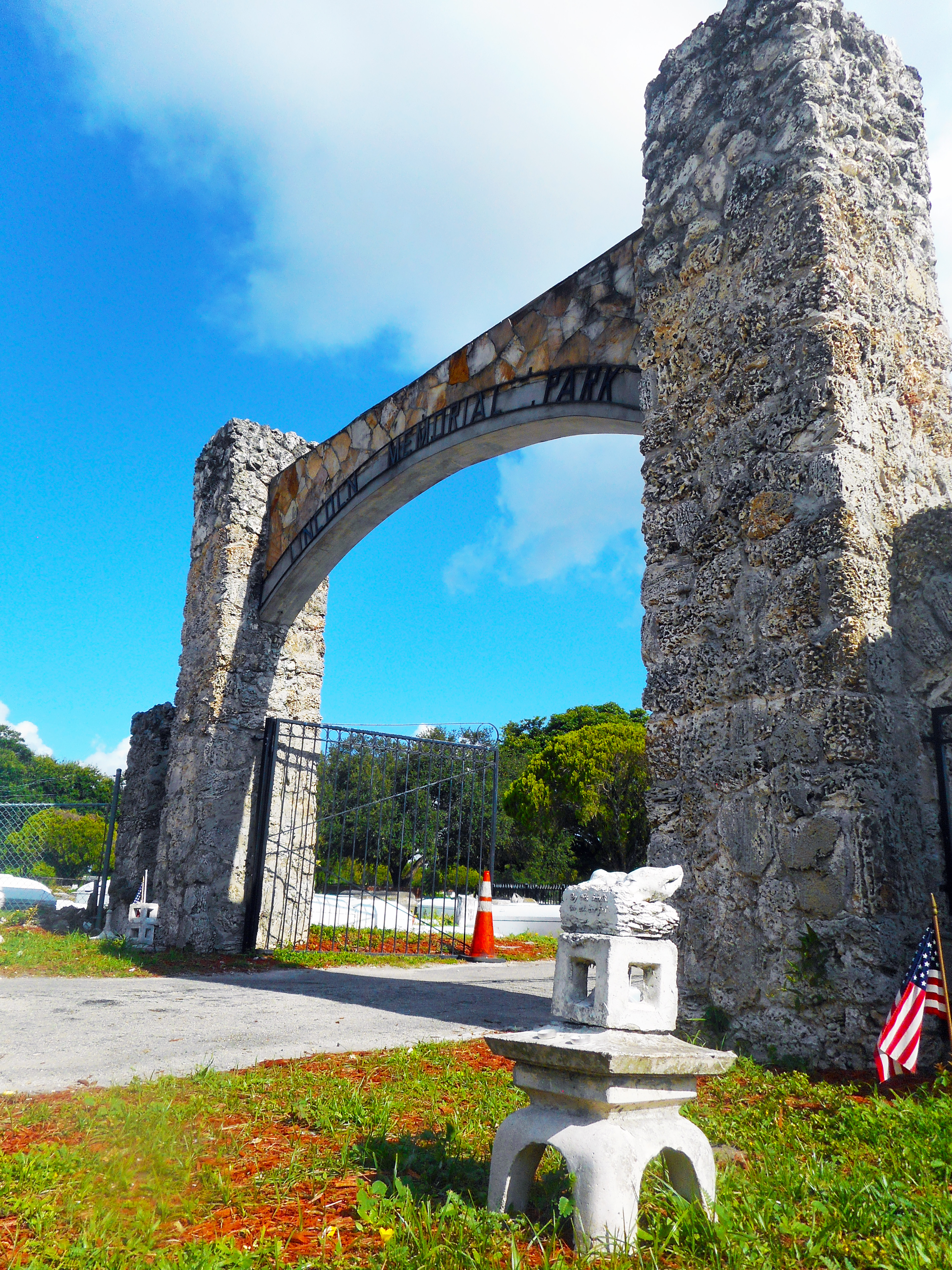
Entrance

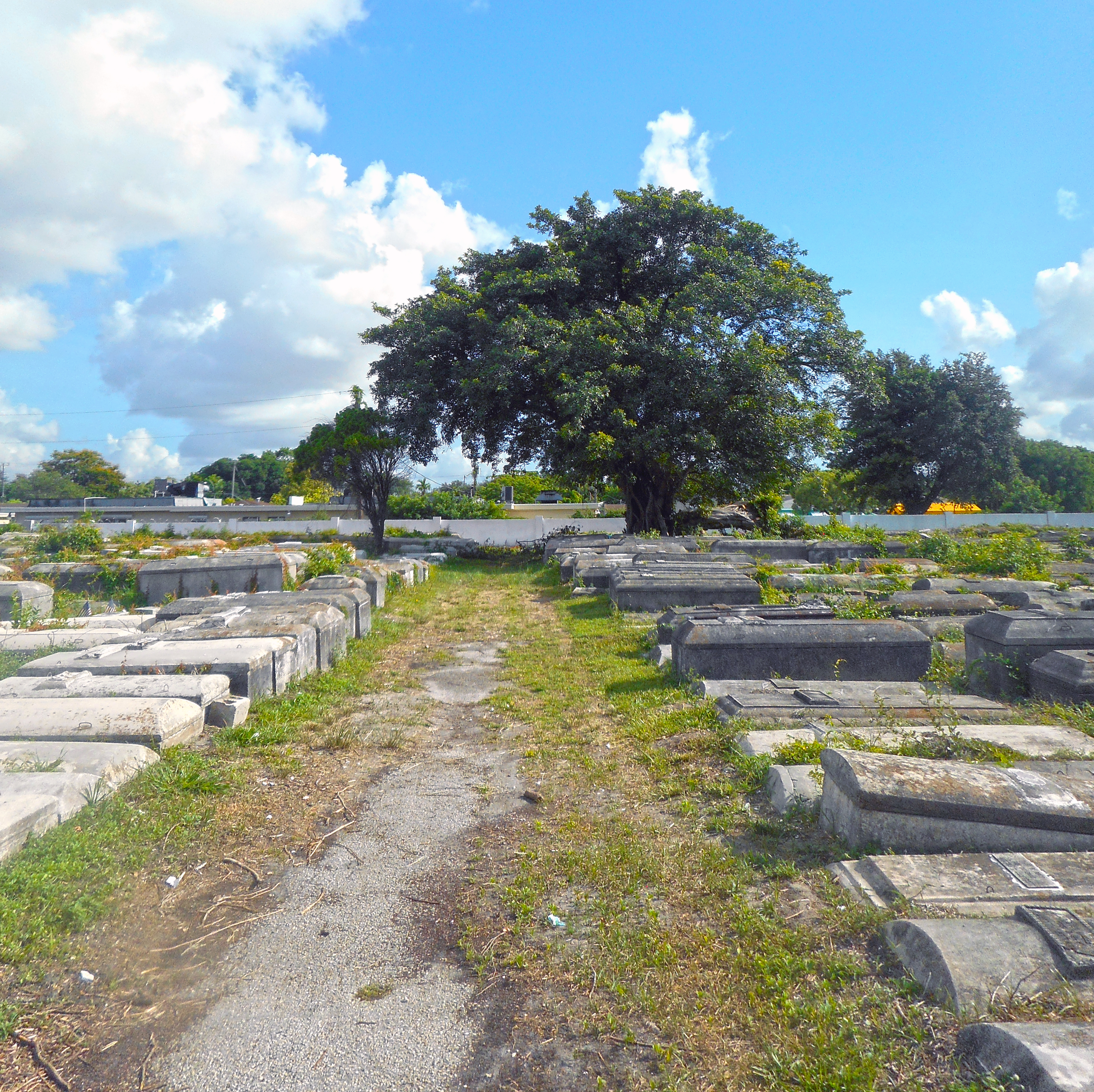
North wall (north)

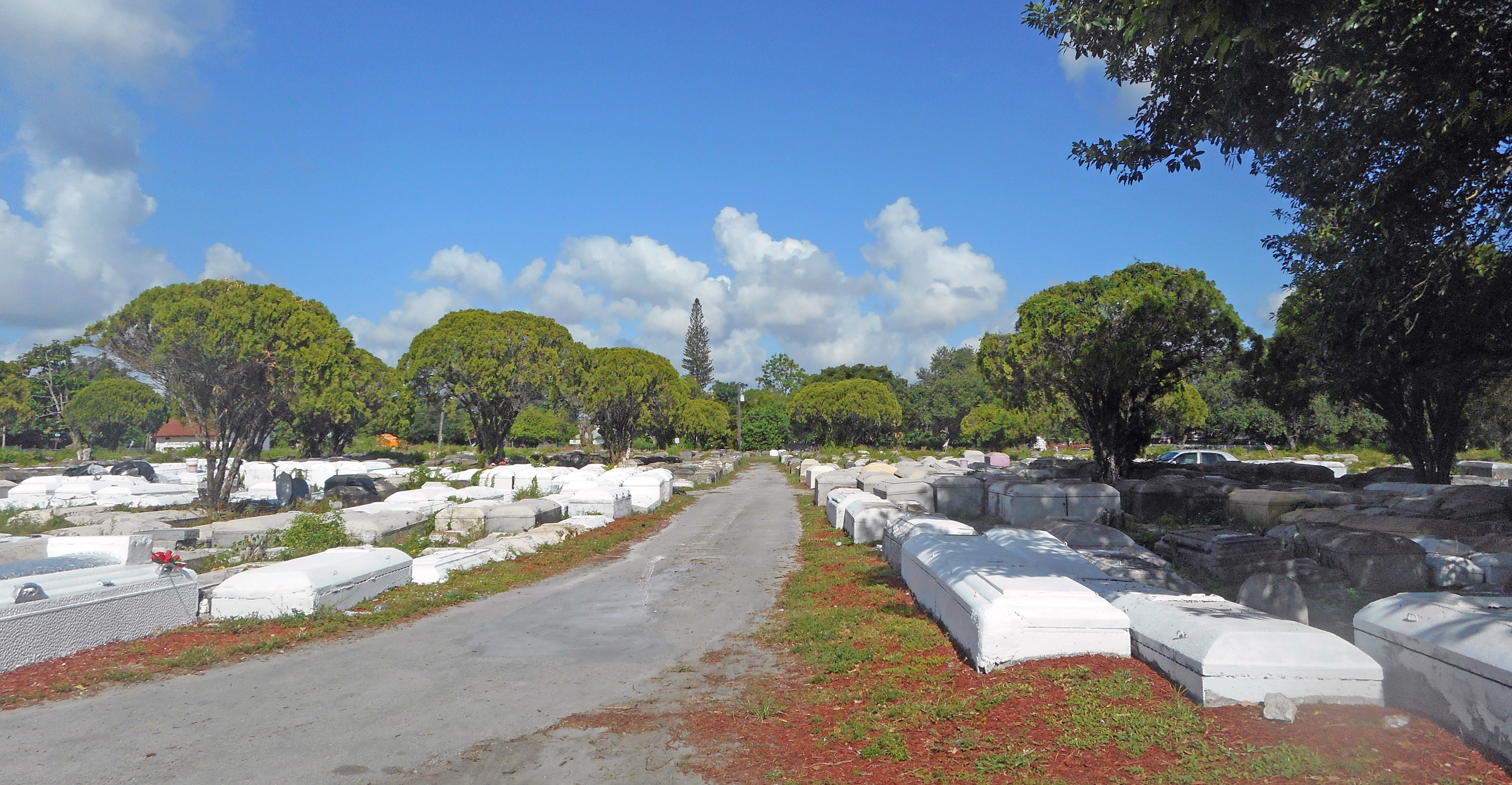
View west road

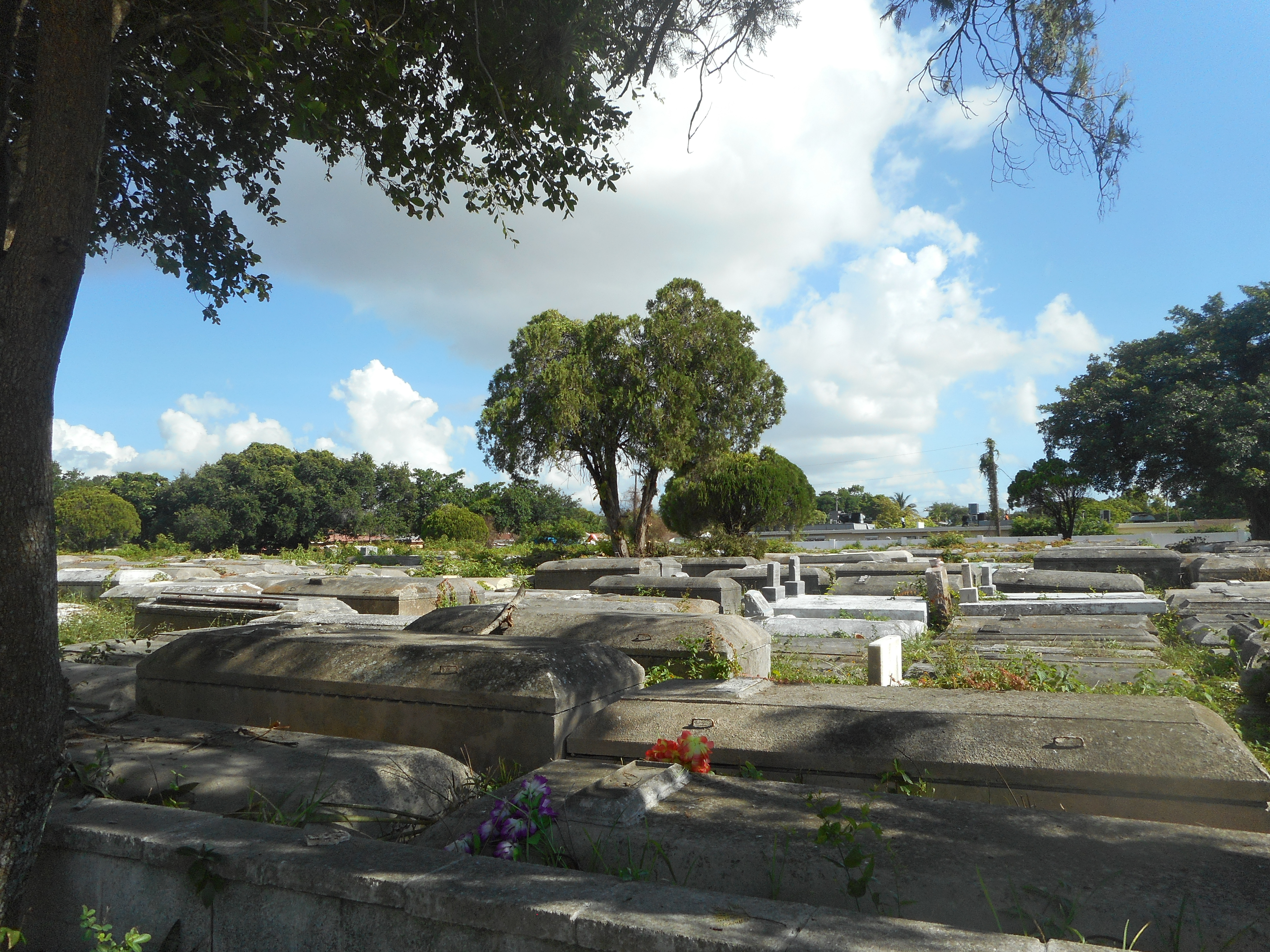
Caskets

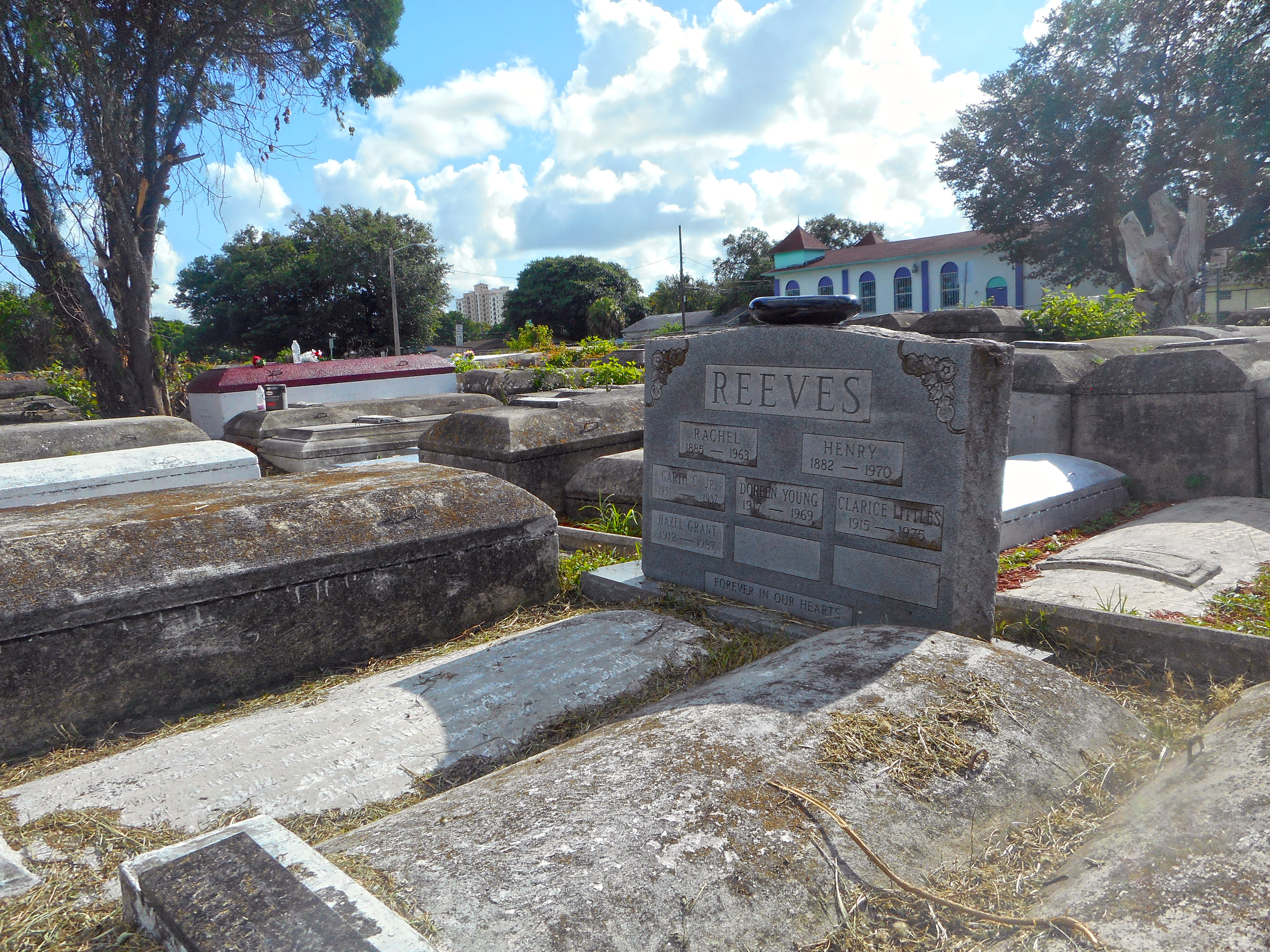
Reeves Family grave

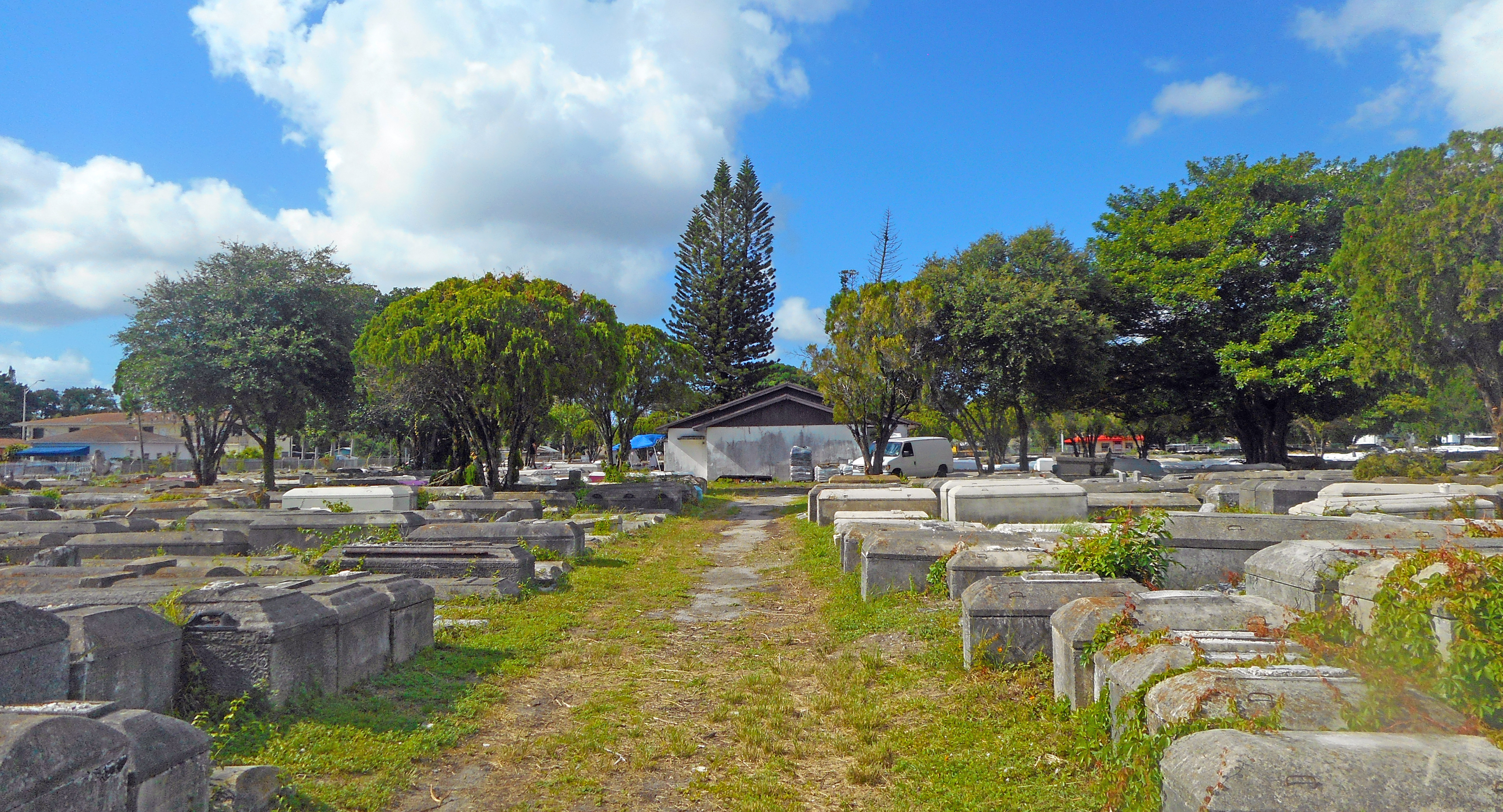
View of chapel from rear wall of cemetery

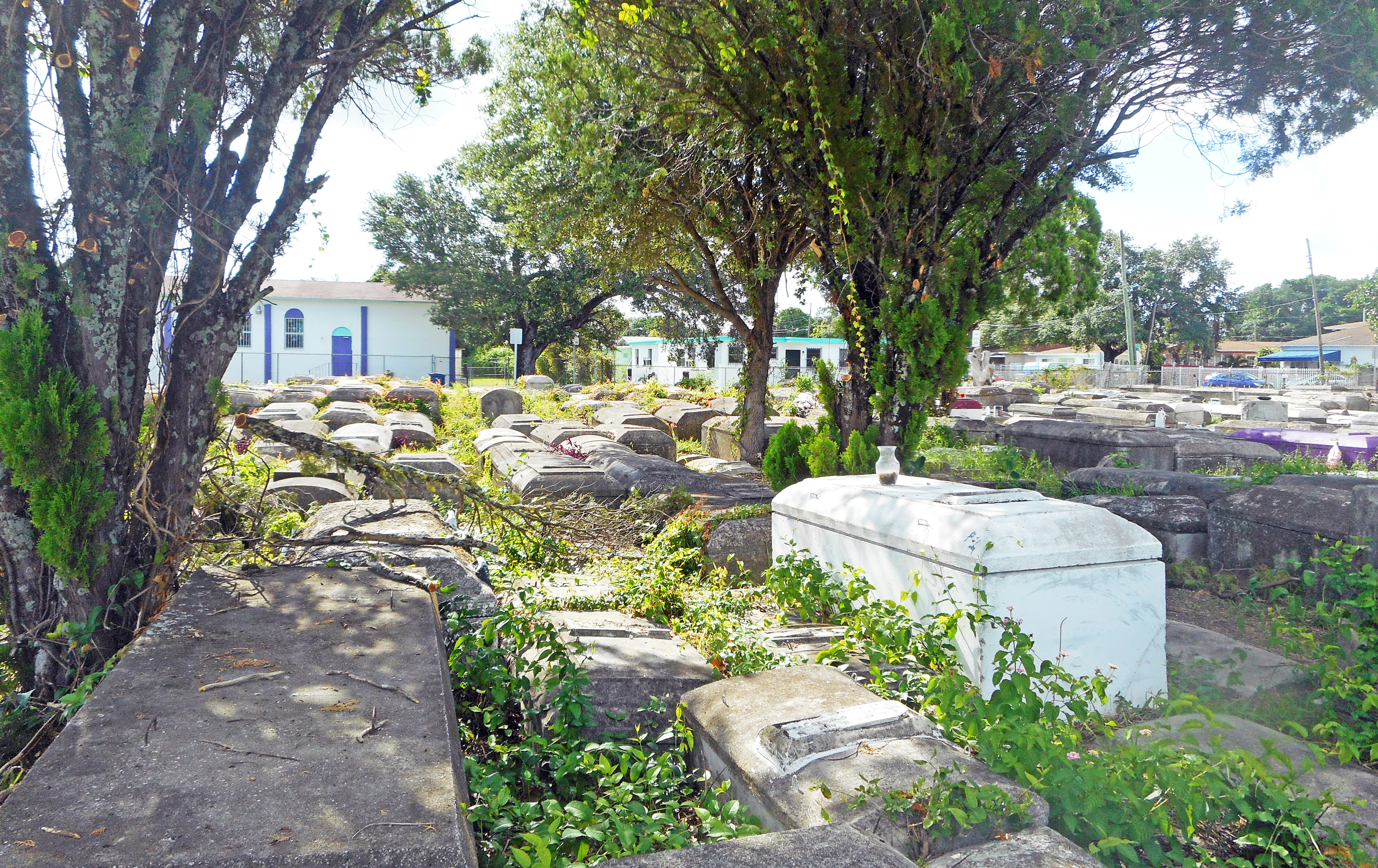
View of concrete vaults
