= Evergreen Memorial Cemetery (Miami, Florida) =

Cemetery in Miami, Florida

Coordinates: 25°48′50″N 80°14′44″W

Evergreen Memorial Cemetery is a cemetery in Miami, Florida. The historically Black cemetery is in the Allapattah neighborhood and is bound by NW 43rd Terrace to the north, NW 41 Street to the south and NW 31st avenue to the west. It is one of the oldest cemeteries for African Americans in Miami-Dade County.

== History ==
In July 1913, T. O. Wilson, N. M. Hart, and Clifton D. Benson published a notice of their intention to apply for letters patent for the Evergreen Cemetery Company. In September of that year, a newspaper ad announced that construction on the Evergreen Cemetery for Colored People was to begin in two days on 29 September and a trust fund was to be established for perpetual care. In 1928, T. O. Wilson was still the President of the cemetery and J. E. Junkin, its Vice-President.

However, it was not until 1932 that the cemetery was reportedly certified as a cemetery.

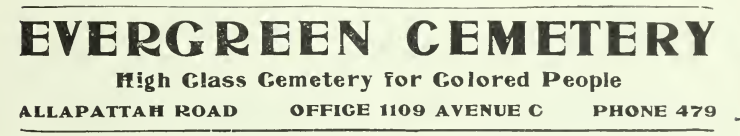
City Directory Ad (1928)

The cemetery was owned by undertaker, Benjamin Solomon when he died in 1937. After his death, his wife Capitola sold the cemetery to Tropical Home Builders. In 1976, the cemetery was donated by a law firm to the Greater Tabernacle Baptist Church. It was sold to Iowan, John Wagoner, in 1989. In 1990, it was purchased by Molly and Bernard Zaminsky. After the pair filed for bankruptcy, it was purchased in 1994 by Garth Reeves, the editor of the Miami Times who had been interested in buying the cemetery since as early as 1983.

In 1991, the cemetery was designated an historical site.

== Burials ==
Most of the deceased are interred in above-ground vaults. A number of African-American police officers are buried at the cemetery, including Victor Butler Jr, Johnnie Young, one of the city's first black cops, and Simmons Arrington. Lincoln Memorial Park, another cemetery for African Americans, opened in 1924 several blocks away.

The cemetery was adjacent to land owned by the Dade County School Board and, in 1980, the school board discovered that a local mortician was burying bodies on the school board's land rather than on cemetery land. At the time, the cemetery was almost at capacity. However, in 1983, burials were still taking place in the cemetery.

== Problems ==
At times, the cemetery has suffered from reports of poor upkeep. The issues are not unique to the cemetery, with city councils taking over the upkeep of some old historical cemeteries.

In recent years, Evergreen has also been a target for vandals.
