= Miami Edison Senior High School =

Coordinates: 25°49′54″N 80°12′17″W

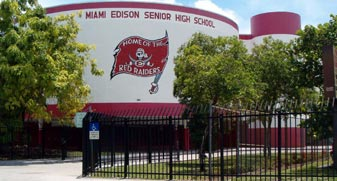

Location
- 6161 Northwest 5th Court; Little Haiti, Miami, Florida 33127; United States

Information
- School type: Public, high school
- Established: 1930
- School district: Miami-Dade County Public Schools
- Principal: Leon P. Maycock
- Staff: 39.00 (FTE)
- Grades: 9–12
- Enrollment: 631 (2023–2024)
- Student to teacher ratio: 16.18
- Campus type: Urban
- Colors: Red, Gray and Black
- Mascot: Red Raider
- Team name: Red Raiders
- Yearbook: Beacon
- Website: edison.dadeschools.net

Miami Edison High School is a secondary school located at 6161 NW 5 Ct. in the Little Haiti neighborhood of Miami, Florida, United States. It is part of the Miami-Dade County Public Schools system. Its provost is Leon Maycock.

Miami Edison is an inner-city school. As of 2011, it is known for historically having the largest Haitian-American student population of any Miami-Dade public school.

== History ==
After the 2010 Haiti earthquake occurred, the MDCPS expected a large influx of students to Miami Edison. Ultimately, only six earthquake survivors enrolled there, with other students enrolling at other high schools.

== Demographics ==
As of 2008, the school had 1,150 students. 240 of them were taking English as a second language classes, with the majority of them having Haitian Creole as their primary language.

== Academics ==
The state's accountability program grades a school by a complex formula that looks at both current scores and annual improvement on the reading, math, writing, and science FCATs.

The school's grades by year since the FCAT began in 1998 are:

- 1998-99: F
- 1999-00: D
- 2000-01: D
- 2001-02: F
- 2002-03: F
- 2003-04: F
- 2004-05: F
- 2005-06: F
- 2006-07: D
- 2007-08: F
- 2008-09: F
- 2009-10: C
- 2010-11: C
- 2011-12: B
- 2012-13: B
- 2013-14: C
- 2014-15: C
- 2015-16: C
- 2016-17: C
- 2017-18: C
- 2018-19: B

== News ==
In 2001, Leadership Miami and the Inner City Youth Center Miami Youth Center enlisted noted area abstract artist Antonia Gerstacker to organize area youth to help paint an inspirational mural facing the school's sports grounds.

In response to an arrest made on 29 February 2008, a riot broke out the following day (Friday). Miami-Dade Police, Miami-Dade County School Police, and Florida Highway Patrol officials reported to the scene.

== Notable alumni ==
- Pete Athas - former NFL player
- Warren Bryant - former NFL player
- William Laws Calley Jr - former U.S. Army officer, convicted for My Lai Massacre
- Randy Christmas - mayor of Miami (1955–1957)
- Michael Clayton II, class of 2026 – college football quarterback for the Illinois Fighting Illini
- Midre Cummings, class of 1990 - Major League Baseball player with numerous teams, primarily Pittsburgh Pirates and Minnesota Twins
- Al Darby - former NFL player
- Marie Ferdinand-Harris - WNBA player
- Keith Ferguson - former NFL player for the San Diego Chargers and Detroit Lions
- Sylvia Fowles, class of 2004 - WNBA basketball player (2015 WNBA Finals MVP) and Olympic gold medalist at the 2008 Beijing Olympics (transferred to Gulliver Preparatory)
- Patricia Harty - actress (Occasional Wife), (Blondie)
- Jasper Howard - football player for the University of Connecticut Huskies
- William Joseph - former NFL first-round pick and current defensive tackle for the Oakland Raiders
- Markenzy Lapointe - U.S. Attorney, Southern District of Florida
- Larry Libertore - college football player, businessman, and Florida state legislator
- Thomas Mattingly - astronaut, orbited the Moon on Apollo 16, flew STS-4, and STS 51-C
- John Mica - Congressman
- Tangi Miller - actress on Felicity, Tyler Perry's Family Reunion
- Nat Moore - former NFL wide receiver for the Miami Dolphins
- Mary Rountree - baseball player
- Oteman Sampson - football player
- Clay Shaw - Florida Congressman
- Jackie Simpson - former NFL player for the Baltimore Colts and Pittsburgh Steelers
- Bunny Yeager - photographer, author, pin-up model and actress

== See also ==
- Miami Edison Middle School
- Education in the United States
