= Al Darby =

American football player (born 1954)

No. 87, 89, 82
- Position: Tight end

Personal information
- Born: September 14, 1954 (age 72); Miami, Florida, U.S.
- Listed height: 6 ft 5 in (1.96 m)
- Listed weight: 221 lb (100 kg)

Career information
- High school: Edison (Miami)
- College: Florida
- NFL draft: 1976: 6th round, 157th overall pick

Career history
- Seattle Seahawks (1976); Houston Oilers (1976); Tampa Bay Buccaneers (1978)
- Stats at Pro Football Reference

Alvis Russell Darby (born September 14, 1954) is an American former professional football player who was a tight end for two seasons in the National Football League (NFL). Darby played college football for the Florida Gators, and was chosen by the Seattle Seahawks in the sixth round of the 1976 NFL draft. He also played in the NFL for the Houston Oilers and Tampa Bay Buccaneers.

== Early life ==
Darby was born in Miami, Florida. He attended Miami Edison High School, and played high school football for the Miami Edison Red Raiders. In the 1970 Florida Class AA state championship game, he had a 62-yard touchdown reception, contributing to the Edison Red Raiders' 42–22 victory over Fort Pierce Central.

== College career ==
Darby accepted an athletic scholarship to attend the University of Florida in Gainesville, Florida, where he played for coach Doug Dickey's Gators teams from 1973 to 1975. He played in 35 games for the Gators, starting as a tight end as a sophomore and senior, but filling the wide receiver's slot as a junior. On a Gators team that emphasized Doug Dickey's running game and option over the passing the game, Darby compiled 314 yards and four touchdowns on 22 receptions, with an average of 14.3 yards per catch. During his three seasons as a Gator, the team appeared in three consecutive post-season bowl games for the first time in its history. Memorably, he had a 32-yard reception in the 1974 Sugar Bowl.

== Professional career ==
The NFL expansion Seattle Seahawks franchise chose Darby in the sixth round, with the 157th overall pick, of the 1976 NFL draft. During his 1976 rookie season, he appeared in one game for the Seahawks and two more for the Houston Oilers. He did not play during the 1977 NFL season, but appeared in six games for the Tampa Bay Buccaneers in 1978.

== See also ==
- Florida Gators football, 1970–79
- List of Florida Gators in the NFL draft
- List of Seattle Seahawks players
- List of Tampa Bay Buccaneers players
- List of University of Florida alumni
