= Pete Athas =

American football player (1946–2015)

No. 45, 24
- Position: Cornerback / Safety

Personal information
- Born: September 15, 1946; Hackensack, New Jersey, U.S.
- Died: June 28, 2015 (aged 68); Miami, Florida, U.S.
- Listed height: 5 ft 11 in (1.80 m)
- Listed weight: 185 lb (84 kg)

Career information
- High school: Miami Edison (FL)
- College: Tennessee
- NFL draft: 1970: 10th round, 257 (By the Dallas Cowboys)th overall pick

Career history
- Orlando Panthers (1968–1969); Dallas Cowboys (1970)*; Norfolk Neptunes (1970); New York Giants (1971–1974); Cleveland Browns (1975); Minnesota Vikings (1975); New Orleans Saints (1976)
- * Offseason or practice squad member only

Career NFL statistics
- Games played: 79
- Games started: 52
- Interceptions: 16
- Stats at Pro Football Reference

Peter Garrett Athas (September 15, 1946 – June 28, 2015) was an American professional football cornerback who played six seasons in the National Football League (NFL) for the New York Giants, Cleveland Browns, Minnesota Vikings and the New Orleans Saints. He played college football at the University of Tennessee.

== Early life ==
Athas attended Miami Edison High School, before he walked on to the University of Tennessee.

He would never letter in football with the Volunteers, after playing in just 2 games for the freshman team (freshmen were not eligible until 1972) and dropping out of college. He also attended Miami-Dade Junior College.

== Professional career ==
=== Orlando Panthers (COFL) ===
In 1968, Athas was signed by the Orlando Panthers of the Continental Football League. He was named the starter at cornerback, receiving All-Star honors after leading the league with a record 10 interceptions.

In 1969, he led the league again in interceptions with 9 (one returned for a touchdown). Counting also pre-season and post-season games, he posted a total of 27 interceptions in 34 games.

=== Dallas Cowboys ===
Entering the 1970 NFL draft, the Dallas Cowboys were looking to improve the talent level of their defensive backfield, so they proceeded to trade for All-Pro cornerback Herb Adderley and selected 5 defensive backs, with Athas being selected in the tenth round (257th) overall.

As a rookie, he was being tried out at free safety and was moving up the depth chart, until getting into a fight with teammate Reggie Rucker, which caused him a broken jaw and lost time because of the injury. He was waived before the start of the season.

=== Norfolk Neptunes (ACFL) ===
Athas signed with the Norfolk Neptunes of the Atlantic Coast Football League for their 1970 season.

=== New York Giants ===
Athas was signed as a free agent by the New York Giants in 1971, reuniting with defensive coordinator Jim Garrett, who was his head coach with the Orlando Panthers. He earned a starting role as a cornerback and a punt returner. He tied for the team lead in interceptions (4) in 1972 and led the team with 5 interceptions the next year. He was released on September 10, 1975.

=== Cleveland Browns ===
On September 18, 1975, he signed as a free agent with the Cleveland Browns. he was named the starter at free safety, until committing critical errors (two fumbled punts and an unsportsmanlike penalty) in a 23–7 loss against the Washington Redskins, which led to his surprising release on October 28.

=== Minnesota Vikings ===
Athas signed with the Minnesota Vikings after his release and was used as a reserve cornerback. He was cut before the start of the 1976 season.

=== New Orleans Saints ===
On September 15, 1976, the New Orleans Saints signed him as a free agent, to use him as a punt returner and reserve cornerback, after Clarence Chapman was injured. He finished with the second most punt returns (35) in team history at the time. He was waived on April 5, 1977.

== Personal life ==
Athas resided in Miami, Florida, until his death from lymphoma on June 28, 2015.
