= Lemon City Branch Library =

Library in Miami, Florida, U.S.

Coordinates: 25°49′56.1″N 80°11′13.7″W

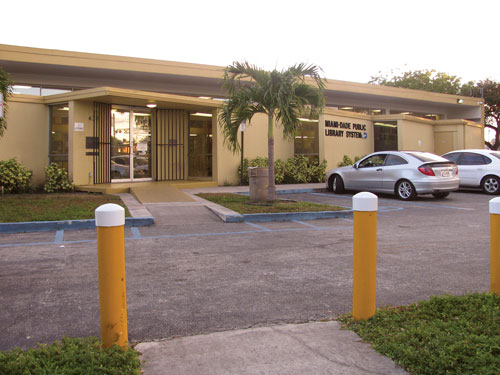
- Location: 430 NE 61st Street; Miami, FL 33137, United States
- Established: 1894
- Branch of: Miami-Dade Public Library System

Collection
- Size: 10,000

Other information
- Website: mdpls.org/branch-lemon-city

The Lemon City Library is the oldest library within the Miami-Dade Public Library System. The library opened to the public on April 7, 1894, and featured a reading room.

== History ==
=== Early years ===
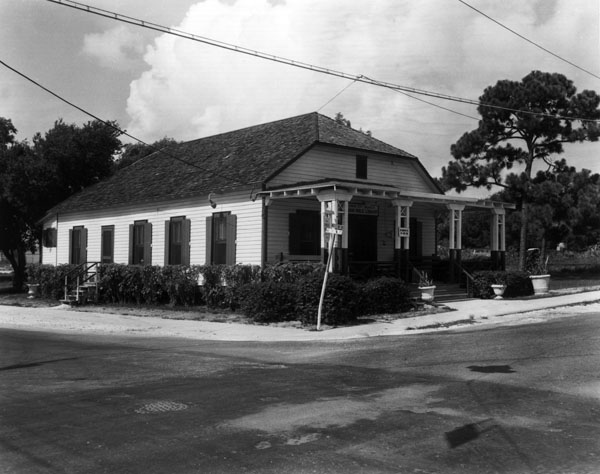
Former location at 412 NE 61st Street

The creation of the Lemon City Library is credited to the Lemon City Library and Improvement Association which decided to establish a reading room inside the front of Cornelia Keyes' cottage, located at 701 NE 62nd Street. Keyes, who was originally from Chicago, owned the prestigious Lemon City Hotel and also taught school. On April 7, 1894, Keyes opened the doors of her modest library to the small community of 350 residents.

In 1902 the Lemon City Library moved into its first, dedicated building made of wood planks, which was located at 412 NE 61st Street. This location served the patrons of the surrounding area for 62 years.

In the early days, the Lemon City Library's first collection consisted of contributions from many illustrious donators. Andrew Carnegie, who docked his yacht near Lemon City, was said to have donated a small assortment of volumes. Charles B. Cory, the curator of the Field Columbian Museum in Chicago, was also said to have gifted a few dozen volumes while he was in the area for one of his annual Everglades safaris. Henry Flagler, the founder of the Florida East Coast Railway, was also said to have donated generously to the cause.

Similarly to many libraries of the time, a majority of the work done to develop and sustain a community library was done so by a group of local women whose goal it was to create betterment in the community. Thirteen women came together on the day the library first opened its doors, and pledged to pay ten cents in monthly dues, donate a book to the collection, and take a book home in order to stimulate the use of the library. Unlike other local communities who had the support of a woman's club which supported many local endeavors, in Lemon City, these thirteen women joined together to create the Lemon City Library Association on February 4, 1902. This association of volunteers were constantly fundraising through community socials to raise money needed to add titles and later build its first dedicated building. In the first three years, they were able to raise $683.46, the equivalent to over $18,000 today. All of this money went towards building the library, which opened its doors in 1905 with 346 titles.

Among the more popular books being circulated during these early years were Wonders of the World, Ben-Hur, Decline and Fall of the Roman Empire, Ramona, Barriers Burned Away, The Five Little Peppers, and The Farmer's Almanac.

=== Joining the Miami-Dade Public Library ===
External videos
- Exterior view of Miami Public Library: Lemon City Branch

External videos
- Interior view of Miami Public Library: Lemon City Branch

For nearly forty years, the Lemon City Library was staffed by volunteers who were overseen by the Lemon City Library and Improvement Association. The library itself managed to outlive the community it was a part of when Lemon City was enveloped by surrounding neighborhoods. Today the area is known as Little Haiti. In 1942 the library became a member of the Miami Public Library. After a fire broke out, the branch was expected to close in 1963 as the damage from the fire was too impracticable to restore. Members of the community had been advocating for the construction of a new building to house the library, and for the original to be marked as a historical landmark. The Lemon City Branch Library officially opened the doors to its current location, a 6,393 square foot building located at 430 NE 61st Street, on April 13, 1964.

Today, the library boasts a 10,000 piece collection of books and materials, including databases and internet access.

=== Important events/dates in the establishment of the Lemon City Public Library ===
The exact date of the Lemon City Public Library has come into question over the last few years, due to confusion over the meaning and distinction between the words library, circulating library, and public library. According to historical records, Miss Ada Merritt arrived in Lemon City in the 1890s to serve as a school teacher and establish the first "school library" in Lemon City. As Lemon City's population continued to rise, citizens living in Lemon City began to form their own cultural engagement groups in order to bring more life to the city, and to improve life in the city as a whole. One such group was created by Ada Merritt, coined the "Busy Bees of the Everglades" this group of young women came together to raise money for the fledgling school library collection. Through the group's efforts, the collection grew over a period of several years to reach the sizable amount of 400 volumes. Between 1892 and 1893, Ada Merritt and the Busy Bees coordinated various functions, from dances to formal dinners, in an effort to raise money and continue funding and supporting the growing library. The Tropical Sun newspaper, the first newspaper published in the area, features an article dated May 6, 1893 that describes Miss Ada Merritt's school library and the delivery of new books for the collection. There is no mention of another library established in Lemon City during the early years of Ada Merritt's school library.

In 1896, the Village Improvement Association (V.I.A.) came together in the home of Mrs. Cornelia Keys with the aim to improve roads going in and out of Lemon City. Before the roads were laid, residents and travelers journeying through Lemon City and beyond were forced to traverse rocky roads, mud, and swamps. Paved roads required hard labor and funds; through the V.I.A.'s efforts, fully functional, easily traversable roads started to become a reality. In 1902, Dade County took on the task of overseeing road construction in and out of Lemon City, and funded such projects through the selling of bonds, leaving the V.I.A in need of a new mission.

In 1902, thirteen women came together once more in the home of Cornelia Keys; the V.I.A. was disbanded and a new group formed a library association. These thirteen women, many of whom were former members of the V.I.A., went on to become the motivating force behind the creation of the first recorded public library in Lemon City. Following the example set by the Busy Bees over a decade before the library association's formation, the group started to host fundraising events to support the library initiative. It was at this time that Cornelia Keys' residence began to serve as the base for the town's library. For the next three years, until 1905, the thirteen members of the library association agreed to pay monthly member dues, donate books, and take books home, much like a traditional circulating library at the time.

During this time, the library association's valiant effort served to grow the number of monetary contributions received through fundraising events, as well as the available number of furnishings and books for the collection itself. Construction of the library began in 1904 and found a home at 412 N.E. 61st Street in Lemon City. The formal dedication ceremony for Lemon's City Public Library took place on January 13, 1905. The library served Lemon City residents for several decades, and became part of the Miami-Dade Public Library System in 1942. In 1963, the library was scheduled to close and after a fire caused severe damage to the structure; it was decided that a new Lemon City Public Library would be built. On April 13, 1964, the newly built Lemon City Public Library officially opened and has remained open at its current location ever since. A plaque placed beside the library marks the site as a Florida Heritage site and commemorates the history of the library, serving as a reminder of its original location, and the efforts of those enterprising individuals who strove to make the library a reality for the residents of Lemon City.
