= Dana A. Dorsey =

African-American businessman, banker, and philanthropist

- Born: 1872; Quitman, Georgia, U.S.
- Died: February 29, 1940 (aged 67–68)
- Resting place: Lincoln Memorial Park
- Occupations: Businessman, banker

Dana Albert "D. A." Dorsey (1872 – February 29, 1940) was a businessman, banker, and philanthropist who became one of the first African–American millionaires in Florida and the American South.

== Childhood and education ==
Dana Albert Dorsey was born in Quitman, Georgia. He was the son of former slaves and the first child in his family who was not born into slavery. Dorsey had formally received only a fourth-grade level of education. Afterwards he continued teaching himself.

== Carpenter, businessman, philanthropist ==
Dorsey came to the Miami area of South Florida around 1896. He worked as a carpenter for the Henry Flagler Florida East Coast Railroad. During that time, he recognized the need to provide housing for black workers. He purchased one parcel of land in Overtown at a time, on which he designed and constructed one rental house per parcel, reinvesting the rental income to build more and rent more, eventually expanding as far north as Fort Lauderdale.

In 1917, he and his wife Rebecca sold land to the City of Miami for a park for African–Americans (during an era of segregation). Dorsey Park is located on Northwest 17th Street and First Avenue.

In 1919, Dorsey was forced to sell Fisher Island to the automotive pioneer Carl G. Fisher, who was developing Miami Beach. In 1926, Fisher traded 7 acres of the island to William Kissam Vanderbilt II in return for a 200-foot (61 m) yacht. Vanderbilt's improvements led to what is today one of the wealthiest and most exclusive residential enclaves in the area.

Dorsey was a trustee at Mount Zion Baptist Church in Overtown.

The first black-owned hotel in Miami was his Dorsey Hotel, and he was the owner of the Negro Savings Bank. Dorsey was a firm believer in education and he donated a large quantity of land for black schools.

== Legacy ==
When Dorsey died in 1940, he was buried in Lincoln Memorial Park, Miami's African American cemetery during segregation.

He donated to Dade County Public Schools, the property at NW 71st Street and 17th Avenue on which Dorsey High School (today known as the D. A. Dorsey Educational Center) was later built. The D.A. Dorsey Educational Center has a tradition in the Liberty City area of Miami as a fully operational adult education center.

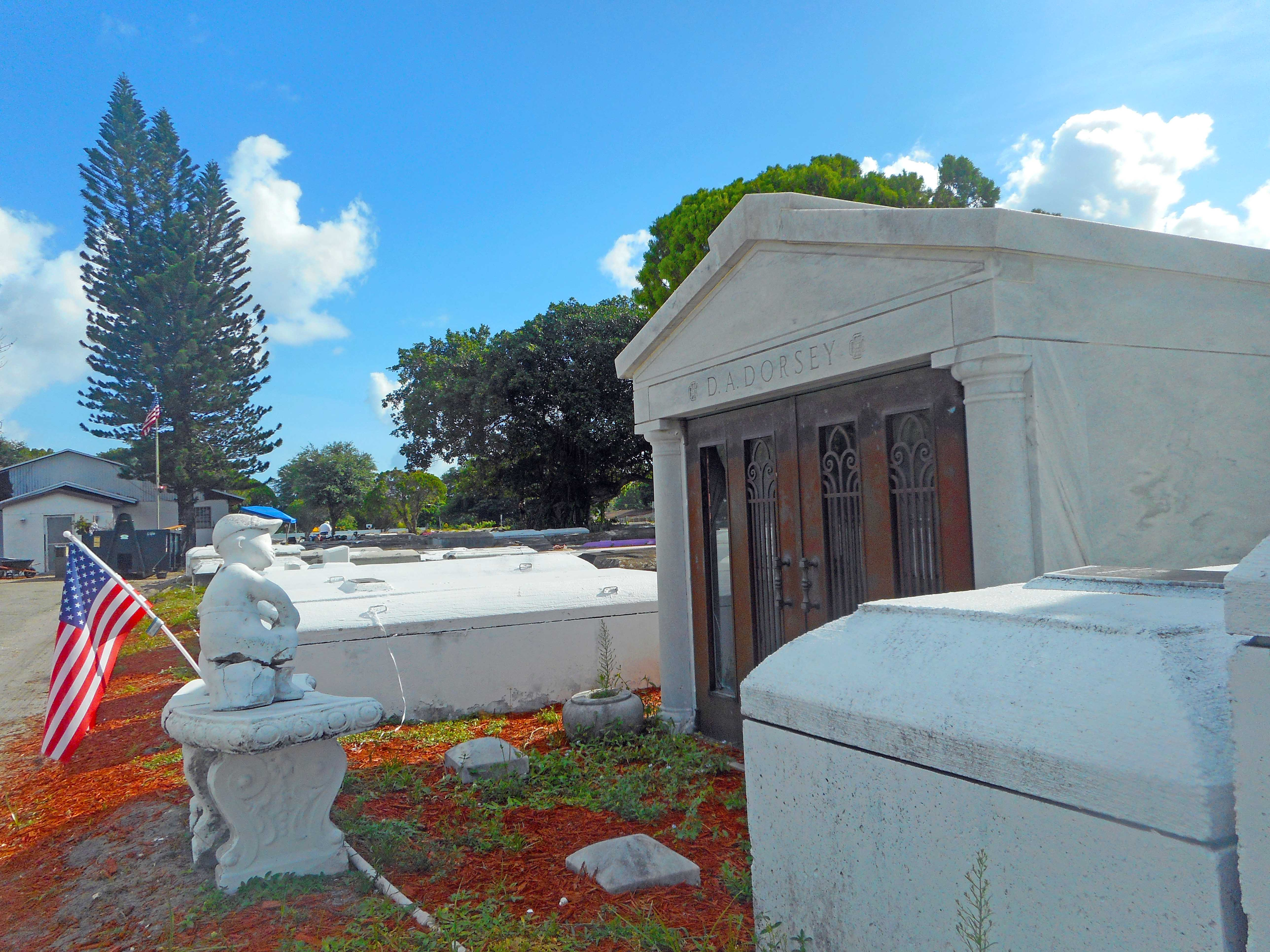
Lincoln Memorial Park – Mausoleum of Dana A Dorsey

=== The Dorsey Memorial Library ===
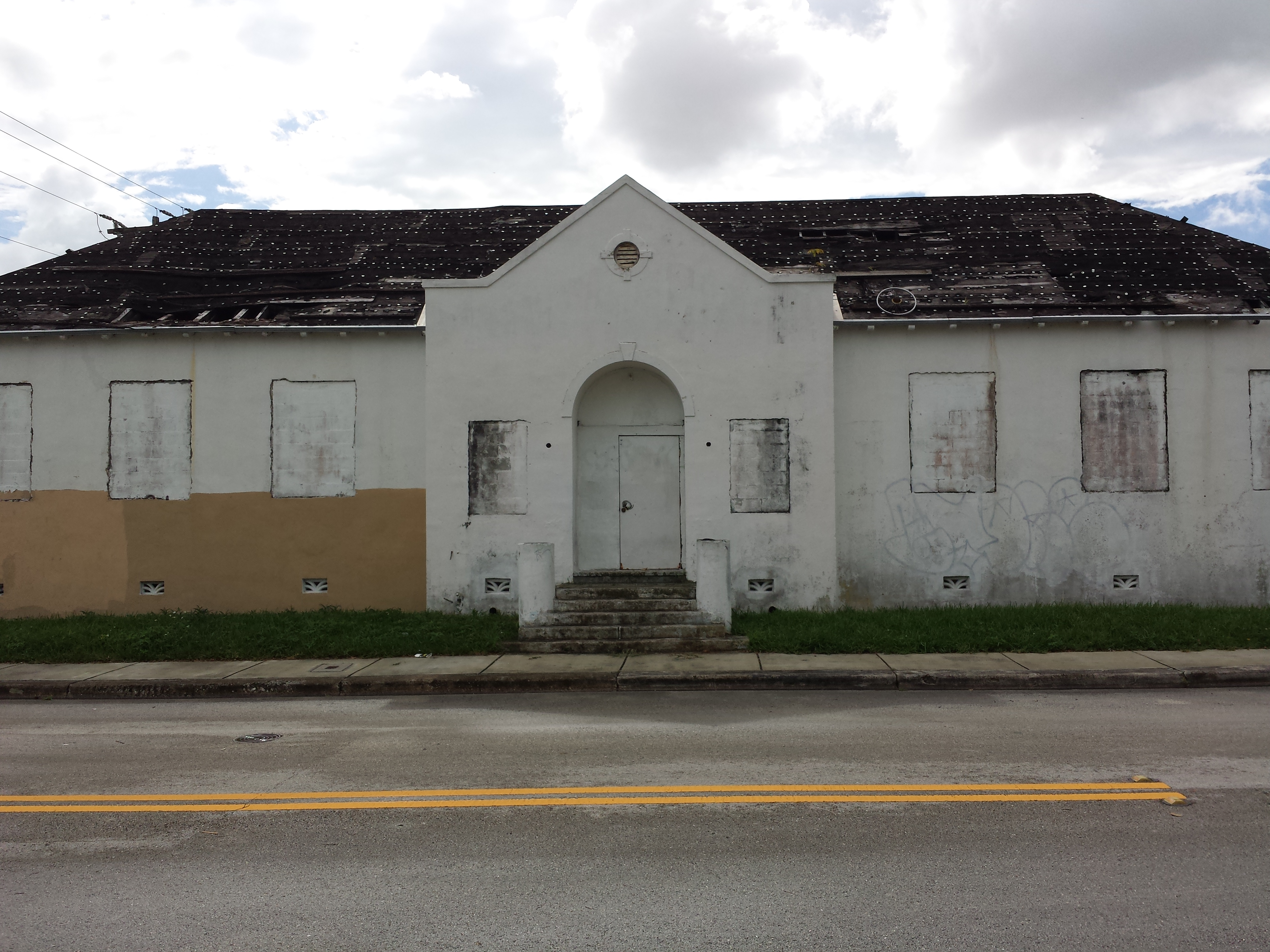
The Dorsey Memorial Library as of November 2013, prior to restoration

Dana Albert Dorsey is often described as Miami's first Black millionaire. Through his constant reinvesting of his rental income into building more rental property, he was able to be the key player in providing for a new library that would be named after him. With that rental income, Dorsey was able to invest in the land, and at one time owned 21 acres of what is now Fisher Island near Miami Beach. Just fifteen days before his death, Dorsey donated the land on which the library was to be constructed.

In addition to the land donation, the ladies of the Washington Heights Neighborhood Association and the Friendship Garden Club worked to raise funds needed to begin construction. Dorsey's donation came with an eighteen-month timeline, so the City of Miami also donated $7,000 to meet said deadline. The Dorsey Memorial Library, which opened in 1941, was the second to serve the African–American public and is located in Overtown. It was the first city-owned building constructed specifically for library purposes, and was used for the next two decades. The building is a simple, one-story rectangular block with two wings. One wing was designated for adults and the other for children. The library began its initial inventory with some 2,000 volumes. In 1961, the Dorsey Library was relocated to newer and larger quarters and was renamed the Dixie Park Branch Library. In keeping with the policy of naming branch libraries after their geographic location, in 1983 the County Commission changed the name at that time to the Culmer/Overtown Branch Library.

The Dorsey Memorial Library is important for its historical roots. It is a testament to the segregation that existed in Miami. The building was crucial in the education of many African–American citizens who lived in the Overtown area (initially called 'Colored Town') during a time when there were few educational options. Since the government's facilities for African–Americans were poorly maintained, if created at all, it was left to the African–American community to see to its own educational, recreational and spiritual needs.

In 2003, the Dorsey Memorial Library was deemed a historical place by the City of Miami. When it was deemed historical, it was noted that the building was in poor condition with the potential to continue to deteriorate without continued maintenance. On March 2, 2016, a public nuisance lawsuit against the City of Miami was filed in Miami-Dade Circuit Court for the City of Miami's failure to maintain the Dorsey Memorial Library. The citations stated that the building was a potential fire or windstorm hazard. On January 17, 2018, city leaders held a groundbreaking ceremony to commemorate the restoration of the building.

== Gallery ==
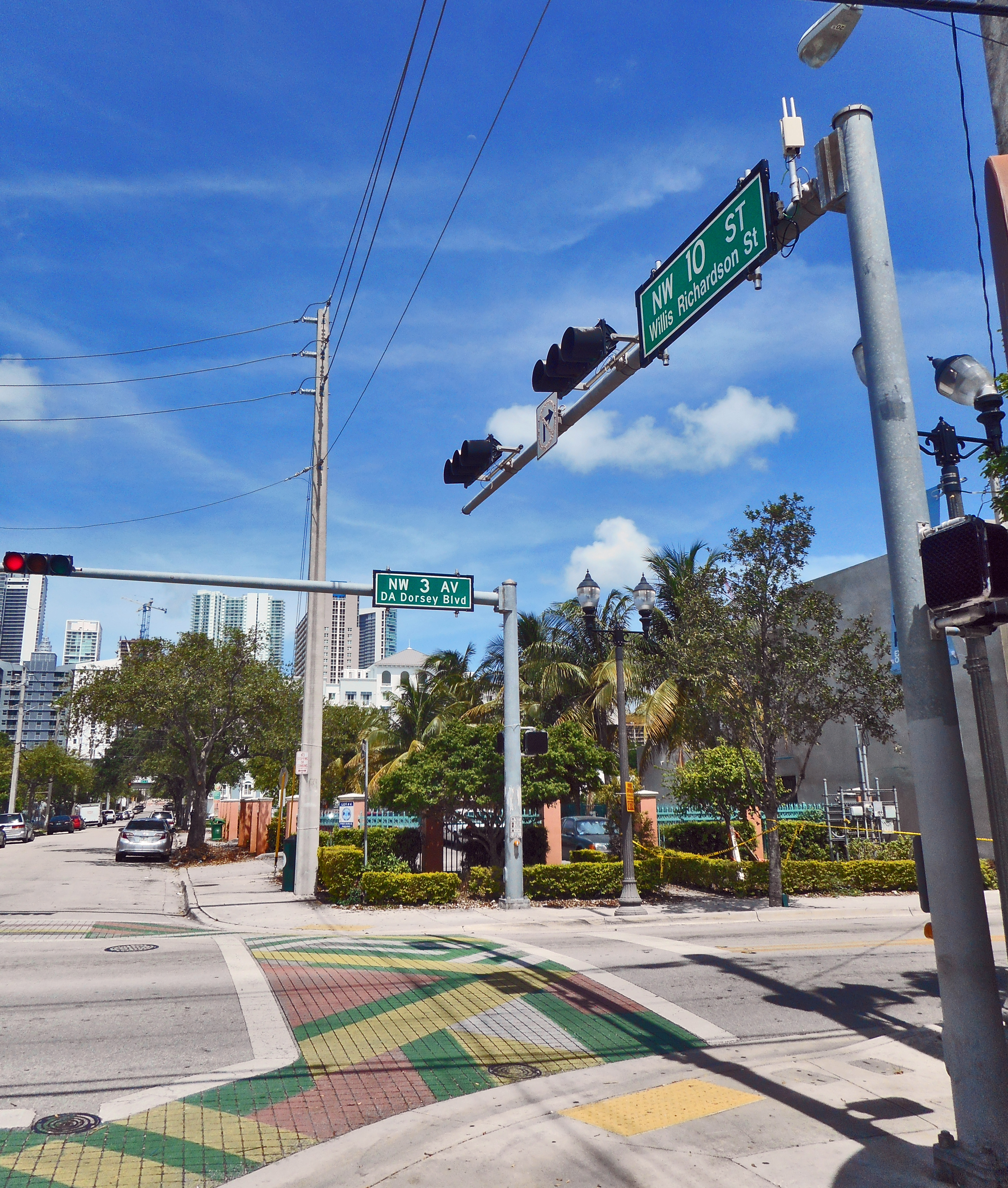
Dana Dorsey Boulevard

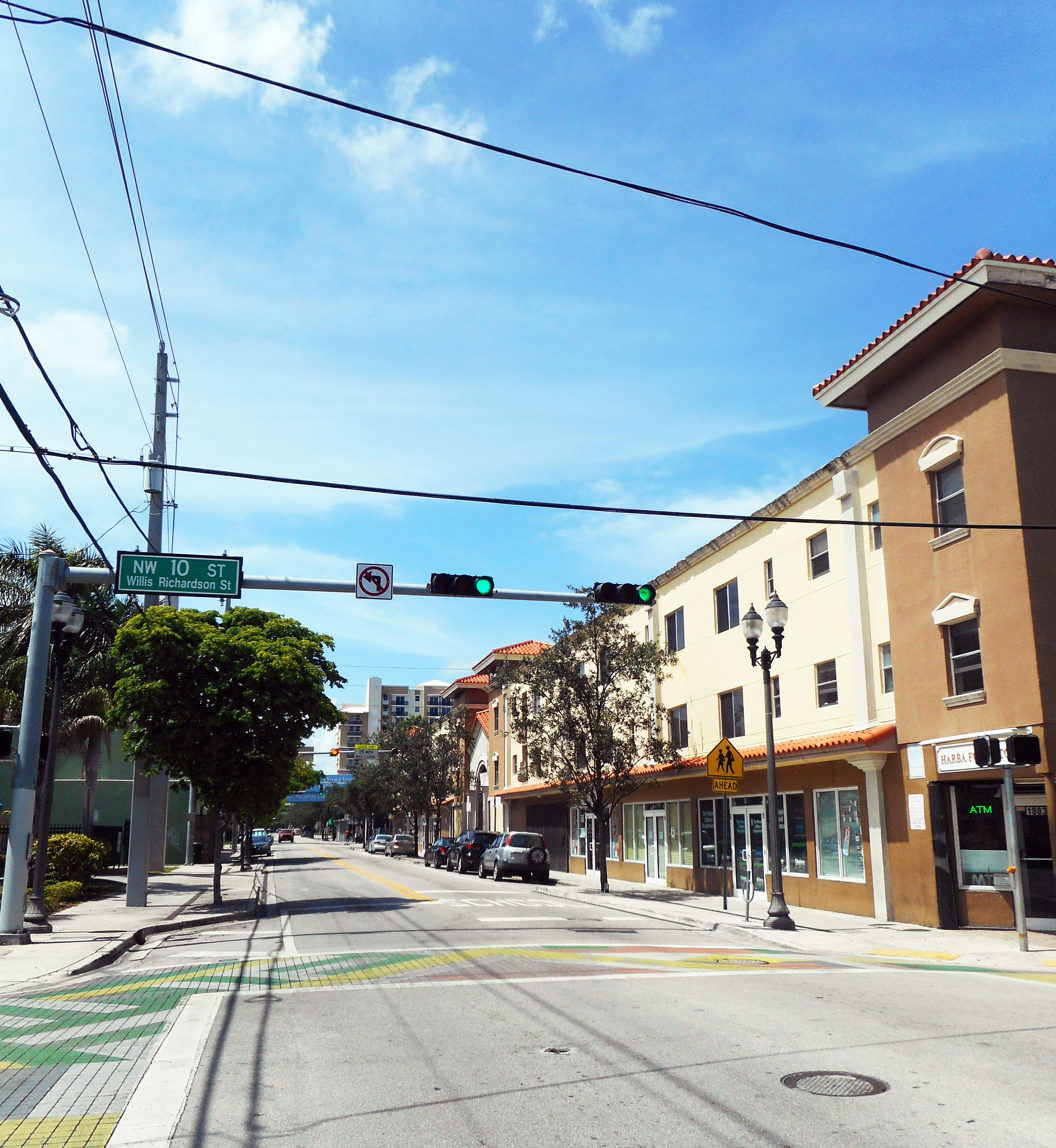
Dana Dorsey Boulevard, looking north, Miami, Overtown

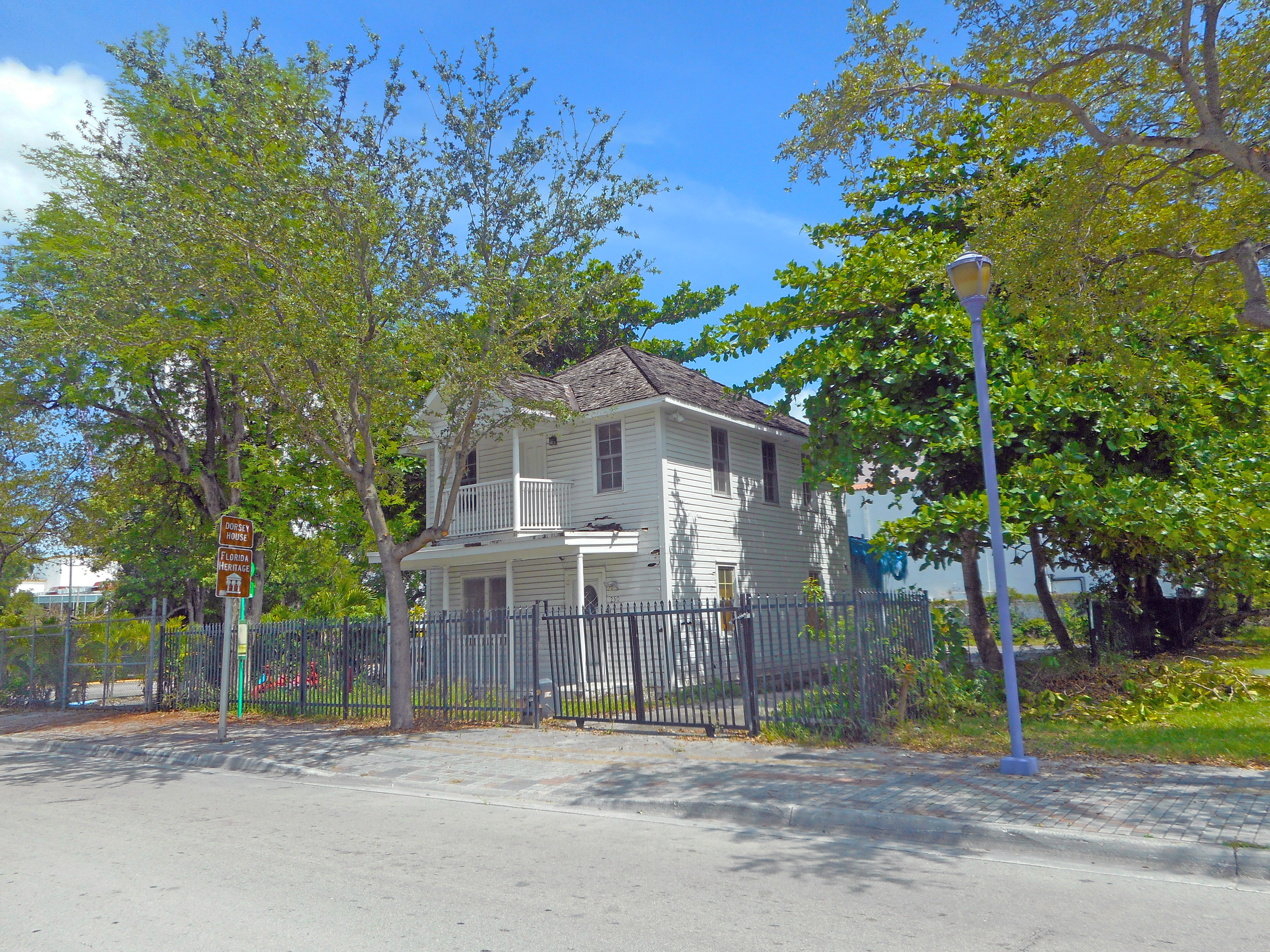
Dana Dorsey House in Overtown Miami

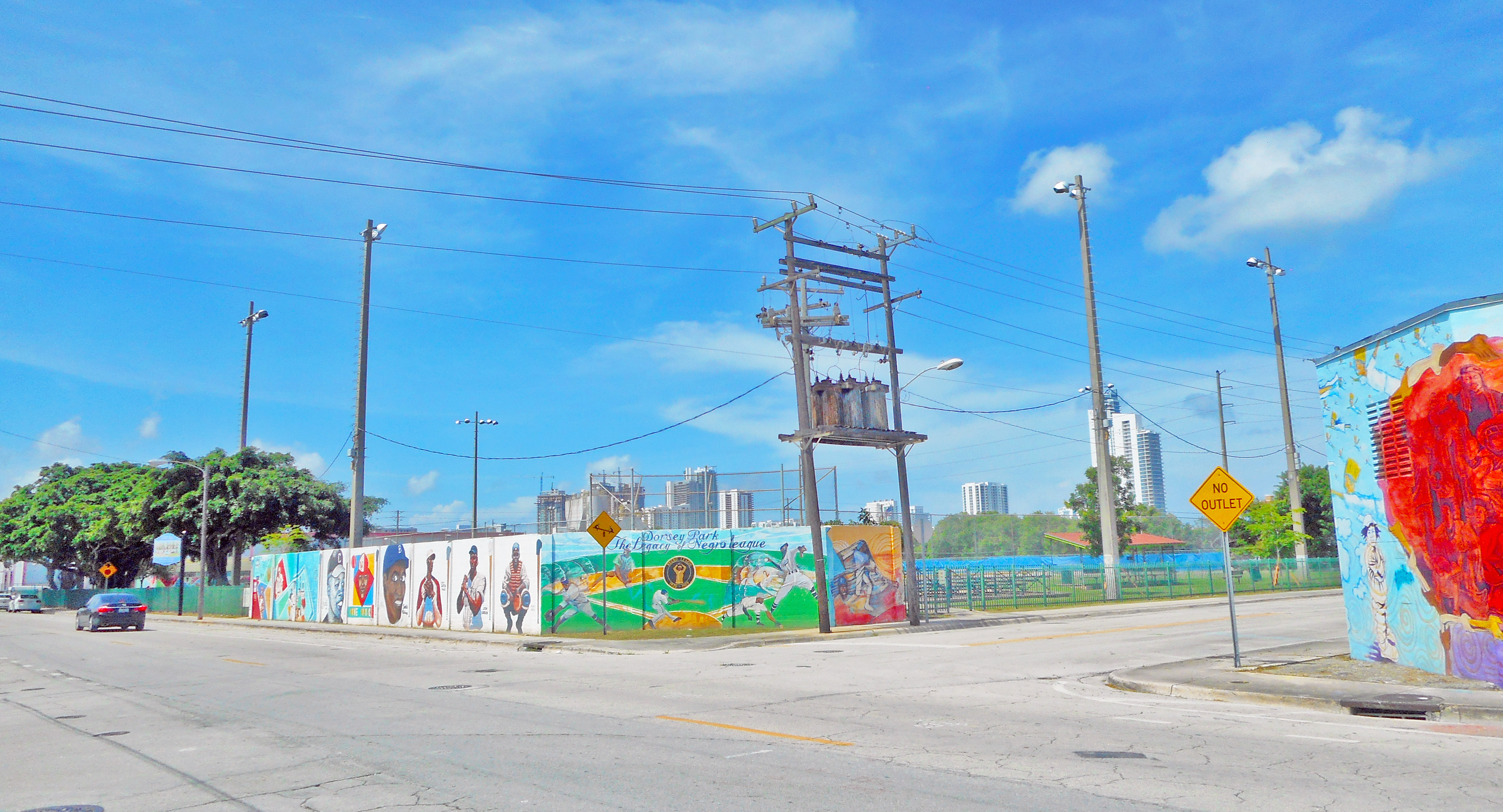
Dana Dorsey Memorial Park - Baseball Field

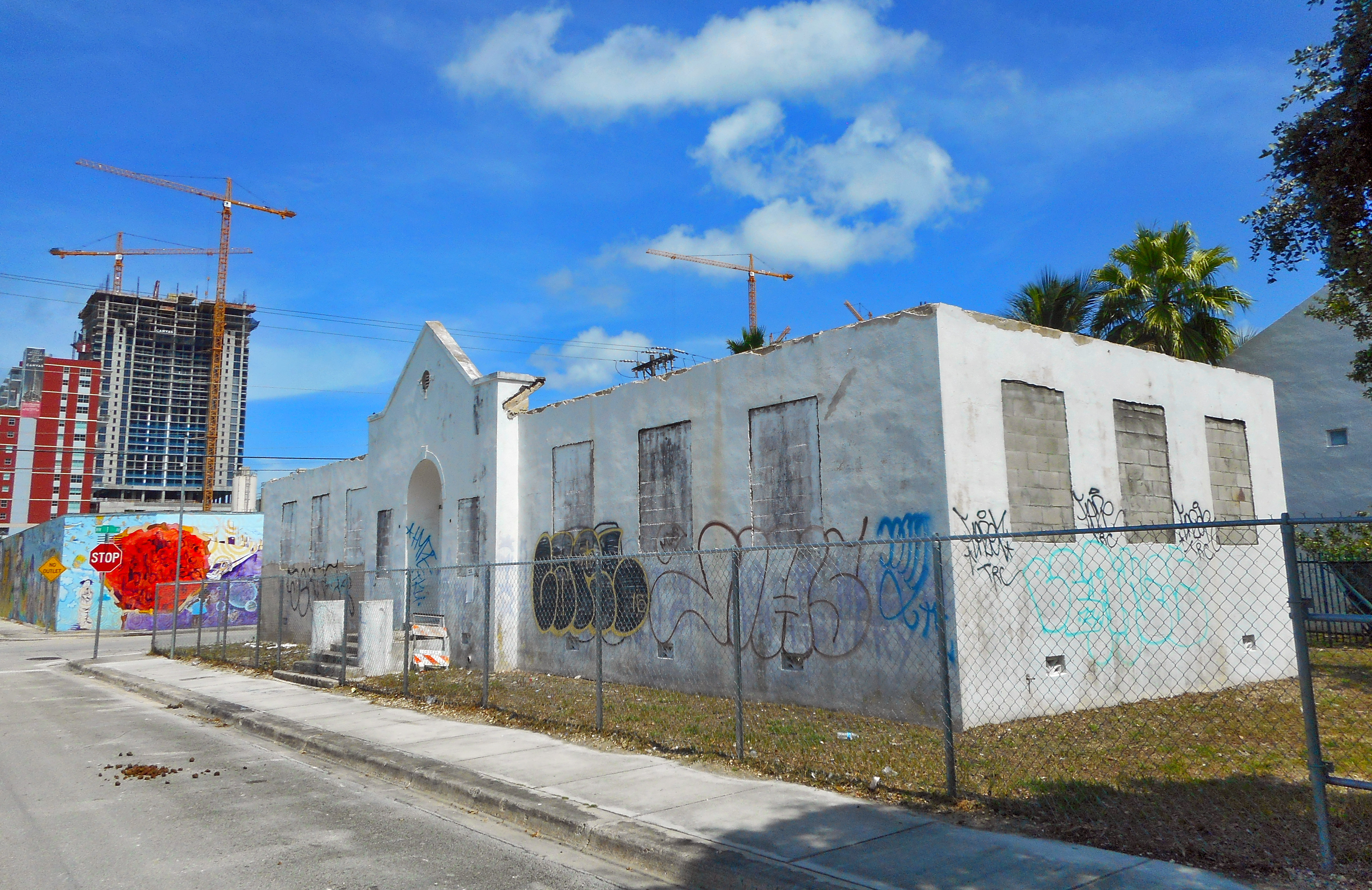
Dana Dorsey Memorial Library in 2017

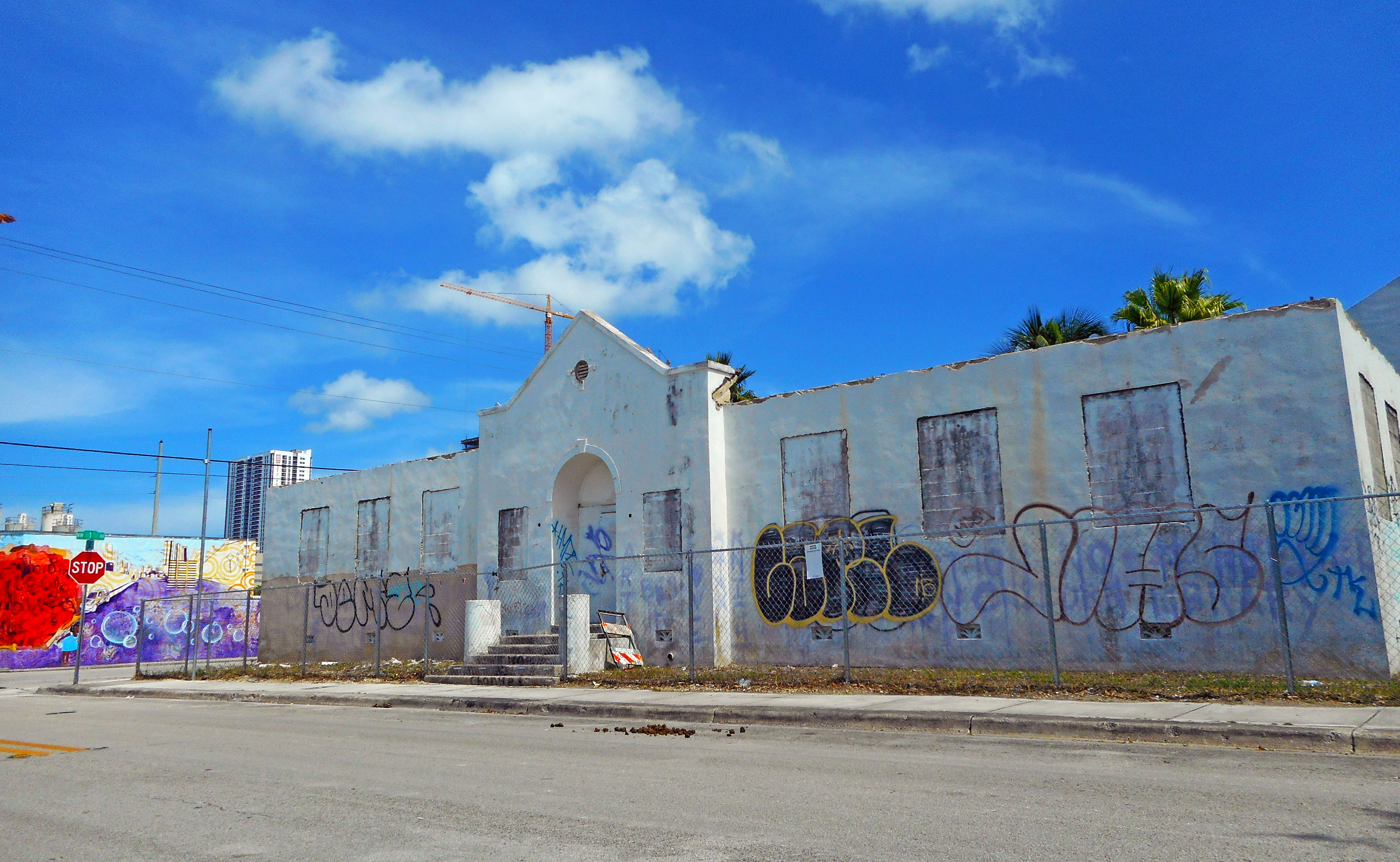
Dana Dorsey Memorial Library in 2017 - Before Restoration

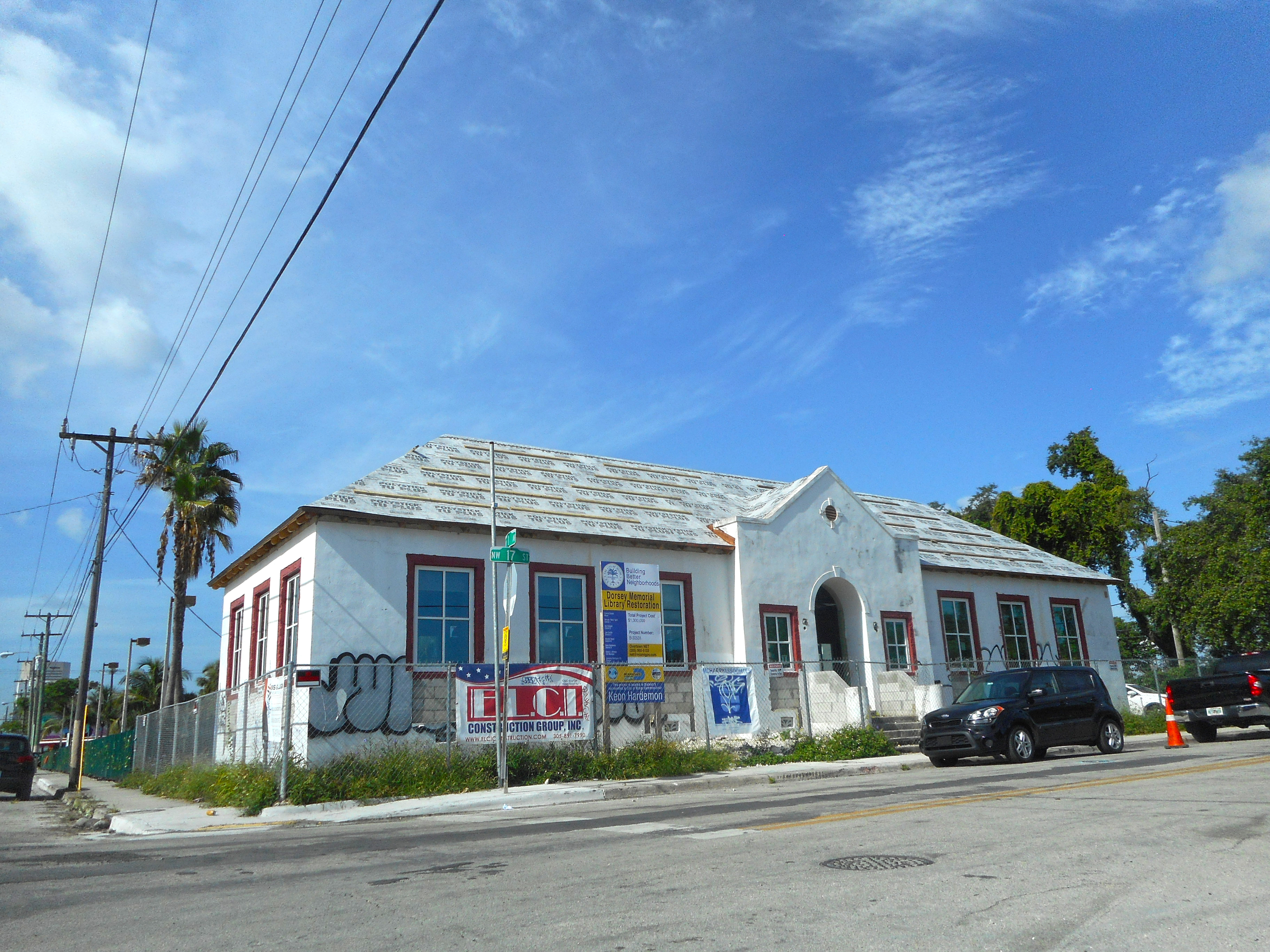
Library with partially completed roof and windows - June 2018
