= Miami Edison Middle School =

- Miami Edison Senior High School
- U.S. National Register of Historic Places
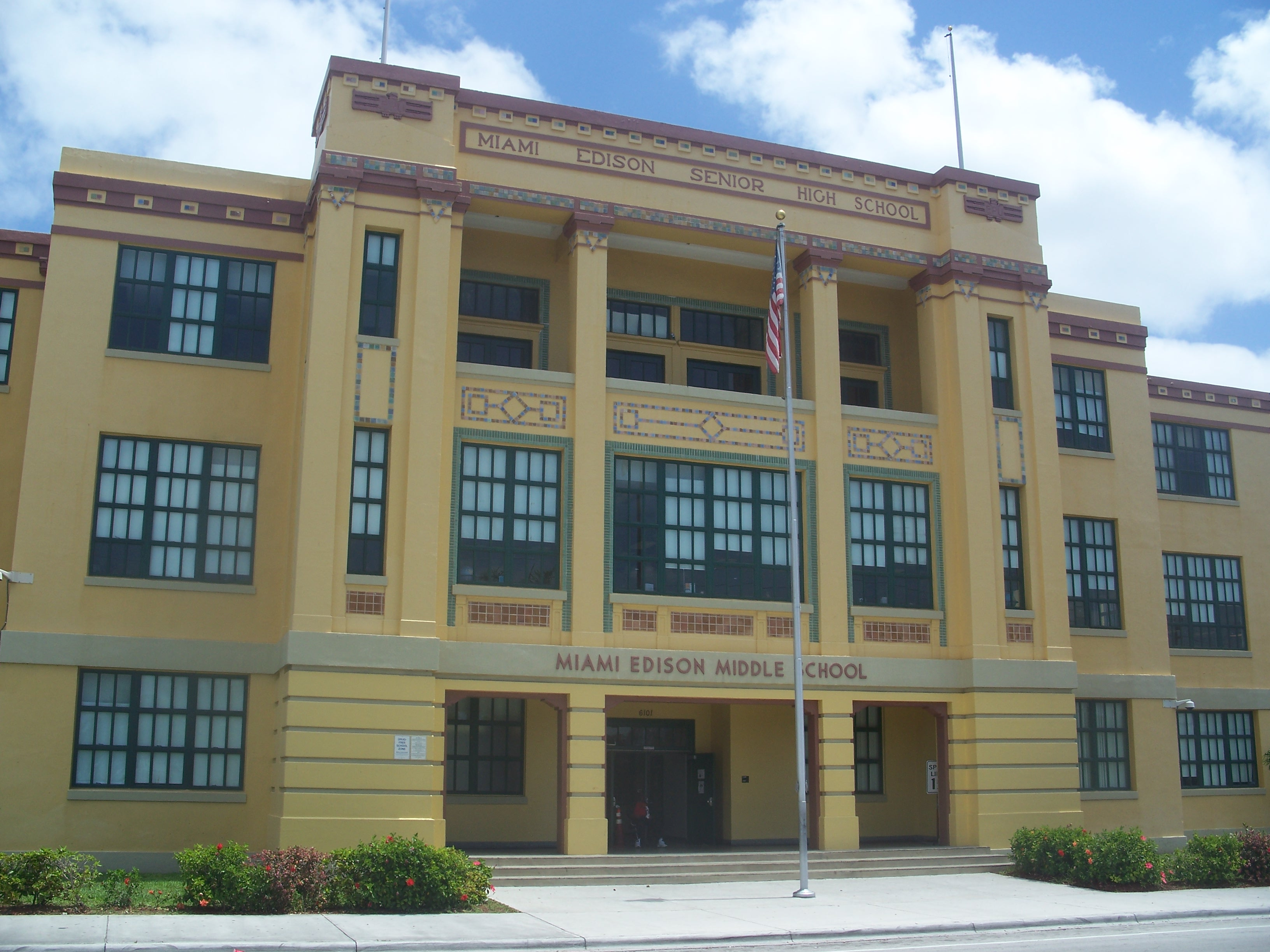

- Location within Miami Location within Florida Location within the United States
- Location: Miami, Florida
- Coordinates: 25°49′54″N 80°11′59″W
- NRHP reference No.: 86001212
- Added to NRHP: June 5, 1986

The Miami Edison Middle School (also known as the Dade County Agricultural High School or Miami Edison Senior High School, and not to be confused with Miami Edison High School) is a historic school in Miami, Florida. It is located at 6101 Northwest 2nd Avenue. On June 5, 1986, it was added to the U.S. National Register of Historic Places. Edison closed in 2015 to make way for New iTech @ Thomas A. Edison Educational Center.
