= Nicknames of Miami =

Bynames of the city of Miami, Florida

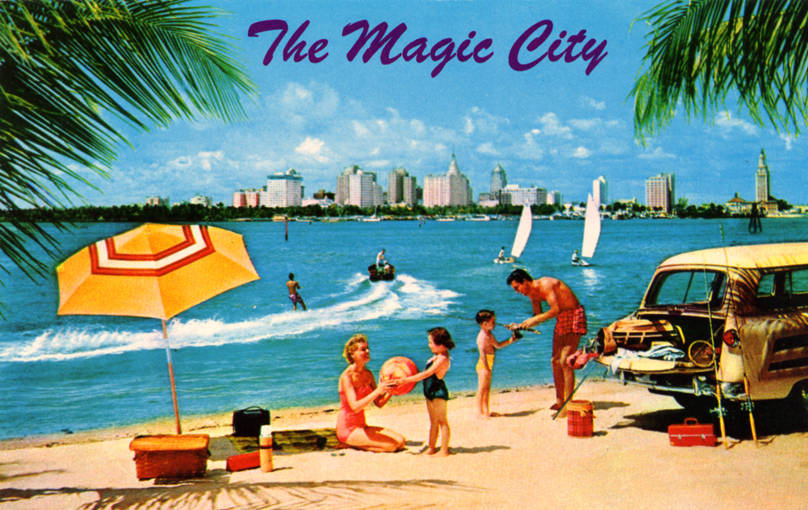
1955 postcard for Miami, titling it the "Magic City".

Throughout the history of Miami, various nicknames have arose to describe the city, or various elements of the city. Certain nicknames are rather historic, in that they are no longer commonly used, while others continue to survive in popular use.

Various nicknames like "America's Playground", "Gateway to the Americas", and the "Magic City", were popularized by investors who hoped to entice people from the American North, and Latin America, to move to Miami, which was advertised as an other-worldy tropical haven.

== City nicknames ==
=== General ===
- 305 - originally the area code of Miami, and parts of Monroe County.
- America's playground - emphasizing the touristic appeal of Miami Beach; developed in the 1920s to emphasize the fun in Miami compared to the despair of the rest of the country during the Great Depression.
- Capital of the Caribbean - nickname developed in the late 20th century, after the influx of Caribbean immigrants to the city, and the growing importance of Miami as a center for Caribbean business elites.
- Capital of the exile (Capital del exilio) - coined after the 1959 Cuban Revolution, as various Cuban exiles relocated to Miami and made the city an epicenter for Cuban life outside of Cuba.
- Capital of Latin America - title devised in the 1980s, as various other Latin immigrant groups, besides Cubans, began to reside in Miami. The nickname is also in reference to Miami's reputation as center for American businesses' offices for Latin America operations. The title's focus on the Latino population also infers Miami's cultural difference from other cities in the New South.
- Cruise ship capital of the world - reference to the fact that the Port of Miami services more cruise ships than any other port in the world (as reported in 1991).
- Gateway to the Americas - title similar to "Capital of Latin America", which also brings attention to various business centers and other organizations in Miami, which focus their activities on the Americas.
- Hollywood of Latin America - emphasizing the Spanish-language media industry located in Miami, which predominantly serves Latin America.
- Kingston 21 - an homage to the 20 districts of Kingston, Jamaica. The nickname infers that Miami is the additional 21st district of Kingston, because of Miami's noteworthy Jamaican population.
- Magic City - arose during the Florida land boom of the 1920s, and references the rapid growth of Miami. As visitors came to Miami for winter vacations, they'd notice the city's rapid growth from year to year, which was "like magic". The term was originally coined in the travel magazine of developer Henry Flagler.
- Sun and fun capital of the world - the description for Miami Beach used by Jackie Gleason. Every episode of The Jackie Gleason Show, when filmed in Miami, was opened with the full tagline: "From the sun and fun capital of the world, Miami Beach, its The Jackie Gleason Show." The nickname stuck, and is still used longer after The Jackie Gleason Show, for the city of Miami in general.
- Vice City - the name for the 80s Miami-themed city in the video game Grand Theft Auto: Vice City. The name has grown to be used as a general nickname for Miami.
- Wall Street South - noted as early as 1998, since Miami had the United States' second largest financial sector after New York City's Wall Street. Was revitalized in 2023, as part of a development plan by Mayor Francis Suarez to improve Miami's financial sector.

=== Controversial ===
- Banana Republic - popularized during the Elian Gonzalez affair, and was used to infer that Miami politics was controlled by right-wing Cuban Americans. Often used by Americans outside of Miami to degrade the politics of the city.
- North Cuba - a faux-geographical phrase which is often used to imply Cuban Americans are refusing to assimilate and are thus removing the American culture of Miami. Used by the Miami Herald to describe Miami, after the election of Cuban-American mayor Francis Suarez.

=== Historic ===
- Dodge City, South - label used in the New York Times, given by Jim Dingfelder, the public affairs officer of the United States Customs Service. The title is in reference to Dodge City, a famously violent wild west town, which was done to highlight Miami's high crime rate at the time (1980s).
- Havana, North - arose after the Cuban post-revolution exodus, as Cuban refugees came to heavily reside in Miami. Argued in the New York Times and Los Angeles Times that the term is outdated, because of the later influx of other Latino immigrants, making the specific predominance of Cubans an outdated image of Miami.
- Leakiest spot in America - once used to describe the frequency of alcohol bootlegging during Prohibition, which was coming in from Rum Row by the Bahamas.

== Neighborhood nicknames ==
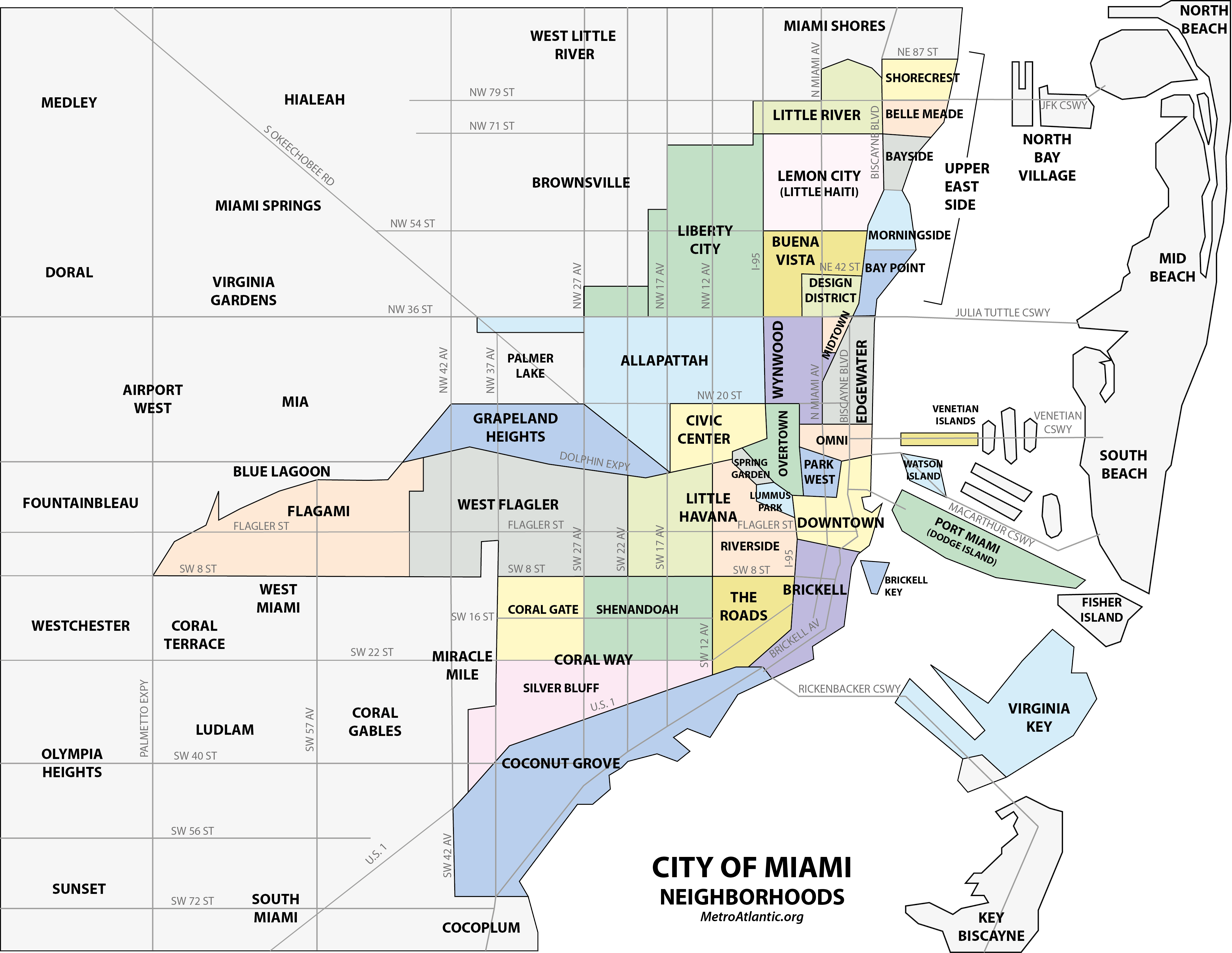
Map of neighborhoods in Miami-Dade county.

=== General ===
- Black grove - a nickname for the Western area of Coconut Grove, which is majority black, compared to the rest of Coconut Grove.
- Doralzuela - a nickname for the Doral neighborhood, that combines the name "Doral" with "Venezuela", in reference to the heavy Venezuelan population of the neighborhood.
- Jewish Riviera - a nickname specifically for Miami Beach, which arose by the 1970s, as the neighborhood was predominantly Jewish.
- La Saguesera - Spanglish term for Southwest Miami. The term comes from the Cuban-Spanish pronunciation of the English-language name "southwest area", and is said in reference to the neighborhood's Cuban population.
- Little Bahamas - a honorific name for Western Coconut Grove, that honors the original Bahamian settlers of Coconut Grove.
- Little Moscow, or Little Russia - are names that highlight the Russian population of Sunny Isles Beach.
- Little Nicaragua - a nickname which emphasizes the Nicaraguan population of the neighborhood of Sweetwater.
- Manhattan of the South - a nickname which highlights the Manhattan-like urban density of the Brickell neighborhood.
- Millionaires' row - emphasizing the wealth of residents who live in Brickell. Originally coined in the 1910s for the mansions on Brickell Avenue, the mansions are now mostly gone, but the neighborhood is still quite wealthy.
- Sixth borough - coined in the early 1950s to emphasize that Miami Beach was practically a part of New York City's five boroughs. It was devised as many New Yorkers (mostly Jews) frequently traveled to Miami for vacation. Eventually the presence of New Yorkers became permanent in Miami Beach, as many set up businesses, or bought homes.

=== Controversial ===
- Murder Gardens - a renaming of Miami Gardens, which accentuates the murder rate of the neighborhood during the mid-2000s. Critics claim the name is considered an unfair portrayal of a majority black neighborhood, especially considering recent drops in crime by 2021.

=== Historic ===
- Baghdad of Dade county - the nickname given to the Opa-locka neighborhood, by its founder Glenn Curtiss, who hoped to build a lavish neighborhood architecturally inspired by Arabia. The neighborhood is currently rather economically depressed compared to the rest of the city. The area currently still maintains a variety of Moorish-style buildings, including its city hall.
- God's waiting room - once in reference to the elderly and retired population of Miami Beach before the mid-20th century. The image of Miami Beach as a famous retiree community was ended by the influx of Cuban refugees during the 1980 Mariel boatlift.
- Little Jerusalem - a nickname for Miami Beach, in reference to its predominant Jewish community. Considered outdated by the New York Times, since many Jewish institutions have been converted to condos by the 21st century.
- Little San Juan - the former nickname for the Wynwood neighborhood when it was a predominantly working-class Puerto Rican neighborhood, while it is now an affluent art district.
- Pork and beans - the local nickname for the housing projects of Liberty Square in the Liberty City neighborhood. The projects originally had doors with a reddish-orange color, resembling pork and beans. The projects were demolished and replaced in 2025.
- Shtetl by the sea - a name for the Jewish community of Miami Beach. Now considered outdated by the New York Times as by the 21st century, many Jewish institutions had been converted to condos.

== Referential nicknames ==
- Miami of Europe - a nickname for Málaga, Spain, which compares the cities for their beaches and sunshine.
- Miami of the Middle East - a nickname for Tel Aviv, which compares the city to Miami, emphasizing both of their famous beaches.
- Miami of Morocco - a nickname for Agadir, Morocco, that compares the cities for their beaches.
- Miami of the North - popularized by developer Carl G. Fisher as a name for Montauk, New York; allegedly a vacation destination with beaches like Miami.
- Miami of South Africa - a nickname for Durban, that intends to compare Durban's beaches to Miami's.
- Miami of South Korea - a nickname for Busan, which compares it's beaches and tourist infrastructure to Miami.
