= Chauve =

Chauve or Chauvé may refer to:

- Chauvé
- Mount Chauve

== People with the surname ==
- Darlyne Chauve

== See also ==
- La Cantatrice Chauve
- La Chauve-Souris, touring review of the early 20th century
- Chauve-souris, medieval polearm
