= Dickinson Law Review =

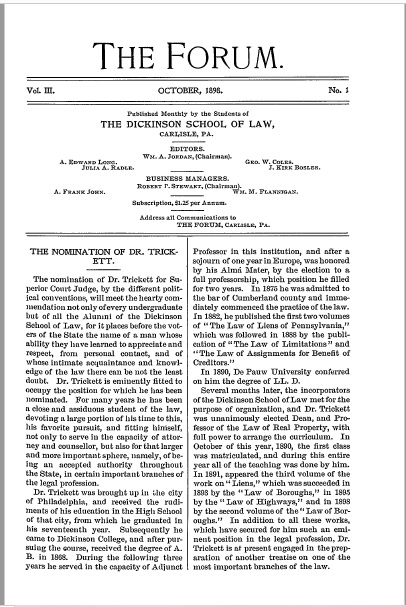
- Discipline: Law review
- Language: English

Publication details
- Former names: The Forum; Penn State Law Review
- History: 1897 to present
- Publisher: Penn State Dickinson Law (United States)
- Frequency: Triannually

Standard abbreviations
- Bluebook: Dickinson L. R.
- ISO 4: Dickinson Law Rev.

Indexing
- ISSN: 2574-2604
- OCLC no.: 1001281686

Links
- Journal homepage

Dickinson Law Review is the flagship law review of Penn State Dickinson Law. Founded in 1897 as The Forum, it is the fifth oldest law review in continuous print in the United States. From 1898–1899, Julia Radle, the first female student in the school's history, was the editor-in-chief of the law review. It is believed that Ms. Radle may have been the first female in the United States to serve in this capacity.

When the Dickinson Law School merged with Penn State University in 2003, the name of the periodical was changed to the Penn State Law Review. Following the separation of the Penn State Law and Penn State Dickinson Law campuses into separately-accredited law schools in 2016, the periodical was renamed Dickinson Law Review, while the Penn State Law Review was retained by Penn State Law.
