= Razing Liberty Square =

2023 documentary film

- Directed by: Katja Esson
- Produced by: Katja Esson; Ann Bennett; Corinna Sager
- Cinematography: Hector David Rosales
- Edited by: Flavia de Souza; Susanne Schiebler; Leigh Johnson
- Music by: Gary Gunn
- Production companies: Penelope Pictures; Shorelight Pictures
- Distributed by: PBS (Independent Lens)
- Release date: 2023
- Running time: 86 minutes
- Country: United States
- Language: English

Razing Liberty Square is a 2023 documentary film directed by Academy Award-nominated filmmaker Katja Esson about the demolition and redevelopment of Liberty Square, a public housing apartment complex in the Liberty City neighborhood of Miami, Florida.

== Release ==
Razing Liberty Square premiered at the Human Rights Watch Film Festival in New York City in June 2023.

The film was broadcast nationally on PBS as part of the Independent Lens series on January 29, 2024, and subsequently became available for streaming on PBS platforms.

== Reception ==
In 2025, Razing Liberty Square was nominated for a News & Documentary Emmy Award.

On review aggregator Rotten Tomatoes, the film holds a 100% approval rating.

Writing in Politico, Gloria Gonzales described Razing Liberty Square as a documentary that tells the story of gentrification in Miami's Liberty City neighborhood.

Ms. magazine praised Esson's approach to documentary filmmaking, writing that "an effective and ethical documentarian gains the trust of her subjects" and that "the strength of this relationship... shines through in Katja Esson's new film." The review concluded that the film offers "an incisive reflection on the price of gentrification and the impacts of climate change on communities of color."

In its Best of Miami 2024 issue, Miami New Times named Razing Liberty Square "Best Miami Documentary," describing it as "a fierce investigation into the disproportionate effects of climate change on Black communities."

== Awards ==
2023 – Winner, Woodstock Film Festival – World of HA Change-Maker Award. 2023 – Nominated, Hawaiʻi International Film Festival – Kaʻu Ka Hōkū Award. 2023 – Nominated, Jackson Wild Media Awards – Climate Stories – Long Form. 2023 – Nominated, Morehouse College Human Rights Film Festival – Documentary Feature. 2024 – Winner, Anthem Awards – Sustainability, Environment & Climate – Awareness & Media (For Profit). 2025 – Nominated, News and Documentary Emmy Awards – News & Documentary Emmy Award.
