= Ketanji Brown Jackson =

US Supreme Court justice since 2022

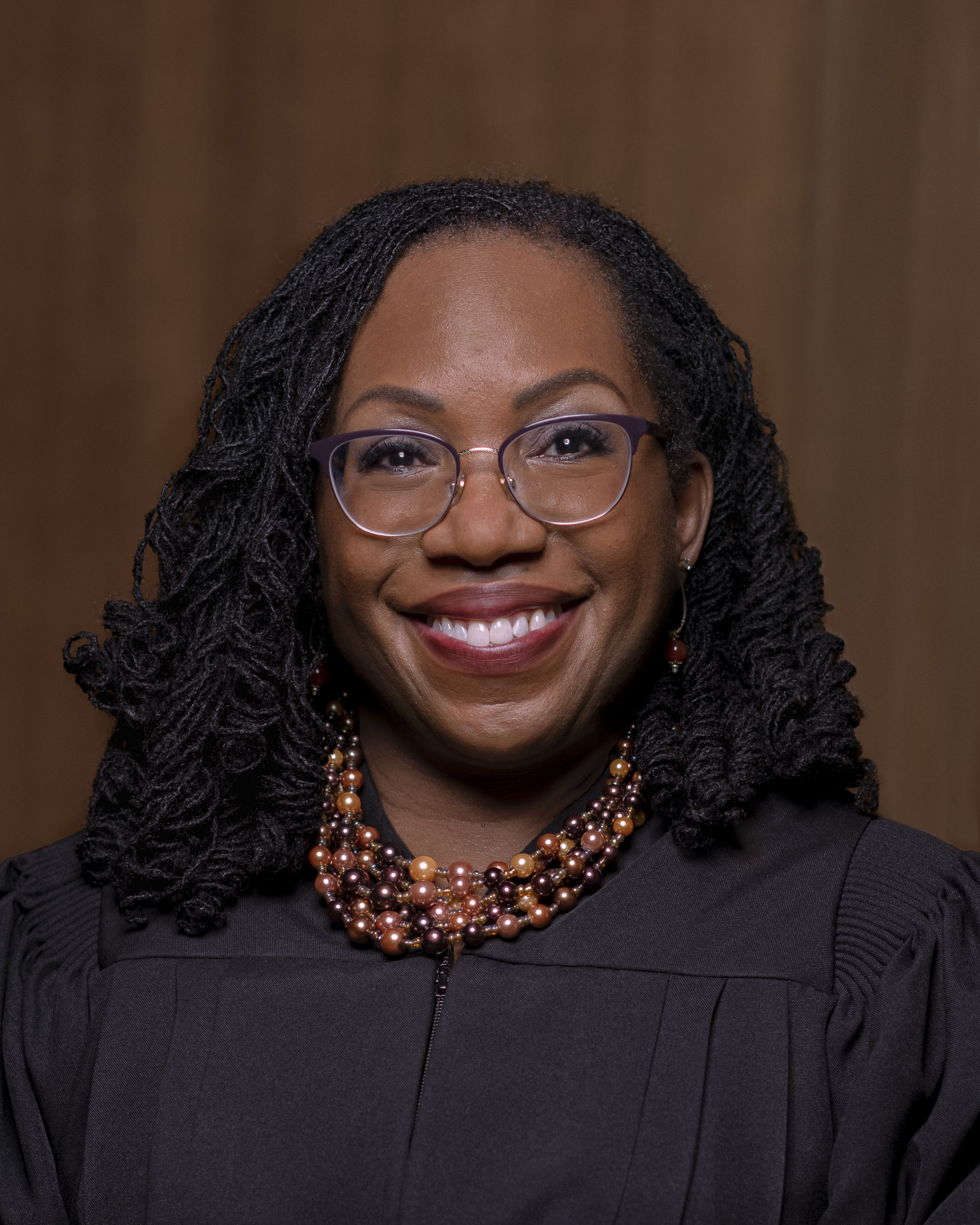
- Official portrait, 2022

Associate Justice of the Supreme Court of the United States
- Incumbent
- Assumed office June 30, 2022
- Appointed by: Joe Biden
- Preceded by: Stephen Breyer

Judge of the United States Court of Appeals for the District of Columbia Circuit
- In office June 17, 2021 – June 29, 2022
- Appointed by: Joe Biden
- Preceded by: Merrick Garland
- Succeeded by: Florence Y. Pan

Judge of the United States District Court for the District of Columbia
- In office March 26, 2013 – June 17, 2021
- Appointed by: Barack Obama
- Preceded by: Henry H. Kennedy Jr.
- Succeeded by: Florence Y. Pan

Vice Chair of the United States Sentencing Commission
- In office February 12, 2010 – December 2014
- President: Barack Obama
- Preceded by: Rubén Castillo
- Succeeded by: L. Felipe Restrepo

Personal details
- Born: Ketanji Onyika Brown; September 14, 1970 (age 56) Washington, D.C., U.S.
- Spouse: Patrick Jackson (m. 1996)
- Children: 2
- Relatives: Calvin Ross (uncle)
- Education: Harvard University (BA, JD)
- Jackson's voice Jackson delivering the decision for Lac du Flambeau Band of Lake Superior Chippewa Indians v. Coughlin. Recorded June 15, 2023

Ketanji Onyika Brown Jackson (née Brown; /kəˈtɑːndʒi/ kə-TAHN-jee; born September 14, 1970) is an American lawyer and jurist who is an associate justice of the Supreme Court of the United States. Jackson was nominated to the U.S. Supreme Court by President Joe Biden on February 25, 2022, and confirmed by the United States Senate and sworn into office that same year. She is the first Black woman, the first former federal public defender, and the sixth woman to serve on the U.S. Supreme Court.

Jackson was born in Washington, D.C., and raised in Miami, Florida. She received her undergraduate and legal education at Harvard University, where she served as an editor of the Harvard Law Review, and clerked for Justice Stephen Breyer, whose seat she later assumed on the Supreme Court. From 2010 to 2014, Jackson was the vice chairperson of the United States Sentencing Commission. In 2013, she was appointed by President Barack Obama to serve as a district judge for the United States District Court for the District of Columbia. President Joe Biden elevated her to the United States Court of Appeals for the District of Columbia Circuit in 2021, where she served until 2022. Jackson served as a Harvard Board of Overseers member from 2016 to 2022.

Alongside justices Elena Kagan and Sonia Sotomayor, Jackson is considered part of the Roberts Court's liberal wing.

== Early life and education ==
Jackson was born on September 14, 1970, in Washington, D.C., to parents who were both teachers and had been educated at historically Black colleges and universities. Her father, Johnny Brown, graduated from the University of Miami School of Law and became chief attorney for the Miami-Dade County School Board. Her mother, Ellery, was the school principal at the New World School of the Arts in Miami. One of her uncles, Calvin Ross, served as the police chief of the Miami Police Department. Her paternal great-great-great-grandfather was Olmstead Rutherford, who was enslaved by John H. Rutherford on a Georgia plantation.

Jackson grew up in Miami and attended Miami Palmetto Senior High School. She distinguished herself as a champion debater, winning the national oratory title at the National Catholic Forensic League championships in New Orleans during her senior year. She has recalled her experience with high school debate as one "that I can say without hesitation was the one activity that best prepared me for future success in law and in life." In 1988, Jackson graduated from Palmetto as senior class president. In her high school yearbook, she was quoted as saying that she wanted "to go into law and eventually have a judicial appointment".

After high school, Jackson matriculated at Harvard University to study government, having applied despite her guidance counselor's advice to set her sights lower. She took classes in drama and performed improv comedy, forming a diverse friend group. As a member of the Black Students Association, she led protests against a student who displayed a Confederate flag from his dormitory window and protested the lack of full-time professors in the Afro-American Studies Department. While a freshman, Jackson enrolled in Michael Sandel's course Justice, which she has called a major influence during her undergraduate years. She graduated from Harvard in 1992 with a Bachelor of Arts, magna cum laude. Her senior thesis was titled "The Hand of Oppression: Plea Bargaining Processes and the Coercion of Criminal Defendants".

From 1992 to 1993, Jackson worked as a staff reporter and researcher for Time magazine. She then attended Harvard Law School, where she was a supervising editor of the Harvard Law Review, graduating in 1996 with a Juris Doctor, cum laude.

== Early career ==
After law school, Jackson was a law clerk to Judge Patti B. Saris of the United States District Court for the District of Massachusetts from 1996 to 1997 and to Judge Bruce M. Selya of the United States Court of Appeals for the First Circuit from 1997 to 1998. She spent a year in private practice at the Washington, D.C., law firm of Miller Cassidy Larroca & Lewin (now part of Baker Botts), then clerked for Supreme Court Justice Stephen Breyer from 1999 to 2000.

Jackson returned to private legal practice at the law firm of Goodwin Procter from 2000 to 2002, then under Kenneth Feinberg at the law firm now called Feinberg & Rozen LLP from 2002 to 2003. From 2003 to 2005, she was an assistant special counsel to the United States Sentencing Commission. From 2005 to 2007, Jackson was an assistant federal public defender in Washington, D.C., where she handled cases before the United States Court of Appeals for the District of Columbia Circuit. A review by The Washington Post of cases Jackson handled during her time as a public defender showed that "she won uncommon victories against the government that shortened or erased lengthy prison terms". From 2007 to 2010, Jackson was an appellate specialist in private practice at the law firm of Morrison & Foerster.

== United States Sentencing Commission (2010–2014) ==
On July 23, 2009, President Obama nominated Jackson as vice chair of the United States Sentencing Commission. The Senate Judiciary Committee favorably reported her nomination by voice vote on November 5, 2009. The Senate confirmed her nomination by voice vote on February 11, 2010. She succeeded Michael E. Horowitz, who had served from 2003 until 2009. Jackson served on the Sentencing Commission until 2014. During her time on the commission, it retroactively amended the sentencing guidelines to reduce the guideline range for crack cocaine offenses, and enacted the "drugs minus two" amendment, which implemented a two offense-level reduction for drug crimes.

== District Court (2013–2021) ==
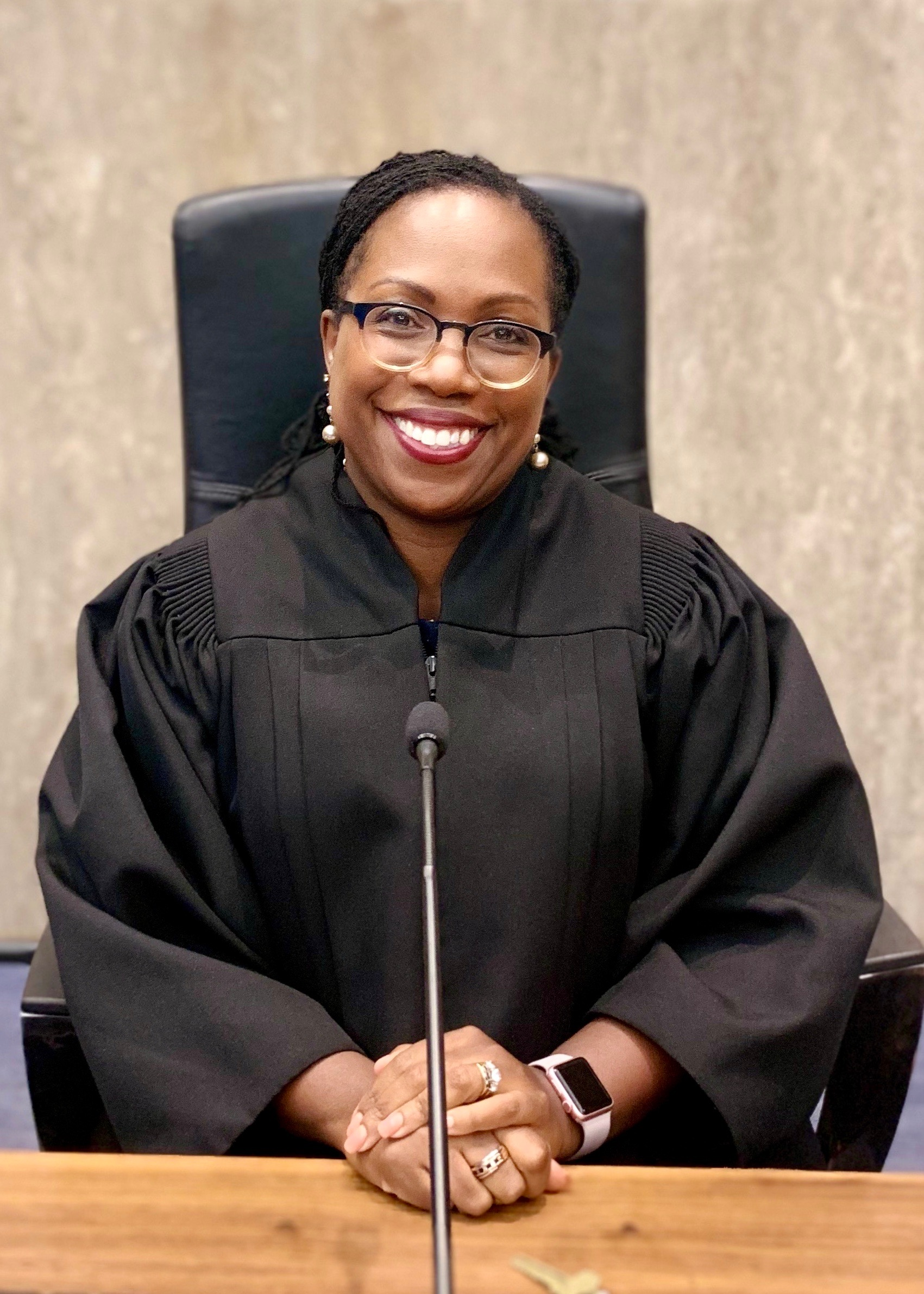
Jackson on the bench of the U.S. District Court for the District of Columbia (pictured in 2019)

On September 20, 2012, Obama nominated Jackson to serve as a United States district judge for the District of Columbia to the seat vacated by retiring judge Henry H. Kennedy Jr. Republican United States Representative Paul Ryan, a relative by marriage, introduced Jackson at her December 2012 confirmation hearing and said, "Our politics may differ, but my praise for Ketanji's intellect, for her character, for her integrity, it is unequivocal." On February 14, 2013, the Senate Judiciary Committee favorably reported her nomination by voice vote. She was confirmed by the Senate by voice vote on March 22, received her commission on March 26, and was sworn in by Justice Breyer in May. Her service as a district judge ended on June 17, 2021, when she was elevated to the court of appeals.

During her time on the district court, Jackson wrote multiple decisions adverse to the positions of the Trump administration. In her opinion ordering Trump's former White House counsel Don McGahn to comply with a legislative subpoena, she wrote that "presidents are not kings". Jackson handled a number of challenges to executive agency actions that raised questions of administrative law. She also issued rulings in several cases that gained particular political attention.

Bloomberg Law reported in spring 2021 that conservative activists were pointing to certain decisions by Jackson that had been reversed on appeal as a "potential blemish on her record". In 2019, Jackson ruled that provisions in three Trump executive orders conflicted with federal employee rights to collective bargaining. Her decision was reversed unanimously by the District of Columbia Circuit. The District of Columbia Circuit also reversed another 2019 decision, involving a challenge to a Department of Homeland Security decision to expand the agency's definition of which non-citizens can be deported. Alliance for Justice President Nan Aron defended Jackson's record, saying she "has written nearly 600 opinions and been reversed less than twelve times".

=== Selected rulings ===
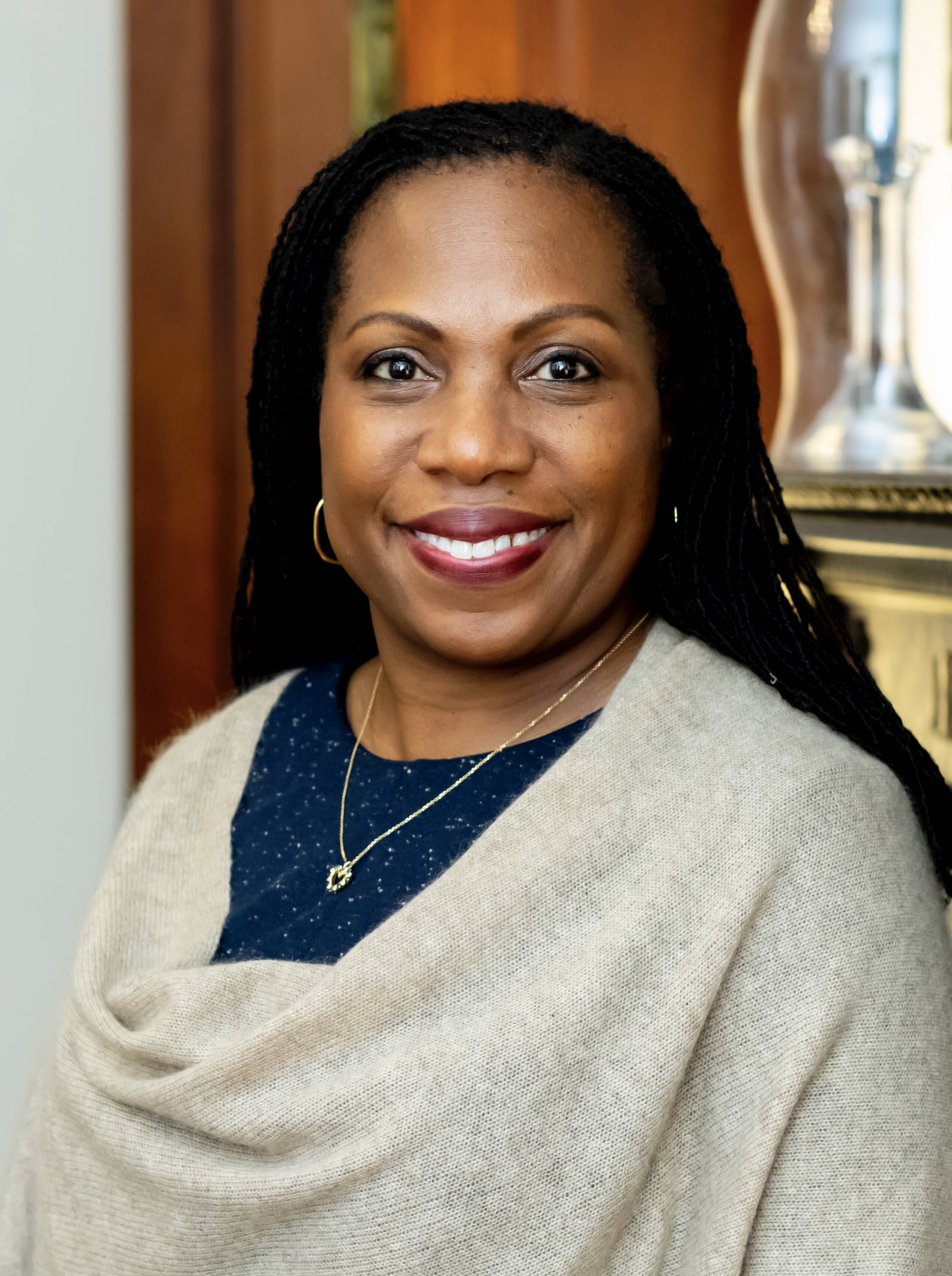
Jackson in 2020

In American Meat Institute v. United States Department of Agriculture (2013), Jackson rejected the meat packing industry's request for a preliminary injunction to block a United States Department of Agriculture rule requiring them to identify animals' country of origin. Jackson found that the rule likely did not violate the First Amendment.

In Depomed v. Department of Health and Human Services (2014), Jackson ruled that the Food and Drug Administration (FDA) had violated the Administrative Procedure Act when it failed to grant pharmaceutical company Depomed market exclusivity for its orphan drug Gralise. She concluded that the Orphan Drug Act required the FDA to grant Gralise exclusivity.

In Pierce v. District of Columbia (2015), Jackson ruled that the District of Columbia Department of Corrections violated the rights of a deaf inmate under the Americans with Disabilities Act because jail officials failed to provide the inmate with reasonable accommodations, or to assess his need for reasonable accommodations, during his detention in 2012. She held that "the District's willful blindness regarding" Pierce's need for accommodation and its half-hearted attempt to provide Pierce with a random assortment of auxiliary aids—and only after he specifically requested them—fell far short of what the law requires."

In April and June 2018, Jackson presided over two cases challenging the Department of Health and Human Services' decision to terminate grants for teen pregnancy prevention programs two years early. She ruled that the decision to terminate the grants early without explanation was arbitrary and capricious.

In American Federation of Government Employees, AFL-CIO v. Trump (2018), Jackson invalidated provisions of three executive orders that would have limited the time federal employee labor union officials could spend with union members, the issues that unions could bargain over in negotiations, and the rights of disciplined workers to appeal disciplinary actions. She ruled that the executive orders violated the right of federal employees to collectively bargain, as guaranteed by the Federal Service Labor-Management Relations Statute. The District of Columbia Circuit vacated this ruling on jurisdictional grounds in 2019.

In 2018, Jackson dismissed 40 wrongful death and product liability lawsuits stemming from the disappearance of Malaysia Airlines Flight 370, which had been combined into a single multidistrict litigation. She held that under the doctrine of forum non conveniens, the suits should be brought in Malaysia, not the United States. The District of Columbia Circuit affirmed this ruling in 2020.

In 2019, in Center for Biological Diversity v. McAleenan, Jackson held that Congress had, through the Illegal Immigration Reform and Immigrant Responsibility Act, stripped federal courts of jurisdiction to hear non-constitutional challenges to the United States Secretary of Homeland Security's decision to waive certain environmental requirements to facilitate construction of a border wall on the United States and Mexico border.

In 2019, Jackson issued a preliminary injunction in Make The Road New York v. McAleenan, blocking a Trump administration rule that would have expanded expedited removal ("fast-track" deportations) without immigration court hearings for undocumented immigrants. She found that the United States Department of Homeland Security had violated the Administrative Procedure Act (APA) because its decision was arbitrary and capricious and the agency did not seek public comment before issuing the rule. In a 2–1 ruling in 2020, the United States Court of Appeals for the District of Columbia Circuit reversed the entry of the preliminary injunction, ruling that the IIRIRA (by committing the matter to the executive branch's "sole and unreviewable discretion") precluded APA review of the decision.

In 2019, Jackson issued a ruling in Committee on the Judiciary of the United States House of Representatives v. McGahn, in which the House Committee on the Judiciary sued former White House Counsel Don McGahn to compel him to comply with the subpoena to appear at an impeachment inquiry hearing on issues of alleged obstruction of justice by the Trump administration. McGahn declined to comply with the subpoena after President Donald Trump, relying on a legal theory of executive testimonial immunity, ordered McGahn not to testify. In a lengthy opinion, Jackson ruled in favor of the House Committee and held that senior-level presidential aides "who have been subpoenaed for testimony by an authorized committee of Congress must appear for testimony in response to that subpoena" even if the president orders them not to do so. Jackson rejected the administration's assertion of executive testimonial immunity by holding that "with respect to senior-level presidential aides, absolute immunity from compelled congressional process simply does not exist". According to her, that conclusion was "inescapable precisely because compulsory appearance by dint of a subpoena is a legal construct, not a political one, and per the Constitution, no one is above the law." Jackson's use of the phrase "presidents are not kings" gained popular attention in subsequent media reporting on the ruling. Noting that she took four months to resolve the case, including writing a 120-page opinion, The Washington Post wrote: "That slow pace contributed to helping Mr. Trump run out the clock on the congressional oversight effort before the 2020 election." The ruling was appealed by the United States Department of Justice, and the District of Columbia Circuit affirmed part of Jackson's decision in August 2020. While the case remained pending, on June 4, 2021, McGahn testified behind closed doors under an agreement reached with the Biden administration.

== United States Court of Appeals (2021–2022) ==
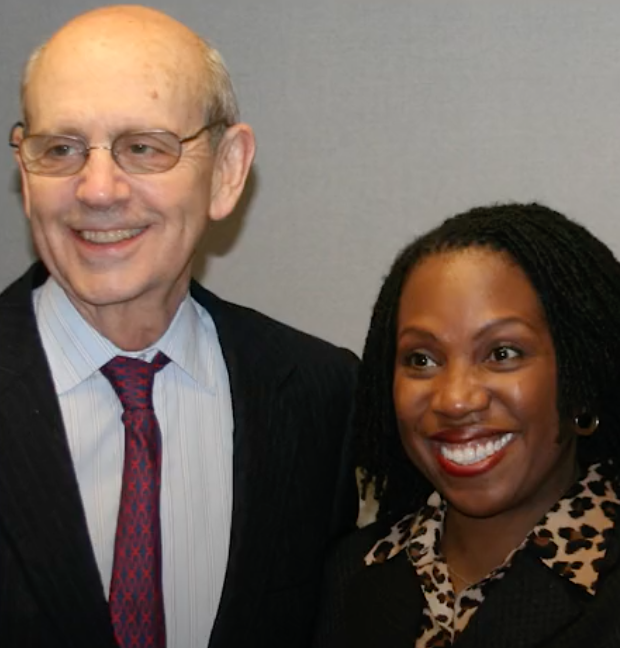
Judge Jackson with Justice Stephen Breyer

On March 30, 2021, President Biden announced his intention to nominate Jackson as a United States circuit judge for the District of Columbia Circuit. On April 19, 2021, her nomination was sent to the Senate. Biden nominated Jackson to the seat vacated by Judge Merrick Garland, who had stepped down to become United States Attorney General. The American Bar Association appraised Jackson as "well qualified with no recusals or abstentions".

On April 28, 2021, a hearing on her nomination was held before the Senate Judiciary Committee. During her confirmation hearing, Jackson was questioned about several of her rulings against the Trump administration. On May 20, Jackson's nomination was reported out of committee by a 13–9 vote. On June 8, Majority Leader Chuck Schumer filed cloture on her nomination. On June 10, the Senate invoked cloture on her nomination by a 52–46 vote. On June 14, her nomination was confirmed by a 53–44 vote. Republican senators Susan Collins, Lindsey Graham, and Lisa Murkowski joined all 50 Democrats in voting to confirm Jackson. She received her judicial commission on June 17, 2021. Her service as a circuit judge ended on June 29, 2022, the day before she was sworn in as an Associate Justice of the United States Supreme Court.

During her time on the Circuit Court Jackson authored two majority opinions, American Federation of Government Employees v. FLRA and Wye Oak Technology, Inc. v. Republic of Iraq. In American Federation of Government Employees, her first written opinion for the court of appeals, Jackson, writing for a unanimous panel, wrote that a 2020 FLRA law change that moved to allow for collective bargaining negotiations with unions only when the negotiated working condition changes constituted a "substantial impact", stood in violation with United States Code 5 § 706. In her opinion, Jackson rejected arguments that the previously established de minimis standard warranted replacement, objecting to claims that the standard was "unpredictable" in its application or inconsistent with federal labor law. In addition, she argued that the replacement standard failed to be affirmatively more successful when compared to the existing de minimis standard, as no comparative analysis between the two had occurred, and that the existing one could therefore not be justifiably replaced.

In Wye Oak Technology, Inc. v. Republic of Iraq Jackson wrote for a unanimous panel regarding the Foreign Sovereign Immunities Act's commercial activity exemptions. In her opinion, Jackson addressed prior litigation by Wye Oak Technology which had determined that, under the second of the Act's three exemption clauses, United States courts were permitted to exercise jurisdiction over Iraq to facilitate the payment of their invoices. The clause Wye Oak used in litigation provided for the exemption so long as "an act is performed in the United States in connection with the foreign state’s outside-United States commercial activity". Jackson determined that this clause was applicable only when an act is performed by a foreign state within the United States, vacating the prior verdict permitting for the exemption, as all acts performed within the United States were attributable to Wye Oak and not Iraq. Jackson subsequently remanded the case for consideration to the District Court for the District of Columbia to determine whether additional commercial activity exemptions such as the "direct effect" clause were applicable in its stead.

== Nomination to the Supreme Court ==
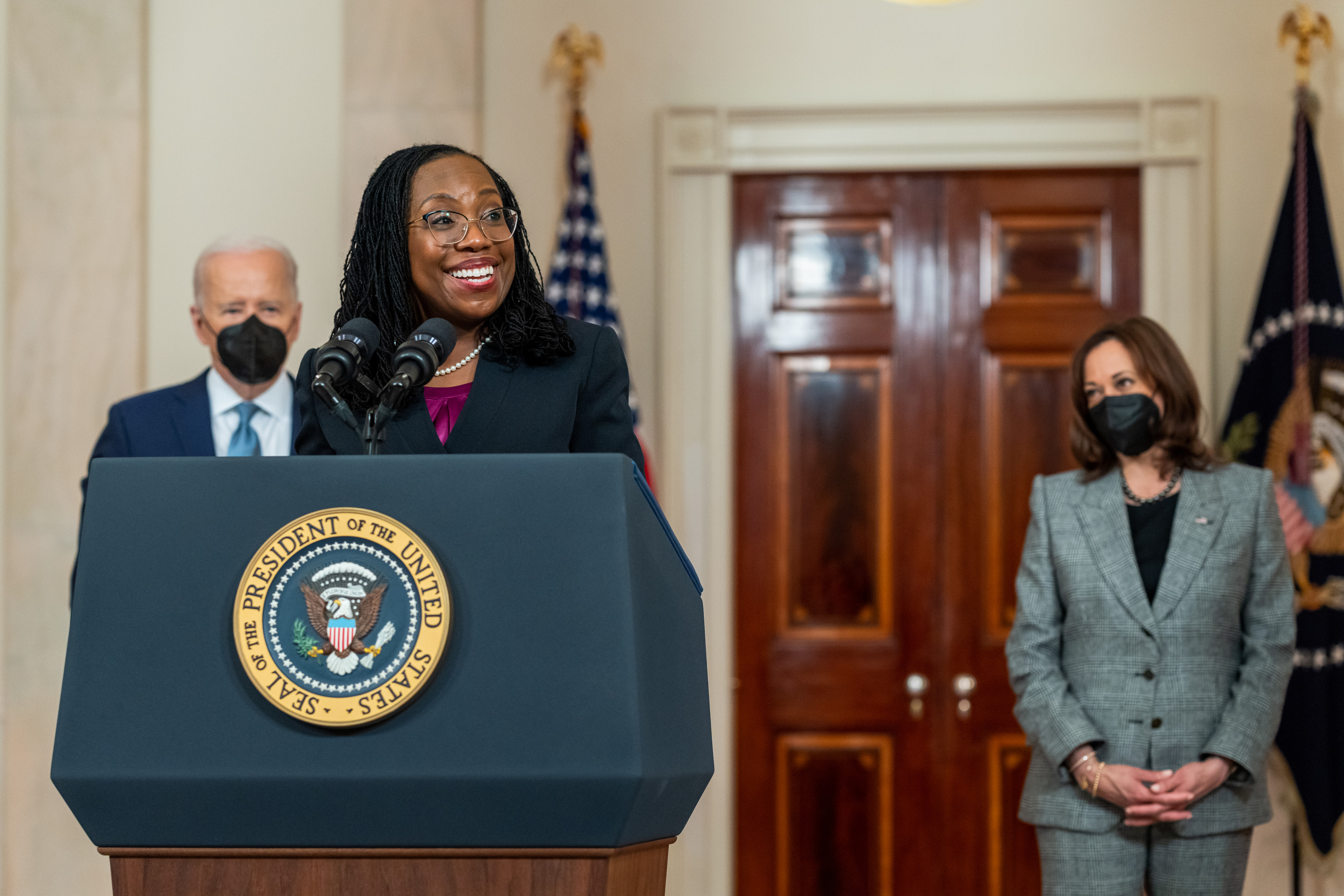
Jackson delivers remarks on her nomination in the Grand Foyer of the White House on February 25, 2022

In early 2016, Obama administration officials vetted Jackson as a potential nominee to the Supreme Court of the United States to fill the vacancy left by the death of Justice Antonin Scalia. Jackson was one of five candidates interviewed as a potential nominee.

In early 2022, news outlets speculated that Biden would nominate Jackson to the United States Supreme Court to fill the seat vacated by Justice Breyer. Biden pledged during the 2020 United States presidential election campaign to appoint a Black woman to the court should a vacancy occur. Jackson's appointment to the United States Court of Appeals for the District of Columbia Circuit, considered the second-most influential federal court, was viewed as preparation for a potential promotion to the Supreme Court.

President Joe Biden and vice president Kamala Harris deliver remarks upon Jackson's Supreme Court confirmation on April 8, 2022

Jackson's potential nomination to the Supreme Court was supported by civil rights and liberal advocacy organizations. Her potential nomination was opposed by Republican Party leaders and senators. The Washington Post wrote that Jackson's experience as a public defender "has endeared her to the more liberal base of the Democratic Party". While her supporters have touted her history as a public defender as an asset, during her 2021 confirmation hearing, Republicans tried to cast it as a liability.

On February 25, 2022, Biden announced that Jackson was his nominee to be an associate justice of the Supreme Court. Her nomination was sent to the Senate on February 28. Her confirmation hearing before the Senate Judiciary Committee was held on March 21. After the Judiciary Committee deadlocked on her nomination by an 11–11 vote, the Senate discharged the committee from further consideration of her nomination by a 53–47 vote. The next day, the Senate proceeded to the consideration of her nomination by a 53–47 vote, and Majority Leader Chuck Schumer then filed cloture on her nomination. On April 7, the Senate invoked cloture on her nomination by a 53–47 vote. Later that day, she was confirmed by the same margin. Republicans Mitt Romney, Lisa Murkowski, and Susan Collins joined all Democrats in confirming Jackson to the Supreme Court. She received her judicial commission as an associate justice on April 8. She was sworn in and became an associate justice at noon on June 30, 2022, when Breyer's retirement went into effect.

== United States Supreme Court (2022–present) ==
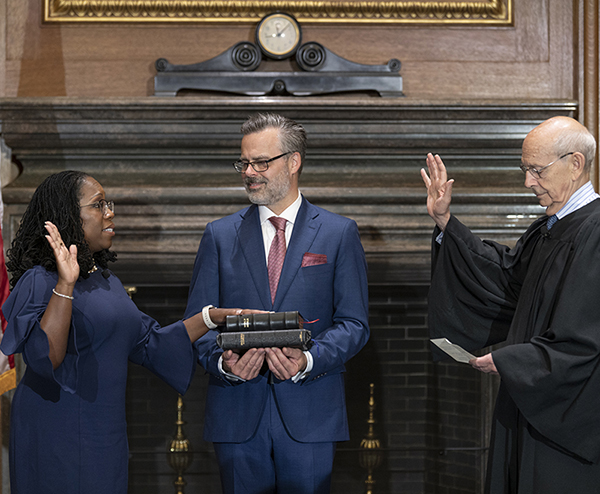
Justice Breyer administering the judicial oath of office to Jackson on June 30, 2022

The Supreme Court released its final merit opinions on the morning of June 30, 2022. At noon, Breyer officially retired and Jackson was sworn in, becoming the first Black woman and the first former federal public defender to serve on the Supreme Court. On September 28, 2022, Jackson was assigned as the circuit justice for the First Circuit.

On July 21, Jackson voted on her first Supreme Court case, joining the dissent in a 5–4 decision refusing to block a district court ruling that prevented the Biden administration from setting new enforcement priorities for immigrants entering the United States or living in the country illegally. She participated in her first oral argument as an associate justice on October 3, in Sackett v. Environmental Protection Agency. On November 7 she wrote her first opinion, a two-page dissent from a denial of review in the case of a death row inmate in Chinn v. Shoop; the opinion was joined by Justice Sotomayor.

Two contributors to SCOTUSBlog noted that, since joining the Court at the beginning of the 2022 term, Jackson was the most active participant in oral arguments, speaking an average of 1,350 words per argument, while the eight other justices each spoke on average fewer than 1,000. On February 28, 2023, Jackson authored her first majority opinion for a unanimous court in Delaware v. Pennsylvania, which involved how unclaimed money from MoneyGrams are distributed among individual states.

In 2025, Justice Amy Coney Barrett criticized Jackson's dissent in Trump v. CASA, writing, "Justice Jackson decries an imperial Executive while embracing an imperial Judiciary." On July 8, 2025, in AFGE v. Trump, the Supreme Court issued an emergency order on Trump's federal workforce reorganization, ruling in Trump's favor 8–1, with Jackson the lone dissenter. It was an appeal of a lower court ruling in the Northern District of California. Jackson argued that Trump's reorganization of the United States government was an illegal restructuring of the federal bureaucracy. Justice Sonia Sotomayor said the case was not about the merits of the reorganization plans themselves and pointed out that the case could proceed and other aspects challenged.

=== Labor disputes ===
On June 1, 2023, Jackson wrote the sole dissenting opinion in Glacier Northwest, Inc. v. Teamsters, concerning the power of employers to sue labor unions regarding the destruction of employer property following a strike. In her opinion, she argued that further deference to the National Labor Relations Board was justified given the precedent of cases such as San Diego Building Trades Council v. Garmon that stipulate that the NLRA preempts state law when the two conflict. Jackson further contended that the majority opinion failed "Congress's intent with respect to the Board's primary role in adjudicating labor disputes", with its deference to state actions risking "erosion of the right to strike". In her conclusion, she emphasized these points, writing: "Workers are not indentured servants, bound to continue laboring until any planned work stoppage would be as painless as possible for their master. They are employees whose collective and peaceful decision to withhold their labor is protected by the NLRA even if economic injury results".

On June 13, 2024, Jackson wrote an opinion, concurring in part and dissenting in part, in Starbucks Corporation v. McKinney. In it, she agreed that the case should be reheard in the lower courts using the four criteria tests of Winter v. Natural Resources Defense Council, but argued that the majority failed to follow the NLRA's directives of court deference to NLRB authority in labor disputes. Arguing that the court was failing to issue proper deference to the NLRB, Jackson wrote, "I am loath to bless this aggrandizement of judicial power where Congress has so plainly limited the discretion of the courts, and where it so clearly intends for the expert agency it has created to make the primary determinations".

=== Affirmative action ===
Jackson dissented from the Supreme Court's ruling in Students for Fair Admissions v. University of North Carolina, the companion case to Students for Fair Admissions v. President and Fellows of Harvard College, which limited the use of racial preferences in university admissions. In her dissent, Jackson emphasized the relationship between Black Americans and the United States government, writing, "Our country has never been colorblind", and associating affirmative action as a corrective marker in reconciliation. In doing so, she expressed opposition to the majority's usage of the Equal Protection Clause, writing, "To impose this result in that Clause’s name when it requires no such thing, and to thereby obstruct our collective progress toward the full realization of the Clause’s promise, is truly a tragedy for us all".

=== Judicial philosophy ===
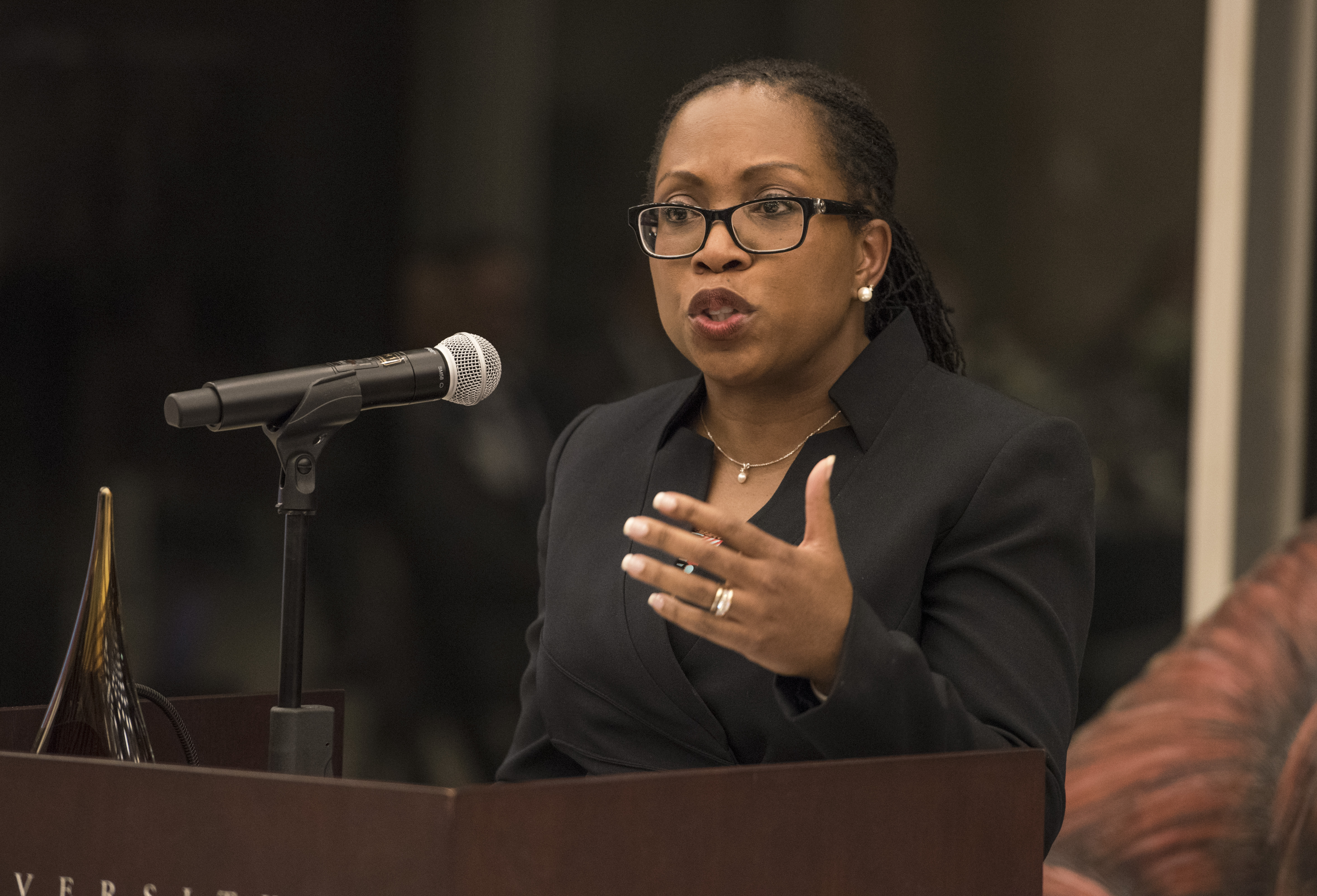
Judge Jackson at the James B. Parsons Legacy Dinner on February 24, 2020

Jackson has said she does not have a particular judicial philosophy, but rather has a perspective on legal analysis or a "judicial methodology". Though she has not embraced the label, Jackson has expressed that she sees value in originalism, saying the "Constitution is fixed in its meaning", and has explicitly criticized living constitutionalism.

In January 2022, The New York Times reported that Jackson had "not yet written a body of appeals court opinions expressing a legal philosophy" because she had joined the United States Court of Appeals for the District of Columbia Circuit in the summer of 2021. However, The Times said, Jackson's earlier rulings "comported with those of a liberal-leaning judge", including her opinions blocking various Trump administration actions. Additionally, a review of over 500 of her judicial opinions indicated that she would likely be as liberal as Breyer, the justice she replaced.

According to Sahil Kapur, writing for NBC News, "Jackson fits well with the Democratic Party and the progressive movement's agenda" due to her relative youth, background as a public defender, and history of labor-friendly rulings.

Politico reported that "Jackson is popular with liberal legal activists looking to replace Breyer with a justice willing to engage in ideological combat with the court's conservatives."

== Personal life ==
In 1996, Jackson married surgeon Patrick Graves Jackson, whom she met at Harvard College. He is a descendant of Continental Congress delegate Jonathan Jackson and is related to United States Supreme Court justice Oliver Wendell Holmes Jr. The couple have two daughters. Jackson is a non-denominational Protestant. In a 2017 speech, she said, "I am fairly certain that if you traced my family lineage back past my grandparents—who were raised in Georgia, by the way—you would find that my ancestors were slaves on both sides." Jackson's paternal ancestry can be traced to Houston County, Georgia, while her maternal ancestry can be traced to Calhoun County, Georgia. Through her marriage, Jackson is related to former speaker of the House Paul Ryan. (Note: Her husband's twin brother (i.e., her brother-in-law) is married to Ryan's wife's sister (i.e., his sister-in-law).)

In 1989, while Jackson was an undergraduate at Harvard, her uncle Thomas Brown Jr. was sentenced to life in prison for a nonviolent cocaine conviction after federal agents found 14 kilograms of cocaine wrapped in duct tape. Years later, Jackson persuaded a law firm to take his case pro bono, and President Barack Obama eventually commuted his sentence.

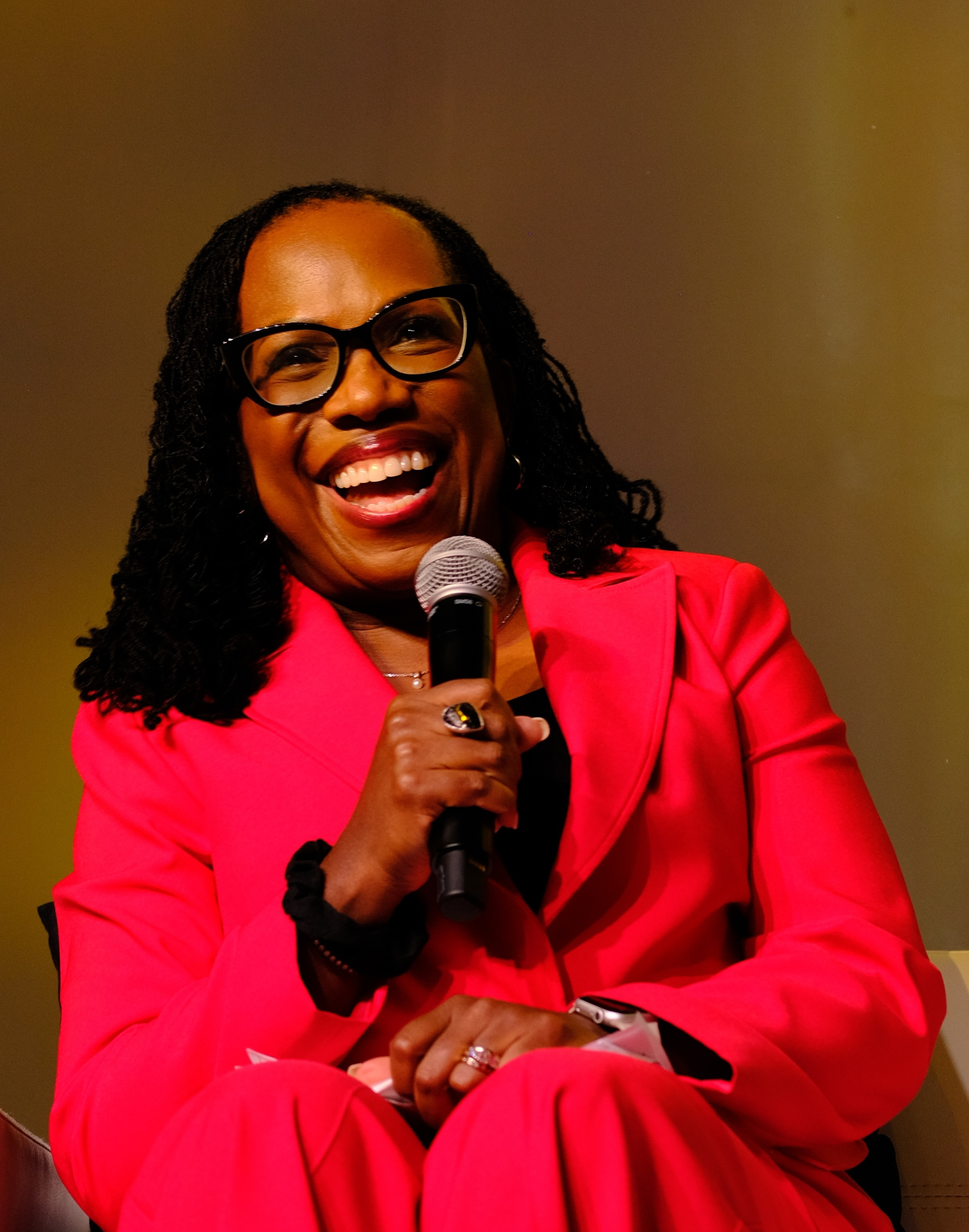
Ketanji Brown Jackson at the Global Black Economic Forum at Essence Festival 2025

Jackson appeared in the Broadway production of & Juliet one night in December 2024. After receiving the invitation to portray herself in a brief cameo, she called it a "lifelong dream of hers". She took acting classes as an undergraduate at Harvard, and said that prepared her for her role on Broadway. The role was written for her.

Jackson was nominated for Best Audio Book, Narration, and Storytelling at the 2026 Grammy Awards for her recording of Lovely One.

=== Affiliations ===
Jackson is a member of the Judicial Conference Committee on Defender Services and the Council of the American Law Institute. She previously served as a member of the Harvard Board of Overseers and on the Georgetown Day School Board of Trustees and the United States Supreme Court Fellows Commission.

From 2010 to 2011, she served on the advisory board of Montrose Christian School, a Baptist school. Jackson has served as a judge in several mock trials with the Shakespeare Theatre Company and for the Historical Society of the District of Columbia's Mock Court Program. In 2018, she presided over a mock trial hosted by Drexel University's Thomas R. Kline School of Law "to determine if Vice President Aaron Burr was guilty of murdering" Alexander Hamilton.

In 2017, Jackson presented at the University of Georgia School of Law's 35th Edith House Lecture. In 2018, she was a panelist at the National Constitution Center's town hall on Alexander Hamilton's legacy. In 2020, Jackson gave the Martin Luther King Jr. Day lecture at the University of Michigan Law School and was honored at the University of Chicago Law School's third annual Judge James B. Parsons Legacy Dinner, hosted by the school's Black Law Students Association. In 2022, she received the Academy of Achievement's Golden Plate Award, presented by Awards Council members Justice Amy Coney Barrett and retired justice Anthony Kennedy.

== Selected works ==
- Recent Case (1995). "Racketeer Influenced and Corrupt Organizations Act (RICO) – Scope of Liability after Reves v. Ernst & Young". Harvard Law Review. 108 (6): 1405–1410. doi:10.2307/1341863. JSTOR 1341863. (Note: The Harvard Law Review publishes its student contributions as "notes" without stating the author's name as part of a policy reflecting "the fact that many members of the Review besides the author make a contribution to each published piece." About the Harvard Law Review", accessed April 9, 2022.)
- Note (1996). "Prevention versus Punishment: Toward a Principled Distinction in the Restraint of Released Sex Offenders". Harvard Law Review. 109 (7): 1711–1728. doi:10.2307/1342027. JSTOR 1342027. S2CID 247656074.
- Lovely One (2024). Jackson, Ketanji Brown (September 3, 2024). Lovely One: A Memoir (First hardcover ed.). New York: Random House. ISBN 9780593729908. OCLC 1452735147.

== See also ==
- Barack Obama Supreme Court candidates
- Demographics of the Supreme Court of the United States
- Joe Biden judicial appointment controversies
- Joe Biden Supreme Court candidates
- List of African American federal judges
- List of African American jurists
- List of justices of the Supreme Court of the United States
- List of law clerks for the second seat of the Supreme Court of the United States
- List of United States Supreme Court justices by time in office

== Additional sources ==
- "Tracking the Progress of African Americans on the Editorial Rolls of America's Most Prestigious Law Journal". The Journal of Blacks in Higher Education (47): 44–46. Spring 2005. doi:10.2307/25073170. JSTOR 25073170.
- Braun, Julie A. (2022). Unland, James J. (ed.). "Ketanji Brown Jackson: Legal Philosophy of a Rookie Supreme Court Justice". Journal of Health Care Finance. doi:10.2139/ssrn.4063023. SSRN 4242313.
- Phillips, James Cleith (September 27, 2022) [27 March 2022 (posted)]. "The Linguistic Style of Judge Ketanji Brown Jackson". Penn State Law Review. 127 (1). SSRN 4063023.
- Bradley, Christy; Roland, James (Summer 2022). "Critical Thinkers for a Critical Time: Debate as a Foundation for Youth Civic Engagement". National Civic Review. 111 (2): 14–22. JSTOR 48680128.
- Bowles, Dorcas Davis; Hopps, June Gary; Strickland, Christopher (Summer 2022). "Two Firsts: A Brief Glimpse into the Lives of the First Woman-Sandra Day O'Connor and the First Black Woman- Ketanji Brown Jackson to Serve on the Supreme Court of the United States". Phylon. 59 (1). Clark Atlanta University: 49–70. JSTOR 27150914.

Legal offices
Preceded by Henry H. Kennedy Jr.	Judge of the United States District Court for the District of Columbia; 2013–2021	Succeeded by Florence Y. Pan
Preceded by Merrick Garland	Judge of the United States Court of Appeals for the District of Columbia Circuit; 2021–2022	Succeeded by Florence Y. Pan
Preceded by Stephen Breyer	Associate Justice of the Supreme Court of the United States; 2022–present	Incumbent
U.S. order of precedence (ceremonial)
Preceded by Amy Coney Barrett as Associate Justice of the Supreme Court	Order of precedence of the United States as Associate Justice of the Supreme Court	Succeeded by Retired Chief Justices of the Supreme Court; None living
Preceded by Amy Coney Barrett as Associate Justice of the Supreme Court	Order of precedence of the United States as Associate Justice of the Supreme Court	Succeeded by Otherwise Anthony Kennedy as Retired Associate Justice of the Supreme Court
