= James W. Houck =

41st Judge Advocate General of the Navy

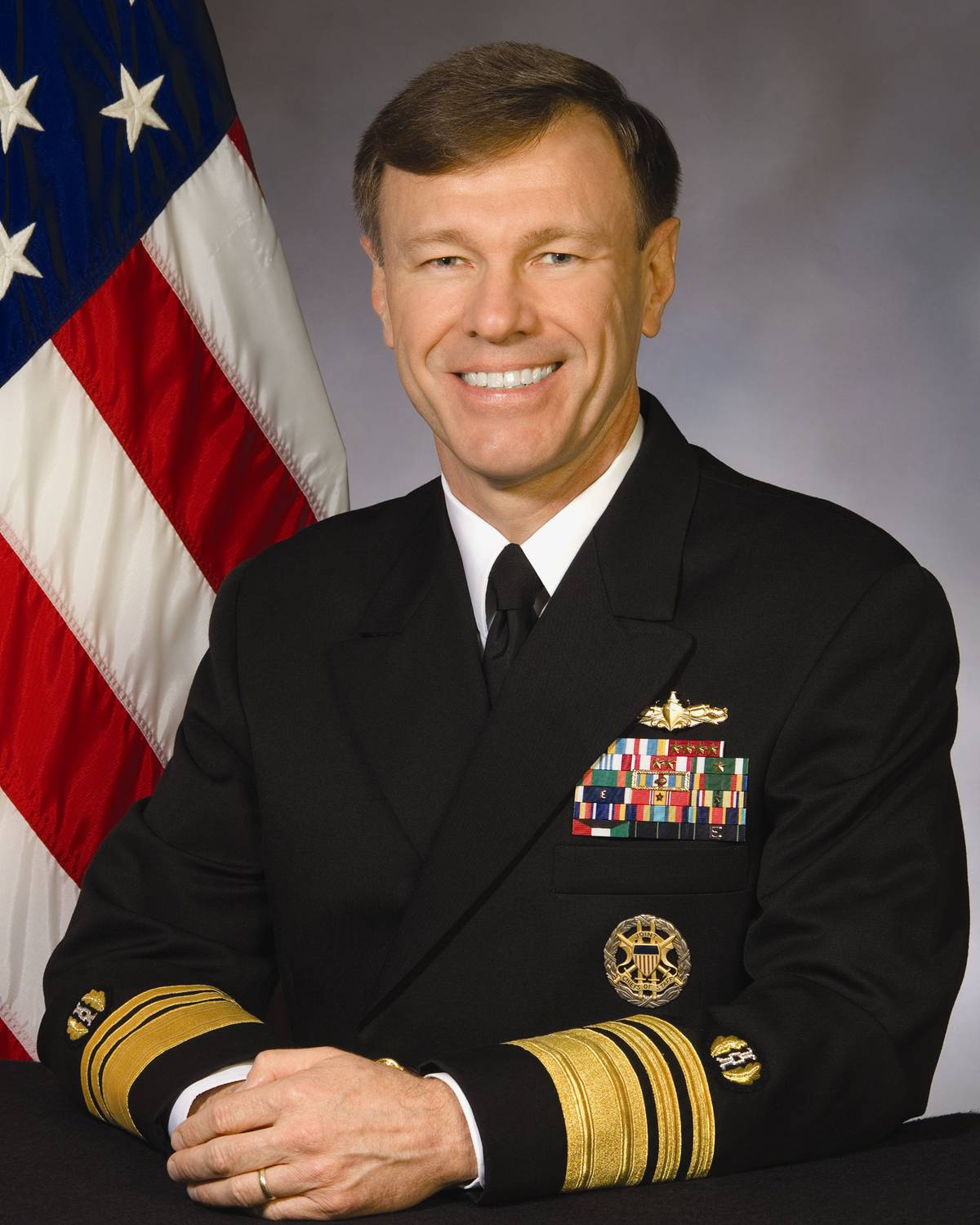
- Vice Admiral James W. Houck, USN (Ret.); 41st Judge Advocate General of the Navy
- Born: 18 April 1958 (age 68); Pittsburgh, Pennsylvania
- Alma mater: United States Naval Academy; University of Michigan; Georgetown University
- Military career
- Allegiance: United States of America
- Branch: United States Navy
- Service years: c. 1980 – 2012
- Rank: Vice Admiral
- Commands: Judge Advocate General of the Navy; Deputy Judge Advocate General of the Navy
- Awards: Navy Distinguished Service Medal (2); Defense Superior Service Medal; Legion of Merit (5)
- Other work: Distinguished Scholar in Residence, Interim Dean, Penn State Law

James W. Houck is a retired United States Navy vice admiral. He served as the 41st Judge Advocate General (JAG) of the United States Navy from 14 Aug. 2009 to 20 July 2012. He is currently on the faculty at Penn State Law and the Penn State School of International Affairs.

== Naval career ==
Following graduation from the United States Naval Academy, Houck qualified as a Surface Warfare Officer aboard the destroyer USS Caron (DD 970). He then entered the Navy's Law Education Program and graduated from the University of Michigan Law School. He later earned a Master of Laws (International and Comparative Law) from the Georgetown University Law Center.

Houck served from 2006 to 2009 as the Deputy Judge Advocate General of the Navy (DJAG) and Commander, Naval Legal Service Command. As DJAG, Houck served as the Deputy Department of Defense Representative for Ocean Policy Affairs (REPOPA).

Before his appointment to flag rank, he served as special assistant for Legal and Legislative Matters to the secretary of the Navy and later as special counsel to the Chief of Naval Operations. He also served as the senior staff judge advocate for the Commander, U.S. Fleet Forces Command/U.S. Atlantic Fleet as well as the Commander, U.S. Naval Forces Central Command/U.S. 5th Fleet in Bahrain. In command, he served as commanding officer, Naval Legal Service Office, North Central.

Houck's other assignments include service in the Office of the Legal Counsel to the chairman of the Joint Chiefs of Staff, the Navy Office of Legislative Affairs, and in the Office of the Judge Advocate General of the Navy, both as executive assistant to the JAG and as special assistant for Transformation, the JAG Corps' lead strategic planner. He began his legal career first as a trial counsel (prosecutor) and then as a defense counsel at Naval Station Mayport, Fla.

== After retirement ==
After retirement from the Navy, Houck joined Penn State Law and the Penn State School of International Affairs as a Distinguished Scholar in Residence. He became interim dean of both schools on 1 August 2013. He was succeeded as dean by Hari M. Osofsky on 1 July 2017. On July 13, 2021, he succeeded Hari M. Osofsky as Interim Dean of Penn State Law.

== Awards ==
Houck's personal decorations include the Navy Distinguished Service Medal (two awards), the Defense Superior Service Medal, the Legion of Merit (five awards), the Defense Meritorious Service Medal and the Meritorious Service Medal (three awards), the Navy Commendation Medal (two awards) and the Navy Achievement Medal.

== Personal life ==
Houck currently lives in State College, Pennsylvania with his wife, Susan.

Military offices
Preceded by Bruce E. MacDonald	41st Judge Advocate General of the Navy; 2009 – 2012	Succeeded by Nanette M. DeRenzi
