= James Houck =

James Houck may refer to:

- James R. Houck (1940–2015), professor of astronomy at Cornell University
- James W. Houck (born 1958), United States Navy admiral
