= New Covenant Presbyterian Church (Miami) =

Church in Miami, United States

Coordinates: 25.8152°N 80.2159°W

The New Covenant Presbyterian Church is a congregation of the Presbyterian Church (USA) in the Liberty City neighborhood of Miami, Florida. It is significant for being the first Southern congregation in the Presbyterian Church (USA) to break racial barriers.

In the 1960s the neighborhood was experiencing a white-to-black overhaul. While many white congregations moved somewhat slowly and reluctantly toward absorbing their black neighbors during the Civil Rights era, New Covenant was the first Miami church to be conceived and organized with the definite purpose of integration. When it was formed in 1965, the congregation adopted the motto: "A church for all people".

The church quickly swelled, boasting some 300 worshipers at its peak. Over time, what began as a multicolored mix—including a few Hispanics—remained largely integrated and harmonious, despite the McDuffie race riots and continued white flight—at least until nearly all white members had died or moved away by the 1990s.

“It was fully interracial—in the choir and in the organization”, said the Rev. Dr. "Mike" Irvin Elligan, the church’s pastor from 1970 to 1985. “There were white people who were invited to black homes for dinner and vice versa.” Elligan, an African American, had as his associate pastor, the Rev. Dr. Y. Jacqueline Rhoades, a white woman born in France. The church was truly a multi-cultural congregation.

New Covenant established the Elizabeth E. Curtis Day Care Center to serve the children of the surrounding community for many years. From 1987 to 1991, Rev. Ronald E. Peters served as pastor and during this time, the church established the Kuumba Project, a summer cultural enrichment program for neighborhood youth, ages 9 through 17 years. The congregation's social justice ministry attracted many young families throughout the city. In 1991, Dr. Peters resigned as pastor when he joined the faculty of Pittsburgh Theological Seminary.

In the 1990s the membership declined, becoming nearly all black, with one white member and a few Hispanics. Attendance had fallen to less than 40 on any given Sunday. In 1999, the pastor of the congregation retired, following a time of intense conflict. The Rev. Dr. Maynard Pittendreigh chaired an Administrative Commission composed of other pastors and elders to guide the church through a turbulent time.

The congregation is once more growing, although it remains a smaller membership church. The Reverend Connie Bright serves as the church's pastor.
