= Miami Workers Center =

The Miami Workers Center is a strategy and organizing center founded in 1999 for low-income communities and low-wage workers in the Liberty City neighborhood of Miami, Florida.

== Overview ==
Founded in March 1999, the Miami Workers Center's mission is to work to end poverty and oppression. The center works on these issues by building the power of grassroots organizations made up of and led by the people most affected by these problems and by assisting in the development of a broad-based social justice movement in South Florida.

The Center conducts its work by initiating and developing grassroots organizations; developing the strategic and technical capacity of leaders through the hands-on organizing and intensive political education; and increasing the voice, participation, and leadership of no- and low-wage workers (including the unemployed, welfare recipients, and service sector workers) and their organizations in local/national policy-making, community initiatives, and the broader social justice movement.

== Achievements ==
The Center's most significant achievement has been the initiation and development of Low Income Families Fighting Together (LIFFT), which is a grassroots membership organization of and for current and former welfare recipients, low-wage workers, and public housing residents that has become a growing force in Miami-Dade County. In these efforts the Miami Workers' Center joins arms with South Florida's low-income people to address issues of poverty and oppression within the region's most oppressed communities.

== See also ==
- Social justice
- Neoliberalism
