= Lovely One (memoir) =

2024 book by Ketanji Brown Jackson

- Author: Ketanji Brown Jackson
- Language: English
- Genre: Memoir
- Publisher: Random House
- Publication date: September 3, 2024
- Pages: 405
- ISBN: 978-0-593-72990-8
- OCLC: 1452735147

Lovely One is the 2024 memoir by U.S. Supreme Court justice Ketanji Brown Jackson. The title stems from the justice's first and middle names, Ketanji Onyika, a suggestion from her aunt who was a Peace Corps volunteer in west Africa around the time Brown Jackson was born.

Lovely One reached the top of the New York Times Bestseller List the week of September 22, 2024, despite receiving criticism for not being as sharp of writing as some of her judicial writing. Jackson was nominated for Best Audio Book, Narration, and Storytelling award at the 2026 Grammy Awards for her audiobook recording of Lovely One.

The book describes Brown Jackson's own stories, mentors, notably Justice Stephen Breyer, and role-models, including Constance Baker Motley, the first Black woman to argue a case before the US Supreme Court. It also tells the stories facing the greater Black population, such as a relative inability to swim due to their parents' lack of access to public pools and beaches or the inegalites of stop-and-search practices.
