= Calvin Ross =

American police chief (born 1949)

- Born: January 9, 1949 (age 77); Overtown, Florida, U.S.
- Education: Biscayne College
- Occupation: Police officer
- Children: 4
- Relatives: Ketanji Brown Jackson (niece)

Calvin Ross (born January 9, 1949) is an American former law enforcement officer who served as Chief of Police of the City of Miami from 1991 to 1994, then served as Secretary of Juvenile Justice of Florida, overseeing juvenile justice programs, and finally served as police chief of Florida A&M University from 2001 to 2012. As the maternal uncle of Justice Ketanji Brown Jackson, elements of his career received attention in connection with their influence on then-Judge Jackson in the process leading up to her nomination to the United States Supreme Court.

== Early life and education ==
Born in Overtown, Ross grew up in Liberty City, two of the poorest areas in Miami. He graduated from Biscayne College in Miami with a degree in criminal justice.

== Career ==
Ross worked for the Miami police department for 23 years, beginning as a patrolman and ultimately being named police chief in 1991.

In 1992, Governor Lawton Chiles appointed Ross to a state panel on contraband forfeiture practices. Ross was the only ethnic minority appointed to serve on the panel, which led to a protest from the NAACP. The governor responded by appointing two Hispanic members, but this did not alleviate dissatisfaction with the panel, given the disproportionate number of African-Americans in the juvenile justice system.

In 1994, Governor Chiles named Ross "to lead a new state agency in charge of juvenile justice programs, everything from prevention and boot camps to long-term lockup". The administration noted that in appointing Ross, Governor Chiles "wanted to signal a tougher approach to juvenile crime by selecting a career police officer".

Ross later served for 11 years as police chief at Florida A&M University.

== Personal life ==
Ross married a native Panamanian, with whom he had four children. He is a born-again Christian.
