= Penn State School of International Affairs =

International relations school of Pennsylvania State University

Coordinates: 40.80742°N 77.86645°W

School of International Affairs
- Established: July 1, 2007
- Dean: Victor Romero (interim)
- Director: Mitchell Smith
- Location: University Park, Pennsylvania, U.S.
- Campus: Rural
- Website: http://sia.psu.edu/

The School of International Affairs of Pennsylvania State University was officially launched on July 1, 2007, having been approved by Pennsylvania State University's (Penn State) Board of Trustees in January 2007. The school is administratively part of Penn State Law in University Park, Pennsylvania. It draws extensively upon the intellectual resources of faculty in several academic colleges of the University. The School of International Affairs offers a professional master's degree in international affairs with several specialty concentrations.

== Faculty and administration ==
The School operates under the guidance of Director Mitchell Smith, and a faculty governing council composed of leading faculty from some of Penn State's top graduate departments.

Faculty members have included former diplomats, a Navy Vice Admiral, National Security Council staff, a senior official of both the African Union and the United Nations, an economic development agency director, former CIA officials, a State Department senior counselor, a U.S. Geological Survey chief scientist, and international and arbitration experts and top scholars who contribute to public discourse. Together they represent scholars and practitioners in their respective disciplines.

SIA students also learn from faculty from throughout Penn State, including the Smeal College of Business, College of Engineering, College of Earth and Mineral Sciences, College of Agricultural Science, and the Eberly College of Science. The combination of these schools allows SIA to offer programs in interdisciplinary range and flexibility.

The school is a full member of the Association of Professional Schools of International Affairs (APSIA), a group of schools of public policy, public administration, and international studies.
