= Mount Chauve =

Mountain in Antarctica

Mount Chauve (66°49′S 141°23′E) is a rocky hill, 33 metres (110 ft) high, at the northwestern extremity of Cape Margerie. It was charted and named by the French Antarctic Expedition in 1950. The name is descriptive of the hill's denuded aspect, evoking the celebrated musical score Night on Bald Mountain, "chauve" being a French word for bald.
