= Penn State Law Review =

- Discipline: Law review
- Language: English
- Edited by: Peyton C. Cate (2025-2026)

Publication details
- Former names: The Forum; The Dickinson Law Review
- History: 1897 to present
- Publisher: Penn State Law (United States)
- Frequency: Triannual

Standard abbreviations
- Bluebook: Penn St. L. Rev.
- ISO 4: Penn State Law Rev.

Indexing
- ISSN: 1545-7877

Links
- Journal homepage; Online access

The Penn State Law Review is a law review and the flagship legal publication of Penn State Law. Its origins trace back to 1897 as The Forum, later renamed the Dickinson Law Review while affiliated with the Dickinson Law School, making it one of the oldest legal periodicals in the United States. When the Dickinson Law School merged with Penn State University in 2003, the name of the periodical was changed to the Penn State Law Review. Following the separation of the Penn State Law and Penn State Dickinson Law campuses into separately-accredited law schools in 2016, each school maintained separate law reviews; the name Dickinson Law Review was readopted by its respective law school, while the name Penn State Law Review was retained by Penn State Law.

The Penn State Law Review is one of three legal periodicals published by Penn State Law and one of the oldest law journals in the United States. The two other Penn State Law journals are Penn State Journal of Law and International Affairs and Penn State Law Arbitration Law Review. The Penn State Law Review is a general-interest journal that is run entirely by students, publishing a broad range of legal scholarship without limiting submissions to any specific topic. The journal publishes three times annually, with each issue including legal articles written by scholars and professionals, and comments written by Penn State Law students. Every year, as part of a stringent selection process, the journal evaluates a host of article submissions from outside scholars and comments written by second-year associate editors; articles and comments meeting the standards of the editorial board are selected and published in the print edition of the Law Review.

== Admissions ==
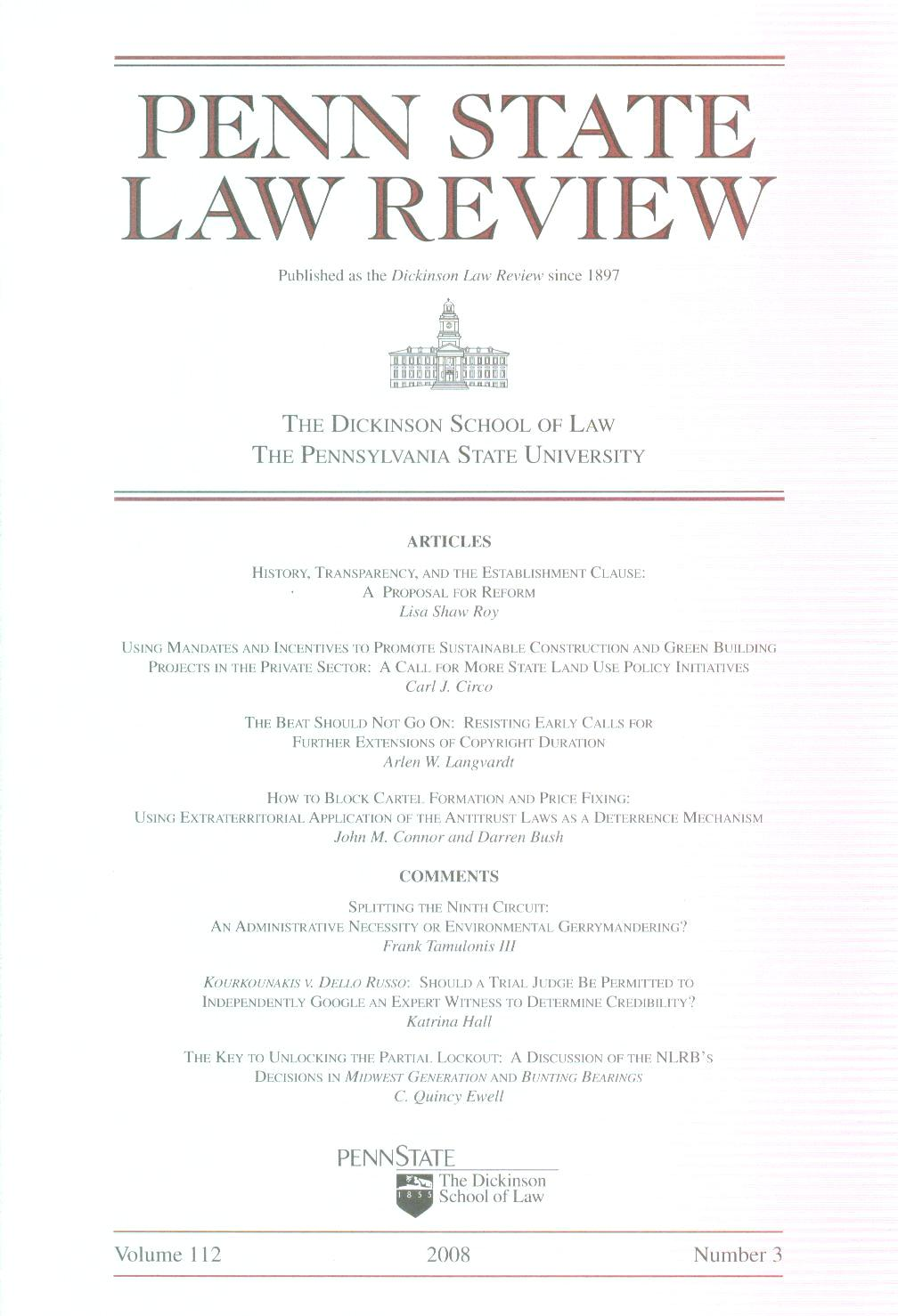
An issue of the Penn State Law Review

The Penn State Law Review extends annual membership invitations to rising second-year students at the conclusion of the spring semester. Of the available membership invitations, one-half are based upon grades and the other half are based upon evaluations of the write-on competition, which commences during the summer.

== Associate editors ==
Selected second-year law students participate as associate editors of the Law Review. Duties of the associate editors include checking sources cited in the articles pending publication to ensure accuracy and compliance with the most recent edition of the Bluebook and Law Review local rules. The associate editors are also required to produce a legal comment of publishable quality on a topic of their choosing. Once complete, the student-written comments are reviewed and graded by the Law Review comments editors, with the top scored comments selected for publication in the journal.

== Editorial board ==
The Penn State Law Review is managed by an editorial board. Following successful completion of their duties as associate editors, second-year law review members may choose to run for a position on the Law Review's editorial board, assuming their roles in their third years. The Penn State Law Review editorial board presently consists of the following positions: editor-in-chief, managing editor, executive articles editor, executive comments editor, articles editors, comments editors, research editor, and online editor. The editorial board comprises the managing body of the journal, and day-to-day law review operations are carried out by the efforts of the editorial board. Third-year non-editorial board members serve as senior editors and act, in part, as advisers to the associate editors and assistants to the editorial board members.

== Online companion ==
Penn State Law Review also publishes an online companion called Penn Statim. Penn Statim contains the Law Review's printed content in electronic format, as well as exclusive online scholarship submitted by academics, professionals, and law students on various topics concerning the law. The online companion also houses The Forum Blog, a less formal platform for Penn State Law students and others to write short blog posts on contemporary legal issues of interest.
