= Liberty Square (Miami) =

Public housing apartment complex in Miami, Florida, United States

- Aerial view toward the southeast of the original 243-unit complex, circa 1937
- Interactive map of Liberty Square

General information
- Location: Liberty City, Miami
- Coordinates: 25°50′10″N 80°13′12″W
- Status: Open

Construction
- Constructed: 1934–37

Other information
- Governing body: Miami-Dade Public Housing Agency

Liberty Square, often referred to as the Pork & Beans, was a 753-unit public housing project in the Liberty City neighborhood of Miami, Florida. It is bordered at Martin Luther King Jr. Boulevard/North 62nd Street to the south, North 67th Street to the north, State Road 933 (Northwest 12th Avenue) to the east, and Northwest 15th Avenue to the west. Constructed as a part of the New Deal by the Public Works Administration and opening in 1937, it was the first public housing project for African Americans in the Southern United States. It is featured in the 2023 documentary film, Razing Liberty Square.

== History ==
As development flourished in South Florida from the early 20th century through the 1920s, restrictive covenants and Jim Crow laws barred black Americans in the Miami area from living in much of the area outside of Overtown. Overtown, then called Colored Town, grew to be one of the most densely populated areas in South Florida. Several city blocks of Overtown homes were dilapidated shotgun houses with no electricity or access to municipal water and sewer, being host to a relatively high incidence of infectious diseases in many areas. Community organizings and advocacy by respected black businessmen and clergy, such as the works of undertaker Kelsey L. Pharr and Rev. John E. Culmer, informed the creation of the Southern Housing Corporation (SHC). Formed by seven white Miami-area attorneys and led by former state attorney John C. Gramling, the SHC garnered public support for the endeavor from Miami residents. It then lobbied the new administration of President Franklin D. Roosevelt in the first 100 days for the creation of a new "negro colony" on what was-then the outskirts of the city to alleviate blight and to largely displace blacks from Overtown to spur further private real estate development in Downtown Miami.

The new facility opened 243 single-family units opened to tenants February 6, 1937. Built just west of the north Miami neighborhoods of Buena Vista and Lemon City, opposition to the proximity of the new apartments to the mostly white communities led to the erection of a 4-foot-tall (1.2 m) wall along West 12th Avenue from North 62nd Street north to 71st Street, most of which was torn down since the 1950s. Construction of I-95 and I-395/State Road 836 (then, the North-South and East-West Expressways, respectively) purged thousands of African Americans from Overtown into other black area communities like the burgeoning Liberty Square and surrounding Liberty City area.

Until the de facto racial segregation in public accommodations and private homeownership practices ended after the enactment of the Civil Rights Acts of 1964 and 1968, Liberty Square became the most densely populated subdivision in the Miami area. Once a largely middle income community, a purge of poor elderly and several welfare-dependent single mother families from Overtown fled to Liberty Square, leading to a black flight of middle and higher-income African Americans to suburban Miami-Dade county and a decline in living standards in the project between the 1960s and the 1980s. Liberty Square and surrounding area were the location of notable Miami area race riots in the years following the Civil Rights Movement.

== Crime and Redevelopment ==
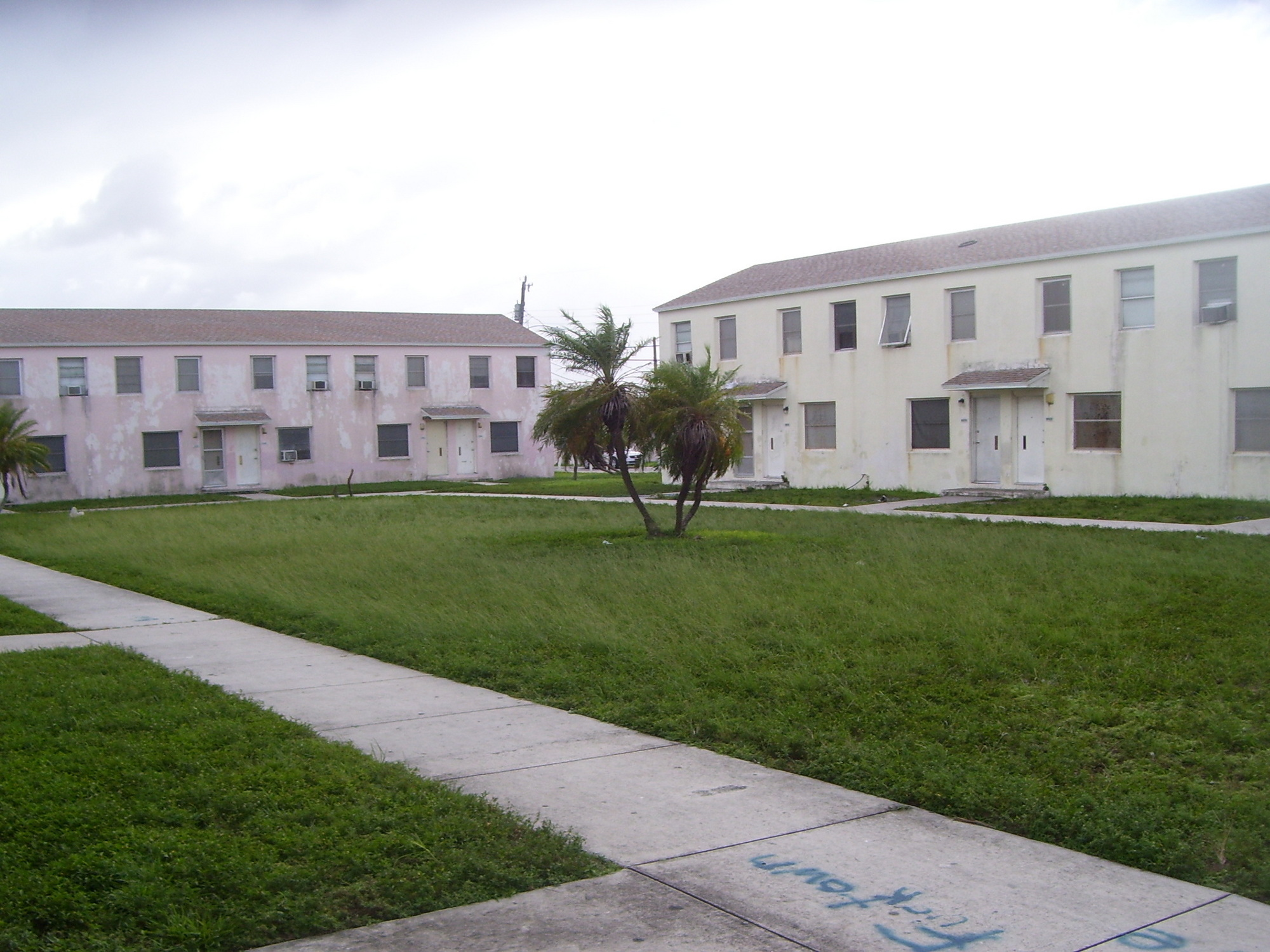
Liberty Square in 2008

When crack cocaine arrived in the early-1980s, the crime in Liberty Square increased significantly. By the mid-1980s, the Liberty Square Projects were plagued by problems such as neglect by the housing authority, heavy gang violence, shootings, drug abuse and drug dealing. It became the city’s most dangerous projects and was documented to be one of the deadliest projects in the United States. The projects experienced exceptionally high levels of homicides giving Liberty Square one of the highest murder rates among public-housing in the state of Florida and the United States. It was featured on numerous of episodes on the A&E television show The First 48.

In late January 2015, the Miami-Dade County Department of Public Housing and Community Development announced plans for construction of a "New Liberty Square." Miami-Dade County Mayor Carlos A. Giménez released a statement saying, "the plan promises to create 2,290 jobs and $285 million in economic output.” Funding for the mixed-use, mixed income public housing complex that will be “the largest renovation, revitalization of a public housing complex in county history” will come from a combination of county, state and federal resources. Local funding for the project, known as “Liberty City Rising,” is expected to be paid through General Obligation Bonds ($32 million); Document Taxes ($6 million); and Capital Fund Financing Program ($8 million). Six developers submitted proposals in response to the county's request: RUDG, an affiliate of The Related Companies, South Florida’s largest condo developer; Atlantic Pacific Communities; Carrfour Supportive Housing, Florida's largest nonprofit provider of affordable housing, mostly to the homeless; Centennial Management Corp., owner of 13 rental communities in Florida; a joint venture of Virginia-based Community Housing Partners Corp and Miami Waymark 2.0 Joint Venture LLC; and Miami Redevelopment Partners LLC.

The director of the county’s housing agency said redevelopment will not displace the more than 600 residents currently living in Liberty Square, claiming New Liberty Square will be built in phases so residents won’t move out until new units are finished. "One of our guiding principles is that all residents in good standing will have a unit to return to," he said. "If you’re a resident and you follow the terms of your lease, you’re in good standing."

The announcement has not been met with unanimous support, especially from those who have seen previous redevelopment plans contribute little to Miami’s most distressed neighborhoods. One source said that Miami-Dade County Mayor Carlos A. Giménez "was well into his first term as a county commissioner when the Department of Housing and Urban Development had to take over the county's public housing agency because of the rampant scandals ...The only way Giménez can sell this plan is by allowing trusted community leaders, not the paid-off pastors or political cronies, to have oversight on the project."

== See also ==
- Overtown
- Public housing in the United States
- Razing Liberty Square
