= Darlyne Chauve =

American painter

Darlyne Chauve is an artist working with paint (especially known for her large works), photography, and video installations. Has a studio, Warehouse NOW, at 745 NW 54 Street in the Liberty City neighborhood of Miami, FL. Also works part of the year in a studio in Mandelieu-la-Napoule, France. Has held exhibitions in the U.S. and France, and has commissioned many works for restaurants, corporations, and private citizens. Darlyne Chauve has taken a part in Miami's Art Basil in the past and is slated to take part in the 2006 Miami Art Basel as well.
