= La Saguesera =

Neighborhood in Miami, Florida

La Saguesera is a neighborhood in southwestern Miami that is home to many Cuban and other immigrant communities. This neighborhood has significantly influenced the economy, politics, and demographics of both the Cuban community and other immigrant groups in Miami since the 1960s. The name "Saguesera" reflects its large Hispanic population, as it is a Spanglish adaptation of the word "Southwest". This Spanish-English word was created by Cubans in Miami, who struggled to pronounce "Southwest" and instead pronounced it "sagues".

Geographically, La Saguesera covers the southwest area of Miami, with the southern boundary being S.W. 8th Street, the northern boundary being Flagler Street, the western boundary being S.W. 27th Avenue, and the eastern boundary being S.W. 4th Avenue. Cubans make up the primary population of this area, and it is abundant in Cuban culture, food, and businesses. The neighborhood of "La Saguesera" is often associated with the famous Calle Ocho (8th Street) and its surroundings, as well as Little Havana. The Saguesera is considered historically significant as one of the city's original Cuban communities.

== Historical background ==
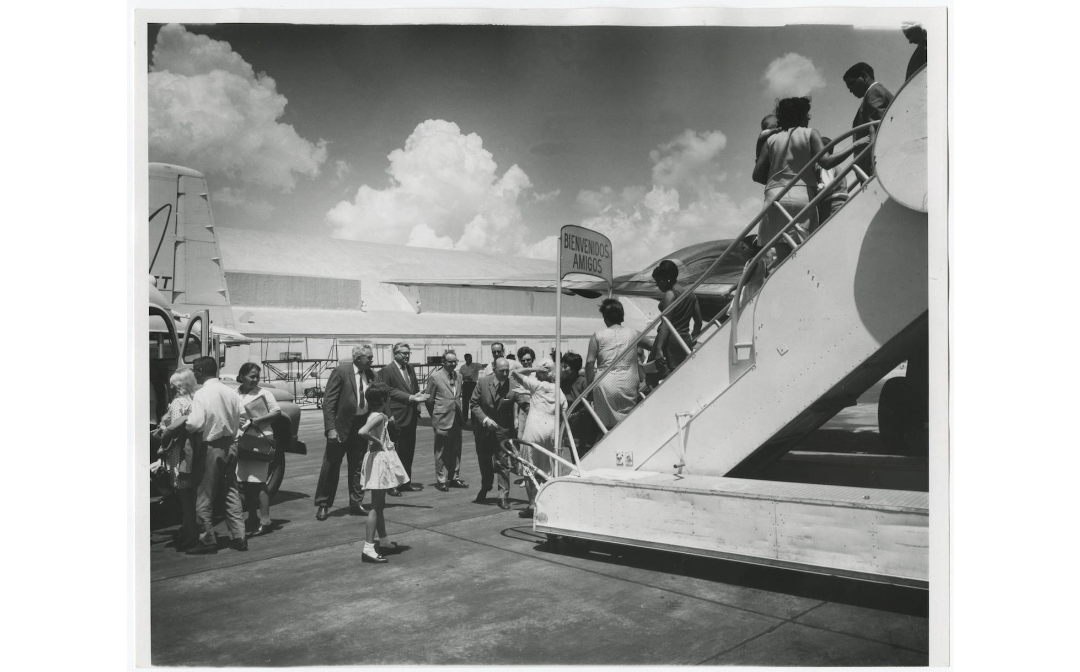
Cuban immigrants welcomed to Miami from a Freedom Flight

"La Saguesera" traces its origins to the large influx of Cuban immigrants to Miami in the 1960s following the Cuban Revolution. In the early years, Cuban immigrants settled in Miami's Southwest region due to affordable rents and easy access to public transportation, making it an ideal location for establishing a community.

=== Freedom Flights (1965–1973) ===
From the 1960s into the early 1970s, thousands of Cubans arrived in Miami, particularly during the Freedom Flights, which brought approximately 270,000 more immigrants from Cuba to Miami. This period marked a rare moment of cooperation between the United States and Cuba, during which both countries agreed that the United States would finance flights for Cubans with relatives in the United States to reunite with their families. These flights operated twice daily, five days a week. As Cuban immigrants arrived and adapted to their new country, "La Saguesera" simultaneously became their new home and a self-sustaining community, with businesses and community organizations playing a central role.

In the late 1970s, a fire damaged many of the structures in La Saguesera. Some of the original buildings are still standing, with facades covering the damage.

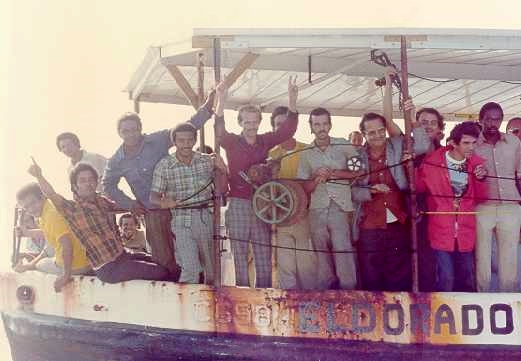
Cuban refugees arrive in Florida during the 1980 Mariel Boatlift.

=== Mariel boatlift (1980) ===
The neighborhood also witnessed the emergence of new immigrants after the arrival of the Mariel boatlift in 1980. As many as 125,000 Marielitos arrived in Florida and settled in La Saguesera. However, the arrival of Cuban immigrants from the Mariel Boatlift was not embraced as quickly as that of those who entered the country on the Freedom Flights. Many of the established Cuban residents looked down on the newcomers due to their lower socioeconomic class and their reputation as criminals. As a result, the Marielitos struggled to thrive economically compared to those who had arrived before them. After the Marielitos arrived in the country, immigration from Cuba slowed. Eventually, the United States and Cuba entered into an agreement allowing 20,000 Cubans to enter the United States each year, with priority given to asylum seekers.

== Economy ==
=== Business in La Saguesera ===
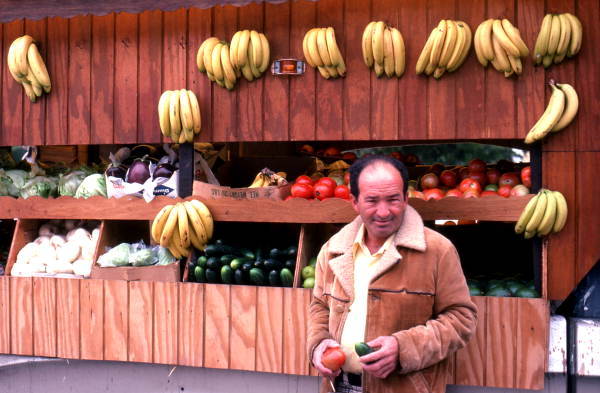
Fruit and vegetable stand

In the early years following the Cuban Revolution, Cuban immigrants sought affordable housing and employment opportunities in southwest Miami, particularly along West Flagler Street. This area became known as "La Saguesera" and became the hub of Cuban commercial life, where Cuban-owned businesses operated in the neighborhood. Many of these businesses were small, family-run establishments, such as cafeterias offering Cuban coffee and Cuban food, fruit and vegetable markets, barbershops, butchers, ice cream shops, music stores, and bakeries. The neighborhood was also home to the first of the ventanitas, coffee windows which have become a staple of south Miami.

The stream of incoming Cuban immigrants in the 1960s and early 1970s also led to the establishment of community support structures, such as the Centro Hispano Católico and the Cuban Refugee Center, which provided vital assistance, including food and job placement. These institutions helped facilitate the community's growth and success, as Cubans established businesses, schools, churches, and other organizations. By 1970, the majority of Cuban immigrants in La Saguesera still held unskilled labor jobs, with 14.1% working as technical managers and professionals, 23.8% in sales or clerical positions, 43.8% in unskilled labor positions, and only 3.57% in skilled labor fields.

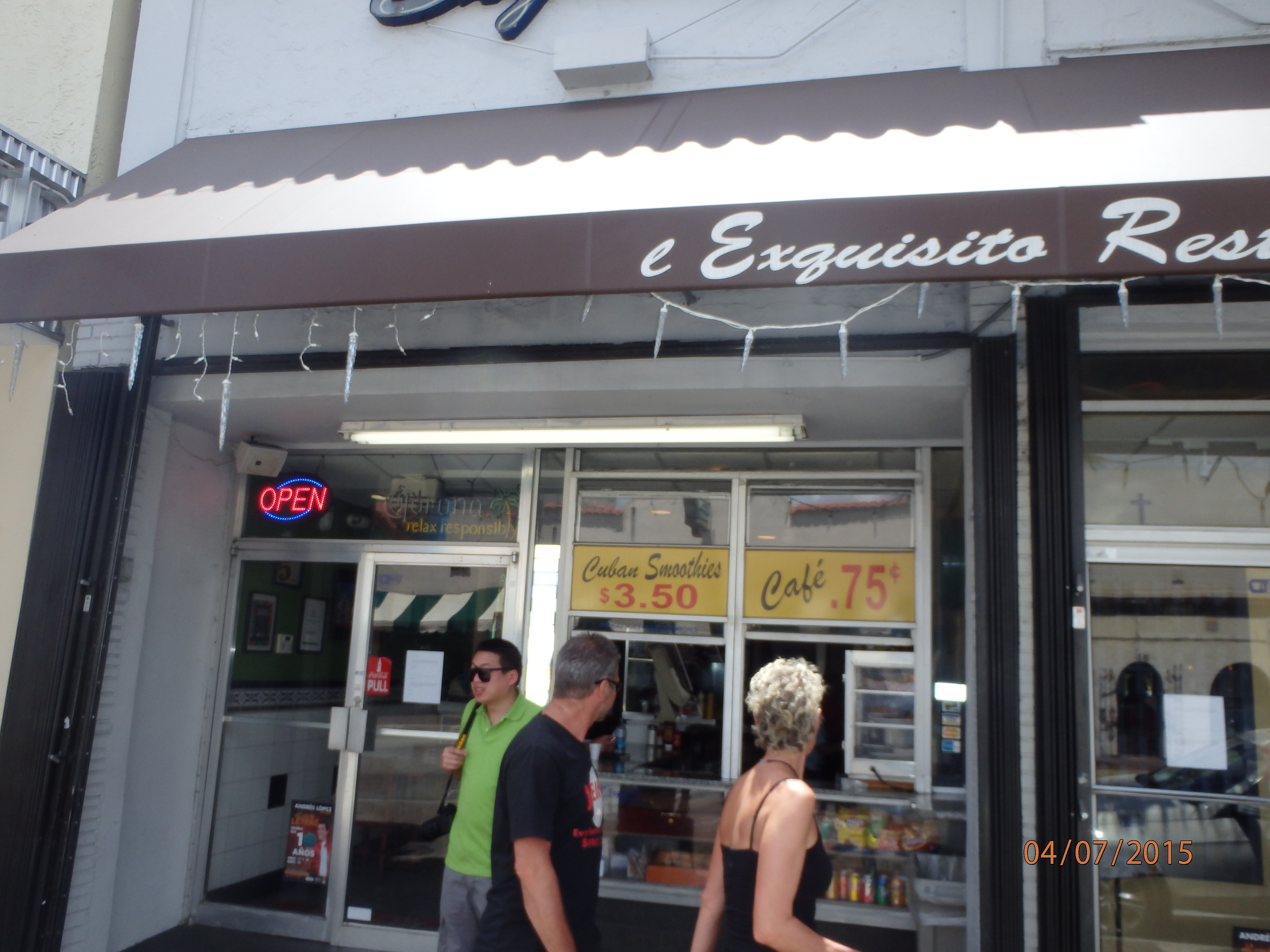
Cuban-American-owned cafe in Miami

Although many Cubans worked in unskilled labor, the economy in La Saguesera became extremely successful by the mid-1970s. The local community experienced significant economic growth as many Cubans in the area became business owners. There were around 8,000 businesses in total, including banks, construction firms, and factories. Some of these businesses took on iconic status locally, including Firestone, La Tijera, and San Bernardo. In addition to their local businesses, Cuban restaurants and nightclubs boosted the economy in the area by attracting tourists seeking a Latin atmosphere. Cuban-owned businesses continued to open across the county, contributing to a lower unemployment rate and a relatively high income level for many Cuban families.

== Politics and representation ==
During the 1960s–70s, Cuban exiles played an increasing role in American politics as many became citizens (at a rate of about 1,000 per month), and 80% of these new citizens registered to vote. Miami's Cuban-American community became a major voting bloc as they came to constitute one-third of Miami-Dade County's population. In 1973, Manolo Reboso won a seat on the city commission and became the first Cuban elected official in Miami-Dade County.

== Demographic evolution ==
Before the arrival of Cuban immigrants, the neighborhood was primarily populated by Jews and Southerners.

From the 1970s to the 2000s, the Cuban population in Miami experienced a significant shift in both concentration and distribution. In 1970, La Saguesera was a prominent Cuban immigrant neighborhood, with Cubans making up 65% of the population and 86% of Spanish speakers.

By 1980, Cubans began to spread westward, with the highest concentration shifting west of 17th Avenue. This westward trend continued into the 1990s and 2000s, with the western part of the neighborhood known as Little Havana maintaining the largest Cuban population, while other areas experienced a decline. Overall, while the total Cuban population grew, their percentage within the neighborhood steadily decreased, indicating a demographic shift and the growth of other Hispanic groups.

In the late 20th century, new immigrants from countries like Colombia, Venezuela, and Central America arrived in La Saguesera. While wealthier Latin Americans moved to more prosperous neighborhoods, many of the new arrivals were working-class individuals seeking better opportunities. One of the prominent new groups of inhabitants in the area was Nicaraguan immigrants who were escaping the Sandinista regime during the 1970s and 1980s. At the end of the 1980s, 68,000 Nicaraguan immigrants had moved into Miami-Dade County. In 2022, Nicaraguans comprised 30% of residents of La Saguesera.

In the early 2000s, the Latino population continued to grow, with Cubans remaining the majority but increasingly outnumbered by immigrants from other nationalities. These new immigrants often worked low-wage jobs and faced economic challenges. However, like previous immigrants, they worked hard to improve their lives, marking a new phase in La Saguesera.

== La Saguesera today ==
As of 2022, the area continues to evolve. Since the initial arrival of Cuban immigrants, the neighborhood has seen an increase in immigrant groups from other Latin American countries, such as Honduras, Guatemala, and El Salvador, contributing to its diverse character. However, while the number of Central and South American immigrants has increased, many Cubans have since migrated to the iconic Calle Ocho and other areas in Little Havana due to its abundance of residential areas and single-family homes. Despite the changes La Saguesera has experienced over the years, the location continues to offer cheap rent and ample job opportunities for those seeking to build a new life in the area.

== In popular culture ==
Cuban culture was and is abundant in La Saguesera, where Cuban immigrants showcased their musical talents through songwriting. Gustavo Perez's "Flagler Street" describes La Saguesera as a replacement for the old streets of Havana, Cuba, even as he continued to yearn for his homeland.
