= Liberty City (Miami) =

Neighbourhood in Miami, Florida, U.S.

Coordinates: 25.831801°N 80.224829°W

- Neighborhood of Miami
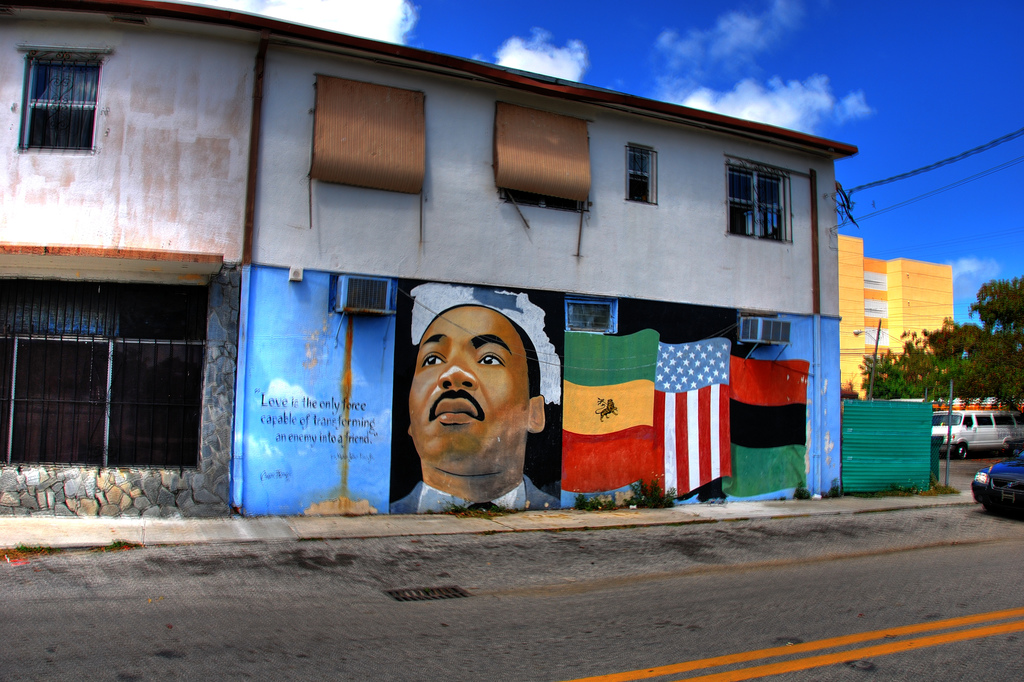
- Liberty City mural
- Nickname: Model City (historic name)
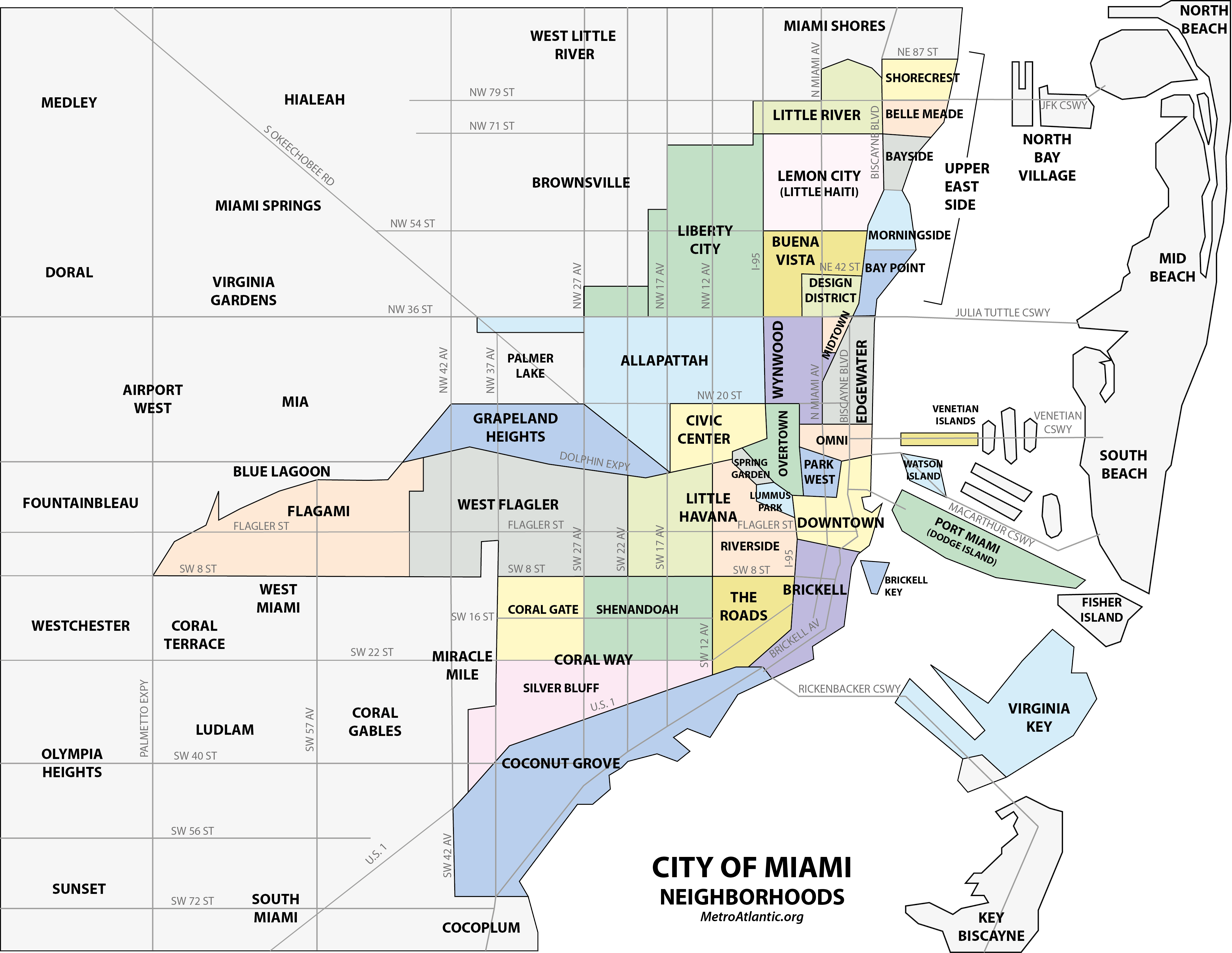
- The Liberty City neighborhood in Miami
- Country: United States
- State: Florida
- County: Miami-Dade County
- City: Miami

Government
  - City of Miami Commissioner: Jeffrey Watson
  - Miami-Dade Commissioners: Keon Hardemon
  - House of Representatives: Ashley Gantt (D) and Dotie Joseph (D)
  - State Senate: Shevrin Jones (D)
  - U.S. House: Frederica Wilson (D)
- Elevation: 9.8 ft (3 m)

Population (2010)
  - Total: 19,725
  - Density: 9,669/sq mi (3,733/km^{2})
- Time zone: UTC-05 (EST)
- ZIP Code: 33125, 33127, 33142, 33147, 33150
- Area codes: 305, 786

Liberty City is a predominantly African American neighborhood in Miami, Florida, United States. The area is roughly bound by NW 79th Street to the north, NW 27th Avenue to the west, the Airport Expressway to the South, and Interstate 95 to the east. The neighborhood is home to one of the largest concentrations of African Americans in South Florida, as of the 2000 census. Although it was often known as "Model City" both historically and by the Miami city government, residents more commonly call it Liberty City.

It is serviced by the Miami Metrorail at Dr. Martin Luther King Jr. Plaza and Brownsville stations along NW 27th Avenue.

== History ==
Once part of the sparsely populated outskirts of northern Miami, what became Liberty City developed during the Great Depression of the 1930s when President Franklin D. Roosevelt authorized the construction of the Liberty Square housing project in 1933, the first of its kind in the Southern United States. Built as a response to the deteriorating housing conditions in densely populated and covenant-restricted slums of Overtown, construction on the initial housing project began in 1934 and it opened in 1937.

Into the 1940s and 1950s, the growing Liberty City and adjacent Brownsville thrived as a middle-income black American community, hosting several churches, hospitals, and community centers. The area served as home to prominent figures such as Kelsey Pharr, M. Athalie Range (the first black American elected to serve on the Miami city commission) and boxer Muhammad Ali. Although segregation laws prohibited black Americans from resting and residing in popular Miami Beach, service establishment and resorts such as the Hampton House Motel and Villas catered to and entertained the likes of notables such as Martin Luther King Jr., Althea Gibson, and even whites such as Mickey Mantle.

Construction of Interstate 95 in Florida in Overtown and declining use of restrictive covenants in the wake of the Civil Rights Act of 1964 dramatically altered the neighborhood into the 1960s. Increasing numbers of lower-income elderly and welfare-dependent families migrated to Liberty City after their displacement primarily from inner city Overtown, turning the area into a dangerous ghetto, leading to large-scale black flight of middle- and higher-income blacks and other blacks like West Indian Americans largely to suburban areas like Florida City and Miami Gardens in southern and northern Dade County, respectively.

Crime grew prevalent in the increasingly poverty-stricken area in the immediate post–civil rights movement era of the 1960s and 1970s. By 1968, Liberty City, with a population of 45,000, was Miami's largest and most congested area. Years of social disruption created an unstable climate that needed just a spark to ignite. The ensuing problems of the poor and disenfranchised grew most apparent and notable in race riots that occurred in Liberty City in August 1968 during the Republican National Convention in Miami Beach and in May 1980 following the acquittal of police officers charged with the killing of Arthur McDuffie.

The plight of inner-city black Miamians increasingly came to be highlighted in national press into the 1980s as the University of Miami Hurricanes football team won several national college football championships led by players recruited mostly from black, lower-income neighborhoods such as Liberty City and Overtown. National exposure continued with the popularity of nationally broadcast programs such as the NBC crime drama Miami Vice, which brought the deteriorating conditions of the area to greater prominence.

Into the 1990s and 2000s, music grew to reflect the area, with locals such as Luther Campbell of 2 Live Crew pioneering the Miami bass genre, which dominated Southern hip hop during the decade. Other music and sports talents rose to national prominence from the area such as rappers Trina and Trick Daddy, NBA player Udonis Haslem and NFL players Chad "Ocho Cinco" Johnson, Antonio Brown, and Willis McGahee.

== Gentrification ==
Climate change is affecting the value of flood-prone real estate in Miami. Miami neighborhoods with higher elevations such as Liberty City are experiencing increasing real estate values. By 2017, Liberty City, along with Little Haiti, started becoming more attractive to investors. A community land trust is planned to maintain affordability for current residents. Home prices appreciated more slowly in 2018 in Miami Beach and lower-elevation areas of Miami-Dade County.

== Demographics ==
In 2000, Liberty City had a population of 23,009 and 43,054 residents, with 7,772 households, and 5,428 families residing in the neighborhood. The median household income was $18,809.87. The racial makeup of the neighborhood was 94.69% Black, 3.04% Hispanic or Latino of any nationality, 1.68% Other races (non-Hispanic), and 0.59% White.

The zip codes for the Liberty City include 33127, 33142, 33147, and 33150. The area covers 5.968 square miles (15.46 km^{2}). In 2000, there were 19,286 males and 23,768 females. The median age for males was 25.9 years, while the median age for females was 30.3 years. The average household size had 3.1 people, while the average family size had 3.7 members. The percentage of married-couple families (among all households) was 20.3%, while the percentage of married-couple families with children (among all households) was 9.1%, and the percentage of single-mother households (among all households) was 33.1%. The percentage of never-married males 15 years old and over was 21.9%, while the percentage of never-married females 15 years old and over was 29.7%.

In 2000, 2.7% of the population spoke little to no English. The percentage of residents born in Florida was 74.5%, the percentage of people born in another U.S. state was 16.7%, and the percentage of native residents but born outside the U.S. was 0.8%, while the percentage of foreign born residents was 7.9%.

== Education ==
Miami-Dade County Public Schools operates area public schools:

=== Elementary schools ===
- Lillie C. Evans K-8 Center
- Poinciana Park Elementary School
- Liberty City Elementary School
- Holmes Elementary School
- Charles R. Drew K-8 Center
- Agenoria S. Paschal/Olinda Elementary School
- Orchard Villa Elementary School
- Lenora Braynon Smith Elementary School
- Kelsey L. Pharr Elementary School
- Earlington Heights Elementary School
- Shadowlawn Elementary School
- Thena B. Crowder Elementary School

=== Middle schools ===
- Brownsville Middle School
- Charles R. Drew K-8 Center
- Lillie C. Evans K-8 Center
- Georgia Jones Ayers Middle School
- Jose De Diego Middle School
- Miami Springs Middle School

=== High schools ===
- Miami Northwestern Senior High School
- Miami Central Senior High School

=== Colleges ===
- Miami Dade College

=== Libraries ===
Miami-Dade Public Library operates area public libraries:

- Model City Library

== Transportation ==
The Miami Metrorail services the neighborhood at the following stations:

- Earlington Heights (Airport Expressway and West 22nd Avenue)
- Brownsville (North 52nd Street and West 27th Avenue)
- Dr. Martin Luther King Jr. Plaza (North 62nd Street/Martin Luther King Jr. Blvd and West 27th Avenue)

== Notable people ==
- DJ Uncle Al
- Teddy Bridgewater, NFL quarterback
- Antonio Brown, NFL wide receiver
- Leslie C. Brown, motivational speaker
- Artie Burns, NFL cornerback for the Pittsburgh Steelers
- Luther Campbell
- Rakeem Cato, CFL quarterback
- Darlyne Chauve
- Amari Cooper, NFL wide receiver for the Cleveland Browns
- Elvis Dumervil, linebacker for the Baltimore Ravens of the NFL
- Wilkie D. Ferguson
- Marcus Forston
- Devonta Freeman, NFL Running back Atlanta Falcons
- JT, member of American rap duo City Girls
- Jacki-O
- Jacory Harris
- Udonis Haslem
- T. Y. Hilton, NFL wide receiver for the Indianapolis Colts
- Bershawn Jackson
- Barry Jenkins
- Darnell Jenkins
- Chad Johnson, NFL wide receiver
- George Jung, depicted in the movie Blow
- Ky-Mani Marley
- John Marks, mayor of Tallahassee
- Tarell Alvin McCraney, playwright
- Carrie Meek
- Montel Vontavious Porter
- M. Athalie Range
- Ian Richards
- Eli Rogers, NFL wide receiver for the Pittsburgh Steelers
- Calvin Ross, Miami police chief
- Mickey Rourke
- Sean Spence, NFL linebacker
- Trick Daddy
- Trina
- Erica Wheeler, WNBA player
- Betty Wright
- Purvis Young, visual artist

== See also ==
- Liberty City Riots
- Liberty Square
- Miami Workers Center
- Nation of Yahweh
- New Covenant Presbyterian Church of Miami
