= Penn State Law =

Law school in University Park, Pennsylvania, US

Coordinates: 40.807539°N 77.866726°W

Penn State Dickinson Law
- Parent school: Pennsylvania State University
- Established: 1834 (as The Dickinson School of Law)
- School type: Law School
- Endowment: $24.5 million
- Dean: Danielle M. Conway
- Location: Carlisle, Pennsylvania, United States
- Enrollment: 402
- Faculty: 61
- USNWR ranking: 62nd (2026)
- Website: pennstatelaw.psu.edu
- ABA profile: Standard 509 Report

Penn State Law, located in University Park, Pennsylvania, was one of two separately accredited law schools of the Pennsylvania State University. Penn State Law offers J.D., LL.M., and S.J.D. degrees. The school also offers a joint J.D./M.B.A. with the Smeal College of Business, a joint J.D./M.I.A. degree with the School of International Affairs, which is also located in the Lewis Katz Building, as well as joint degrees with other graduate programs at Penn State.

Penn State Law traces its roots to the founding of The Dickinson School of Law in Carlisle, Pennsylvania. Penn State and The Dickinson School of Law merged in 2000, and, until fall 2014, Penn State's Dickinson School of Law operated as a single law school with two campuses—one in Carlisle and one on Penn State's University Park campus in State College, Pennsylvania. The first class to attend the University Park campus was during the 2006–2007 academic year. In the summer of 2014, Penn State received approval from the American Bar Association to operate the two campuses as two separate and distinct law schools, both of which share the history of The Dickinson School of Law: Dickinson Law, in Carlisle, Pennsylvania, and Penn State Law, in University Park, Pennsylvania. In November 2022, Penn State President Neeli Bendapudi announced a task force to implement the recommendation that the two schools be merged into a single entity, with the preferred location to be at the Dickinson campus.

U.S. News & World Report, in its 2021 rankings of Best Graduate Schools, ranked Penn State Law 60th among 194 law schools fully accredited by the American Bar Association.

== Lewis Katz Building ==
Penn State Law is housed in the Lewis Katz Building on Penn State's University Park campus. The building opened for classes on January 9, 2009. The $60 million, 114,000-square foot building is the first academic facility to be built on the west side of Park Avenue on the University Park campus. The building is adjacent to the Penn State Arboretum.

The Lewis Katz Building is LEED certified and equipped with advanced high-definition digital audiovisual telecommunications capacity that enables real-time collaborative projects and programs with schools and institutions worldwide. The second floor includes the glass-enclosed library, with a two-story information commons, four group study rooms, and 11 offices. Library spaces comprise about 50 percent of the building.

In 2009, Judge D. Brooks Smith used the Lewis Katz Building's courtroom to hear an oral argument to the Third Circuit Court of Appeals. In addition to the courtroom, the Katz Building includes a 250-seat auditorium, four 75-person classrooms, several seminar rooms, and a "boardroom" facilitating electronic "face-to-face" contact with meeting participants worldwide.

The Lewis Katz Building is a shared academic space that is used by both the law school and the Graduate School of International Affairs. As such, many professors teach in both capacities.

== Curriculum ==
The J.D. program at Penn State Law is a three-year, six-semester course of study. In the first year, required courses include Civil Procedure, Constitutional Law, Contracts, Criminal Law, Criminal Procedure, Property, and Torts. In the second or third year, two courses are required: Professional Responsibility and a seminar. Students must also complete required experiential learning credits.

== Institutes, Centers and Programs ==
=== Center for Agricultural and Shale Law ===
Under the direction of Associate Dean Ross Pifer, the Center for Agricultural and Shale Law provides agricultural and shale law research and information with a specific focus on those issues of importance in Pennsylvania. Through its programs, the Center serves a wide variety of stakeholders including agricultural producers, landowners and royalty owners, business professionals, judges, attorneys, legislators, government officials, community groups, and the general public.

=== Center for the Study of Mergers & Acquisitions ===
Headed by Professor Samuel C. Thompson Jr., former director of the UCLA Center for the Study of Mergers and Acquisitions, the center examines corporate, securities, tax, antitrust, and other legal and economic issues that arise in mergers and acquisitions. An important part of the center's mission is to sponsor continuing legal education programs addressing these issues.

Penn State Law and the New York City Bar co-sponsor the Institute on Corporate, Securities, and Related Aspects of Mergers and Acquisitions. The institute, which has been co-chaired by Professor Thompson and H. Rodgin Cohen of Sullivan & Cromwell LLP for a number of years, is held at the Bar's facility in New York City. Sessions provide analyses of recent developments in this area.

=== Institute for Arbitration Law and Practice ===
Directed by Professor Thomas E. Carbonneau, The Penn State Institute of Arbitration Law and Practice promotes and encourages the development of arbitration law and practice.

=== Institute for Sports Law, Policy & Research ===
Directed by Professor Stephen Ross, the Penn State Institute for Sports Law Policy & Research is designed to:

- promote dialogue between students of sport and major industry participants
- aid scholars in policy-oriented research
- facilitate the dissemination of this research to policymakers and industry participants, and
- serve as a resource for journalists, lawyers, and others about sports and public policy

The institute is aided by an advisory board of industry leaders, sports scholars, and Penn State faculty and alumni, all dedicated to advancing the study of sports. The institute works closely with the John Curley Center for Sports and Journalism, the Center for Sports Business & Research in the Smeal College of Business, and the Departments of Kinesiology and Statistics.

=== Policy Innovation Lab of Tomorrow (PILOT lab) ===
Founded and directed by Professor Andrea M. Matwyshyn, PILOT lab is a research initiative that is part of the Penn State Law, Policy, & Engineering program – an interdisciplinary venture across Penn Law, Penn State College of Engineering, and Penn State School of International Affairs.

=== Other Penn State Law programs ===
- Arts, Sports, and Entertainment Law Clinic
- Center for Immigrants' Rights Clinic
- Civil Rights Appellate Clinic
- Entrepreneur Assistance Clinic
- Family Law Clinic
- Indigent Criminal Justice Practicum
- International Sustainable Development Projects Clinic
- Rural Economic Development Clinic
- Veteran and Servicemembers Legal Clinic
- International Justice Externship at the Hague, Netherlands
- Washington, D.C. Semester Program
- Explore Law Program (for undergraduate students)
- Study Abroad

== Law journals ==
Penn State law also features three scholarly journals, including the Penn State Law Review. In addition, the school also publishes:

- Penn State Journal of Law and International Affairs
- Arbitration Law Review (formerly The Yearbook on Arbitration and Mediation)

== Student organizations ==
Penn State Law has the following student organizations:

- ABA/Law Student Division—PBA/Young Lawyers Division
- Advocacy and Litigation Society
- Agricultural Law Society
- Alternative Dispute Resolution Society
- Alternative Spring Break Initiative
- Alumni Relations Committee
- American Association for Justice
- American Constitution Society for Law and Policy (ACS)
- Arts & Culture Legal Society
- Asian Pacific American Law Students Association (APALSA)
- Black Law Students Association
- Corpus Juris Society
- Criminal Law Society
- Environmental Law Society
- Family Law Society
- Fashion and Business Law Society
- Federalist Society
- International Law Society
- J. Reuben Clark Law Society
- Jewish Legal Society
- John Reed Inn of Phi Delta Phi
- Latinx Law Students Association
- Law and Education Alliance at Penn State
- Military Law Caucus
- Minority Law Students Association
- Muslim Legal Society
- National Lawyers Guild
- OutLaw-LGTB Legal Organization
- Attending Law School (PALS)
- The Penn State Law Blue and White Society
- Penn State International Arbitration Group (PSIAG)
- Penn State Law Benefiting THON
- Phi Alpha Delta
- Project S.T.A.F.F.
- Public Interest Law Fund
- Res Ipsa Loquitur
- Speakers Trust Fund
- Sports and Entertainment Law Society
- Student Animal Legal Defense Fund
- Student Bar Association
- Student Health Law Association
- Trial Advocacy Board
- Volunteer Income Tax Assistance Program
- Women's Law Caucus
- WorkLaw Society

The school also participates in a number of moot court competitions including the Willem C. Vis Moot Commercial Arbitration Moot Court, held each year in Vienna, Austria and the National Environmental Law Moot Court held at Pace University in White Plains, New York.

Students at Penn State Law also participate in intramural sports programs. Current intramural sports teams include basketball, bowling, flag football, floor hockey, indoor soccer, and volleyball. Several students are also members of rugby and softball teams. Each spring, the school sends a softball team to participate in the University of Virginia Law School softball tournament.

== Student Awards ==
The Woolsack Honor Society was founded in 1920 for the purpose of recognizing academic excellence. It was reestablished in 1981. Membership in the Society is extended to: 1) Students who rank in the top fifteen percent of the graduating class after 5 semesters; and 2) Students who do not qualify for membership after 5 semesters but who rank in the top 15 percent of the graduating class after six semesters.

Academic Honors are awarded as follows: cum laude to graduates who rank in the top 30 percent of the graduating class, magna cum laude to those who rank in the top 15 percent, and summa cum laude to those who rank in the top 5 percent of their class.

== Employment ==
According to Penn State's official 2019 ABA-required disclosures, 80.4% of the class of 2019 from Penn State Law obtained full-time, long-term, J.D. required or J.D.-Advantage employment 10 months after graduation.

ABA Employment Summary for 2019 Graduates
Employment Status	Percentage
Employed - Bar Passage Required	76.92%
Employed - J.D. Advantage	5.59%
Employed - Professional Position	0.70%
Employed - Non-Professional Position	0%
Employed - Law School/University Funded	0%
Employed - Undeterminable	0%
Pursuing Graduate Degree Full Time	2.80%
Employed - Start Date Deferred	2.10%
Unemployed - Not Seeking	3.50%
Unemployed - Seeking	8.39%
Employment Status Unknown	0%
Total of 143 Graduates

== Costs ==
The total cost of attendance (including tuition and related expenses) at Penn State Law for the 2018–2019 academic year is $73,964.
