= Upper East =

Upper East may refer to:

- Upper East Side, Manhattan, New York City
- Upper East Region, Ghana
- Upper Eastside, Miami, United States
