= List of neighborhoods in Miami =

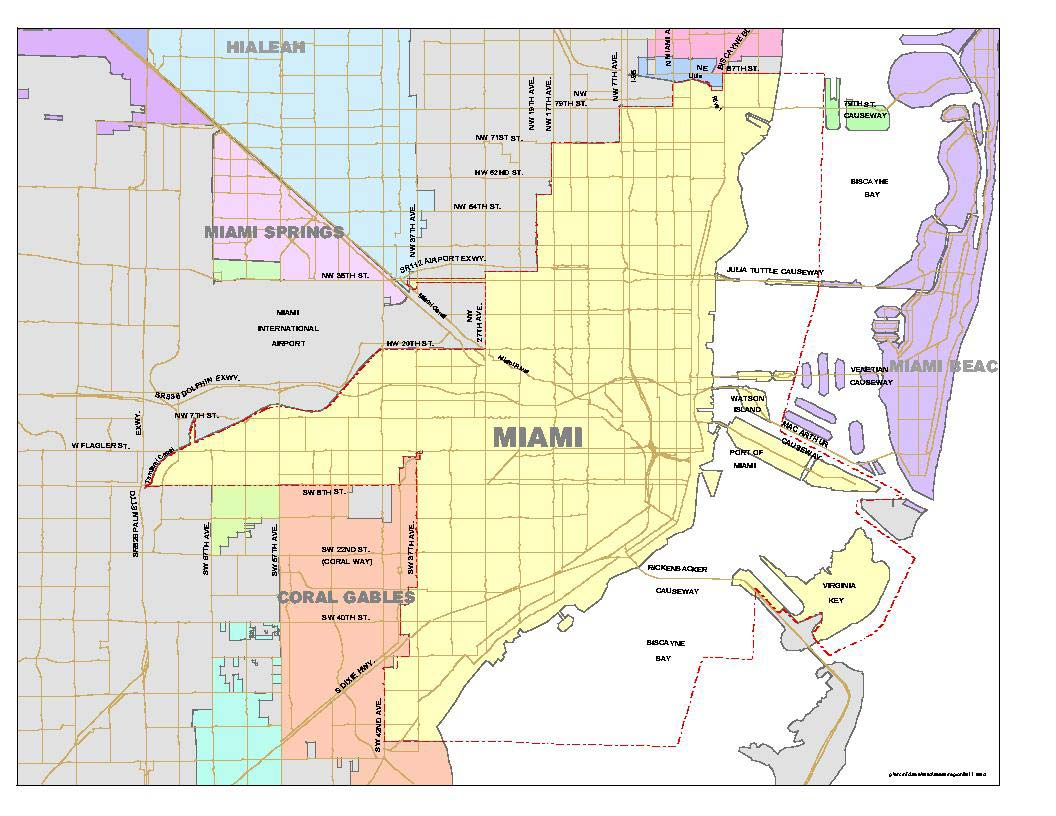
Map of the city of Miami.

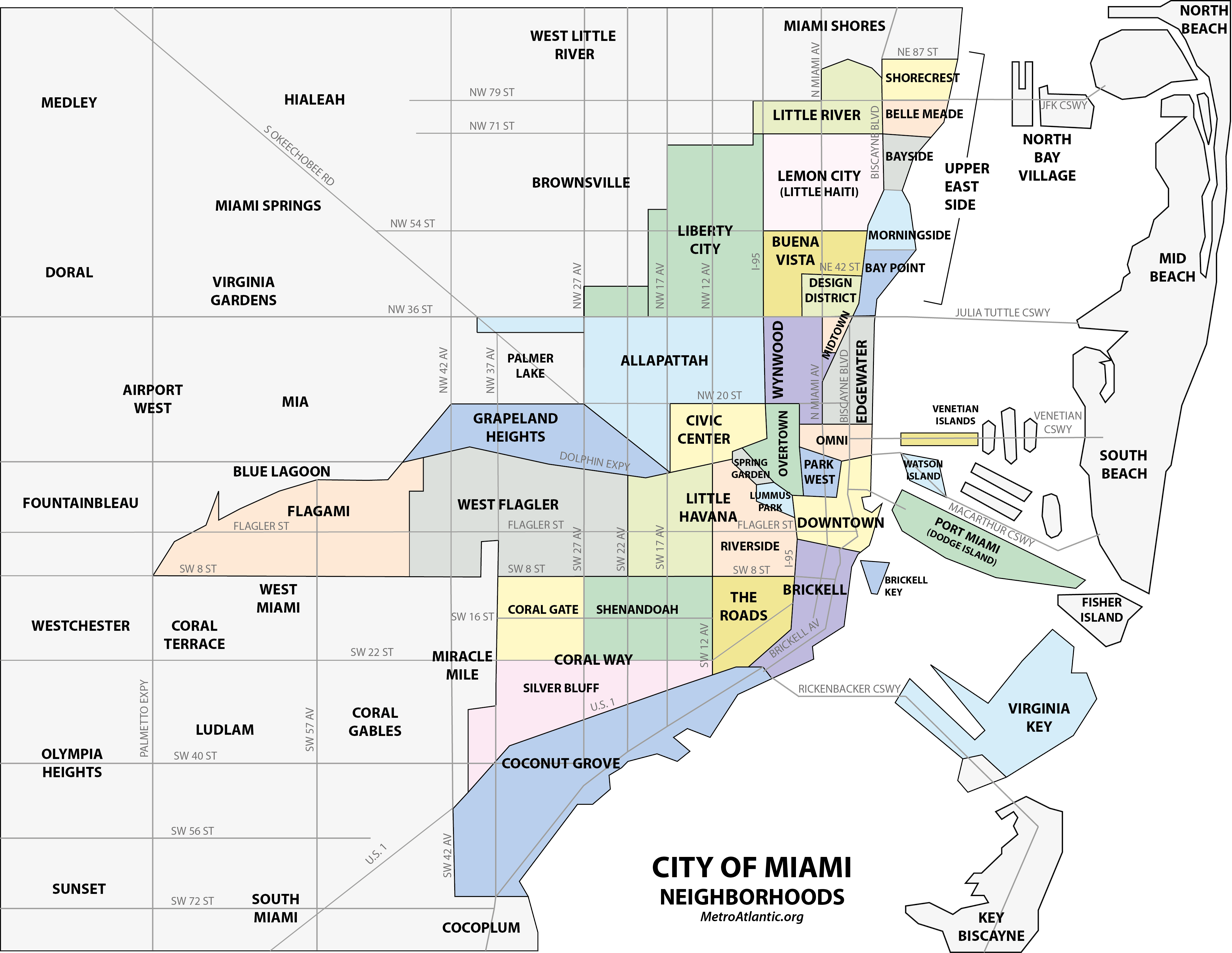
Map of Miami neighborhoods

This is a list of neighborhoods in Miami in Miami-Dade County, Florida, United States. Many of the city's neighborhoods have been renamed, redefined and changed since the city's founding in 1896. As such, the exact extents of some neighborhoods can differ from person to person. The following is the list of all the city's major neighborhoods, including any corresponding sub-neighborhoods within them.

Brickell is at the center of the Miami core. Its borders are Interstate 95 to the west, Brickell Bay to the east, the Miami River to the north, and Rickenbacker Causeway to the south. Coconut Grove is an example of a neighborhood whose size and name has stayed relatively the same since its settlement in 1825. Having been settled originally as "Cocoanut Grove", its character has stayed almost intact from its early days. In contrast, other neighborhoods have undergone many name and size changes. Buena Vista was once a much larger neighborhood in the 1920s than it is today. Buena Vista once consumed all of the Miami Design District as well as a large part of Little Haiti, Wynwood and Edgewater. Other neighborhoods, such as the Arts & Entertainment District, were previously branded as "Omni", after the Omni Mall that was located there in the 1980s and 1990s. Midtown emerged as a new neighborhood in the mid-2000s after developers created the large scale Midtown Miami development in an area traditionally known as Edgewater.

Neighborhoods in Miami
Neighborhood	Demonym	Population 2010	Population/ Km²	Sub-neighborhoods	Coordinates
Allapattah		54,289	4,401		25.815°N 80.224°W
Arts & Entertainment District		11,033	7,948		25.799°N 80.190°W
Brickell	Brickellite	31,759	14,541	None	25.758°N 80.193°W
Brickell Key					
Buena Vista		9,058	3,540	Buena Vista East Historic District	25.813°N 80.192°W
Coconut Grove	Grovite	20,076	3,091	None	25.712°N 80.257°W
Coral Way		35,062	4,496	Coral Gate, Golden Pines, Shenandoah, Historic Shenandoah, and Silver Bluff	25.750°N 80.283°W
Design District		3,573	3,623		25.813°N 80.193°W
Downtown	Downtowner	71,000 (13,635 CBD only)	10,613	Central Business District (CBD), Downtown Miami Historic District, Jewelry District, Lummus Park, Park West / Arts & Entertainment District.	25.774°N 80.193°W
Edgewater		15,005	6,675		25.802°N 80.190°W
Flagami		50,834	5,665	Alameda, Grapeland Heights, and Fairlawn	25.762°N 80.316°W
Grapeland Heights		14,004	4,130		25.792°N 80.258°W
Health District		2,705	2,148		
Liberty City		19,725	3,733		25.832°N 80.225°W
Little Haiti		29,760	3,840	Lemon City (aka Little River)	25.824°N 80.191°W
Little Havana		76,163	8,423	Calle Ocho	25.773°N 80.215°W
Lummus Park		3,027	3,680		25.777°N 80.201°W
Midtown	Midtowner	-	-	None	25.807°N 80.193°W
Overtown	Towner	6,736	3,405	Spring Garden	25.787°N 80.201°W
Riverside (Miami)				None	
The Roads		7,327	4,899	None	25.756°N 80.207°W
Upper Eastside	Upper Eastsider	12,525	2,513	Bay Point Estates, Bayside District, Belle Meade, Ironside, Magnolia Park, MiMo Historic District, Morningside, Palm Grove, and Shorecrest	25.830°N 80.183°W
Venetian Islands		N/A	N/A	Biscayne Island and San Marco Island	25.791°N 80.161°W
Virginia Key		14	-		25.736°N 80.155°W
West Flagler		31,407	4,428	None	25.775°N 80.243°W
Wynwood	Wynwooder	7,277	2,983	None	25.804°N 80.199°W
Miami	Miamian	399,457	4,687		

== See also ==
- List of communities in Miami-Dade County, Florida
