= Flagami =

- Neighborhood of Miami
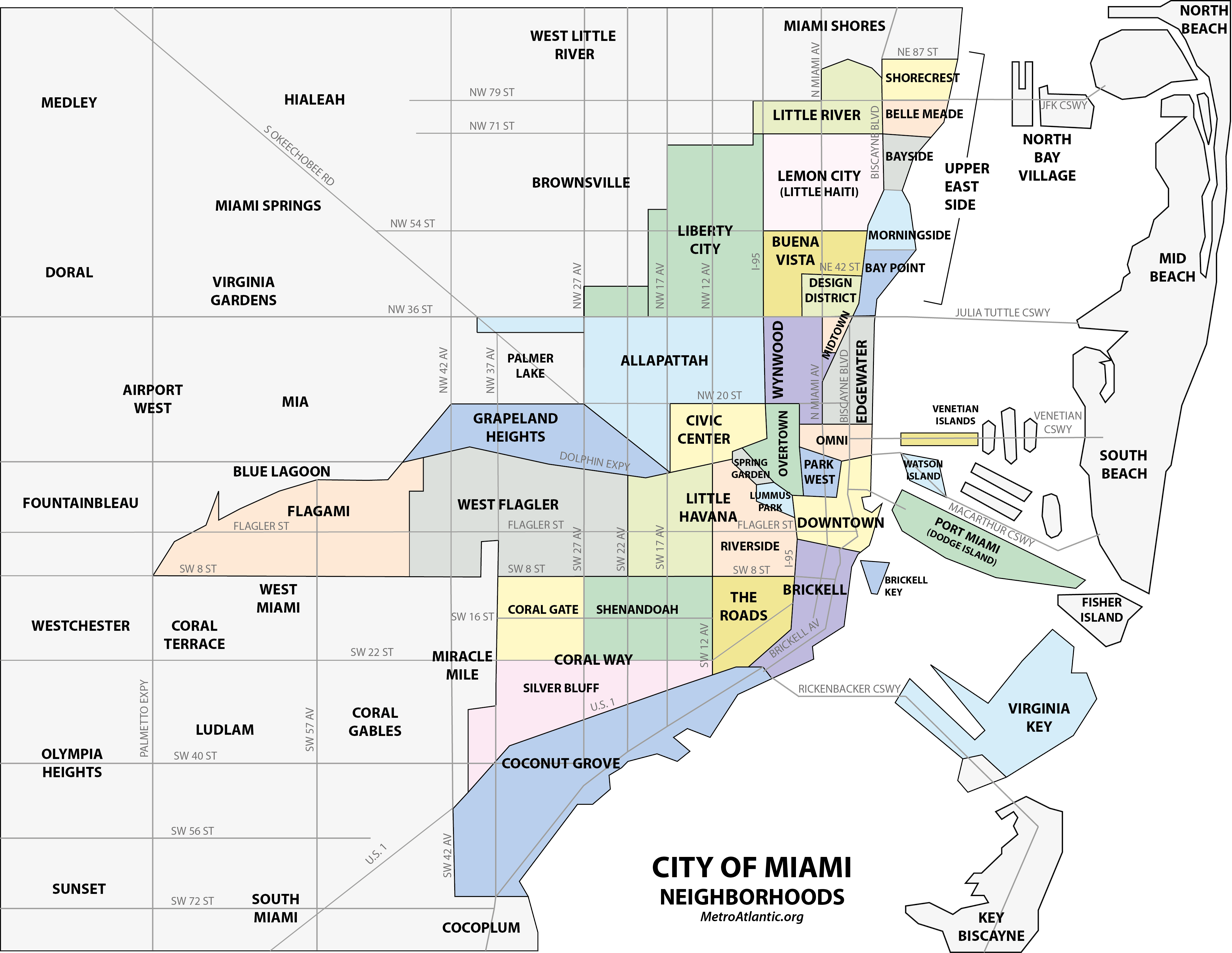
- The Flagami neighborhood in Miami
- Coordinates: 25°45′44″N 80°18′58″W
- Country: United States
- State: Florida
- County: Miami-Dade County
- City: Miami
- Subdistricts of Flagami: Neighborhoods list: Alameda; Fairlawn

Government
  - City of Miami Commissioner: Alex Diaz de la Portilla and Manolo Reyes
  - Miami-Dade Commissioners: Rebeca Sosa
  - U.S. House: Maria Elvira Salazar (R)

Population (2010)
  - Total: 50,834
  - Density: 14,670.8/sq mi (5,664.4/km^{2})
- Time zone: UTC-05 (EST)
- ZIP Code: 33125, 33126, 33128, 33130, 33135, 33144
- Area codes: 305, 786

Flagami is a neighborhood of Miami, Florida, United States, roughly defined as south and east of the Tamiami Canal, north of the Tamiami Trail (US 41/South Eighth Street), and west of Red Road (SR 959/West 57th Avenue), bisected by Flagler Street.

The name is a portmanteau of the names "Flagler" and "Tamiami." On a map of Miami proper, Flagami is the distinct "tail" that juts out of the west border of the city. 50,834 residents, mostly middle class Hispanics and some white Americans, populate the Flagami area. The residential market is a wide mix of moderately priced apartments, duplexes and single-family homes. The neighborhood is alive with many small shopping centers attracting residents, creating an atmosphere of bustling retail activity by day, while a variety of supper clubs and popular lounges attract people from all over Miami at night. It is characterized by small yet neatly kept and brightly painted single-family homes.

== Geography ==
It is located at 25.762°N 80.316°W, with an average elevation of 3 feet (0.91 m).

=== Alameda ===
Alameda is a subdivision of Flagami, located in the Flagami's western end along the Tamiami Canal. Its boundaries are roughly: north of SW 8th Street and Coral Gables, and south of NW 7th Street, roughly between 22nd and 57th Avenues. It is also sometimes referred to as West Flagler. Alameda is located at 25.763°N 80.298°W, with an elevation 10 feet (3.0 m).

=== Fairlawn ===
Fairlawn is a sub-neighborhood, within Miami's Flagami neighborhood. Its unofficial boundaries are from NW 7th Street south to SW 24th Street and from Florida Blvd west to SW 57th Avenue. It includes a large portion of the western Flagami.

== Education ==
The academic level of the Flagami area residents is as follows: 9,735 below the ninth grade level; 6,163 are non-high school graduates; 6,965 are high school graduates, and 4,802 have obtained some college education. Out of the number of citizens that have continued their studies, 1,981 have received associate degrees; 2,291 Bachelor's degrees, and 1,571 have Graduate Degrees.

Fairlawn Elementary School is located in the neighborhood.

== Demographics ==
As of 2000, Flagami had a population of 38,691 and 59,474 residents, with 13,896 households, and 10,141 families residing in the neighborhood. The median household income was $26,641.30. The racial makeup of the neighborhood was 90.08% Hispanic or Latino of any race, 1.85% Black or African American, 7.68% White (non-Hispanic), and 0.36% Other races (non-Hispanic).

The zip codes for the Flagami include 33125, 33126, and 33144. The area covers 6.378 square miles (16.52 km^{2}). As of 2000, there were 28,287 males and 31,188 females. The median age for males were 38.6 years old, while the median age for females were 44.2 years old. The average household size had 2.9 people, while the average family size had 3.2 members. The percentage of married-couple families (among all households) was 49.3%, while the percentage of married-couple families with children (among all households) was 18.6%, and the percentage of single-mother households (among all households) was 8.6%. The percentage of never-married males 15 years old and over was 13.3%, while the percentage of never-married females 15 years old and over was 10.0%.

As of 2000, the percentage of people that speak English not well or not at all made up 44.4% of the population. The percentage of residents born in Florida was 17.3%, the percentage of people born in another U.S. state was 4.7%, and the percentage of native residents but born outside the U.S. was 1.6%, while the percentage of foreign-born residents was 76.4%.
