= Grapeland Heights =

- Neighborhood of Miami
- Nickname: Grapeland
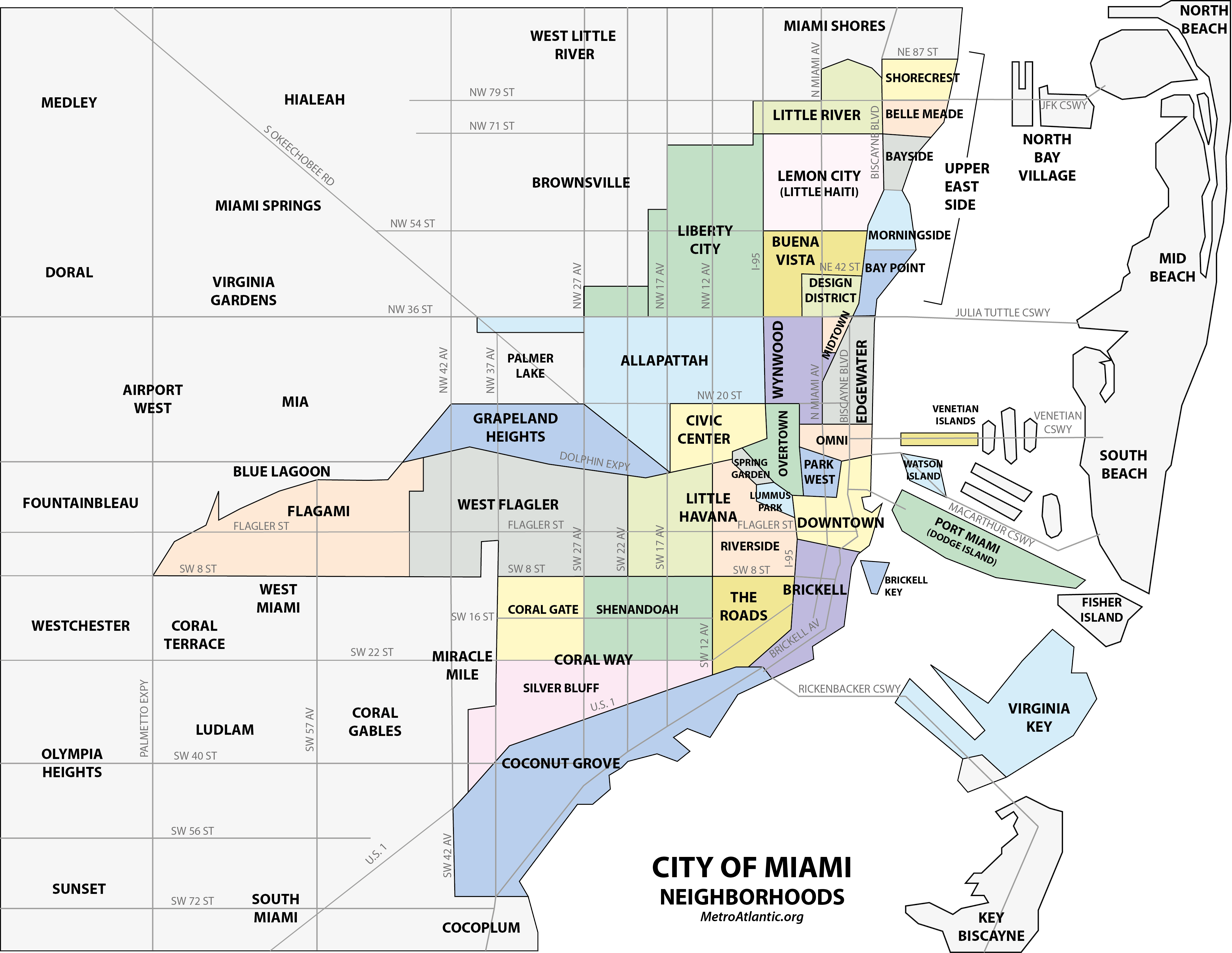
- Grapeland Heights neighborhood within the City of Miami
- Coordinates: 25.792058°N 80.257874°W
- Country: United States
- State: Florida
- County: Miami-Dade County
- City: Miami

Government
  - City of Miami Commissioner: Alex Diaz de la Portilla
  - Miami-Dade Commissioners: Eileen Higgins
  - House of Representatives: Luis R. Garcia, Jr. (D)
  - U.S. House: Maria Elvira Salazar (R)
- Elevation: 10 ft (3.0 m)

Population (2010)
  - Total: 14,004
  - Density: 10,697/sq mi (4,130/km^{2})
- Time zone: UTC-05 (EST)
- ZIP Code: 33125, 33126
- Area codes: 305, 786

Grapeland Heights is a neighborhood in the city of Miami, Florida, United States. It is just east of Miami International Airport and north of Miami's West Flagler neighborhood. It is primarily a single-family residential neighborhood with a significant maritime industry along the neighborhood's eastern end along the Miami River.

== History ==
In May 2008, Grapeland Water Park opened next to the Melreese Country Club. Designed by the Pop artist Romero Britto, the Grapeland Water Park was the first water park to open in Miami. The park is also the largest city park in Grapeland Heights, and has proved very popular amongst young Miamians. In June 2011, it received national recognition from the City Parks Alliance chosen for its excellence in design and innovation.

In 2026, Nu Stadium will be opened at Miami Freedom Park, directly attached to Grapeland Water Park.

== Geography ==
Grapeland Heights is located between NW 21st Street and the Dolphin Expressway from W 42nd Avenue (LeJeune Road) to the Miami River.

== Education ==
Miami-Dade Public Library operates all area public libraries:

- Grapeland Heights Library, now closed replaced by Grapeland Heights waterpark

== Transportation ==
Grapeland Heights is served by Metrobus throughout the area, and by Tri-Rail. The Miami Intermodal Center in Grapeland Heights is served by Miami Metrorail and Tri-Rail.

Metrorail

- Miami Central Station (Airport) (NW 21st Street and 37th Avenue)

Tri-Rail:

- Miami Intermodal Center (NW 21st Street and 37th Avenue)

== Places of interest ==
- Grapeland Water Park
- Nu Stadium
