= Charley Diamond =

American gridiron football player (1936–2020)

No. 67, 79
- Position: Tackle

Personal information
- Born: July 19, 1936; Miami, Florida, U.S.
- Died: May 10, 2020 (aged 83); Miami, Florida, U.S.
- Listed height: 6 ft 2 in (1.88 m)
- Listed weight: 262 lb (119 kg)

Career information
- High school: Archbishop Curley (Miami)
- College: Miami (FL) (1955–1958)
- NFL draft: 1959: undrafted

Career history
- BC Lions (1959); Dallas Texans/Kansas City Chiefs (1960–1963); Miami Dolphins (1966)*
- * Offseason or practice squad member only

Awards and highlights
- AFL champion (1962)
- Stats at Pro Football Reference

Charles John Diamond Jr. (July 19, 1936 – May 10, 2020) was an American professional football tackle who played four seasons in the American Football League (AFL) with the Dallas Texans/Kansas City Chiefs. He played college football at the University of Miami. Diamond was also a member of the BC Lions of the Canadian Football League (CFL). He was a member of the Texans team that won the 1962 AFL championship.

== Early life and college ==
Charles John Diamond Jr. was born on July 19, 1936, in Miami, Florida. He attended Archbishop Curley-Notre Dame High School in Buena Vista, Miami, Florida. He earned Miami Herald and Miami News All-City team honors. Diamond also won a gold medal and set a state record at the shot put state finals. He graduated in 1955. He was inducted into the school's hall of fame in 2013.

Diamond was a member of the Miami Hurricanes of the University of Miami from 1955 to 1958 and a three-year letterman from 1956 to 1958.

== Professional career ==
Diamond played in two games for the BC Lions of the Canadian Football League in 1959 as a tackle. He wore jersey number 67 with the Lions.

Diamond was signed by the Dallas Texans of the American Football League (AFL) in 1960. He played in 14 games, starting four, as an offensive tackle during the team's inaugural 1960 season. He appeared in all 14 games, starting one, during the 1961 season. Diamond played in all 14 games for the third consecutive season, starting five, in 1962. The Texans finished the season with an 11–3 record. Diamond then played in the 1962 AFL Championship Game, a 20–17 victory over the Houston Oilers. The Texans became the Kansas City Chiefs in 1963. Diamond appeared in nine games, starting eight, for the Chiefs during the 1963 season. He was released in 1963.

Diamond signed with the Miami Dolphins of the AFL in 1966 but was later released on August 15, 1966.

== Personal life ==
Diamond's brother Bill Diamond also played for the Chiefs in 1963. Charley was a teacher and coach in the Miami-Dade school district after his football career. He was also a donor to the Rosenstiel School of Marine and Atmospheric Science. Diamond died on May 10, 2020, in Miami.
