= Miami Ironside =

Neighborhood in Miami, Florida

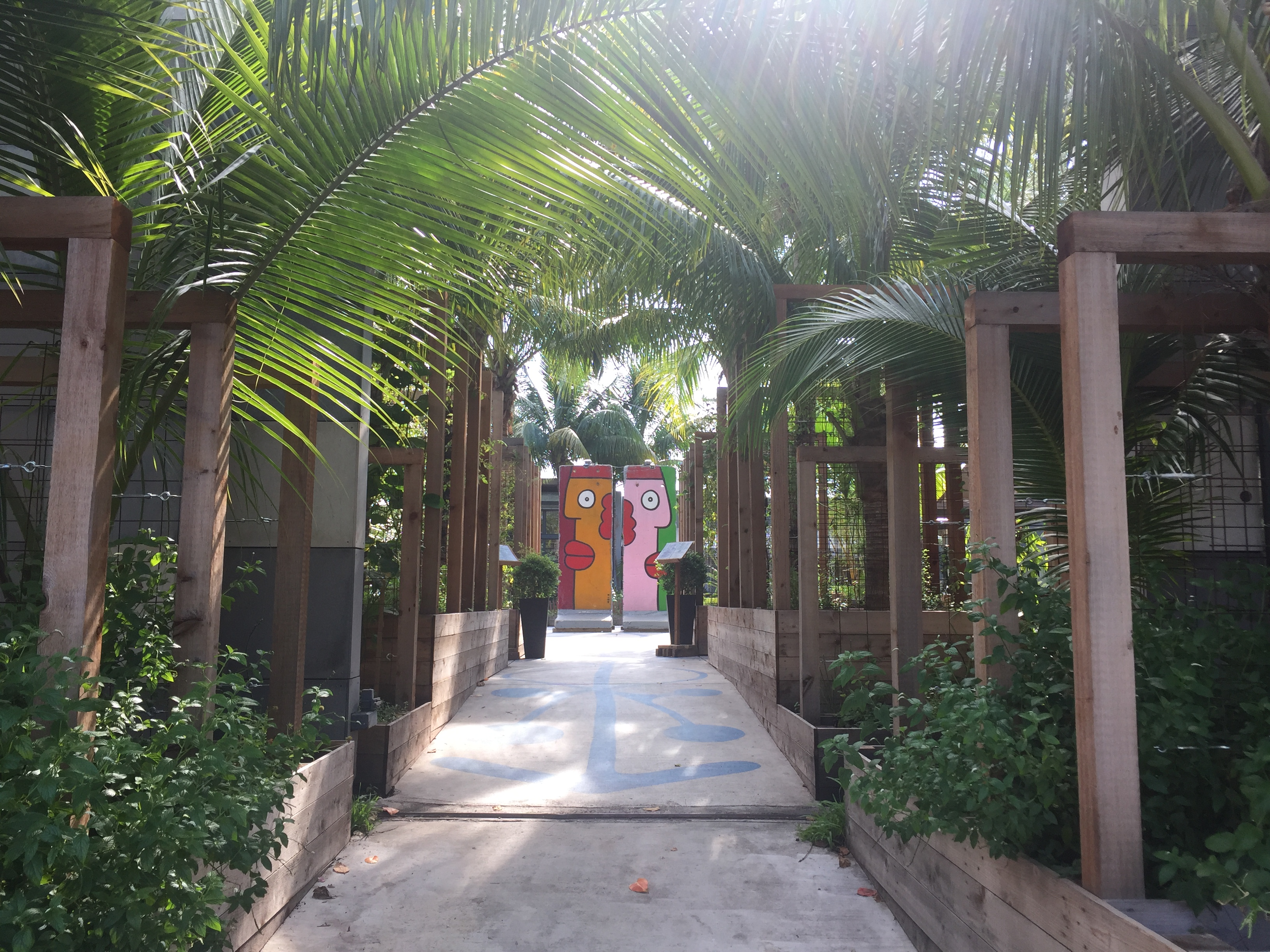
The main piazza of Miami Ironside

Miami Ironside is an urban art and design district located in Miami's Upper Eastside, off of the MiMo Historic Biscayne Boulevard.

The stretch of industrial warehouses was acquired in by local developer Ofer Mizrahi and envisioned as an interconnected network of mixed-purpose architectural complexes. An extension of the development is the Miami Art Space Gallery, located in the Wynwood Art District. On the facade of the building is the mural painting "Confetti" by artist Kenneth Treister.

Miami Ironside is home to 65 designer showrooms, art galleries, architecture firms, creative services, and a public piazza with permanent Berlin Wall sculptures painted by street artist Thierry Noir. Twice a year, Ironside hosts a Campus Collective, a community event.

== See also ==
- Miami Modern architecture
- Little Haiti
- Midtown Miami
- Wynwood
- Buena Vista
- Miami Design District
