= Bill Frohbose =

American football player (born 1952)

Gary Wimmer
No. 39
- Position: Safety

Personal information
- Born: May 20, 1952 (age 74); Washington, D.C.
- Listed height: 6 ft 0 in (1.83 m)
- Listed weight: 185 lb (84 kg)

Career information
- High school: Archbishop Curley-Notre Dame
- College: Miami (FL)
- NFL draft: 1974: undrafted

Career history
- Detroit Lions (1974)

Career NFL statistics
- Games played: 2
- Games started: 0
- Stats at Pro Football Reference

William Joseph Frohbose (May 20, 1952 - September 3, 2000) was an American professional football safety who played in the National Football League for one season. He played college football at the University of Miami and was signed by the Detroit Lions as an undrafted free agent in 1974. He died on September 3, 2000 as a result of amyotrophic lateral sclerosis.

== Early life ==
Frohbose was a standout defensive back at Archbishop Curley-Notre Dame in Miami. A 1969 graduate, Frohbose was named as one of Miami-Dade's best football players of all time by the Miami Herald in 2008.

Frohbose went on to play college football for four seasons at the University of Miami.

== Professional career ==
Frohbose signed with the Detroit Lions as an undrafted free agent following the 1974 NFL draft. Frohbose was activated to Detroit's roster on December 5, and played in the team's final two games of the season against the Cincinnati Bengals and Philadelphia Eagles.
