= Riverside (Miami) =

- Neighborhood of Miami
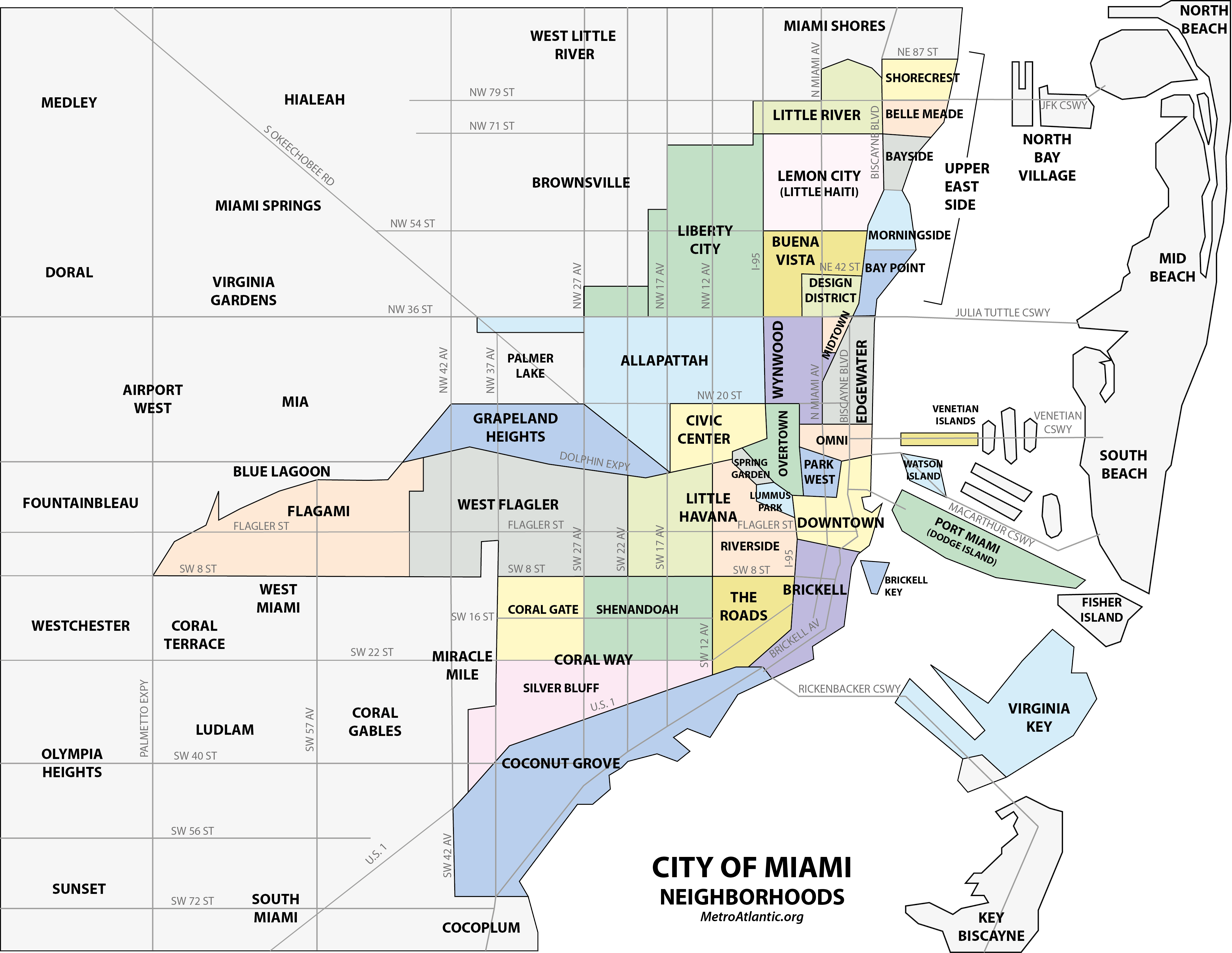
- Coordinates: 25°46′25″N 80°12′30″W
- Country: United States
- State: Florida
- County: Miami-Dade County
- City: Miami

Population
  - Total: 18,543
  - Density: 29,628/sq mi (11,439/km^{2})
- Time zone: EST
- Postal codes: 33125, 33135

Riverside is a neighborhood in Miami, Florida, United States.

== History ==
Riverside was Miami's first subdivision west of the Miami River. The area came to be called “Riverside” for its location next to the Miami River. Mary Brickell (a member of one of Miami’s prominent pioneer families) platted the Riverside subdivision. The most important developers of the areas were the Tatum brothers, creators of the Lawrence Estate Land Company subdivision which represented a large segment of Riverside. They came to Miami from Dawson, Georgia in the late 1890s. The Tatum brothers’ advertisements characterized the area as “The Beautiful Ridge” owing to its verdant, elevated terrain close to the river. In an advertisement appearing in 1906, J.H. Tatum and company exhorted Miamians to “buy a lot in Riverside”, especially since “the electric trolley line will be completed through (Riverside) in 90 days and the price of all lots will be increased 50%”. The Tatum’s sold lots in Riverside, in 1904 for $300 to $350. The area during its early history contained many elegant two story frame homes. As the second and third decade of the 20th century unfolded, many of the newer homes were bungalows.

The Riverside area was connected to nearby downtown Miami by the 12th Street (later Flagler Street) bridge, which opened as a toll-roadway in 1905. The tolls were steep for the time: 10 cents for a pedestrian: 25 cents for a horse-drawn cart. In 1909, the City of Miami purchased the facility and removed the tolls. Broad Flagler Street was the area’s most important thoroughfare. A Flagler Street trolley began operating in 1915, carrying passengers as far west as S.W. 12th Avenue. Businesses and splendid homes arose along both sides of Flagler Street in the early 1900s. Prominent Miamians of the era lived in the Riverside area. By the 1930s, Riverside’s population was changing. Increasing number of Jews moved into the area, and many of their businesses, professional offices, and institutions accompanied them. The Jewish presence continued to grow, and remained a major element of the population until the late 1950s, when an era of postwar prosperity brought another housing boom to Greater Miami. The boom prompted many Riverside residents to suburban developments throughout Dade County.

The earliest Cubans in Miami for which there are recorded information were the Eduardo Luis Gonzalez family who were here in 1896. Another early Cuban family recorded was the Encinosas, who had a home in 1922 at 120 S.W. 8th Street. By the early 20th century a significant number of Cubans already resided in the Riverside area. Riverside’s population mix has undergone many changes in recent decades as huge number of Cubans, Nicaraguans, and other Caribbean and Latin American refugees poured into the area. Because of its large Cuban population, the area began to be called Little Havana or East Little Havana.

I-95, which was completed through Miami Dade County in the late 1960s was built along some of the Riverside area making an impact on the neighborhood. The area beneath I-95 close to the Miami River served as a temporary home in the summer and fall of 1980 for hundreds of Cuban refugees from the Port of Mariel. One of the most prominent landmarks of the Riverside area is the Firestone service station. It was built in 1929 under the personal supervision of Harvey Firestone, who had a mansion on Miami Beach, it was billed as the largest Firestone facility in the world and was considered Mr. Firestone's favorite store. It also sported what was at the time, the largest neon sign in Florida. Although Riverside has been transformed into a vibrant Latin Quarter and many of its historic buildings have been demolished, the Firestone structure still dominates the corner of Flagler Street and Twelfth Avenue. After the building was sold to Walgreens, preservationists convinced the company to retain the old structure, thus guaranteeing its continued presence as a neighborhood icon.

== Churches ==
- St. John Bosco Catholic Church

== Education ==
Miami Dade Public Schools runs the area's public schools:

- Riverside Elementary School
- Ada Merritt K-8 School
- Young Women's Preparatory Academy

== Libraries ==
Miami-Dade Public Library System runs the area's public libraries:

- Hispanic Branch Library

== Parks ==
- Jose Marti Park
- Riverside Park
