= Romero Britto =

Brazilian artist

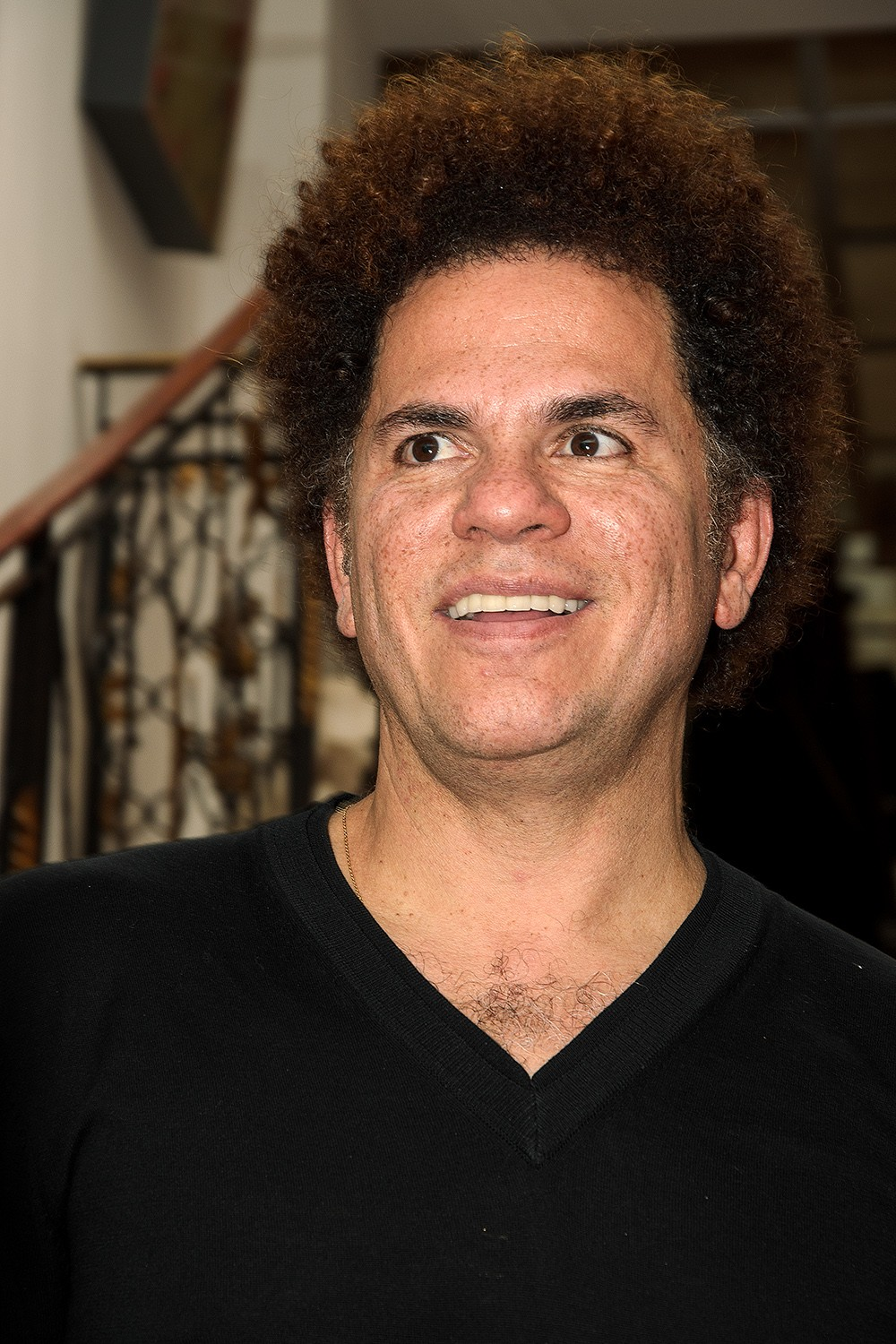
- Born: 6 October 1963 (age 63)
- Known for: Painting, Sculpture
- Style: Pop Art
- Website: britto.com

Romero Britto (born October 6, 1963) is a Brazilian artist, painter, serigrapher, and sculptor. He combines elements of cubism, pop art, and graffiti painting in his work, using vibrant colors and bold patterns as a visual expression of hope, dreams, and happiness.

== Biography ==
Britto was born in Recife, Brazil and grew up in poverty. In 1983 he traveled to Europe to study art, where he was influenced by the works of Henri Matisse and Pablo Picasso. In 1988, he moved to Miami, where his current studio remains. His first major commission was to design artwork for Absolut Vodka for a 1989 campaign. In addition to his sculpture and fine art work, his designs have been used by Disney, BMW, IBM, Apple Computers, Grand Marnier, Pepsi, and Royal Caribbean Cruises, and been featured on a variety of consumer goods, such as Barbie dolls and pet collars. According to a 2023 documentary about him, Britto is "the most collected and licensed artist in history." Much of his work is displayed in and around Miami, including the Grapeland Water Park he designed for the city of Miami, in the neighborhood of Grapeland Heights, which was the city's first water park when it opened in 2008. Some of his public art installations outside Florida are at Hyde Park, London, the O2 Arena in Berlin, and the John F. Kennedy Airport.

Britto's charitable work has supported over 250 organizations.

== Political views ==
Britto is a conservative. In 2015 he hosted a fundraiser for Republican US presidential candidate Jeb Bush at his Miami studio where he unveiled a mural that he and Jeb Bush's wife Columba had painted with the slogan "#AllInForJeb".

Previously, Britto held a fundraiser at his gallery for 2012 Republican presidential candidate Mitt Romney. He publicly supports Brazil's former president Jair Bolsonaro, and in March 2020 he gifted Bolsonaro with his own portrait.

On 22 August 2025 Britto was photographed with US Secretary of the Department Health and Human Services, Robert F. Kennedy Jr., at the unveiling of an art instillation Britto had created for the exterior of the Hubert H. Humphrey Building in Washington, D.C. The artword included both a banner with the slogan "Make America Healthy Again" and incorporated the phrase "Real Food, Real People, Real Health, MAHA".

== Gallery ==
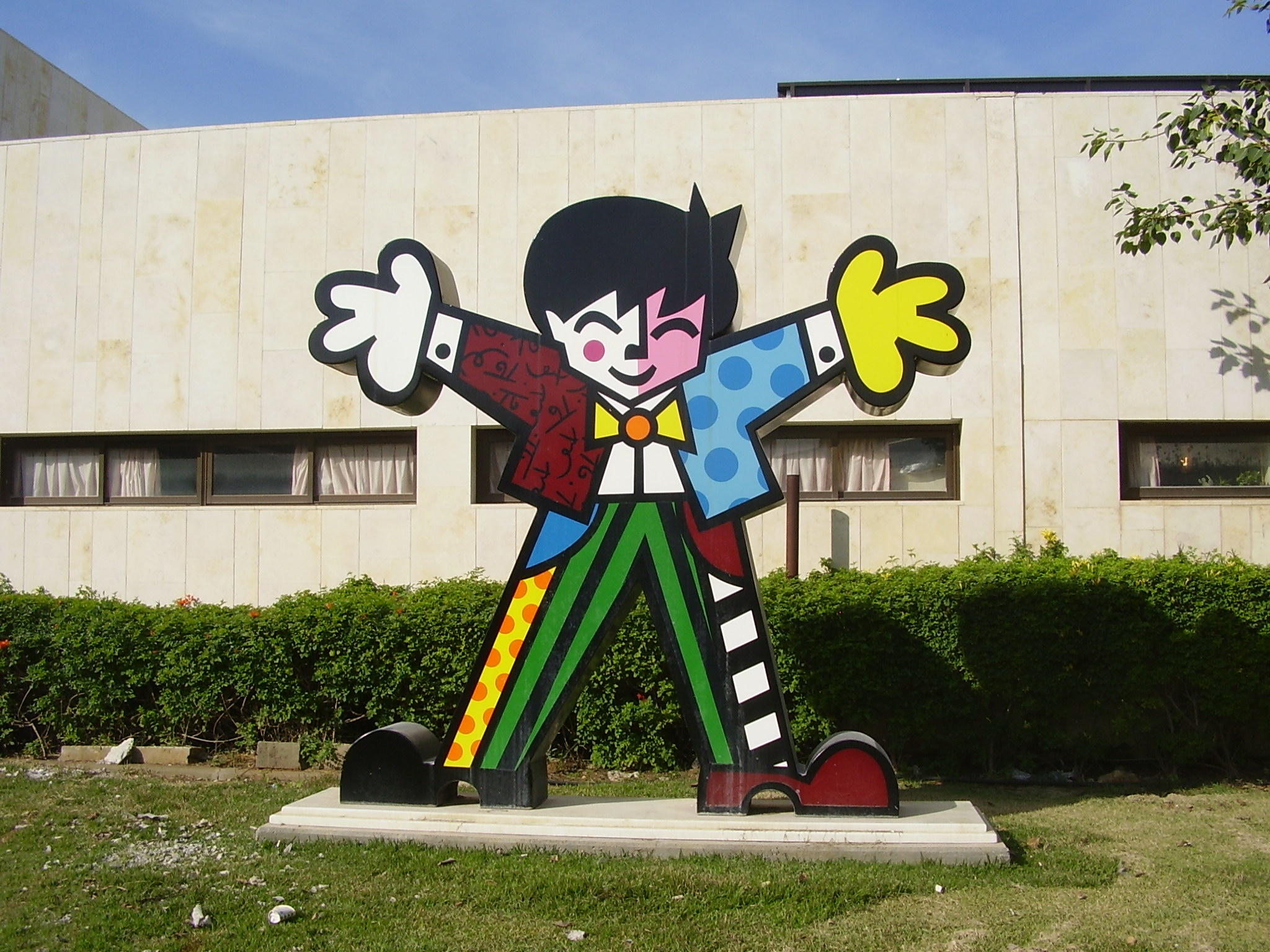
"Wellcome" in the sculpture garden at Sheba Hospital

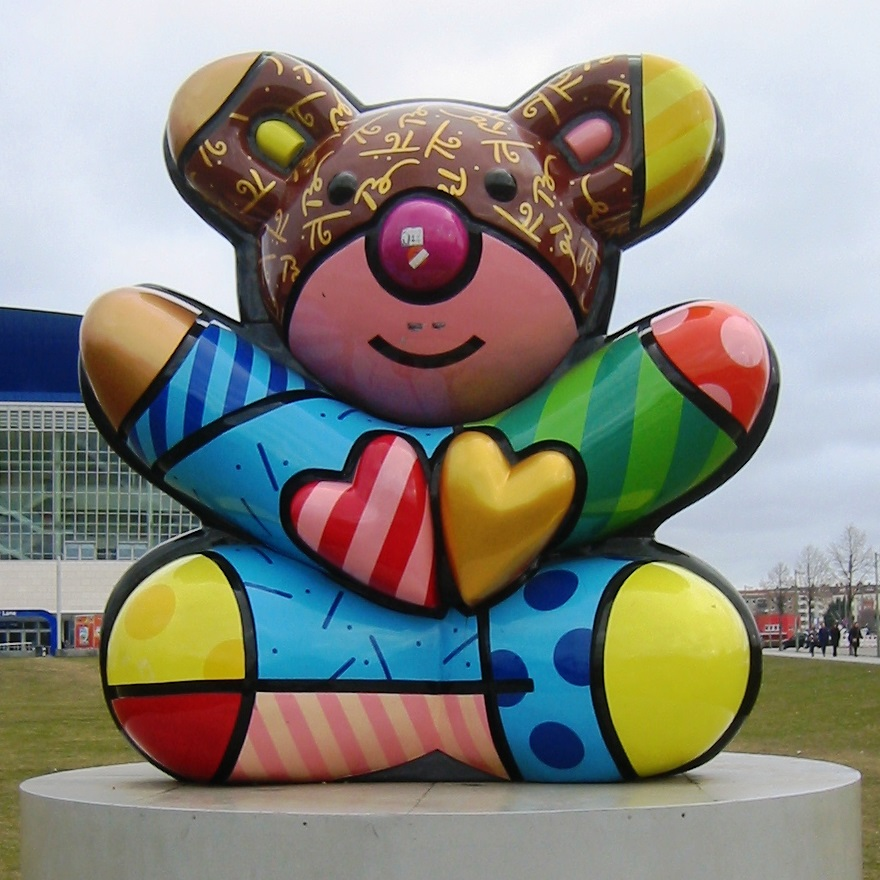
"Best Buddies Friendship" Bear, in Mühlenstraße in Berlin-Friedrichshain in front of the O2 World

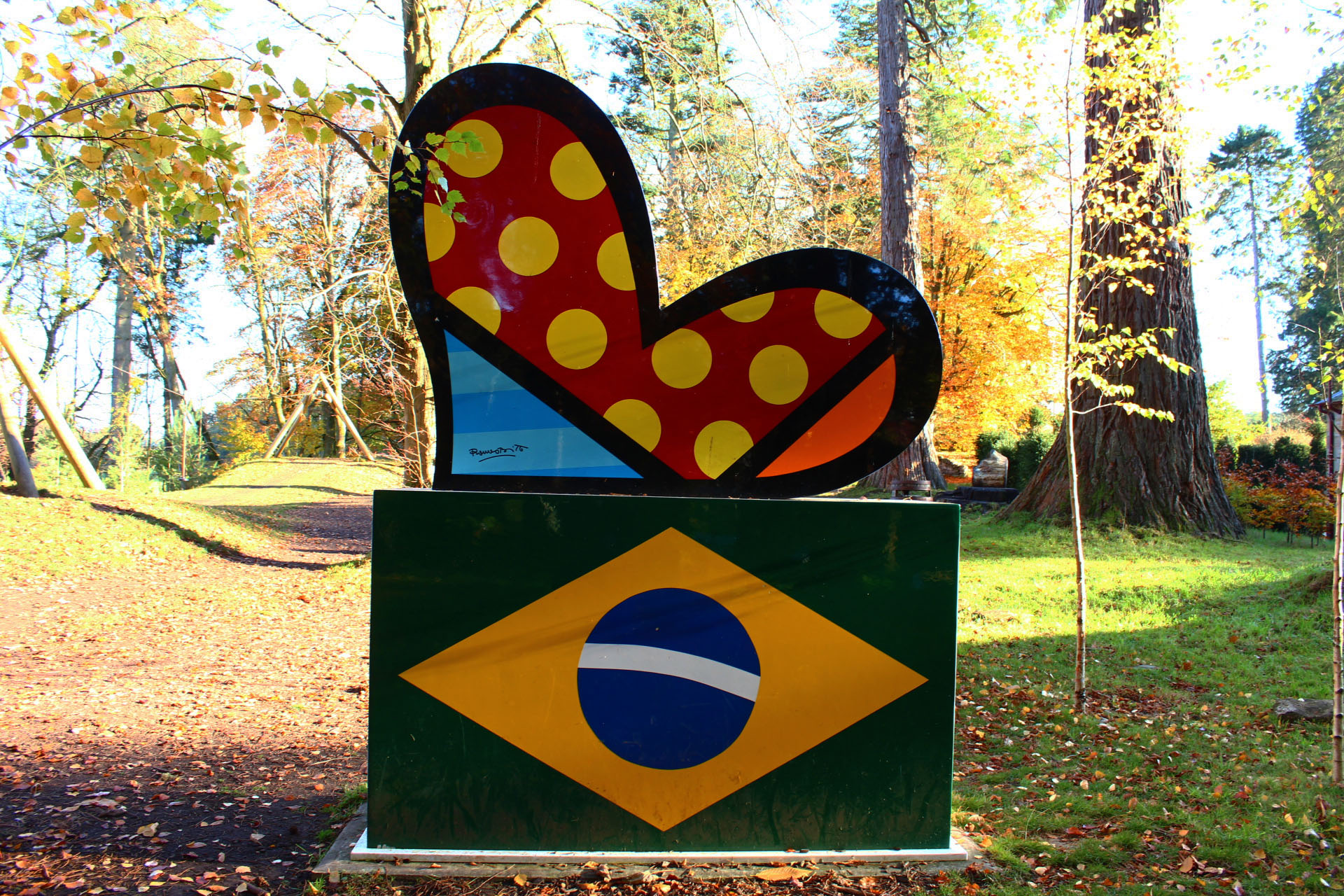

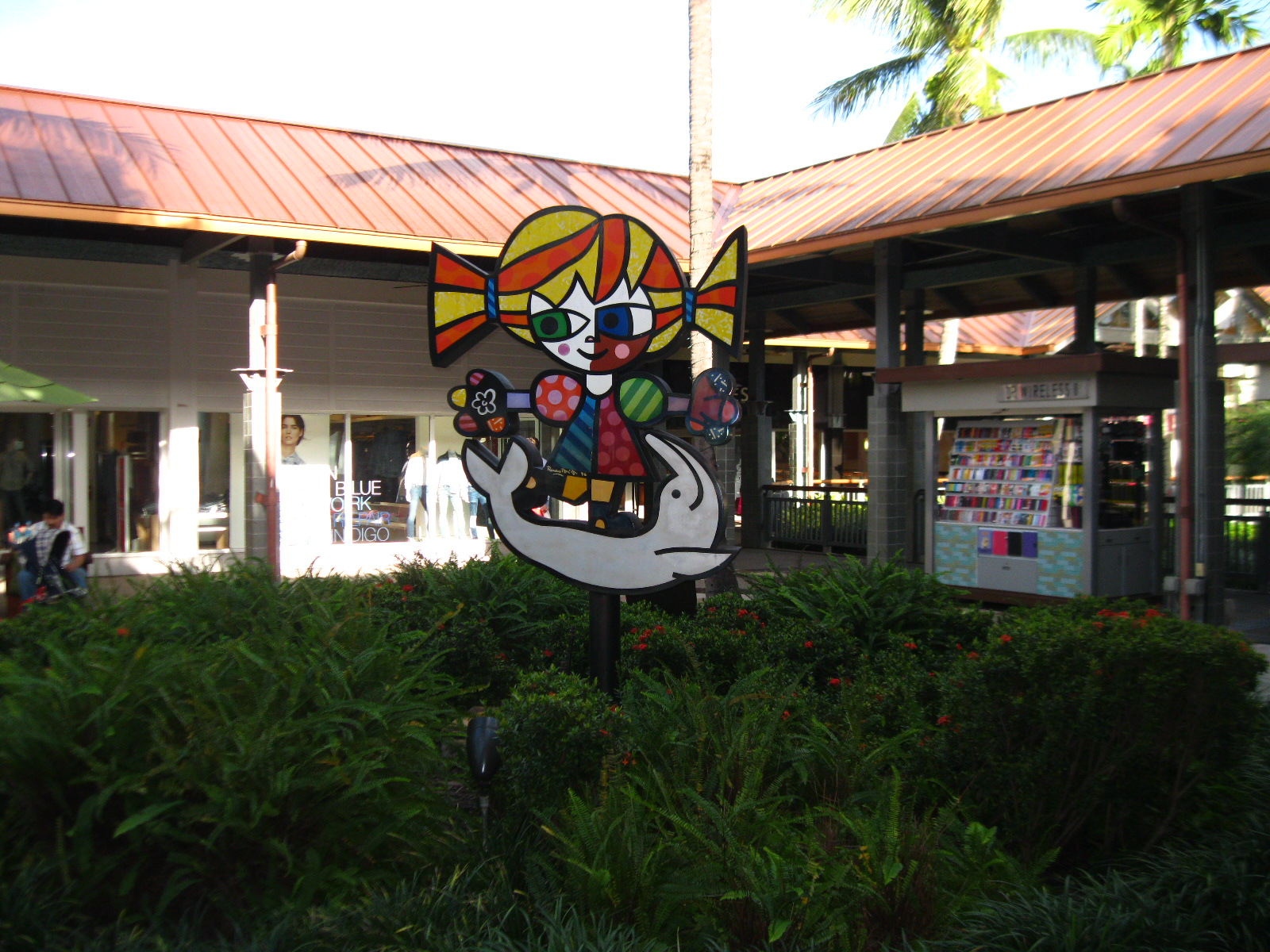
The Falls

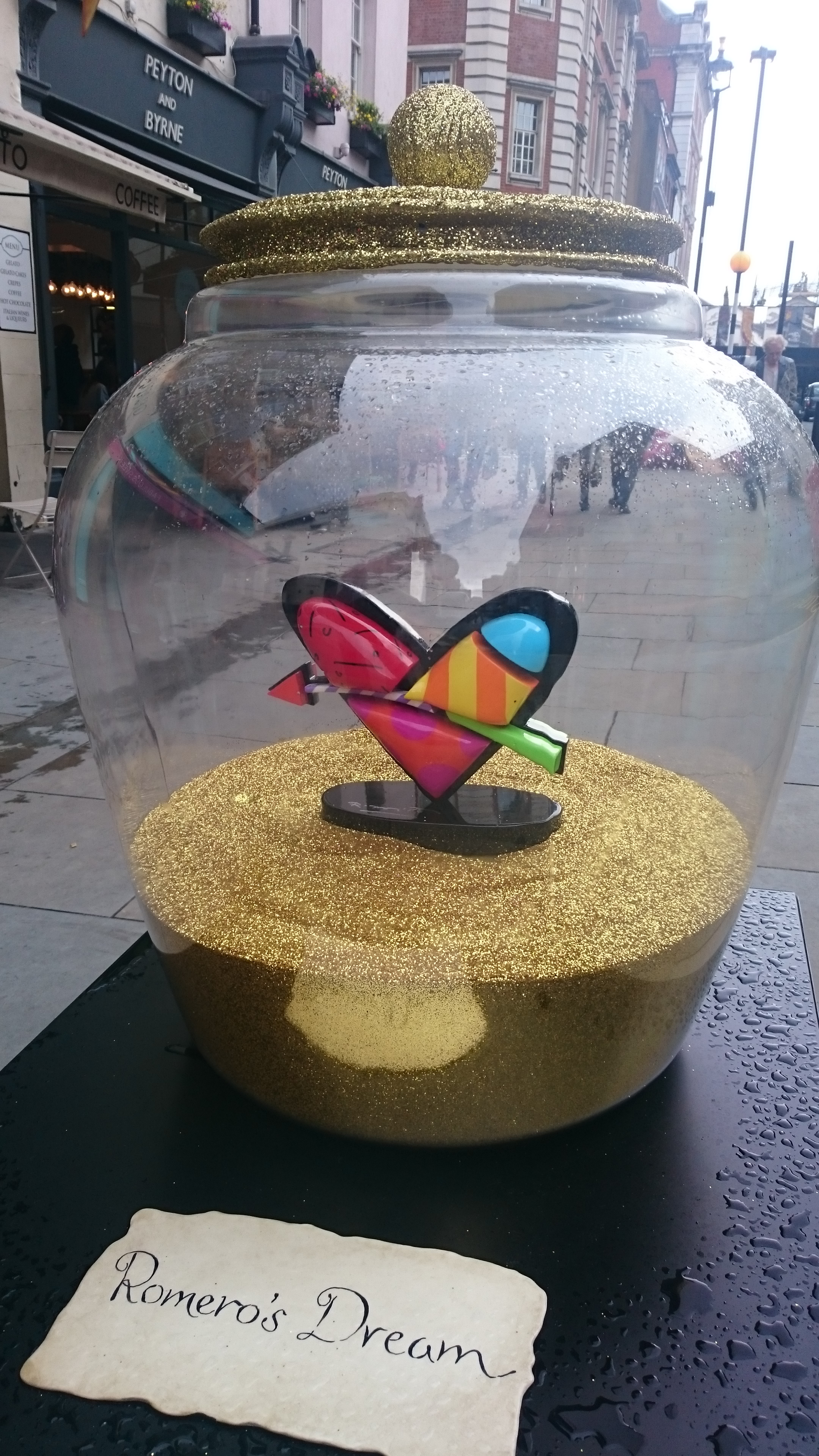
One of the BFG Dream Jars that were part of a trail in London in 2016 for the Spielberg film. This one in Covent Garden is called 'Dream Big'

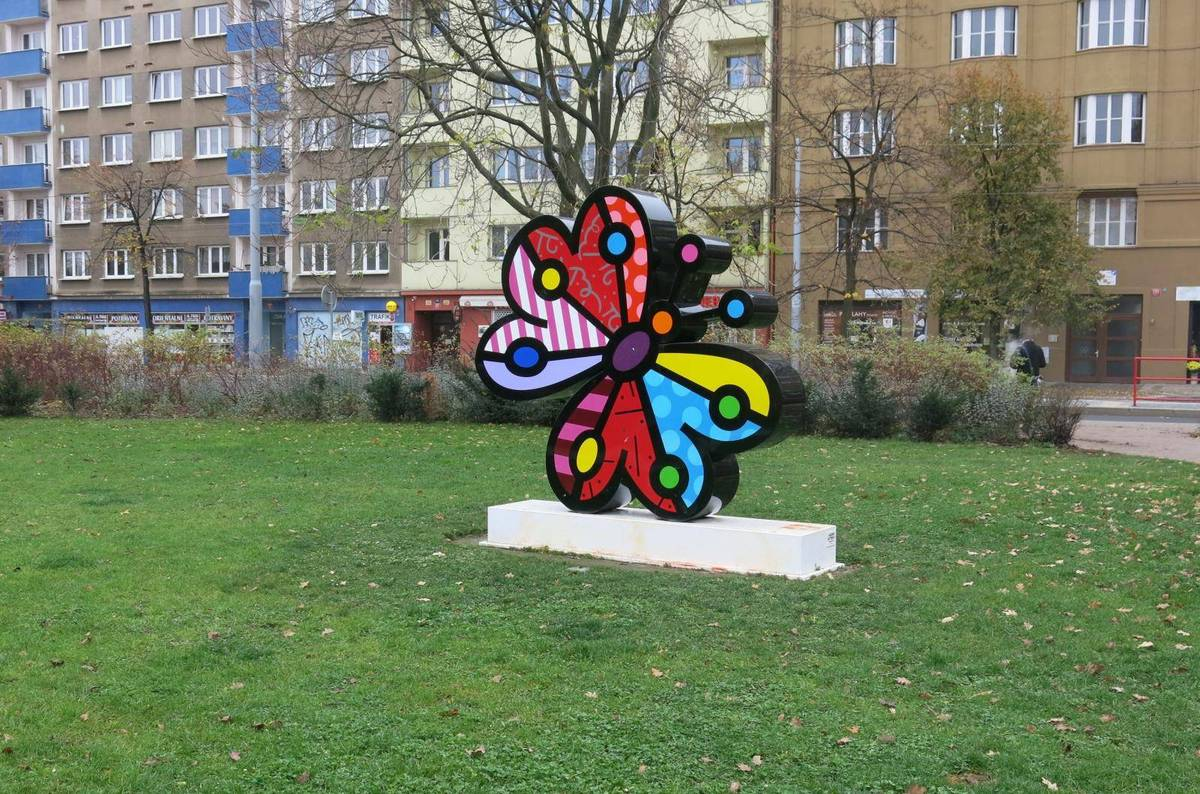

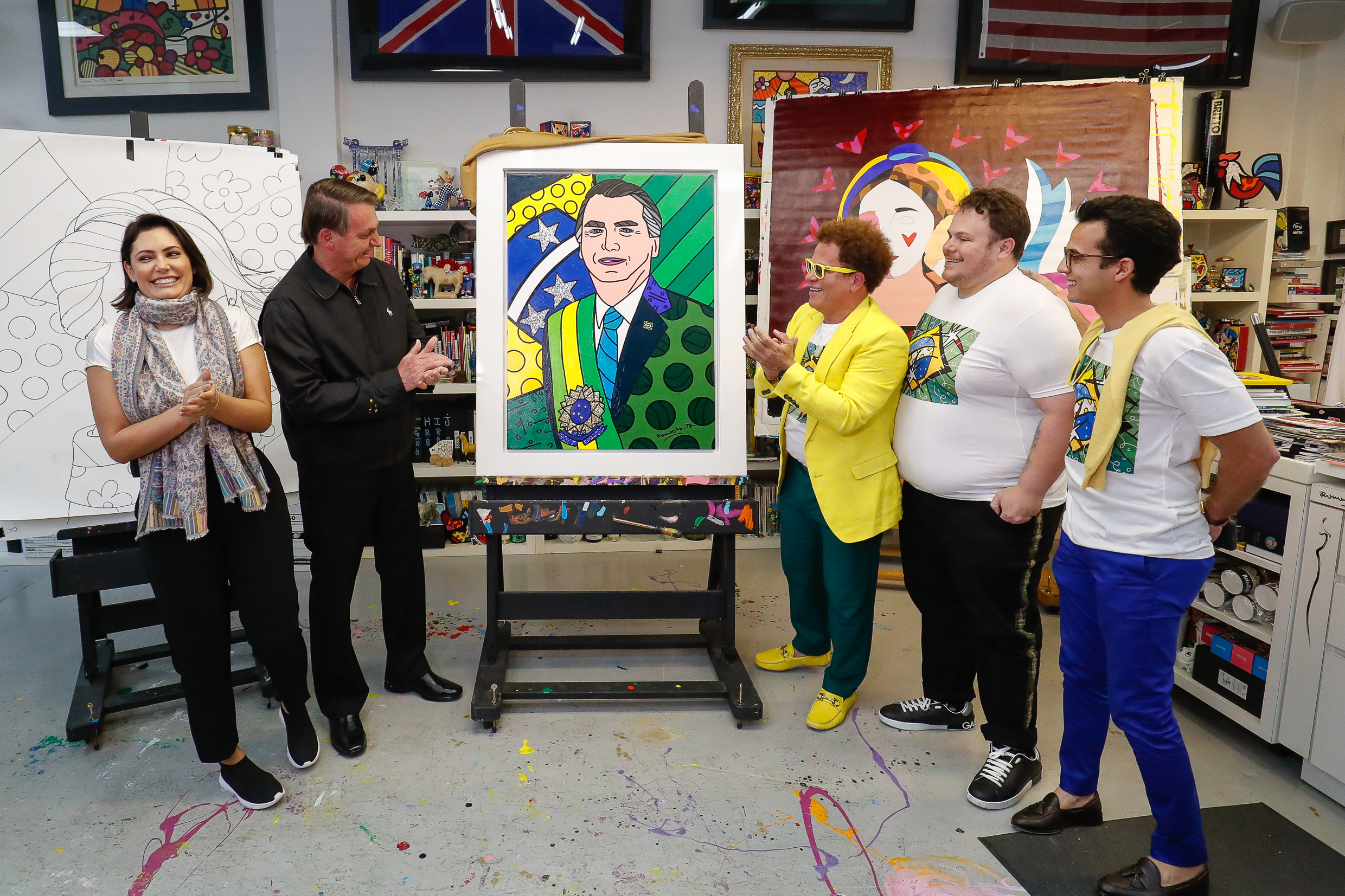
President of Brazil Jair Bolsonaro accompanied by First Lady Michelle Bolsonaro, visit to Britto's studio (Miami Florida, 08/03/2020)

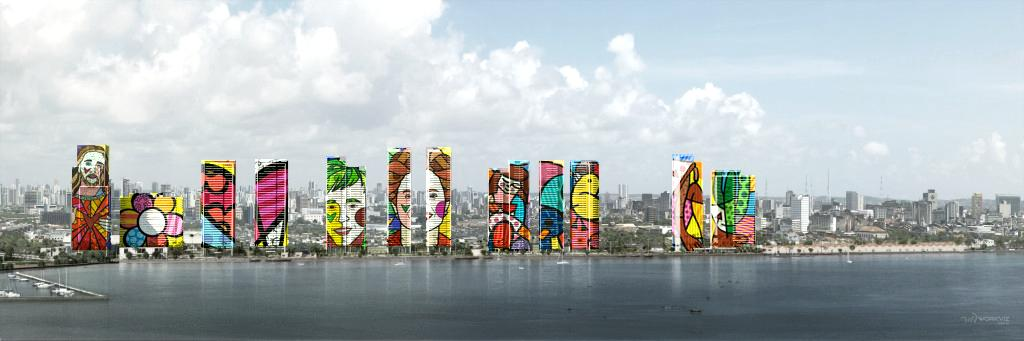

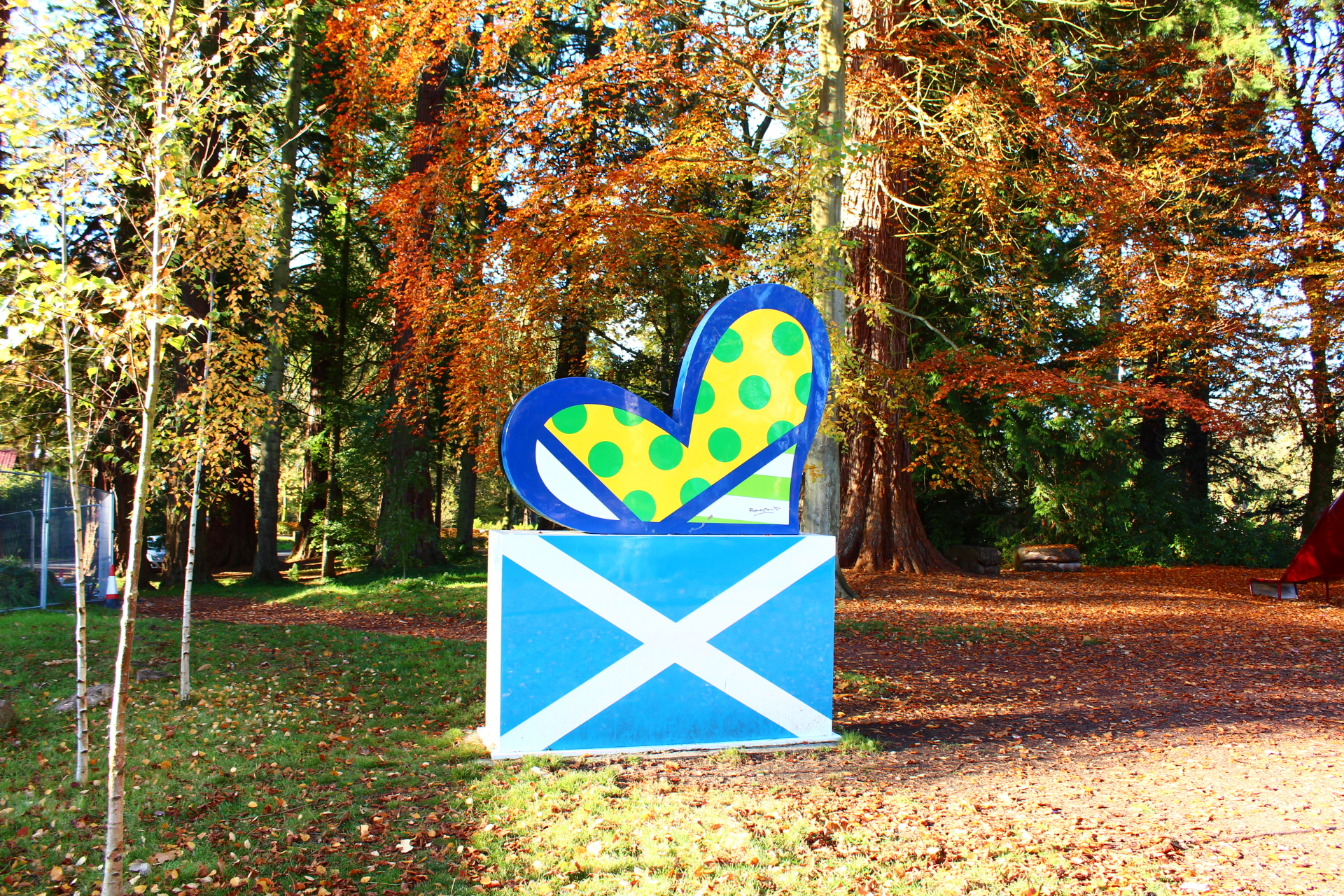

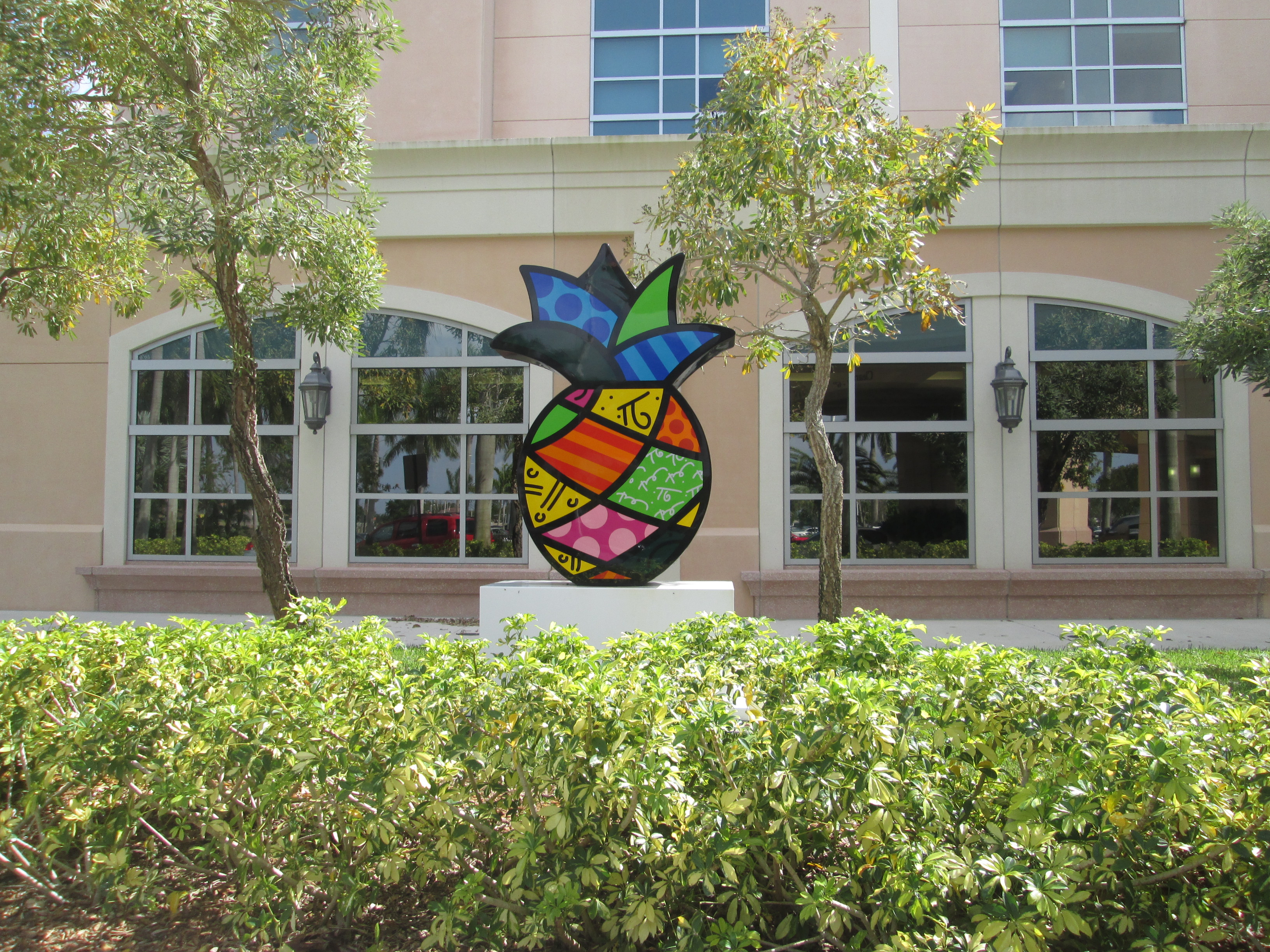
West Kendall Baptist
