= Bay Shore Historic District =

Historic district in Florida, United States

- U.S. National Register of Historic Places
- U.S. Historic district
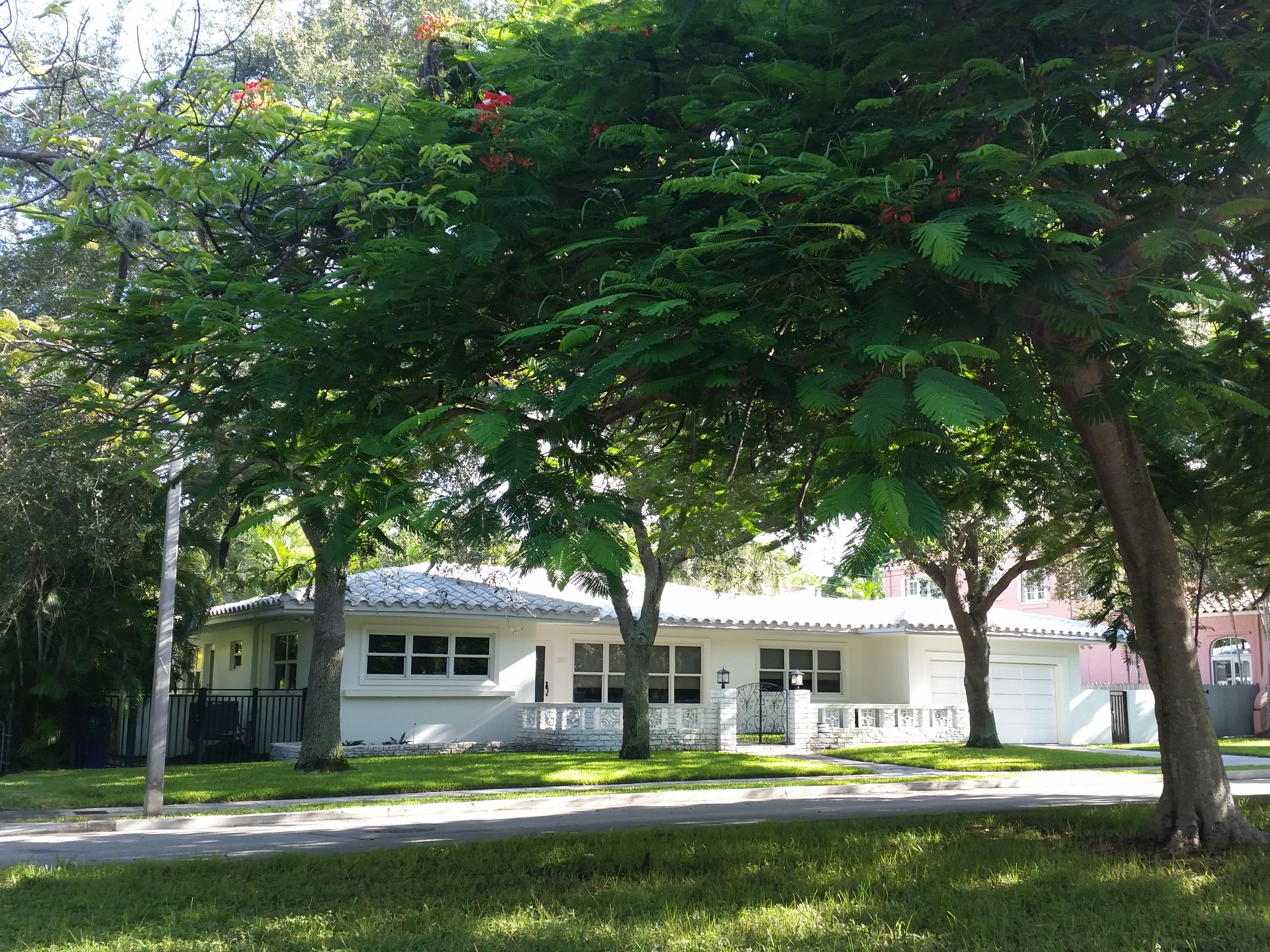
- House in Bay Shore Historic District

- Location within Miami Location within Florida Location within the United States
- Location: Miami, Florida
- Coordinates: 25°49′41″N 80°10′59″W
- Area: 900 acres (360 ha)
- NRHP reference No.: 92001323
- Added to NRHP: October 2, 1992

The Bay Shore Historic District (also known as Morningside Historic District) is a U.S. historic district (designated as such on October 2, 1992) located in Miami, Florida. The district is bounded by Northeast 55th Street, Biscayne Boulevard, Northeast 60th Street and Biscayne Bay, in the Morningside section of the Upper Eastside neighborhood. It contains 223 historic buildings.

== History ==
The Bay Shore Investment Company developed the bay-front tract in three phases from 1922 to 1924. Bay Shore was notable for it level of development before lots were sold. Streets were paved, landscaping and street lighting were in place. The development grew during Miami's boom years in the 1920s and even during the Depression, but its greatest growth was between 1936 and 1942, until the U.S. entry into World War II halted nearly all construction in Miami.

The district is one of Miami's historic neighborhoods, and its best remaining example of a planned, boom-era suburb.

== Architecture ==
The district is residential, with 156 residences and 67 outbuildings contributing to its historic character. All are one or two story masonry buildings, in a wide variety of earth 20th century styles, including Mediterranean Revival, Art Deco, Colonial Revival, Mission, and Masonry Vernacular. All of the contributing buildings were constructed between 1922 and 1942. To protect the character of the neighborhood, the City of Miami designated Bay Shore a local historic district in 1984.
