= Buena Vista (Miami) =

- Neighborhood of Miami
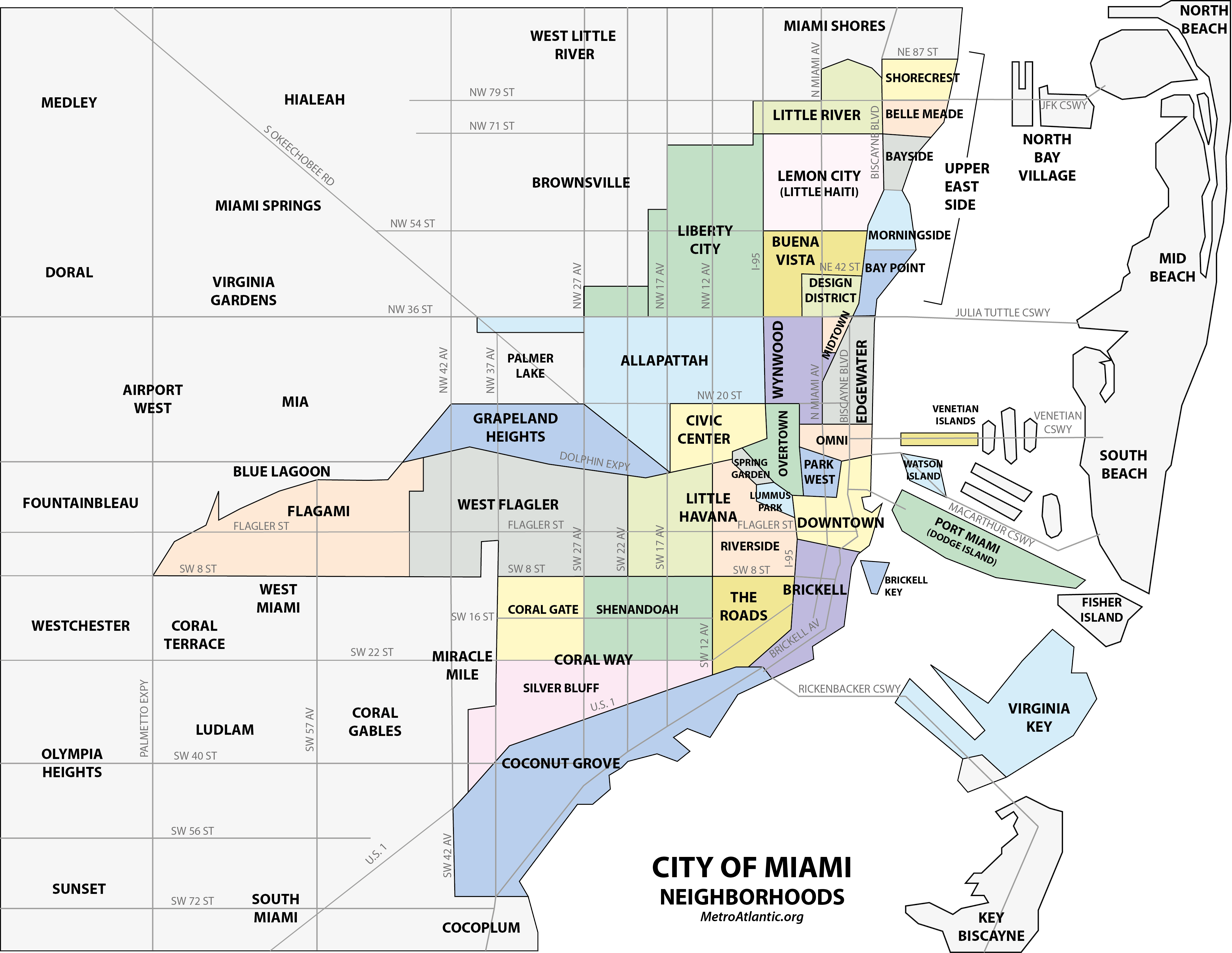
- Buena Vista neighborhood within the City of Miami
- Coordinates: 25°48′47.3″N 80°11′34.57″W
- Country: United States
- State: Florida
- County: Miami-Dade County
- City: City of Miami
- Settled: 1892
- Annexed into the City of Miami: 1924
- Subdistricts of Buena Vista: Neighborhoods list: Buena Vista East Historic District

Government
  - City of Miami Commissioner: Richard Dunn
  - Miami-Dade Commissioner: Audrey Edmonson
  - House of Representatives: Daphne Campbell (D) and Cynthia A. Stafford (D)
  - State Senate: Larcenia Bullard (D), and Oscar Braynon (D)
  - U.S. House: Frederica Wilson (D)

Population (2010)
  - Total: 9,058
  - Density: 9,168/sq mi (3,540/km^{2})
- Time zone: UTC-05 (EST)
- ZIP Code: 33127, 33137
- Area codes: 305, 786

Buena Vista is a neighborhood in Miami, Florida, United States. It is located south of Little Haiti, north of the Miami Design District.

Buena Vista is primarily a residential neighborhood with historic single-family homes primarily from the 1920s. The Buena Vista East Historic District is located in Buena Vista, and includes some of the oldest homes in the neighborhood.

== History ==
In the 1890s, Buena Vista was a small village, and its founding and growth paralleled Miami's. During the Land Boom of the 1920s, the area was developed as the Biltmore and Shadowlawn subdivisions. Originally home to many Florida cracker immigrants from Georgia and North Carolina, the neighborhood soon became popular with the owners of nearby businesses. The houses reflect their original owners' rising social status and include examples of Mediterranean Revival, Mission, Craftsman, and Art Deco style residences.

Buena Vista, Lemon City, and Little River were founded before the turn of the 20th century and represent some of the early settlements in Miami-Dade County. The area known as Buena Vista was once a small village adjoining, but not within the corporate limits of Miami proper. Although preceded in age by pioneer Lemon City, a town located north, the village of Buena Vista dates its birth, development, and growth along with Miami’s. The founding of Buena Vista dates back to the days when the immense rock ridge extending between the Atlantic Ocean and the Florida Everglades was covered by a dense pine forest. The earliest history of the village is recorded in a survey made by government surveyors, and the locations of tracts are to this date still founded on this early document.

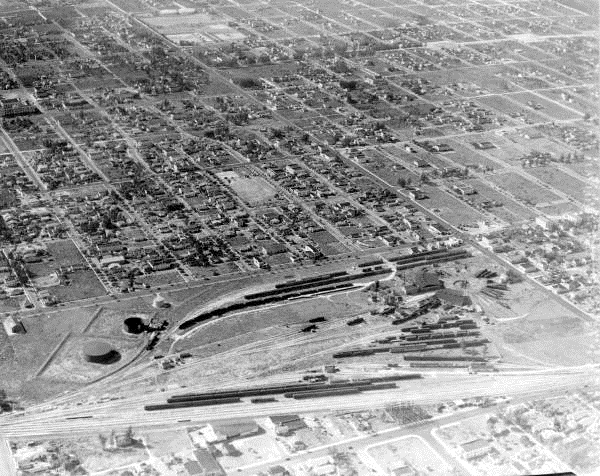
Northwestward aerial of the FEC Buena Vista yard in 1928, now the Midtown Miami development.

The land which became Buena Vista originally was part of the homesteads of William Henry Gleason and E.L. White. Gleason, a prominent and somewhat notorious figure in early Miami-Dade County politics, arrived in Miami after the Civil War, and he was elected lieutenant governor of Florida. He left the area in 1876 but retained his homestead for several years, eventually giving it to his son. As early as 1892, E.L. White homesteaded the area from North 41st Street to 54th Street between West 2nd Avenue and East 2nd Avenue. This area includes the Biltmore and Shadowlawn subdivisions, which today make up the Buena Vista East Historic District.

The arrival of the railroad in 1896 marked the end of an era for the pioneer bayfront village of Lemon City, which had enjoyed tremendous importance to the Miami area by virtue of its docks. The train brought supplies to the rest of Dade County and lured people from the bayfront community to Miami and its outlying areas. The Lemon City depot, built in 1896, drew business west from the bay, and the village of Buena Vista gradually developed. One of the early subdivisions in the Buena Vista areas was the Buena Vista Biscayne Badger Club, which was developed in 1910 as a bayfront community with a private water plant, streets, and a park with recreation dock on the bay. However, it was inland where the village took shape. By 1910, suburban Buena Vista could boast of one hotel known as the Courley House, its very own railroad depot on the Florida East Coast Railway line, a small post office building, groves of tropical fruits, a fruit-packing house, a grocery store, and the Holy Cross Episcopal Church.

Other prominent citizens acquired land in Buena Vista. Among them was the millionaire Charles Deering, who purchased a large tract of bayfront land east of the railroad, in the area now known as the Upper Eastside. This land is where the Baypoint neighborhood is now located. Much of the area fronting the bay was naturally wooded, and Deering created an arboretum and sanctuary for birds and animals. There were no public roadways in the area east of the railroad, and because Deering strongly opposed the opening of such streets, the area was preserved in its pristine state for many years.

As the population of Miami grew between the late 1910s through the Boom era of the early 1920s, new areas reached northward along the old Dixie Highway (NE 2nd Avenue) and Avenue D (N. Miami Avenue), which extended northward from NE 36th Street. The northern city limit of Miami was moved to NE 38th Street, and this took in a part of Buena Vista. On August 4, 1924, the town of Buena Vista was incorporated, and with the other incorporated areas of Coconut Grove and Silver Bluff, it was annexed to the City of Miami the following year.

== Geography ==
It is located at 25.813°N 80.192°W, with an elevation 13 feet (4.0 m), making it one of the higher areas in the city. It is bounded by NW 54th Street to the north, I-195 to the south, I-95 to the west, and Biscayne Boulevard to the east.

=== Buena Vista East Historic District ===
The Buena Vista East Historic District is located on the eastern side of Buena Vista, and is bound between NE 2nd Avenue and Miami Avenue from NE 42nd Street to NE 48th Street.

== Demographics ==
As of 2000, the population of Buena Vista was 11,290 people. The zip codes for Buena Vista include 33127 and 33137. The area covers 1.265 square miles (3.28 km^{2}). As of 2000, there were 5,396 males and 5,894 females. The median age for males were 31.5 years old, while the median age for females were 36.9 years old. The average household size had 3.2 people, while the average family size had 3.8 members. The percentage of married-couple families (among all households) was 31.3%, while the percentage of married-couple families with children (among all households) was 14.7%, and the percentage of single-mother households (among all households) was 20.7%. The percentage of never-married males 15 years old and over was 19.4%, while the percentage of never-married females 15 years old and over was 18.5%.

As of 2000, the percentage of people that speak English not well or not at all made up 13.5% of the population. The percentage of residents born in Florida was 41.5%, the percentage of people born in another U.S. state was 16.8%, and the percentage of native residents but born outside the U.S. was 4.3%, while the percentage of foreign born residents was 37.4%.

== Education ==
Miami-Dade County Public Schools operates area public schools:

Elementary schools

- Shadowlawn Elementary School

Middle schools

- Jose De Diego Middle School
- Georgia Jones Ayers Middle School

High schools

- Miami Edison Senior High School
- Design and Architecture Senior High School
- Archbishop Curley-Notre Dame High School, private/Catholic school

== See also ==
- Miami Design District
- Little Haiti
- Liberty City, Miami
