= Upper Eastside =

- Neighborhood of Miami
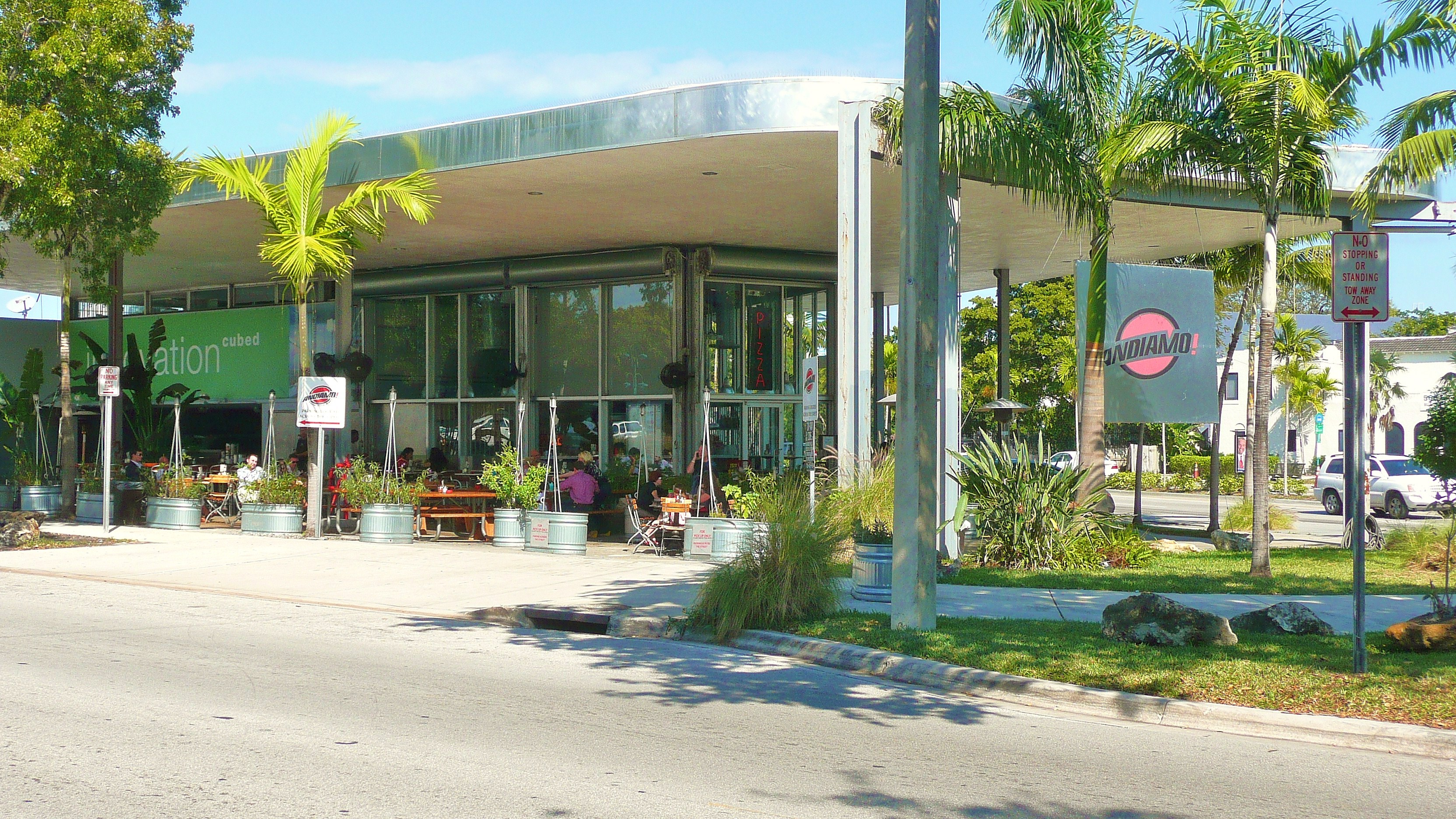
- A MiMo restaurant on Biscayne Boulevard in the Upper Eastside. The Upper Eastside is famous for its post war MiMo architecture, and is home to the MiMo Biscayne Boulevard Historic District.
- Nicknames: The Northeast, The Boulevard
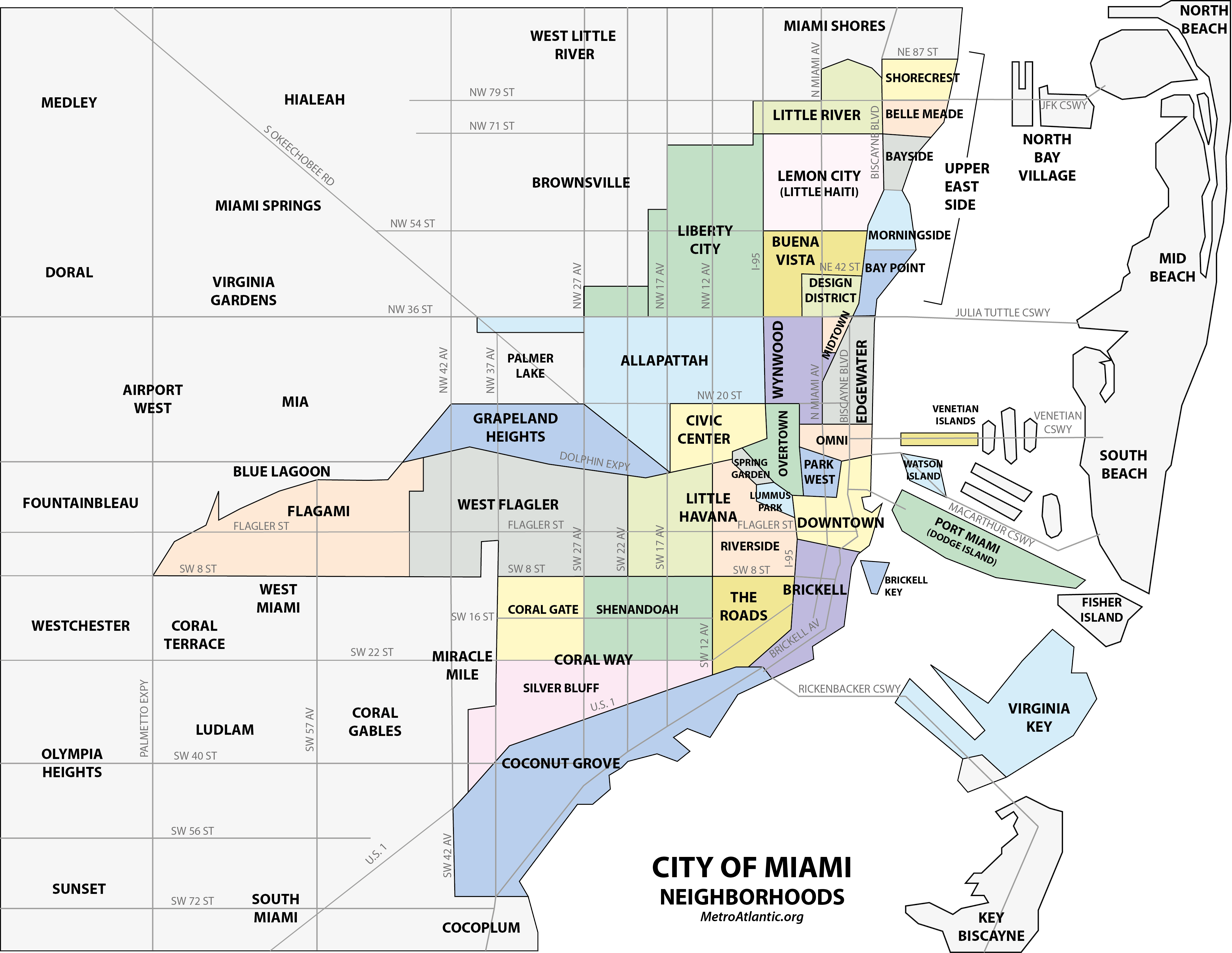
- The Upper Eastside neighborhood within the City of Miami
- Coordinates: 25.829°N 80.185°W
- Country: United States
- State: Florida
- County: Miami-Dade County
- City: Miami
- Settled: 1909
- Annexed into the City of Miami: 1924
- Subdistricts of the Upper East Side: Neighborhoods list: Bay Point Estates; Bayside Historic District; Belle Meade; El Portal; Magnolia Park; MiMo Biscayne Boulevard Historic District; Morningside; Palm Grove; Shorecrest

Population (2010)
  - Total: 12,525
  - Density: 6,509/sq mi (2,513/km^{2})
- Time zone: UTC-05 (EST)
- ZIP Code: 33137, 33138
- Area codes: 305, 786
- Website: Upper East Side neighborhood

The Upper Eastside (alternatively called East Side and commonly referred to as Northeast Miami) is a neighborhood in Miami, Florida. It is north of Edgewater, east of Little Haiti, south of the village of Miami Shores, and sits on Biscayne Bay. In geographical order from south to north and east to west, it contains the subdivisions of Magnolia Park, Bay Point, Morningside, Bayside, Belle Meade, Shorecrest, and Palm Grove. The MiMo District along Biscayne Boulevard in the area is host to many art galleries, shops and restaurants.

The Upper East Side is primarily a residential neighborhood, composed largely of historic single-family homes from the 1920s, 1930s, and 1940s, with Biscayne Boulevard running along the center of the neighborhood with mid-rise and high-rise office towers, hotels, and apartments. The MiMo Historic District runs along Biscayne Boulevard, and includes a large number of Miami Modern architecture hotels from the 1950s and 1960s, that have been preserved, and have recently begun to be renovated, and turned into stores, restaurants and boutique hotels.

== Geography ==
Magnolia Park lies east of Biscayne Boulevard between NE 37th Street (next to the Julia Tuttle Causeway) and NE 39th Street. Bay Point is east of the Boulevard, north of NE 39th Street and south of NE 50th Terrace. Morningside lies east of the Boulevard from NE 50th Terrace to NE 60th Street. Bayside is east of the Boulevard from NE 61st Street to NE 72nd Street. Belle Meade is east of the Boulevard from NE 72nd Terrace to NE 77th Terrace. Shorecrest is east of the Boulevard from NE 78th Street to NE 87th Street. Palm Grove is west of Biscayne Boulevard between NE 54th Street and NE 77th Street Road (i.e.: south of the Little River).

The area between NE 37th Street and NE 54th Street from Biscayne Boulevard westward one block to Federal Highway is not officially part of any of these neighborhoods but is nevertheless part of the UES. Similarly, the area from the Little River north to the city limits and between Biscayne Boulevard on the east and the Little River and the Village of El Portal on the west is not part of any of the aforementioned neighborhoods but is part of the UES.

== Neighborhoods ==
=== Shorecrest ===
Shorecrest is the northernmost sub-neighborhood of the Upper East Side bounded by the Little River on the south (approximately NE 79th Street), Biscayne Boulevard on the west, Miami's northern city limits and the Village of Miami Shores to the north, and Biscayne Bay to the east. As of 2000, the population of Shorecrest was 3,989 people. Shorecrest is an ethnically diverse neighborhood . The racial makeup of the neighborhood was 35.80% Hispanic or Latino of any race, 31.94% White (non-Hispanic), and 29.13% Black or African American.

Shorecrest contains many historic single-family homes dating to the 1930s and 1940s, as well as some multi-family apartments and condominiums along its southern and western boundaries. The main commercial corridors in the neighborhood are 79th Street and Biscayne Boulevard. The area has experienced increased development and revitalization in recent years with the addition of new restaurants and stores. The sub-neighborhood of Daivs Harbor, located east of NE 10th Avenue contains various waterfront homes with access to Biscayne Bay.

=== Palm Grove ===
Palm Grove is a historic neighborhood which lies within the Upper East Side, bounded by Biscayne Boulevard to the east, NE 54th Street to the south, the Little River on the north, and the Florida East Coast Railway tracks on the west. The neighborhood contains many historic homes from the 1920s and 1930s, many of which have recently been renovated and restored. Palm Grove is a diverse community consisting of artists, young professionals, and Haitian immigrants. As of 2000, the population of Palm Grove was 3,349. The racial makeup of the neighborhood was 22.77% Hispanic or Latino of any race, 56.79% Black or African American, and 10.69% White (non-Hispanic).

The Palm Grove Neighborhood contains a significant collection of residential architecture from the early to mid-20th century. The most dominant styles in the district are Spanish Eclectic and Mission, reflecting the strong influence of the Spanish Colonial and Revival styles in Florida during this period. The district also contains notable examples of the Art Deco, Art Moderne, Craftsman, and Colonial Revival styles of the early 20th century. By mid-century, other building styles such as Minimal Traditional and Ranch were constructed. Several dwellings were also built in a local style known as "Miami Modern" or "Mimo."

==== Miami Ironside ====
Ironside is an urban art and design district located in Miami's Upper Eastside, off of the MiMo Historic Biscayne Boulevard and along the northwest boundary of Palm Grove. The stretch of industrial warehouses was acquired in 2003 by local developer Ofer Mizrahi, and envisioned as an interconnected network of mixed-purpose architectural complexes. It is home to over 65 designer showrooms, art galleries, architecture firms, creative services, eateries, residences, multi-purpose spaces, and a public piazza with permanent Berlin Wall sculptures painted by street artist Thierry Noir. Twice a year, Ironside hosts a Campus Collective, a community event.

=== Belle Meade ===
Belle Meade is a sub-neighborhood which lies within the larger enclave of the Upper East Side. It is a private, gated community and the southern part contains a smaller subdivision known as the Bayside Historic District. The northern part contains Belle Meade Island. It is bounded by the Little River to the north, northeast 72nd Terrace to the south, Biscayne Boulevard to the west, and Biscayne Bay to the east.

==== Demographics of Belle Meade ====
As of 2000, the population of Belle Meade had 2,149 people. The zip code for Belle Meade is 33138. The area covers 0.433 square miles (1.12 km^{2}). As of 2000, there were 1,248 males and 900 females. The median age for males were 35.2 years old, while the median age for females were 35.5 years old. The average household size had 2.0 people, while the average family size had 2.8 members. The percentage of married-couple families (among all households) was 26.8%, while the percentage of married-couple families with children (among all households) was 9.0%, and the percentage of single-mother households (among all households) was 3.6%. The percentage of never-married males 15 years old and over was 31.6%, while the percentage of never-married females 15 years old and over was 13.1%.

As of 2000, the percentage of people that speak English not well or not at all made up 6.5% of the population. The percentage of residents born in Florida was 20.4%, the percentage of people born in another U.S. state was 46.8%, and the percentage of native residents but born outside the U.S. was 4.1%, while the percentage of foreign born residents was 28.7%.

As of 2000, the racial makeup of Belle Meade (including the Bayside Historic District) was 42.68% Hispanic or Latino of any race, 1.60% Black or African American, and 52.66% White (non-Hispanic).

=== Morningside ===
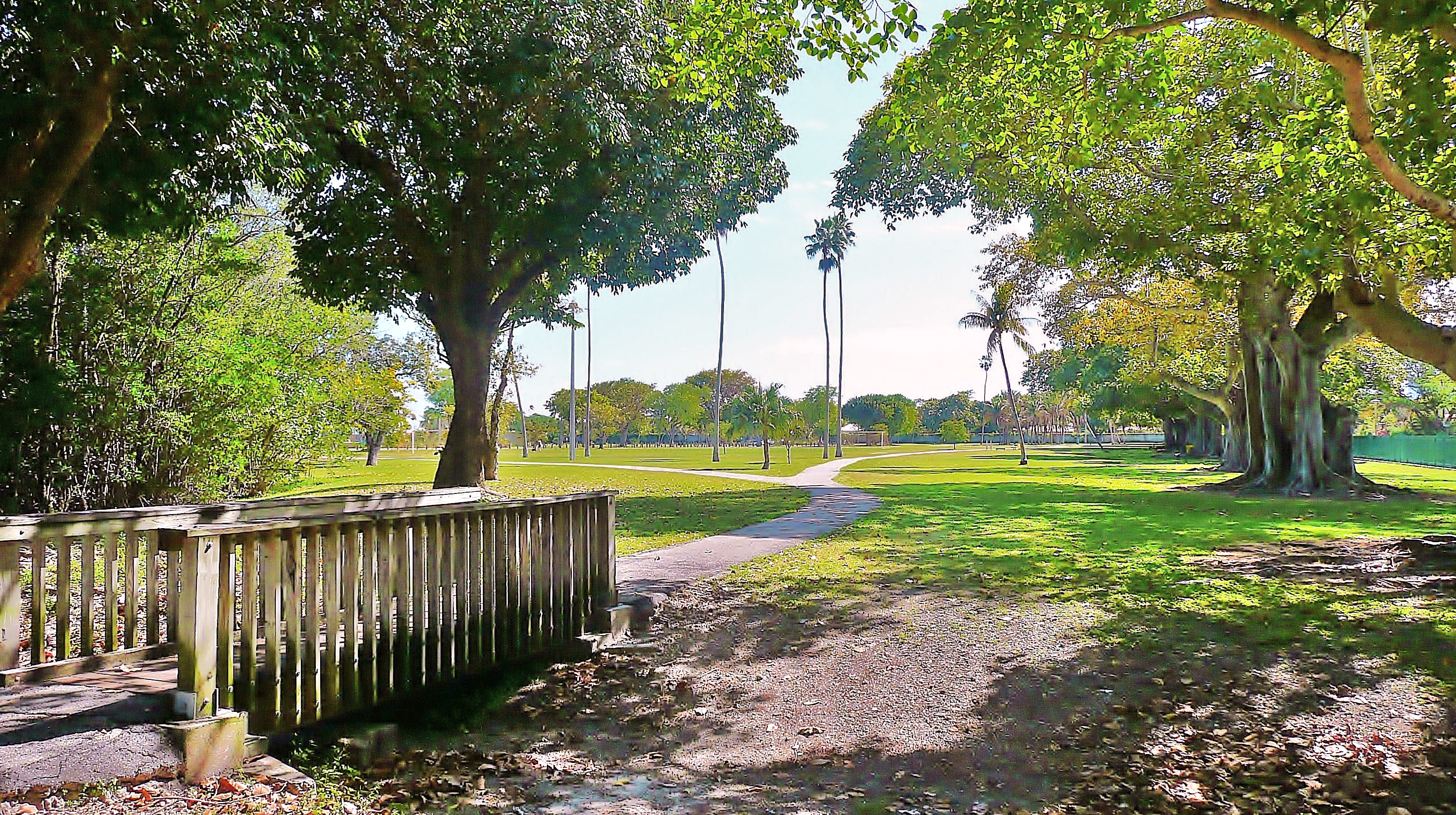
Morningside Park

Morningside is a residential historic sub-neighborhood within the Upper Eastside in an older part of the City of Miami, Florida, United States. It lies mostly to the east of Biscayne Boulevard from NE 50th Terrace to NE 62nd Street. Morningside is just north of and adjacent to Bay Point Estates, another more affluent but less historic residential enclave in urban Miami.

When Pope John Paul II visited the United States, he stayed at what was then the home of Archbishop Edward McCarthy on NE 53rd Street.

==== History of Morningside ====
Started in the 1920s as "Bay Shore," it prospered in the mid-20th century and fell on hard times along with most of Miami's other inner city neighborhoods in the 60's and 70's. More recently Morningside was the first historic area in central Miami to experience gentrification with an influx of more-affluent residents. It has now been fully restored. The Morningside Historic District runs from NE 55th Street to NE 60th Street; it was the first historic district to be designated as such in the City of Miami. The district was added to the National Register of Historic Places in 1992 as the Bay Shore Historic District.

The Morningside Historic District is significant to the history of architecture, landscape architecture, and community development in Miami. Developed primarily between 1922 and 1941, Morningside contains a wealth of Mediterranean, Art Deco, and vernacular style houses that reflect the diversity and direction of architectural design during the 1920s and 1930s. Morningside is one of Miami's best planned subdivisions, featuring wide, tree-lined boulevards that contribute to the character of the area. This neighborhood was envisioned as an exclusive, residential community, and its amenities and location on Biscayne Bay attracted many influential and prominent local residents. One of Miami's most intact historic neighborhoods, Morningside is the city's best remaining example of a boom-era suburb.

The Morningside Historic District stands today as one of Miami's most intact historic neighborhoods. Despite the number of post-1941 buildings in the area, Morningside retains a high degree of historic and architectural integrity. This is due, in part, to the fact that most later buildings are not intrusive, but respect the earlier structures in scale, setback, materials, and workmanship. The majority of neighborhood residents recognize the special character of the area and desire its continued preservation.

As Miami's population expanded during the late 1920s and early 1920s, new subdivisions reached northward along Biscayne Bay. In 1922, a large, undeveloped bayfront tract near the northern city limits was platted. Called Bay Shore, this area was subdivided by the Bay Shore Investment Company and was the first of three phases that would be developed by the company between 1922 and 1924.

==== Architecture of Morningside ====
Houses constructed in the Morningside Historic District reflect the eclecticism popular in the early twentieth century. The earlier buildings in the district are predominantly Mediterranean Revival in style, while structures built in the 1930s and early 1940s are frequently Art Deco. Outstanding examples of both styles are found here. Morningside also features a large number of masonry vernacular buildings that frequently utilize elements of several styles. An unusual Tudor Revival style house and one of the city's best examples of Mission style architecture add to the area's architectural diversity.

==== Demographics of Morningside ====
As of 2000, the population of Morningside was 1,074 people. The racial makeup of Morningside was 14.90% Hispanic or Latino of any race, 28.49% Black or African American, and 55.21% White (non-Hispanic).

=== Bay Point ===
Bay Point is a sub-neighborhood in the Upper East Side neighborhood. It is a gated community stretching from NE 41st Street to NE 50th Street alongside Biscayne Boulevard. The neighborhood streets are privately owned by the households and access to the roads and waterways are restricted to the residents (and their guests), of which there are approximately 250. To maintain the streets and the neighborhood's 24-hour security, all residents must pay neighborhood dues that can total approximately $2,200 per year. As of 2000, the population of Bay Point was 1,378 people. The racial makeup of Baypoint was 49.20% Hispanic or Latino of any race, 5.2% Black or African American, and 36.7% White (non-Hispanic).

=== Bayside Historic District ===
The Bayside Historic District is a sub-neighborhood of the Upper East Side. The area is generally bounded by NE 72nd Street and N.E. 72nd Terrace on the north; Biscayne Bay on the east; NE 67th Street on the south; and Biscayne Boulevard to the west.

==== History of Bayside ====
The Bayside Historic District reflects the formative years of the early 1900s through the mid-1940s. Once a part of the pioneer settlement of Lemon City, Bayside contains the oldest intact community in Northeast Miami, as well as one of this area's last remaining bayfront estates. Bayside has four distinct subdivisions which were platted between 1909 and 1925, although the area itself was first settled in the late nineteenth century. These subdivisions include Elmira (N.E. 68th Street and N.E. 67th Street), which was platted in 1909; Acadia (N.E. 70th Street), which was platted in 1915; Baywood (N.E. 69th Street and the south side of N.E. 71st Street), which was platted in 1921 and added to in 1924; and Washington Place (N.E. 72nd Street and the north side of N.E. 71st Street), which was platted in 1925.

In 1909, William B. and Fred C. Miller (not related) subdivided a seven-acre (2.8 ha) bayfront lot on today's N.E. 68th Street. The Millers had come to Florida in the late 1880s from Elmira, New York and had developed Elmira Farms near Arch Creek. Their new subdivision was named Elmira, and oolitic limestone gates announced the entrance to the new community.

While much of what was Lemon City has been engulfed by later developments, Elmira has remained virtually intact. Although many of its houses have deteriorated, and newer buildings have been added, the street retains much of its early character. Elmira is characterized by its excellent collection of Frame Vernacular buildings, many of which were inspired by Northern architectural styles. The Elmira Club at 742 N.E. 68th Street, for example, has Dutch Colonial Revival influences, while other houses display classical details. The majority of houses were constructed in the 1910s.

The Acadia subdivision was platted in 1915 by the Realty Securities Corporation and George E. Merrick. Although the subdivision evokes the memory of Longfellow with such names as Acadian Way, Evangeline Circle, Tropical Trail, and Druid Walk, the houses developed here are distinctly Mediterranean Revival in influence. This is due perhaps to the fact that only two houses were constructed prior to 1925. Development took off during the Boom years of the mid-1920s, however, when Wykoff and Estes Builders constructed an outstanding cluster of large, two-story Mediterranean Revival style houses near the eastern end of NE 70th Street.

The last subdivision to be subdivided was Washington Place, which was also developed between 1925 and the mid-1940s. Samuel J. Prescott, who platted the subdivision in 1925, had constructed his own winter home at 7101 N.E. 10th Avenue some years before. The house remains today as one of the last intact bayfront estates in Northeast Miami. The estate once featured a recreational golf course for residents and guests. Prescott was founder of the firm of Samuel J. Prescott Co., Inc., building contractors, which developed several significant buildings in downtown Washington, D.C. Prescott was chairman of the board of the Second National Bank of Washington, D.C., president of the Master Builders Association, the Builders and Manufacturers Exchange, and the Prescott Farms Company of New Hampshire.

The Bayside Historic District remains today as an intact, cohesive neighborhood. Despite the number of post-1941 buildings, Bayside retains a high level of historic and architectural integrity.

== Demographics ==
The Upper East Side has a population of 15,056 of different ethnicities and races that includes high, middle and low income residents. Biscayne Boulevard is the central spine of this neighborhood. The neighborhood like the rest of Miami is quickly becoming composed mostly of artistic and bright colored homes and condos. The area has some of the highest crime rates in Miami for an area that has a substantial amount of middle- and high-income residents.

As of 2010, The Upper Eastside had a population of 15,056 residents, with 6,263 households, and 3,167 families residing in the neighborhood. The median household income was $35,196.16. The racial makeup of the neighborhood was 37.26% Hispanic or Latino of any race, 29.65% Black or African American, 28.68% White (non-Hispanic), and 4.41% Other races (non-Hispanic).

== MiMo Historic District ==
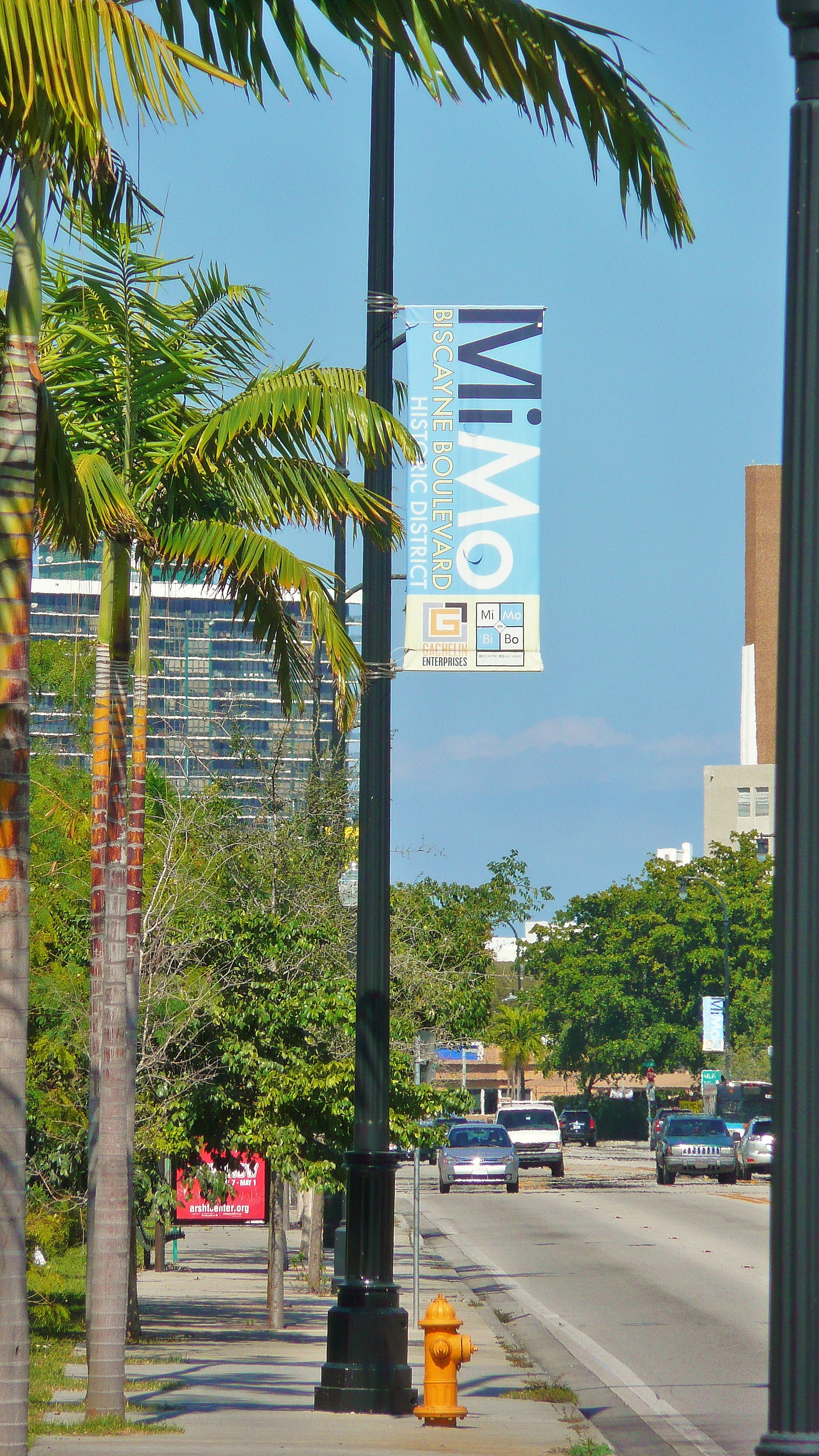
MiMo District sign

Today, the area along Biscayne Boulevard is the designated MiMo Architecture Biscayne Boulevard Historic District or also known as "MiMo on BiBo", for "Miami Modern on Biscayne Boulevard". MiMo Historic District runs roughly from 50th Street to 77th Street along Biscayne Boulevard, although MiMo can be found heavily in the Miami Design District and Midtown. Many annual festivals are held to promote MiMo architecture, such as "Cinco de MiMo" a play on "Cinco de Mayo" in early May.

Biscayne Boulevard throughout the Upper East Side fell to urban decay after the 1980s, and experienced increased crime, prostitution and drug dealings. In the 2000s, preservation efforts began to bring development interest into the neighborhood, and Biscayne Boulevard began to improve. Today, the boulevard is in a fast upwards transition along with many other nearby neighborhoods such as the Design District, Wynwood and Edgewater, with strong preservation efforts to preserve the Miami Modern architecture.

== Zoning and public projects ==
Under pressure from residents to keep undesirably large buildings out, The Miami City Commission considered new building codes and a 180-day moratorium on February 26 of 2007. With many homes built in the late 1920s, the Upper Eastside encompasses some of Miami's oldest neighborhoods and residents desire to keep it that way. The proposed codes were looser on distance to low-density areas but stricter on building height.

A beautification and landscape project was recently completed on Biscayne Boulevard and Legion Park and Eaton Park recently received improvements such as new playground equipment. Construction on new Little River Canal and efforts to fight crime are currently being worked on.

== Education ==
Miami-Dade County Public Schools operates area public schools:

- Morningside K-8 Academy
- Phyllis R. Miller Elementary School

The Archdiocese of Miami operates:

- Archbishop Curley-Notre Dame High School, private/Catholic (closed)

Other private schools in the Upper East Side include:

- Morningside Montessori School
- The Cushman School

=== Libraries ===
Miami-Dade Public Library operates area public libraries:

- Lemon City Library

== Parks ==
- Morningside Park
- Legion Park
- Baywood Park
- Belle Meade Mini Park
- Military Trail Park
- North Shorecrest Park
- Manatee Bend Park

== See also ==
- Neighborhoods in Miami
- MiMo Architecture
