= Archbishop Curley-Notre Dame High School =

Archbishop Curley Notre-Dame High School
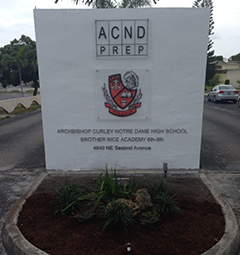
- Main entrance to ACND Prep

Location
- 4949 NE 2nd Avenue; Buena Vista, Miami, (Miami-Dade), Florida 33137; United States; 25°49′15″N 80°11′29″W

Information
- Type: Private, Coeducational
- Religious affiliation: Christian
- Denomination: Roman Catholic
- Established: 1953 (as two separate schools for boys and girls); 1981 (as Archbishop Curley-Notre Dame High School)
- Founder: Edmund Ignacious Rice
- Closed: 2017
- Oversight: Congregation of Christian Brothers
- Dean: Terry Williams
- Principal: Douglas Romanik
- Head of school: Edmund Rice
- Grades: 6-12
- Campus size: 16 acres (65,000 m^{2})
- Colors: Orange, Yellow, Green, blue, and purple
- Mascot: Knight
- Team name: Curley Knights
- Accreditation: Southern Association of Colleges and Schools
- USNWR ranking: 1
- National ranking: 420
- Newspaper: Knight Times
- Yearbook: The Lance
- Athletic Director: Coach Dedee Pierre
- Website: www.acnd.net

Archbishop Curley-Notre Dame High School was a private, Roman Catholic high school in the Buena Vista neighborhood of Miami, Florida, United States. It was located in and operated by the Roman Catholic Archdiocese of Miami.

On September 27, 2016, the Archdiocese of Miami announced that, due to continued dwindling enrollment, the school would close in August 2017. The school was merged with Monsignor Edward Pace High School, in Miami Gardens, at the start of the 2017–2018 academic year.

== History ==
In 1953, the Roman Catholic Diocese of Saint Augustine (which, on October 7, 1958, became the Roman Catholic Diocese of Miami, under Bishop Joseph Patrick Hurley) created two new Catholic high schools. Archbishop Curley High School (for boys) and Notre Dame Academy (for girls), were founded in 1953, in Miami, Florida. Archbishop Curley High School was initially administered by diocesan priests from 1953 to 1959, followed by the Congregation of the Brothers of the Holy Cross from 1960 to 1970, and again by diocesan priests from 1970 until 1985. Notre Dame Academy was originally administered by the Sisters of Saint Joseph of Saint Augustine from 1953 to 1959. From 1960 to 1981 the Sisters, Servants of the Immaculate Heart of Mary administered Notre Dame Academy.

The two schools merged in 1981 onto the Archbishop Curley High School campus to form coeducational Archbishop Curley-Notre Dame High School. From 1985 the school was administered by the Congregation of Christian Brothers.

At the start of the 1960–61 school year, five black students left all-black Holy Redeemer, encouraged to do so by nuns. Three male students enrolled at Archbishop Curley, and two female students enrolled at Notre Dame.

== Athletics ==
Inside the Knights huddle.

Sports by season:

- Fall
  - Cheer Leading
  - Cross Country (coed)
  - Football
  - Volleyball
  - Golf
- Winter
  - Basketball (boys)
  - Basketball (girls)
  - Cheer Leading
  - Soccer (boys)
  - Soccer (girls)
  - Wrestling
- Spring
  - Baseball
  - Softball
  - Tennis (boys)
  - Tennis (girls)
  - Track & Field (coed)

== Notable alumni ==
- Bobby Allison, former NASCAR driver
- Cecilia Altonaga, U.S. District Court judge
- Chris Antonopoulos, former professional soccer player, Fort Lauderdale Strikers and United States men's national beach soccer team
- Fran Curci, former head football coach, University of Miami and University of Kentucky
- Charley Diamond, former professional player, BC Lions and Kansas City Chiefs
- Bill Frohbose, former professional football player, Detroit Lions
- Dudley Hart, professional golfer
- Mark Hurd, former co-CEO Oracle, and former chairman, CEO, and President, Hewlett Packard
- Carroll Williams, former professional football player, Canadian Football League
- Betty Wright, Grammy-winning soul and R&B singer-songwriter
