= West Flagler =

- Neighborhood of Miami
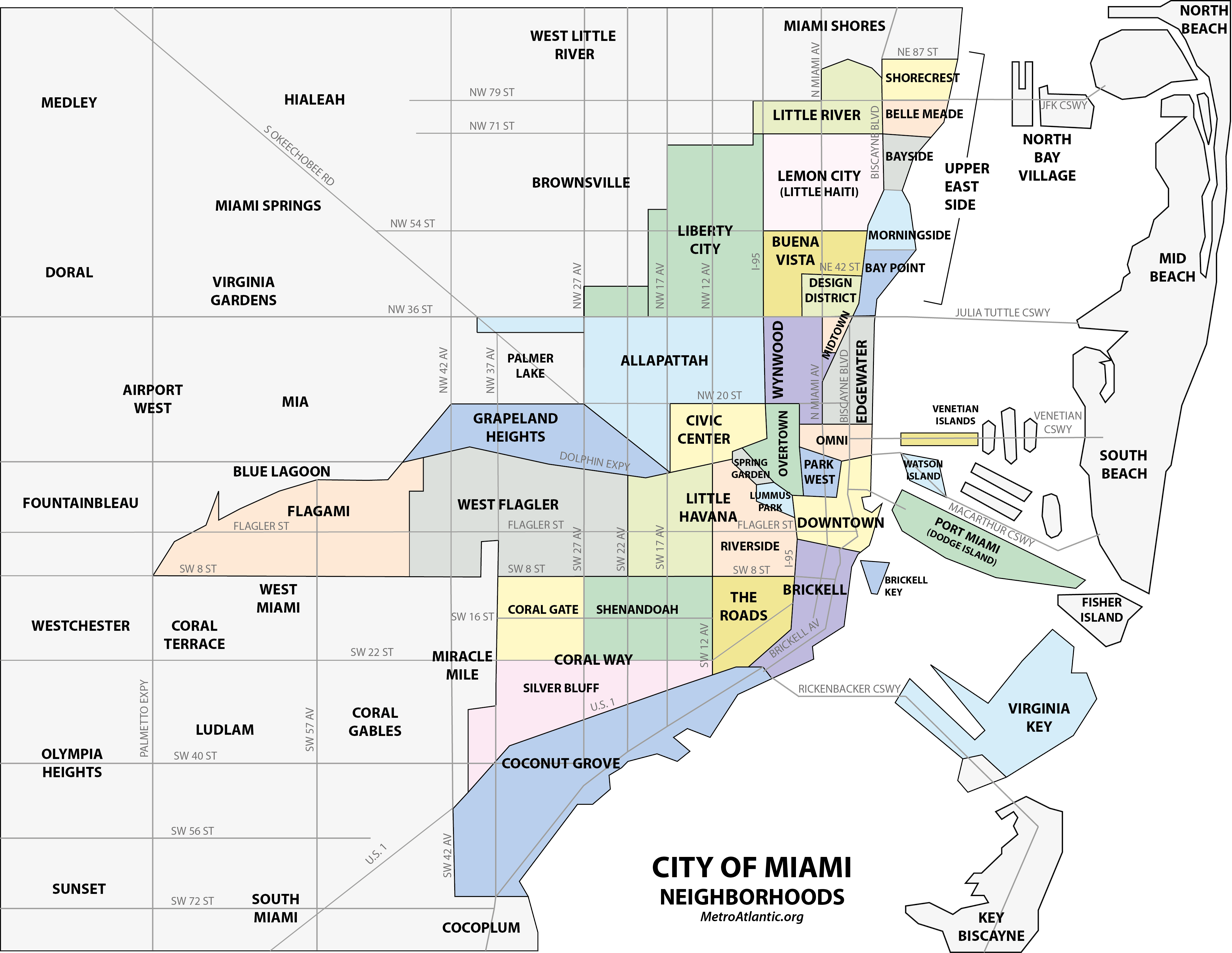
- West Flagler neighborhood within the City of Miami
- Coordinates: 25.77462°N 80.242853°W
- Country: United States
- State: Florida
- County: Miami-Dade County
- City: Miami

Population (2010)
  - Total: 31,407
  - Density: 11,468.2/sq mi (4,427.9/km^{2})
- Time zone: UTC-05 (EST)
- ZIP Code: 33125, 33135
- Area codes: 305, 786

West Flagler (formerly West Little Havana) is a neighborhood in Miami, Florida, United States, bisected by Flagler Street. It is roughly located north of the Tamiami Trail (US 41/South Eighth Street) and south of North Seventh Street, between State Road 9 (West 27th Avenue) to the east and LeJeune Road (West 42nd Avenue) to the west.

== Demographics ==
In the 2010 U.S. Census, West Flagler had a population of 31,407 with a population density of 11,468.2 residents per square mile.

As of 2000, West Flagler had a population of 41,012 residents, with 14,810 households, and 10,490 families residing in the neighborhood. The median household income was $26,176.70. The racial makeup of the neighborhood was 90.73% Hispanic or Latino of any race, 1.15% Black or African American (non-Hispanic), 7.61% White (non-Hispanic), and 0.49% Other races (non-Hispanic).

== See also ==
- West Flagler Library
- Neighborhoods in Miami
