= Lummus Park =

Lummus Park may refer to:

- Lummus Park Historic District, a neighborhood in Downtown Miami
- Lummus Park, Miami, the park in Lummus Park Historic District
- Lummus Park, Miami Beach, a park in South Beach
