= Lummus =

Lummus may refer to:

- J. E. Lummus and J. N. Lummus, bankers who moved to Miami in 1895
- Henry T. Lummus (1876–1960), associate justice of the Massachusetts Supreme Judicial Court
- Lummus Company, manufacturer of cotton gins, Savannah Georgia
- Lummus Global, a company of Chicago Bridge & Iron Company
- Lummus Island, one of the three islands composing Dodge Island in Miami
- Lummus Park, Miami Beach, in South Beach
- Lummus Park, Miami, in Lummus Park Historic District
- Lummus Park Historic District, a neighborhood in Downtown Miami
