= National Weather Service Miami, Florida =

NWS Forecast Office serving Miami, southeast Florida

The National Weather Service Miami, Florida county warning area/area of responsibility.

The National Weather Service Miami, Florida is a local weather forecast office of the National Weather Service (NWS) that serves six counties in South Florida – Broward, Collier, Glades, Hendry, Miami-Dade, and Palm Beach – as well as the mainland portion of Monroe County. This office was originally established in 1879 as a Signal Corps station near the Jupiter Inlet Light, before becoming a Weather Bureau Office (WBO) in 1891. The WBO at Jupiter was moved southward to Miami in 1911, due to the city's rapidly growing population. In 1930, a separate Weather Bureau Airport Station (WBAS) was established at the Miami Municipal Airport. The WBAS was later moved to the Miami International Airport in 1942 and remained there until ceasing operations in 1975.

Under the leadership of Grady Norton, the joint hurricane warning service, which was a predecessor to the National Hurricane Center, was moved from the WBO Jacksonville to the WBO Miami in 1943. The Weather Bureau was renamed the National Weather Service in October 1970. Thus, WBO Miami became NWS Miami. As part of an organizational restructuring plan in the 1990s, an NWS office in West Palm Beach was merged with NWS Miami. Since 1995, this office of the NWS has been located on the campus of Florida International University and adjacent to the National Hurricane Center.

== History ==
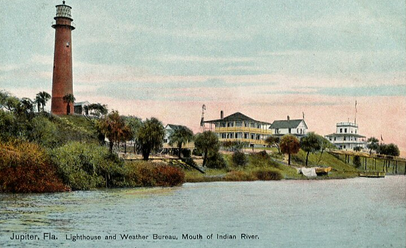
The Jupiter Inlet Light complex in 1908. The Weather Bureau is on the far right

After President Ulysses S. Grant signed a joint resolution of Congress in 1870 establishing a weather service within the United States Army, the Signal Corps opened 22 observation stations. In July 1879, such a facility was founded at the Jupiter Inlet near the lighthouse. Farther south, other people in the Miami area kept weather records, including W. H. Hunt, a state senator who represented Brevard and Dade counties (they adjoined at the time), and Ephraim Sturtevant, the father of Julia Tuttle, who was known as the "Mother of Miami". In 1890, President Benjamin Harrison requested that Congress create the Weather Bureau and transfer it to the Department of Agriculture. Less than a year later, the signal station became the Weather Bureau Office (WBO) Jupiter. During the winter of 1894–1895, WBO Jupiter recorded two severe freezes, with low temperatures of 24 and 27 °F (−4 and −3 °C) on December 29 and February 9, respectively. As a result, Henry Flagler decided to extend the Florida East Coast Railway southward to Miami from West Palm Beach.

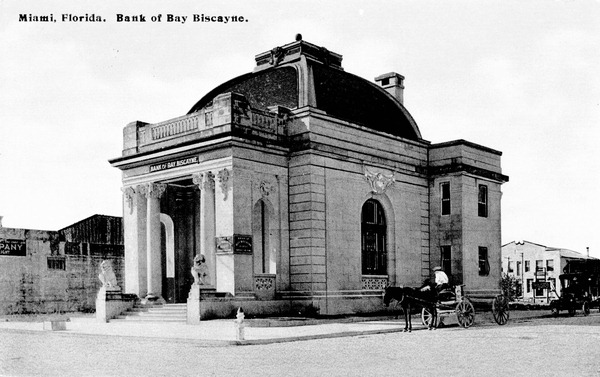
The Bank of Bay Biscayne Building, which housed the Weather Bureau Office (WBO) Miami from 1911 to 1914

Due to Miami's rapidly growing population in the early 20th century, the WBO in Jupiter closed in May 1911 and moved to the city about a month later. Located at the Bank of Bay Biscayne Building in Miami, a 40-foot (12 m) steel tower was constructed on the roof of the building to record wind direction and velocity. In August 1914, the WBO Miami was moved to the Federal Building located at Northeast 1st Street and 1st Street.

In October 1944, the Weather Bureau opened a part-time office at Palm Beach Air Force Base (modern-day Palm Beach International Airport) in West Palm Beach. The office became full-time in November 1945 and was known as NWS West Palm Beach.

Hurricane Andrew made landfall in southern Miami-Dade County on August 24, 1992. Overnight, strong winds blew the WSR-57 radar off the roof. The NWS offices in Melbourne, Tampa, and West Palm Beach all provided forecasting issuance and backup warnings. The new radar, NEXRAD, was installed in April 1993 near the Miami MetroZoo, ahead of schedule. NEXRAD was commissioned on April 20, 1995. The next month, NWS Miami and the NHC moved to the campus of Florida International University. As part of an organizational restructuring plan in the 1990s, NWS West Palm Beach merged with NWS Miami in 1993. In 1997, there was a proposal to merge NWS Key West into NWS Miami. However, by March 1998, after consideration from Congress and the NWS headquarters, it was decided that NWS Key West would remain a separate office.

== Directors ==
The following are the directors of NWS Miami since its establishment in 1879. There was no director prior to 1888.

United States Signal Service (1888–1891)

Name	Year(s)
Sgt. Henry Pennywitt	1888
Pvt. M. W. Lichty	1888–1891

Weather Bureau Office, Jupiter, Florida (1891–1911)

Name	Year(s)
Alexander J. Mitchell	1891–1894
P. J. O'Brien	1894
James W. Cronk	1894–1899
C. J. Doherty	1899
H. P. Hardin	1899–1911

Weather Bureau Office, Miami, Florida (1911–1970)

Name	Year(s)
Richard W. Gray	1911–1935
Ernest Carson	1935-1943
Grady Norton	1943–1954
Walter R. Davis	1954–1955
Gordon E. Dunn	1955–1967
Robert H. Simpson	1967–1970

National Weather Service, Miami, Florida (1970–present)

Name	Year(s)
Paul J. Hebert	1984–1998
Russell L. Pfost	1998–2010
Dr. Pablo Santos	2010–2023
Robert Molleda	2024-Present

== NOAA Weather Radio ==
The National Weather Service Miami, Florida forecast office provides programming for six NOAA Weather Radio stations in South Florida.

City of license	Call sign	Frequency (MHz)
Miami	KHB34	162.550 MHz
Miami (Spanish)	WZ2531	162.500 MHz
Princeton	WNG663	162.425 MHz
West Palm Beach	KEC50	162.475 MHz
Naples	WWG92	162.525 MHz
Belle Glade	WXM58	162.400 MHz
