= Senator Sturtevant =

Senator Sturtevant may refer to:

- Ephraim Sturtevant (1803–1881), Florida State Senate
- Glen Sturtevant (born 1982), Virginia State Senate
