= Lummus Park Historic District =

Neighborhood of Miami in Miami-Dade County, Florida, United States

Lummus Park
- Neighborhood of Miami
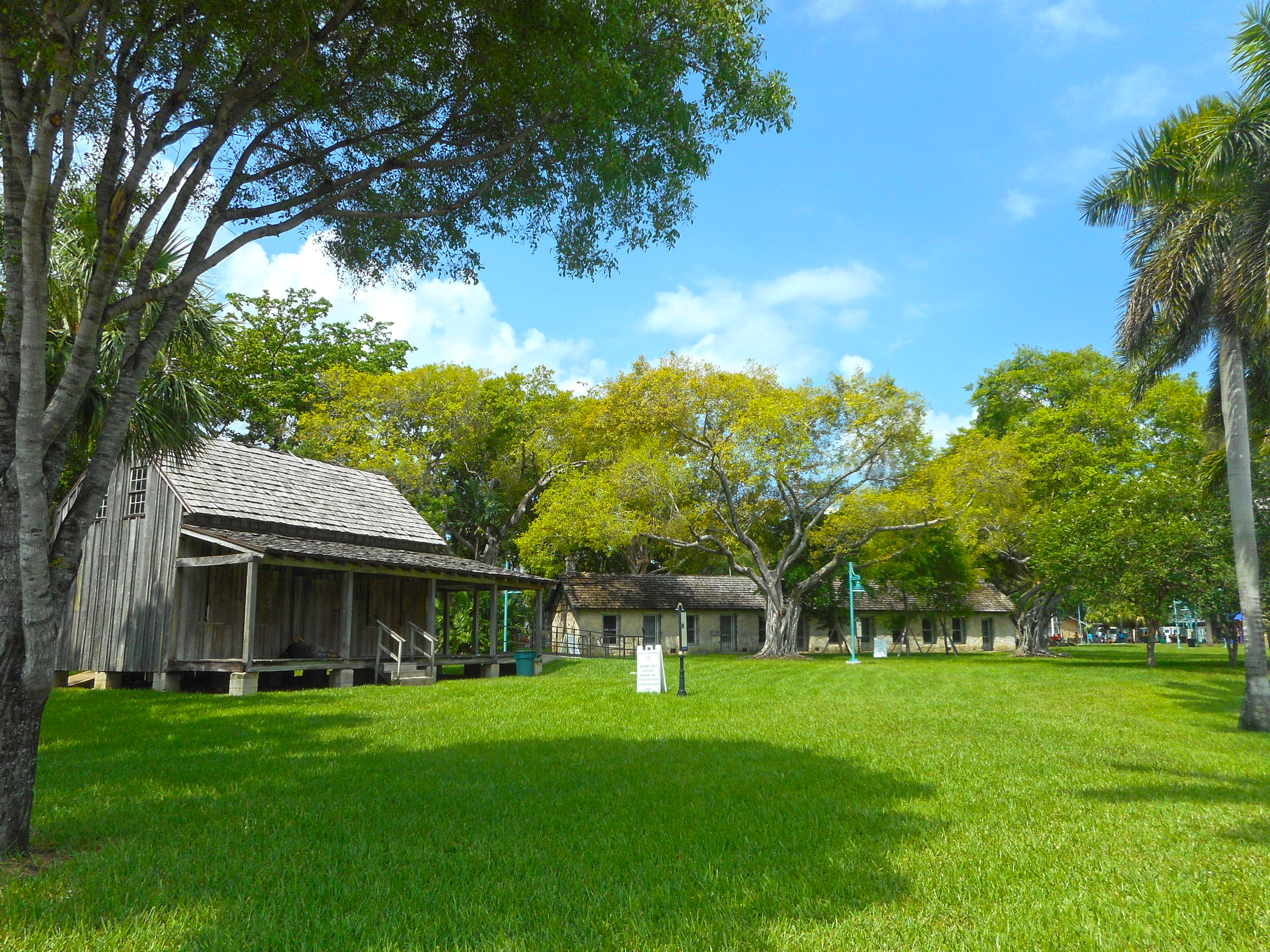
- Wagner House and Fort Dallas barracks
- Nickname: Lummus
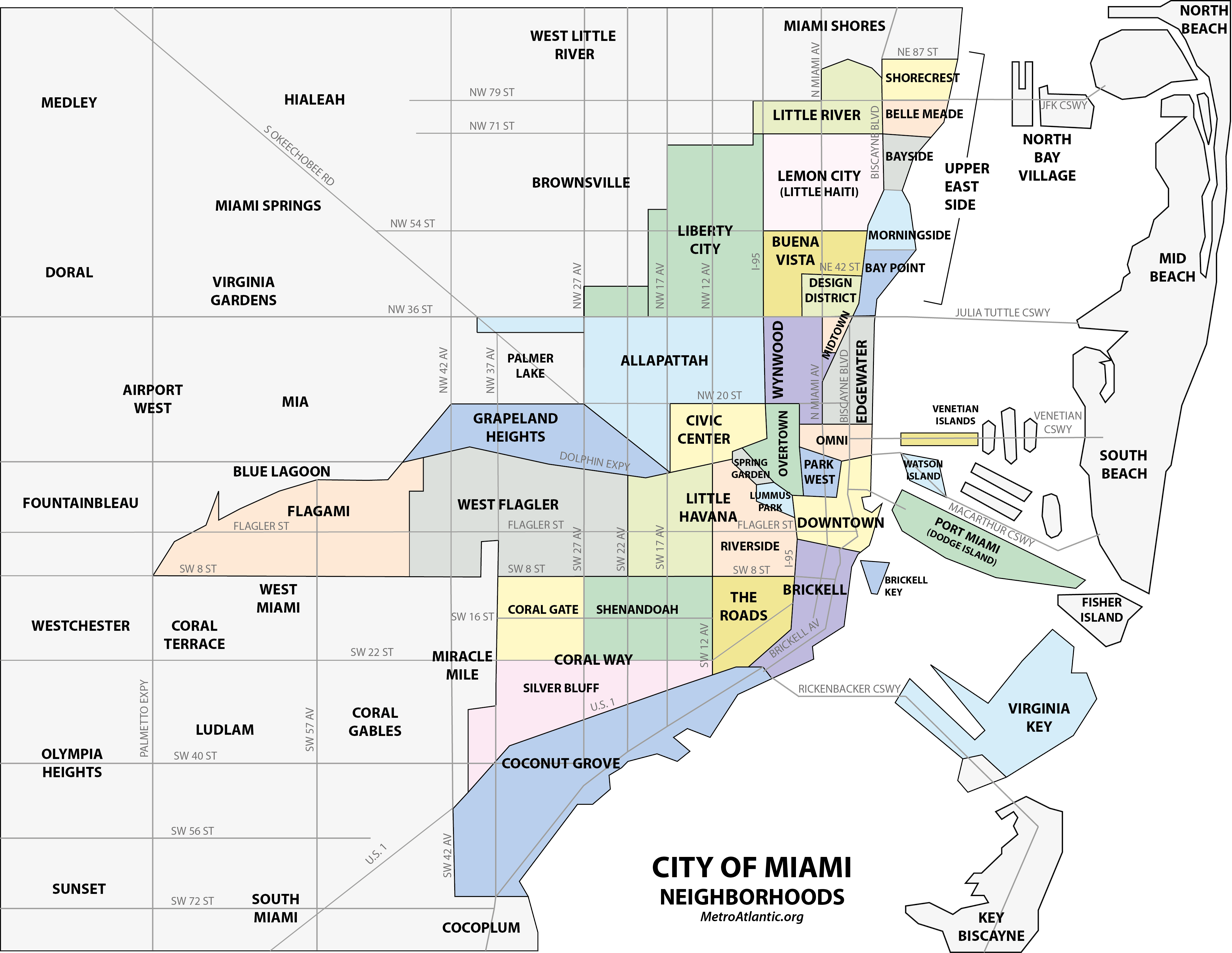
- Lummus Park neighborhood within the City of Miami
- Coordinates: 25°46′37″N 80°12′5″W
- Country: United States
- State: Florida
- County: Miami-Dade County
- City: City of Miami
- Incorporated: 1896
- Settled: 1909

Government
  - City of Miami Commissioner: Keon Hardemon
  - Miami-Dade Commissioners: Audrey Edmonson
  - House of Representatives: Cynthia Stafford (D)
  - State Senate: Larcenia Bullard (D)
  - U.S. House: Frederica Wilson (D)

Population (2010)
  - Total: 3,027
  - Density: 9,532/sq mi (3,680/km^{2})
- Time zone: UTC-05 (EST)
- ZIP Code: 33136
- Area codes: 305, 786

- Lummus Park Historic District
- U.S. National Register of Historic Places
- U.S. Historic district
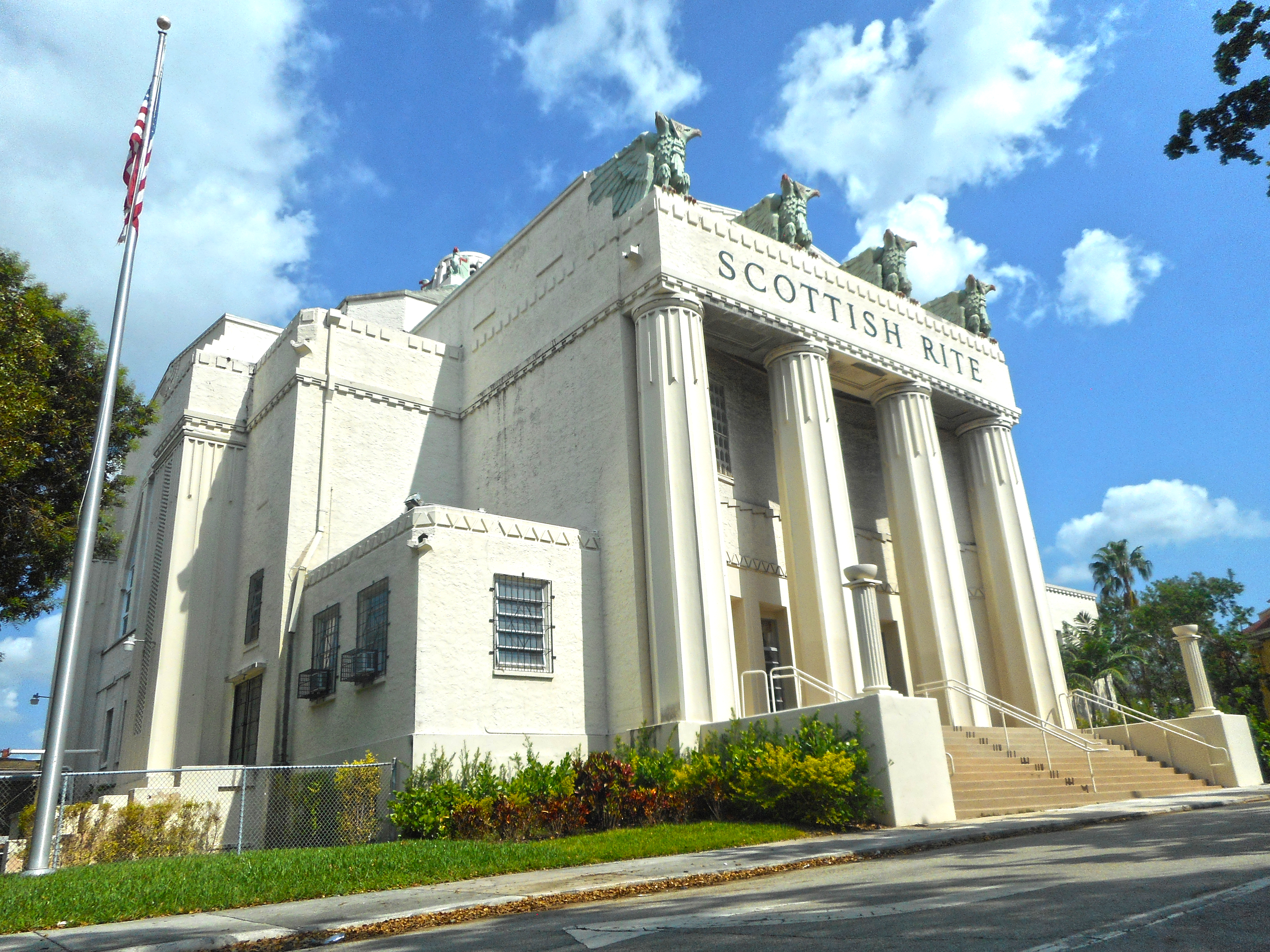
- Scottish Rite Temple, established in 1916, and built in 1924

- Location within Miami Location within Florida Location within the United States
- Location: Miami, Florida United States
- Coordinates: 25°46′37″N 80°12′5″W
- NRHP reference No.: 06000952
- Added to NRHP: October 25, 2006

The Lummus Park Historic District or simply Lummus Park, is on the National Register of Historic Places and a locally historic designated district in Miami, Florida. It is roughly bound by Northwest Fifth Street to the north, Flagler Street to the south, Northwest Third Avenue to the east, and the Miami River to the west. On October 25, 2006, it was added to the U.S. National Register of Historic Places. Lummus Park has some of the oldest structures in Miami, and over the decades, has been able to retain a large part of its early pioneer character.

== History ==
Lummus Park, was created in 1909, as one of Miami's first open, green spaces. It was first named City Park and later named after the notable Miami pioneers, the Lummus brothers (J.E. Lummus and J.N. Lummus).The opening of the park in 1909, spurred development in the area, and today, most of the building around the park were built before 1926. The neighborhood has a variety of Mediterranean Revival, Frame, and Masonry Vernacular styles of architecture, and is home to Miami's old Scottish Rite Temple.

Lummus Park represents development in Miami before the phenomenal growth of the Florida land boom of the 1920s. The Lummus Park area was platted in 1909, following the creation of Lummus Park in 1909. The park was the catalyst for the development of the surrounding area into a residential neighborhood. The land on which the neighborhood is located was originally owned by the Model Land Company, Henry Flagler's real estate company. The extant buildings and structures, such as the Scottish Rite Temple, are illustrative of the growth patterns in Miami, where areas closest to the water and downtown developed early in the history of the city.

The district is also significant as one of the last remaining residential neighborhood in close proximity to downtown Miami. Over the years, the historic district has been separated from the rest of downtown through the construction of I-95 to the east of the neighborhood and the construction of large high-rise structures on the surrounding properties.

Two of the buildings situated within Lummus Park – Fort Dallas, and the William Wagner House – are significant as the last remaining structures associated with Miami's pioneer history. Both structures have been moved to their present site because they were threatened with demolition and there was no other alternative to assure their preservation. The erection of Fort Dallas at Lummus Park presents a combination of a reconstruction and moved structure. The 1920s endeavor to save the structure heralded the city's first historic preservation effort. This was quite a civic undertaking, as the city was just more than three decades old when the preservation effort began.

== Architecture of Lummus Park ==
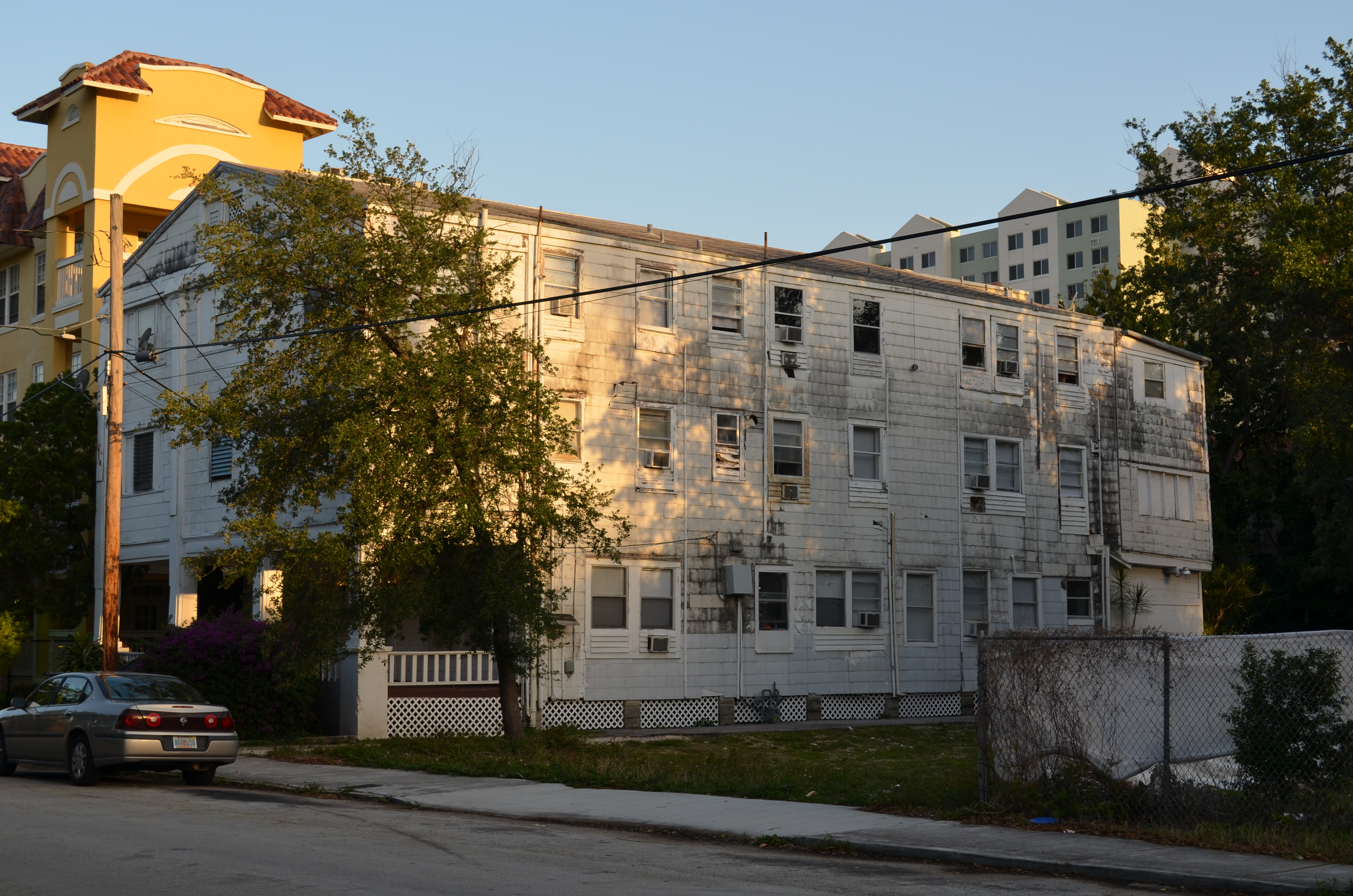
Large wooden frame building still in residential use.

Additionally, this neighborhood maintains importance because it exemplifies the architecture of the early part of the twentieth century. The remaining Mediterranean Revival and Frame and Masonry Vernacular residences and buildings illustrate the building styles and types that were once prevalent throughout downtown Miami, primarily in the 1910s and 1920s. The simple frame residences and early masonry apartment buildings represent the variety of residential building types that once flourished within Downtown Miami, but only the buildings comprising the historic district survive as a small remnant. The inclusion of the park, its recreational buildings, the Trinity CME Church, and the Scottish Rite Temple serve to recall the vitality of this neighborhood and serve as anchors to the district boundaries.

The buildings of Lummus Park represent the diversity of architectural styling that characterized early construction trends in Miami. In addition to the two pioneer-era structures, there are various examples of Frame Vernacular residences which represent an attempt to erect moderately-priced housing quickly, using locally available construction materials. The residences and apartment buildings executed in this regional style were influenced by other local buildings as well as the sub-tropical Miami climate. The presence of the Mediterranean Revival style in the neighborhood represents the firm establishment of a vernacular style incorporating architectural elements derived from countries with similar climate and proximity to water. The unique architecture of the Scottish Rite Temple makes this building a highly important architectural landmark in the city.

== Individually designated structures ==
- Fort Dallas, the earliest surviving example of native limestone construction in Miami and the only remaining structure associated with Miami's early military history.
- William Wagner House, moved in 1979 to its present site and was the home of one of Miami's leading pioneer citizens, the man responsible for erecting the first church in Miami-Dade County, and its structure represents a unique example of braced frame construction in the area.
- Scottish Rite Temple

== Transportation ==
Lummus Park is served by Metrobus throughout the area, and by the Miami Metrorail at:

- Government Center (NW 1st Street and NW 1st Avenue)

== Gallery ==
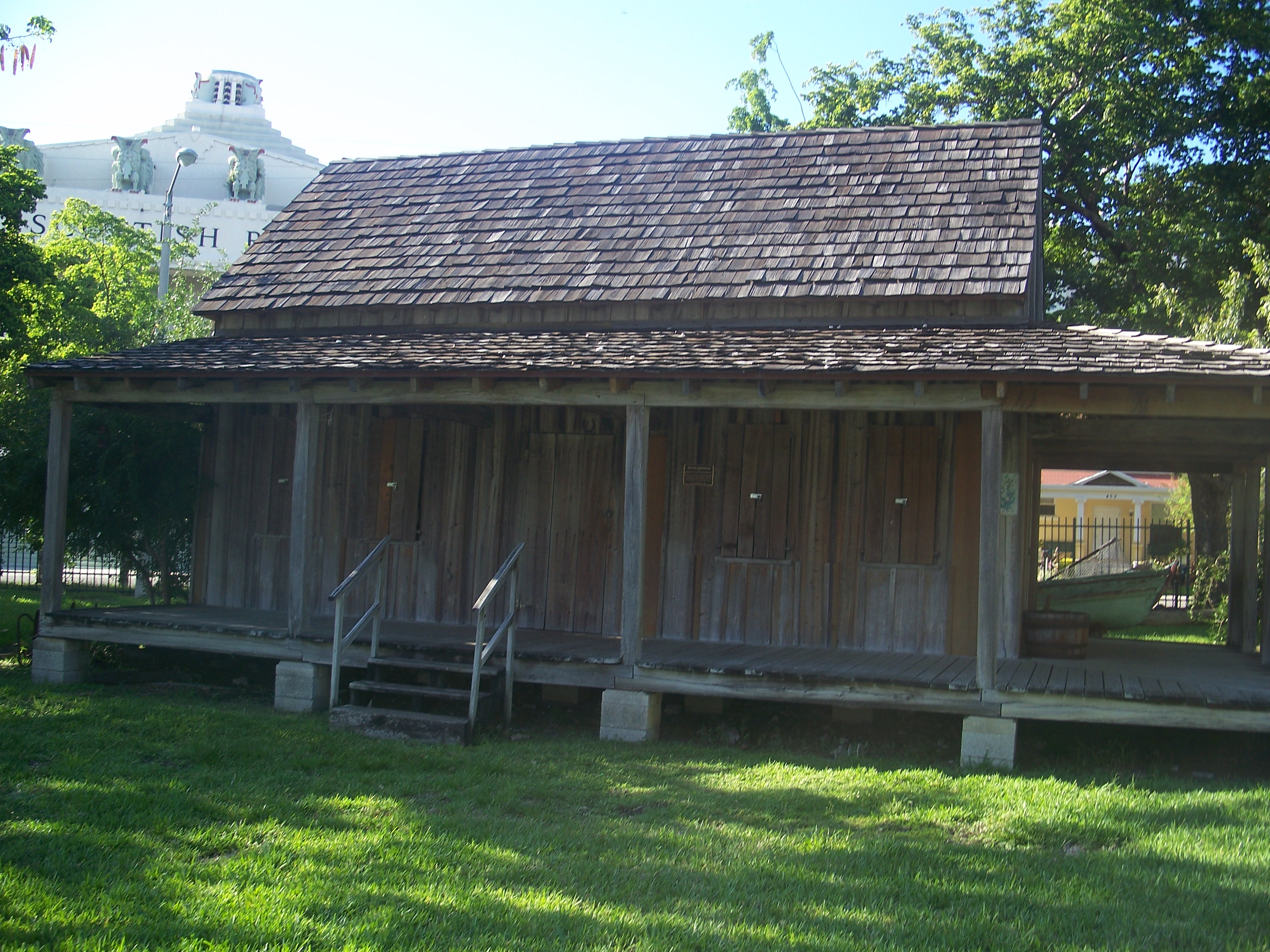
Wagner Homestead in Lummus Park

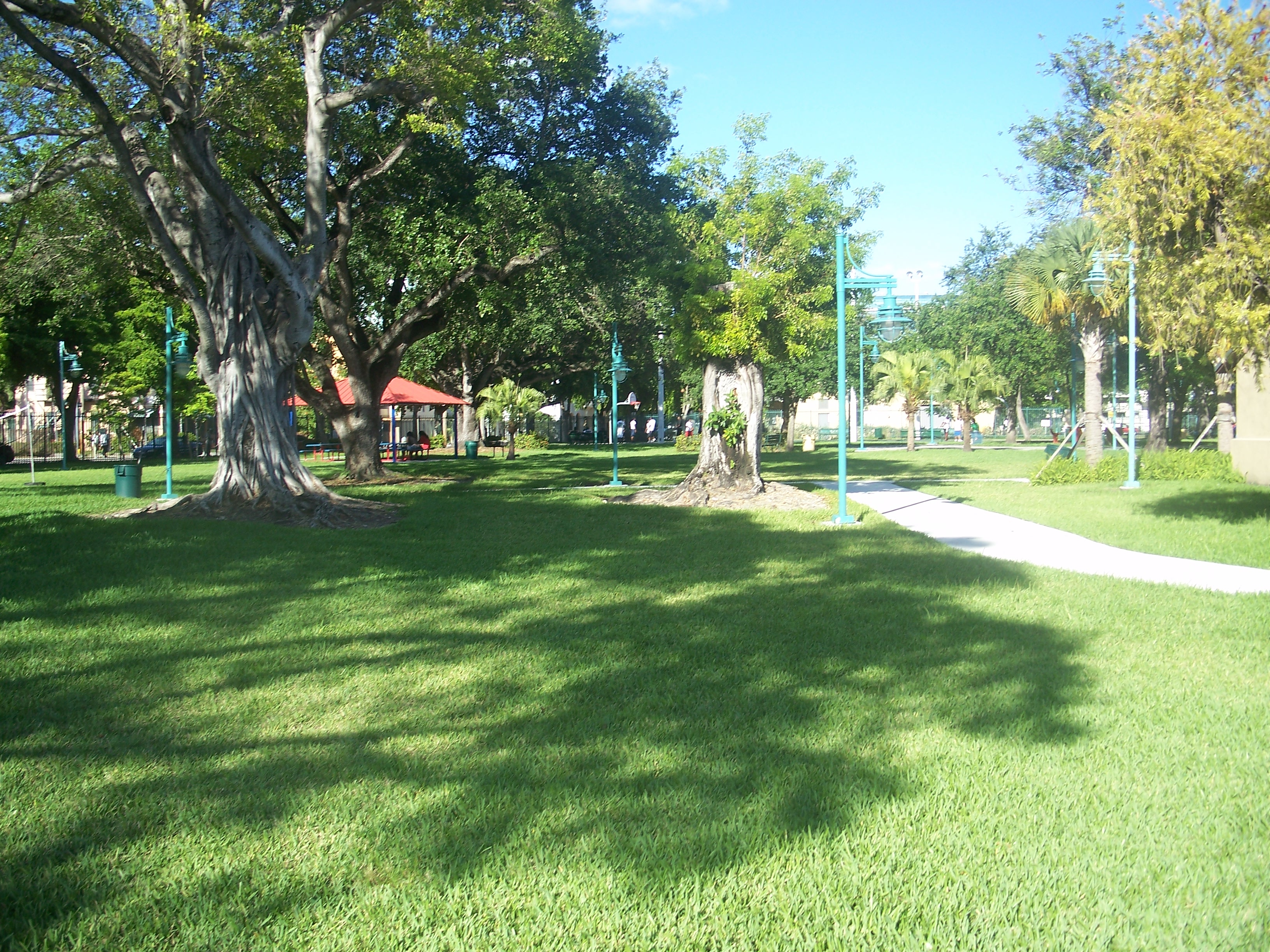
Lummus Park

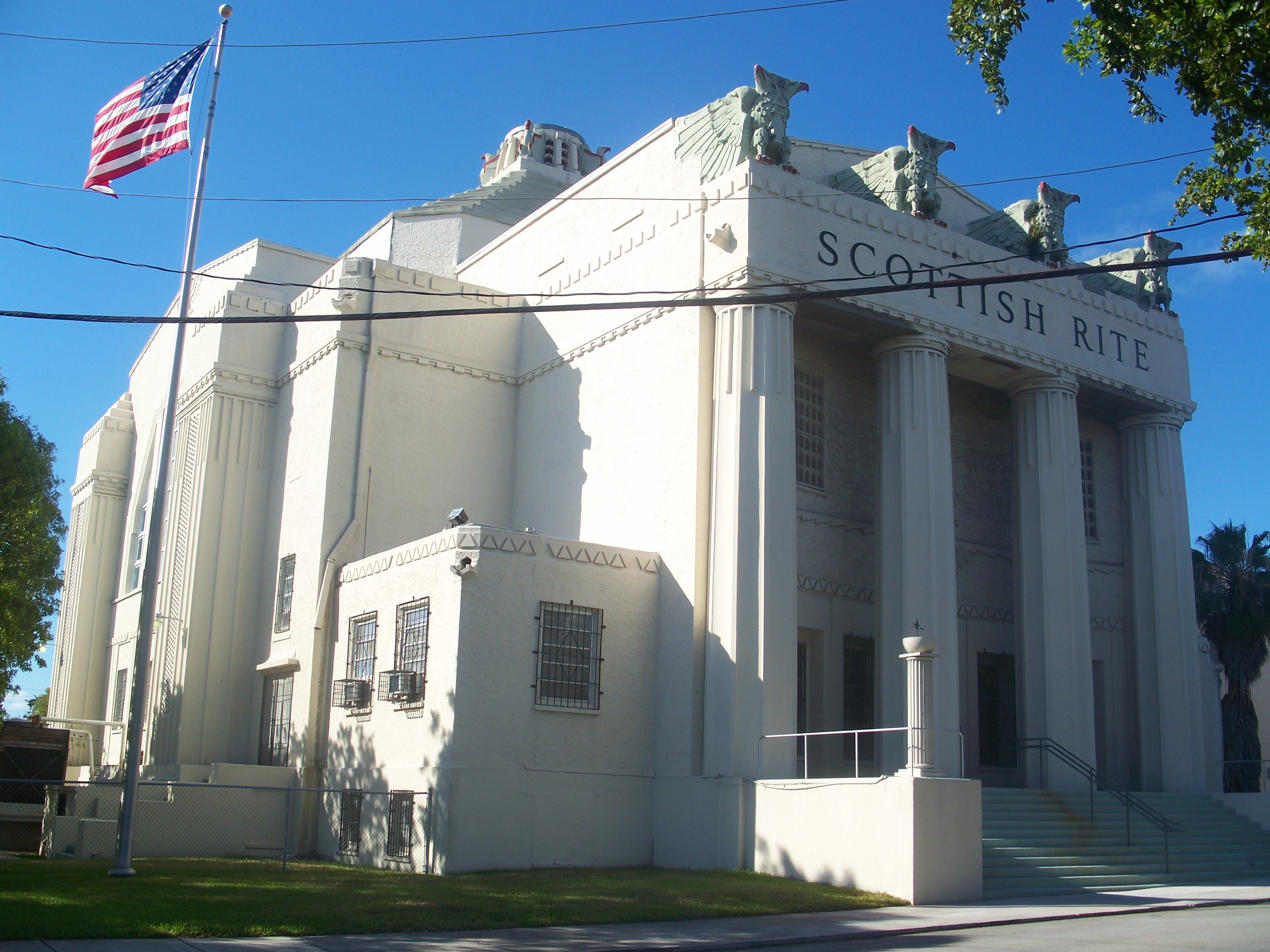
Scottish Rite Temple, next to the park, built in 1924

== See also ==
- Lummus Park, Miami
- Downtown Miami Historic District
- National Register of Historic Places listings in Miami, Florida
- J.E. Lummus
- J.N. Lummus
