= J. E. Lummus =

Miami banker and mayor

James E. Lummus

2nd Mayor of Miami
- In office November 1900 – November 1903
- Preceded by: John B Reilly
- Succeeded by: John Sewell

Personal details
- Born: December 23, 1867
- Died: July 1, 1955 (aged 87) Miami, Florida, US
- Resting place: Woodlawn Park Miami
- Spouse: Georgie Brown Lummus
- Children: 1

James Edward 'J.E.' Lummus (December 23, 1867 – July 1, 1955) was a banker, businessman and second Mayor of the City of Miami.

== Early life ==
J.E. Lummus and his brother J.N. Lummus were the sons of a Confederate Civil War veteran who moved the family to Levy County Florida after the war. Lummus attended Eastman's Business College in Poughkeepsie, New York, from which he graduated in 1888. Returning to Bronson, Levy County, he managed a mercantile store of his own. He also formed a partnership with his uncle in a second general merchandise business.

== Miami Pioneers ==
The Lummus brothers moved to the Miami area with the development of the railroad, around 1896. J.E. owned a general store in Miami until about 1908 when he sold the business and began investing in real estate and banking.

In the early days of Miami, the Lummus brothers were both bank presidents. J.E. Lummus was president of the Bank of Biscayne Bay. His brother, J.N. Lummus was president of Southern Bank and Trust. The Lummus brothers sold land to developer Carl Fisher and the entrepreneurial Collins / Pancoast family. As bankers they helped finance the development of the land they sold. Together they were all instrumental in development of Miami Beach.

The Lummus brothers, along with a few other investors, formed the Ocean Beach Realty company in 1912 and began buying and selling Miami Beach real estate.

The Town of Miami Beach was incorporated on March 26, 1915, and James N. Lummus, J.E.'s brother, was elected the town's first mayor.

As Miami and Miami Beach pioneers, the Lummus brothers had a number of sites named in their honor including; Lummus Park, Miami Beach, and Lummus Park, Miami, The Lummus Park Historic District and Lummus Island, which is now part of Dodge Island.

In 1936 Lummus joined with 13 other people who had arrived in Miami before 1900 to found the Miami Pioneers Club.

Lummus died at his home in Miami on July 1, 1955 and was buried at Miami's Woodlawn Park.

== See also ==
- List of mayors of Miami
- Government of Miami
- Lummus Park Historic District
- History of Miami
- Timeline of Miami

Political offices
Preceded by John B Reilly	Mayor of the City of Miami; 1900–1903	Succeeded by John Sewell
