= J. N. Lummus =

American banker, businessman and politician (1871–1961)

John Newton Lummus Sr.
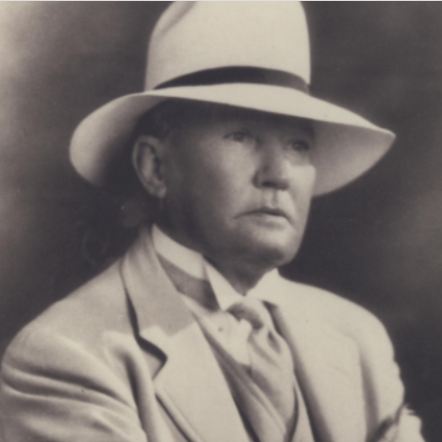

1st Mayor of Miami Beach
- In office 1915–1918
- Succeeded by: Thomas Jessup Pancoast

Personal details
- Born: 25 December 1871
- Died: 26 February 1961 (aged 89) Miami, Florida, US
- Resting place: Woodlawn Park, Miami
- Spouse: Alice Lummus
- Children: John Newton Lummus Jr.

John Newton "J.N." Lummus Sr. (December 25, 1871 – February 26, 1961) was a banker, businessman and first mayor of the city of Miami Beach.

== Early life ==
Lummus was the son of a Confederate Civil War veteran who moved the family to Levy County Florida after the war. J.N. Lummus was a telegraph operator, train dispatcher and later worked clearing land for the Florida East Coast Railway.

The Lummus brothers became some of the early residents of Miami and Miami Beach. J.N.'s brother, J.E. Lummus was 2nd Mayor of Miami.

In the early days of South Florida, the Lummus brothers were both bank presidents. J.E. Lummus was president of the Bank of Biscayne Bay. J.N. Lummus was president of Southern Bank and Trust. The Lummus brothers, Carl Fisher and John Collins together developed Miami Beach. With loans from the Lummus brothers, Collins funded a bridge to connect Miami Beach to the mainland. Carl Fisher provided financing needed to complete the Collins Bridge as well as financing to the Lummus brothers in a land swap deal. Those transactions kicked off the island's first real estate boom.

As Miami and Miami Beach pioneers, the Lummus brothers had a number of sites named in their honor including; Lummus Park, Miami Beach, and Lummus Park, Miami, The Lummus Park Historic District and Lummus Island, which is now part of Dodge Island.

== See also ==
- Miami Beach Mayors
- Miami Beach timeline
- Miami Beach government
