= William Brickell =

American businessman (1817–1908)

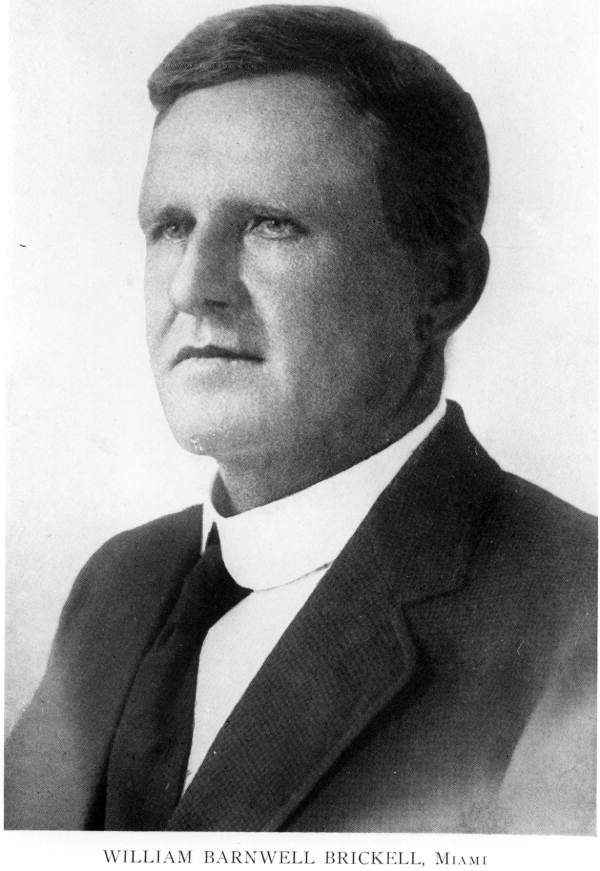
Brickell, co-founder of Miami, Florida

William Brickell (May 22, 1825 – January 14, 1908) was an American businessman. He joined Julia Tuttle and his wife, Mary Brickell, as a co-founder of Miami, Florida.

During the Civil War, Brickell and Mary, whom he met and married in Australia, lived in the White House while he worked as an aide to President Abraham Lincoln.

In 1868, the Brickells purchased two tracts of land, one of which stretched from Coconut Grove to the Miami River, which they purchased from Mrs. Harriet English and her brother Richard Fitzpatrick who had acquired it by grant from the King of Spain. The family moved to southern Florida from Cleveland, Ohio, arriving by ship in 1871. He and his family opened a trading post and post office in their home on the south bank of the Miami River, near the site of Fort Dallas.

The Brickells' neighbor, Julia Tuttle, also originally from Cleveland, is credited with attracting the attention of Florida's east coast railroad and resort hotel magnate Henry M. Flagler to extend his interests to the area. Both Brickell and Tuttle contributed land to the Flagler's Florida East Coast Railway, which brought growth and development and put Miami on the map. After William Brickell's death, his widow, Mary Brickell, became one of the young city's prominent real estate developers and managers (Mary Brickell Village is named after her).

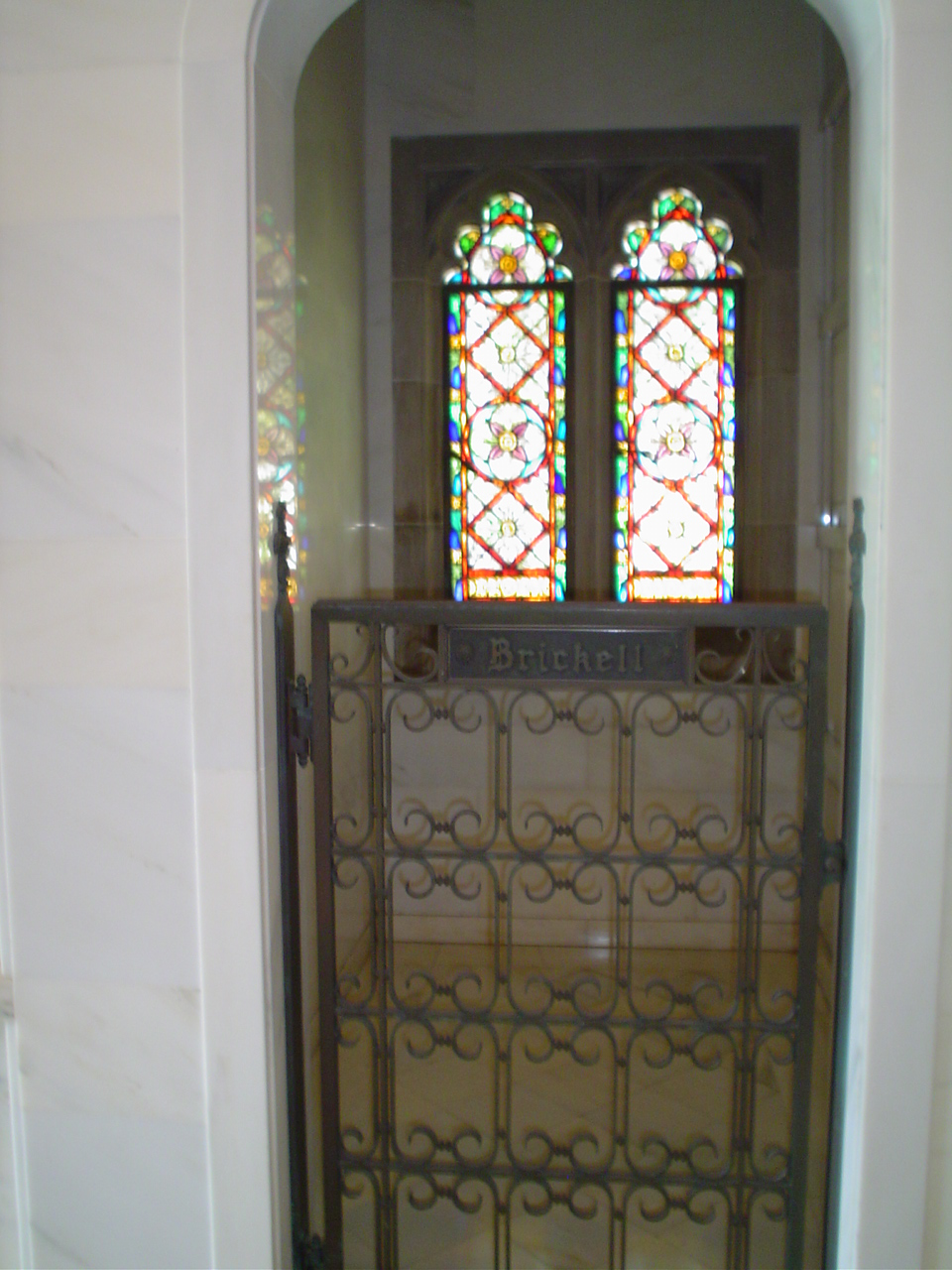
The Brickell family crypt

Originally, William and Mary Brickell were entombed on their property located at 501 Brickell Avenue, Miami, but in 1946 their daughter Maud Brickell decided to move her parents to Woodlawn Park Cemetery and Mausoleum, now Caballero Rivero Woodlawn North Park Cemetery and Mausoleum.

== See also ==
- Brickell
- Brickell Avenue
- Mary Brickell Village
