= William Wagner House =

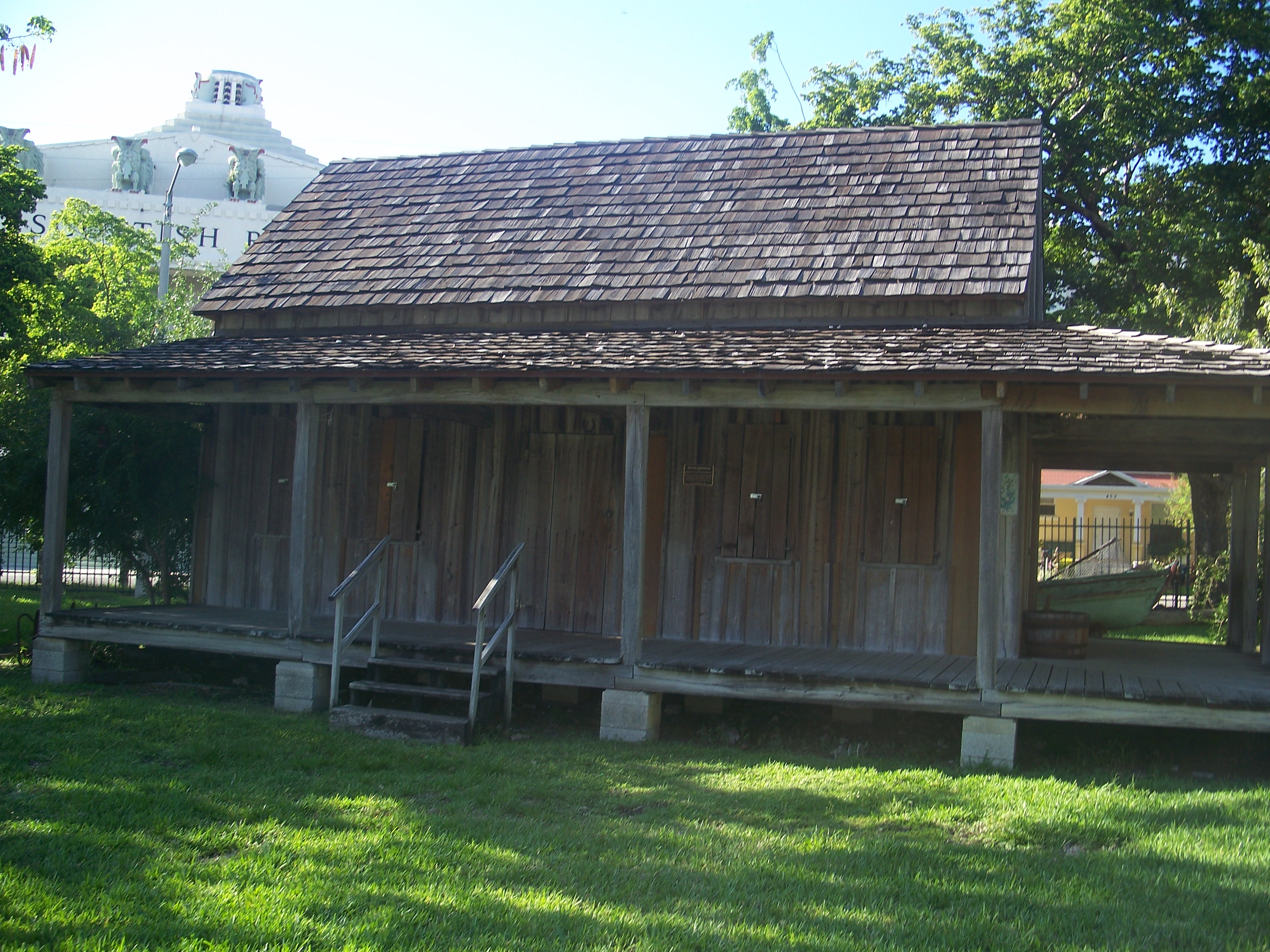
- Interactive map of the William Wagner House area

General information
- Type: Hand-hewn lumber with mortise and tenon joints
- Architectural style: Antebellum
- Location: Lummus Park; 404 Northwest 3rd Street; Miami, Florida
- Coordinates: 25.776544°N 80.202264°W
- Construction started: 1855-1858

The Wagner Homestead was built c. 1855 by William Wagner, who came to Miami with his Creole wife Everline. Wagner, a U.S. Army veteran, had joined the army in 1846, fought in the Mexican War under General Winfield Scott until he was wounded in the Battle of Cerro Gordo, and sent to Charleston S.C. to recuperate. When Wagner's former military unit was sent to reopen Fort Dallas in 1855, he came to the Miami area and decided to move to South Florida. Wagner died in 1901 on his homestead. He was one of the area's first permanent residents and was actively involved in local political and community affairs.

The Wagner house was originally located along a tributary of the Miami River which was later renamed Wagner Creek. In 1979 the Dade Heritage Trust moved the house from its original location near Culmer Metrorail Station to Lummus Park in downtown Miami. The Wagner home reflects the early days of settlement along the Miami River during the nineteenth century and is the only known house in Miami which remains from this period. It is a rare example of vernacular wood frame architecture and is unique in its use of Balloon frame construction.

The home is located in Lummus Park on the north side of the Miami River at NW 4th Avenue and NW 3rd Street. It is the oldest known home still standing in Miami.

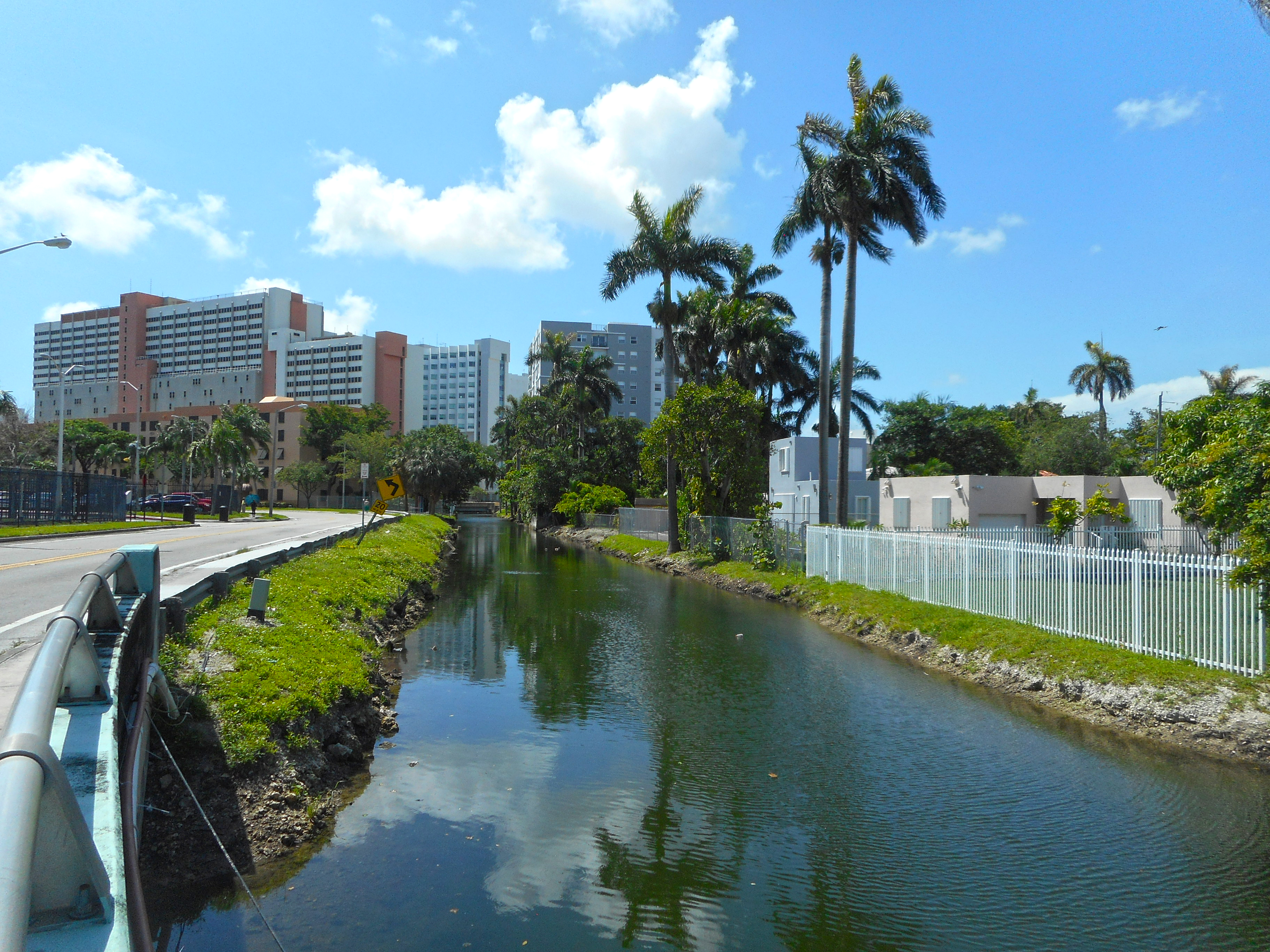
View of Wagner Creek named after William Wagner (NW 16th Street Bridge near 14th Avenue)
