= Lummus Park, Miami Beach =

Park in Miami Beach, Florida, United States

Lummus Park
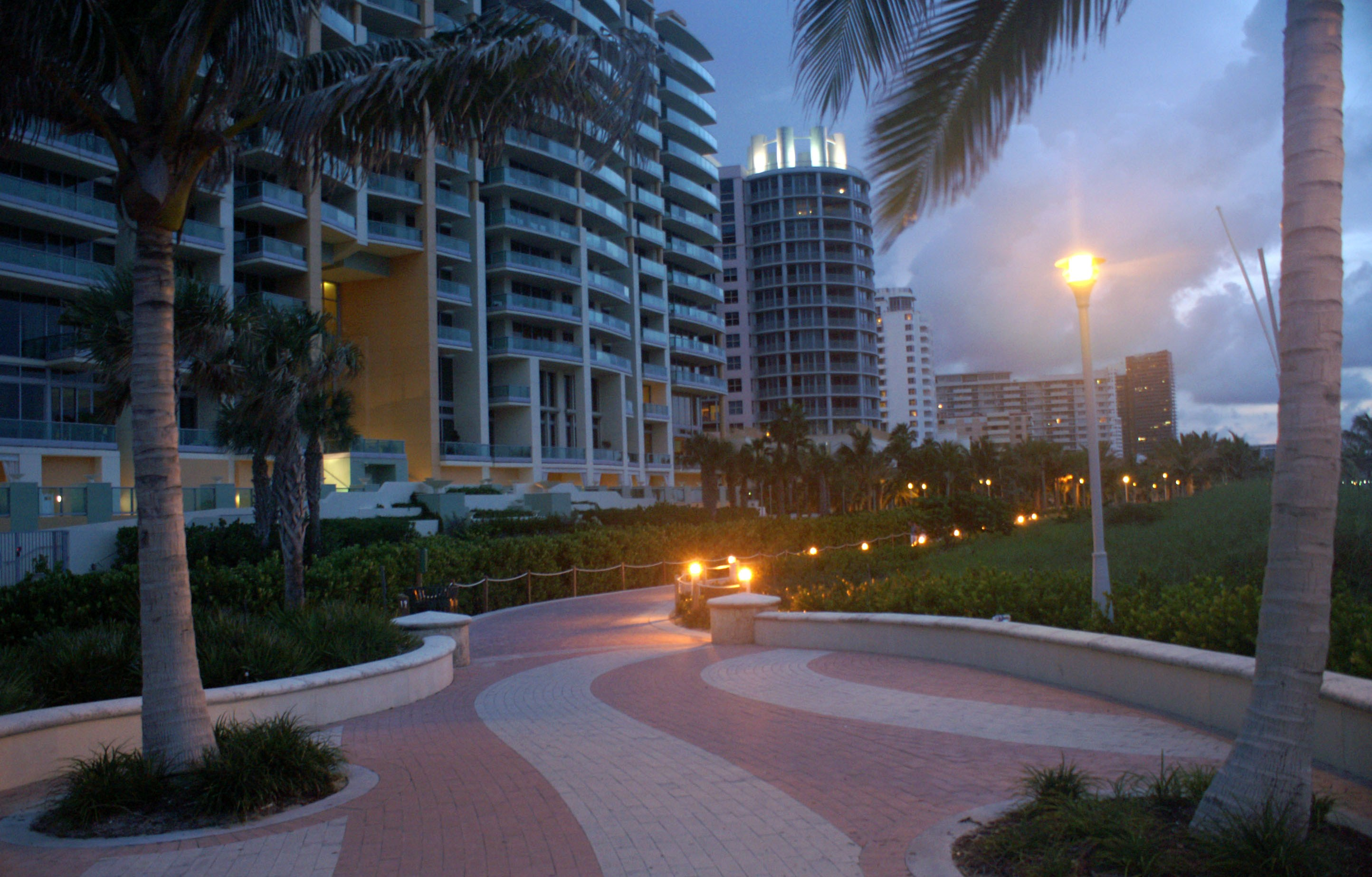
- Lummus Park Boardwalk Entrance
- Interactive map of Lummus Park
- Type: Municipal
- Location: Miami Beach, Florida, United States
- Coordinates: 25.78042°N 80.12990°W
- Area: 74 acres (30 ha)
- Created: 1985
- Operator: City of Miami Beach

Lummus Park is a 74-acre (30 ha) public, urban park in Miami Beach (Miami-Dade, Florida), on the Atlantic Ocean. It was named after the notable Miami pioneers, the Lummus brothers (J.E. Lummus and J.N. Lummus).

== Description ==
The park is on the eastern side of Ocean Drive, from 5th to 15th Streets. When redesigned and improved in the mid-1980s, it became part of the project for the redevelopment of what is now the Miami Beach Architectural District of South Beach. Along Ocean Drive, the park shows grassy areas and palm trees, alongside volleyball courts and pull up bars. A wavy pedestrian walk, called the Promenade, separates the grass of the park and the beach up to 21st St, where it turns into boardwalk. The sidewalk is inspired by Brazilian landscape architect Roberto Burle Marx's oceanfront walk along Copacabana Beach near Rio de Janeiro.

The park is a great backdrop for photo shoots, which happen frequently, and it initially became the location for many scenes from the television series "Miami Vice". The Miami Beach park and the Deco streetscape along Ocean Drive continue to be featured in "Miami" location shots for television and movies, and can be seen in episodes of the USA Network's Burn Notice.

== Events ==
Lummus Park hosts the Nautica South Beach Triathlon every year, an event featuring a 1.5K ocean swim, a 40K bike course, and a 10K run course.

Lummus Park also serves as a stop along the route of the historic Barefoot Mailman Commemorative Hike in which Boy Scouts walk from Pompano Beach to South Beach.

== Gallery ==
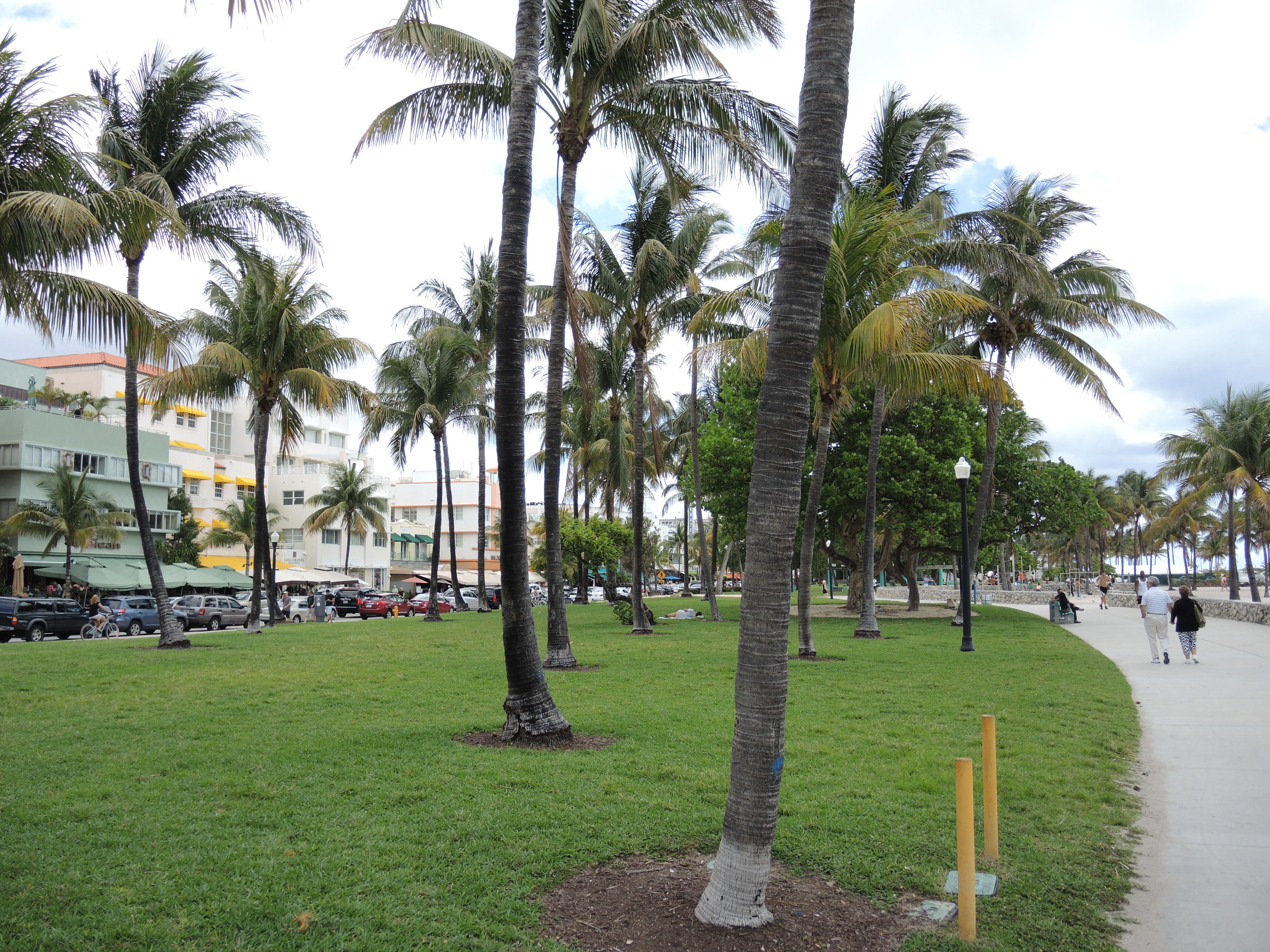
Ocean Drive.

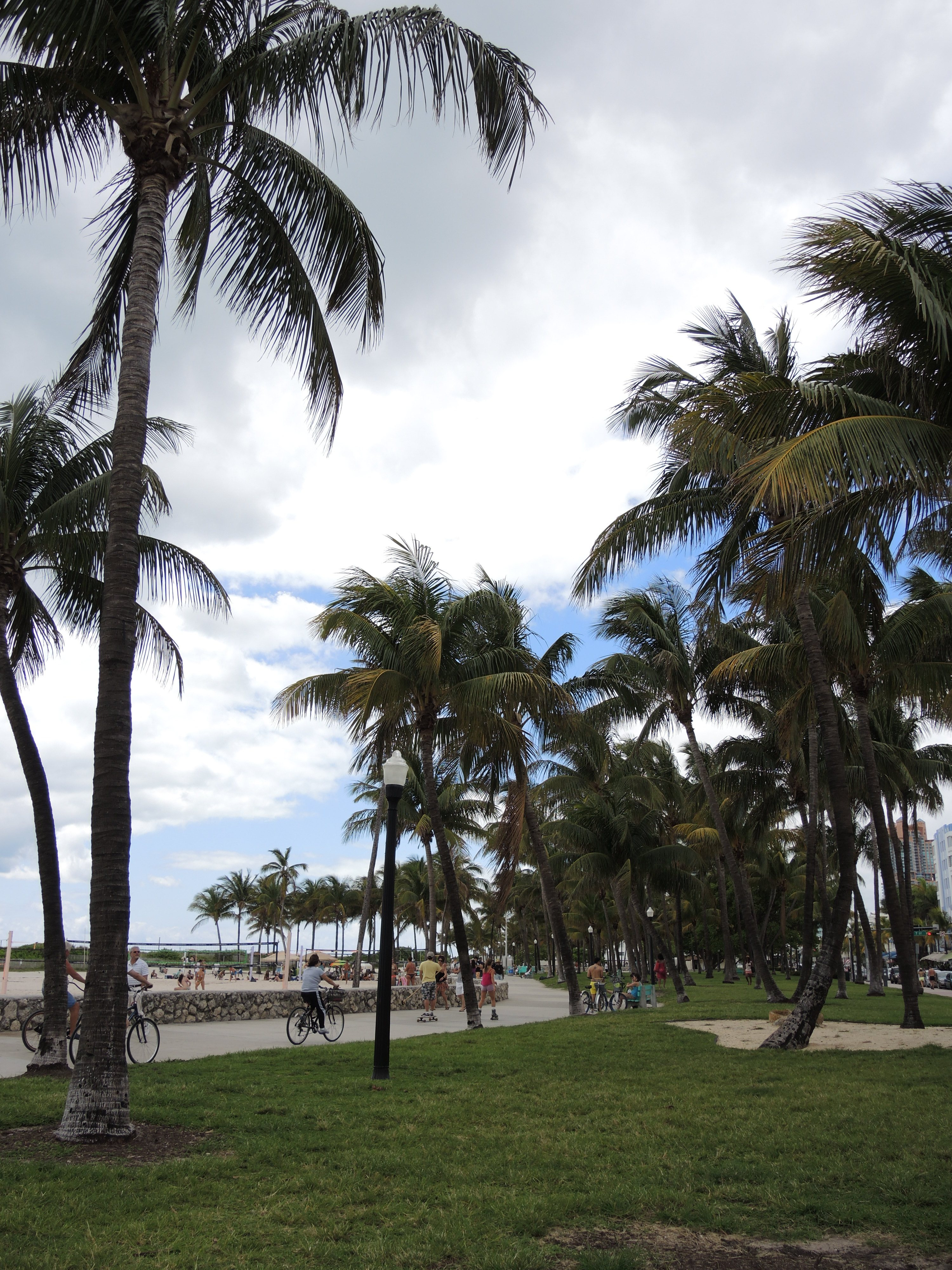
Garden.

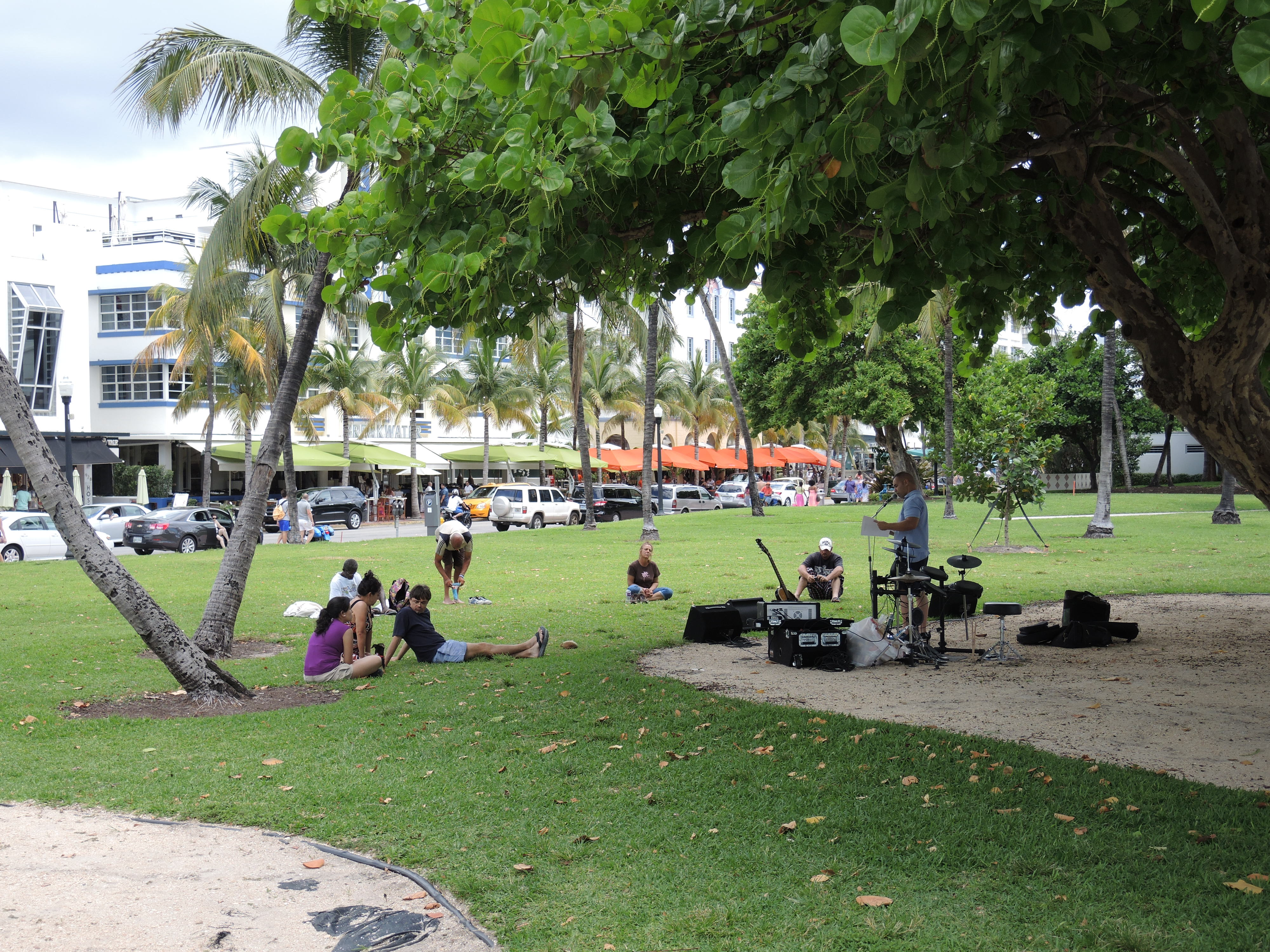
People on the grass.

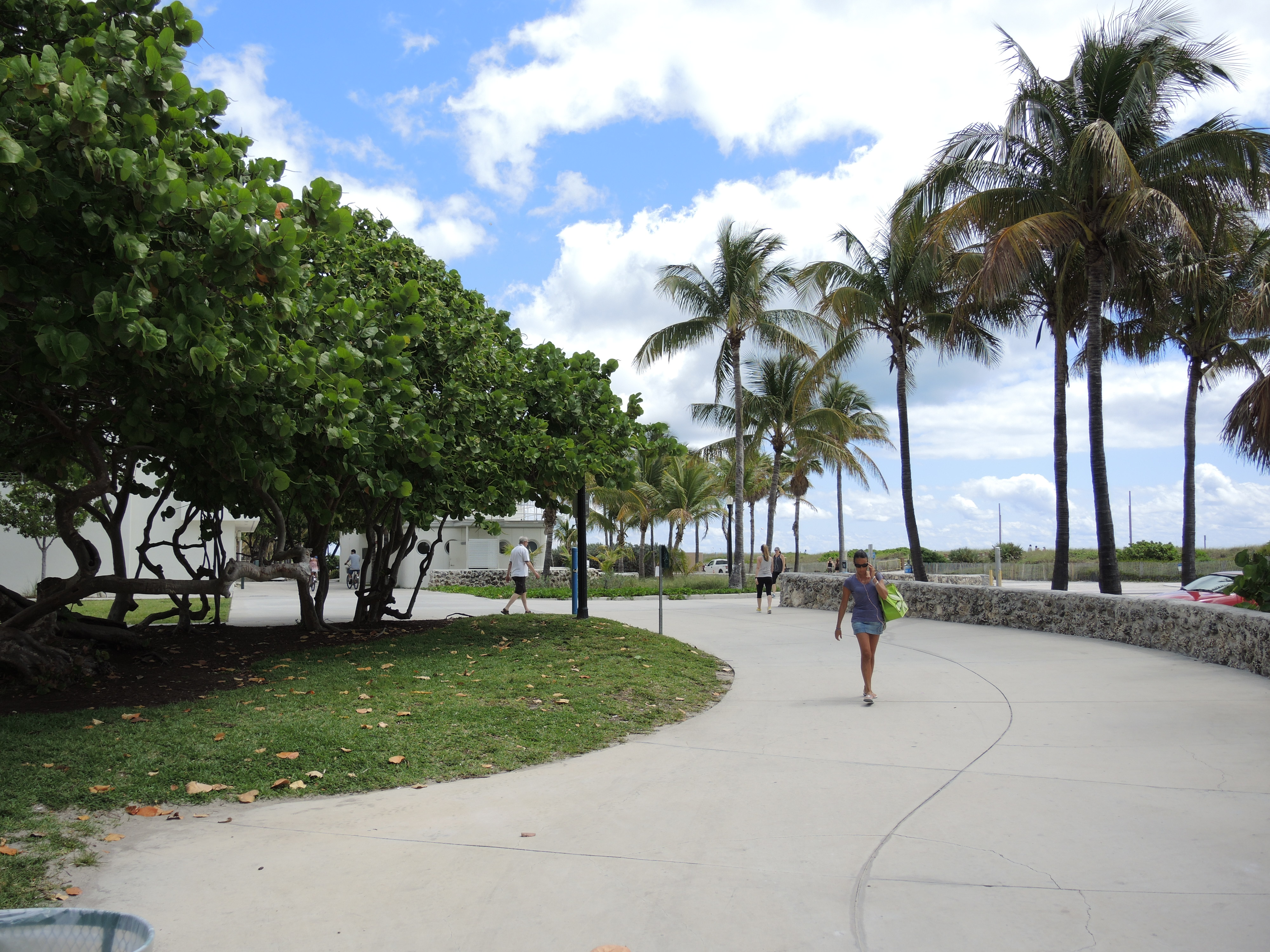
Promenade.

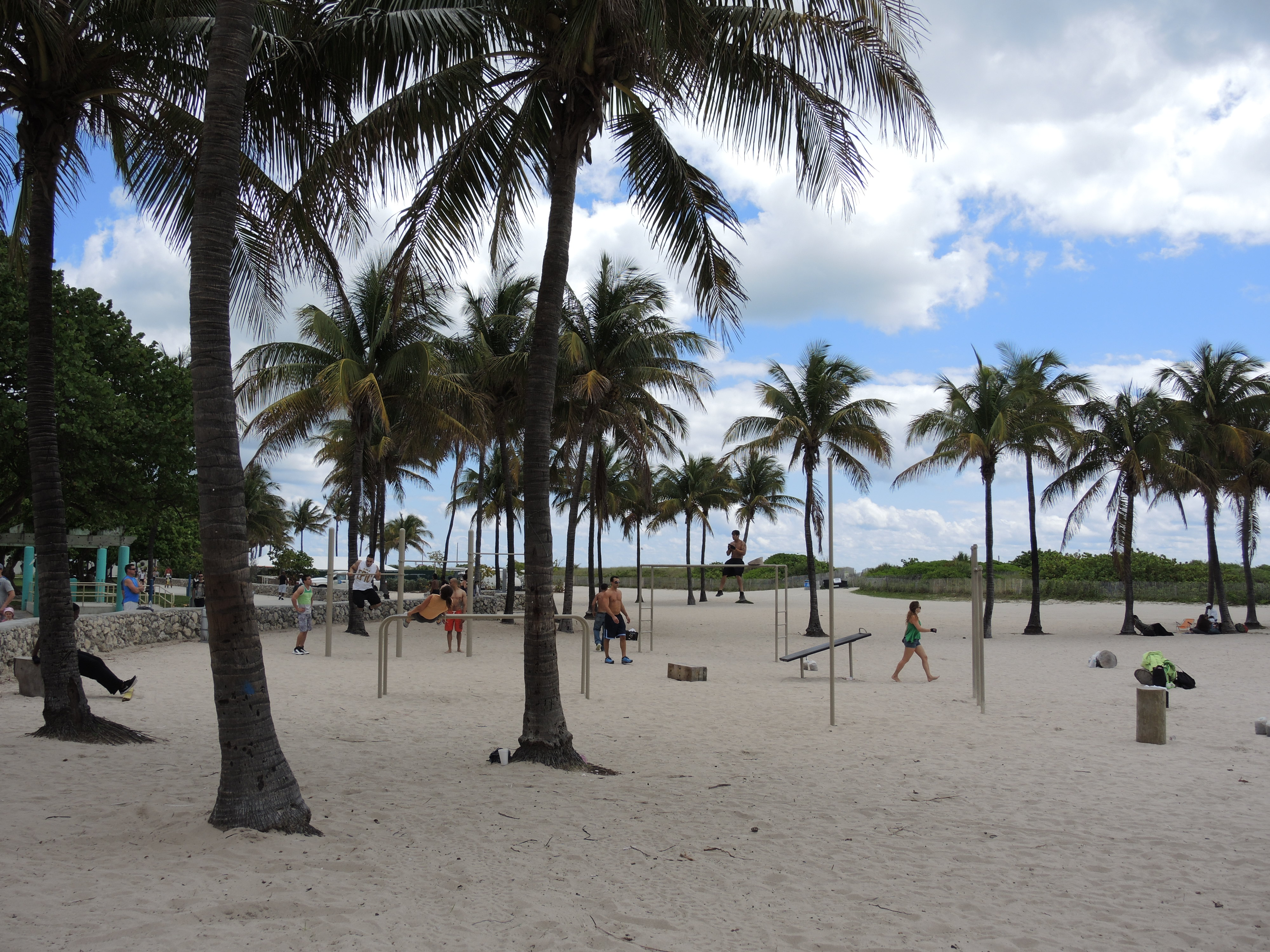
Pull up bars.

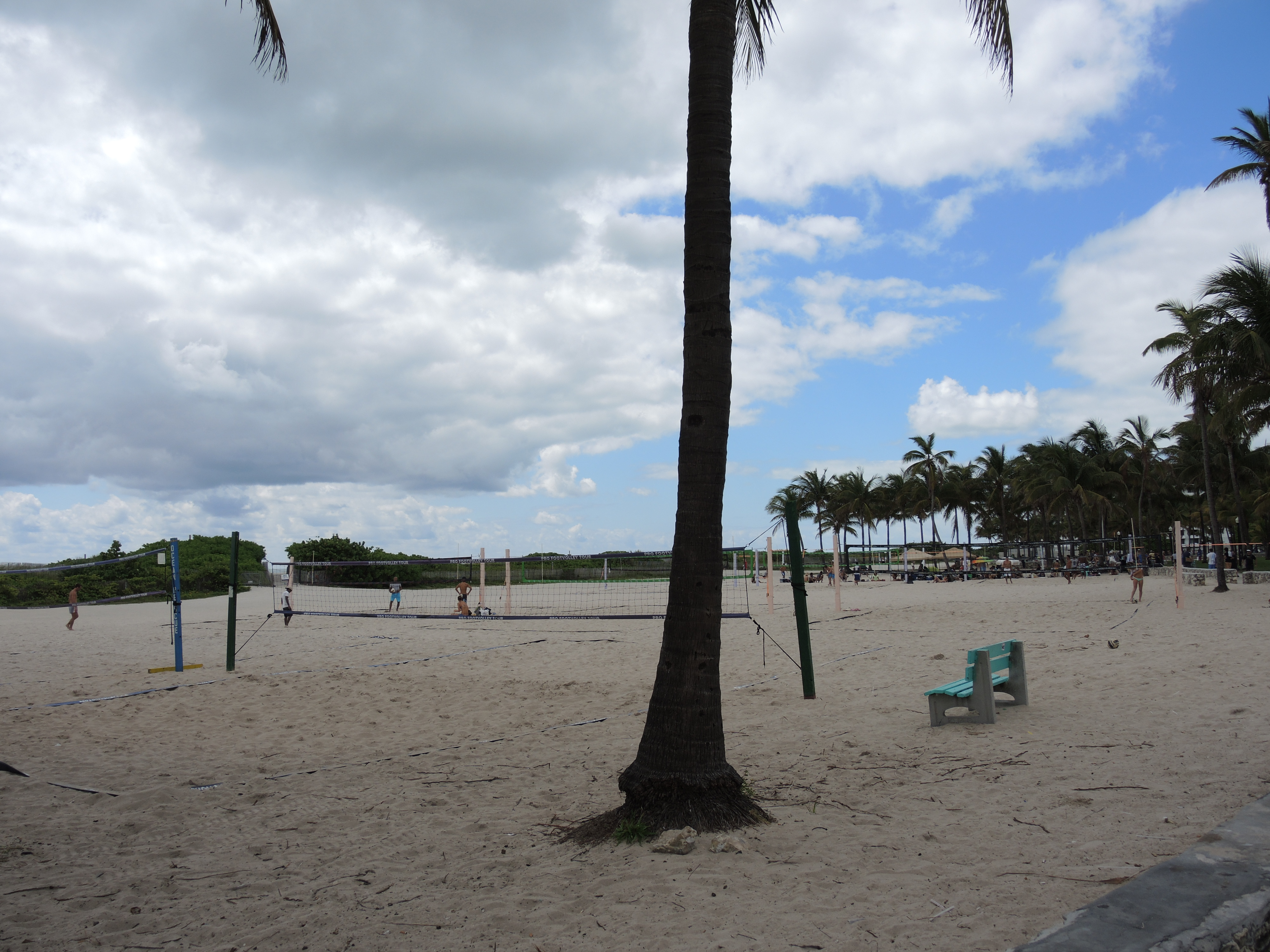
Volleyball courts.

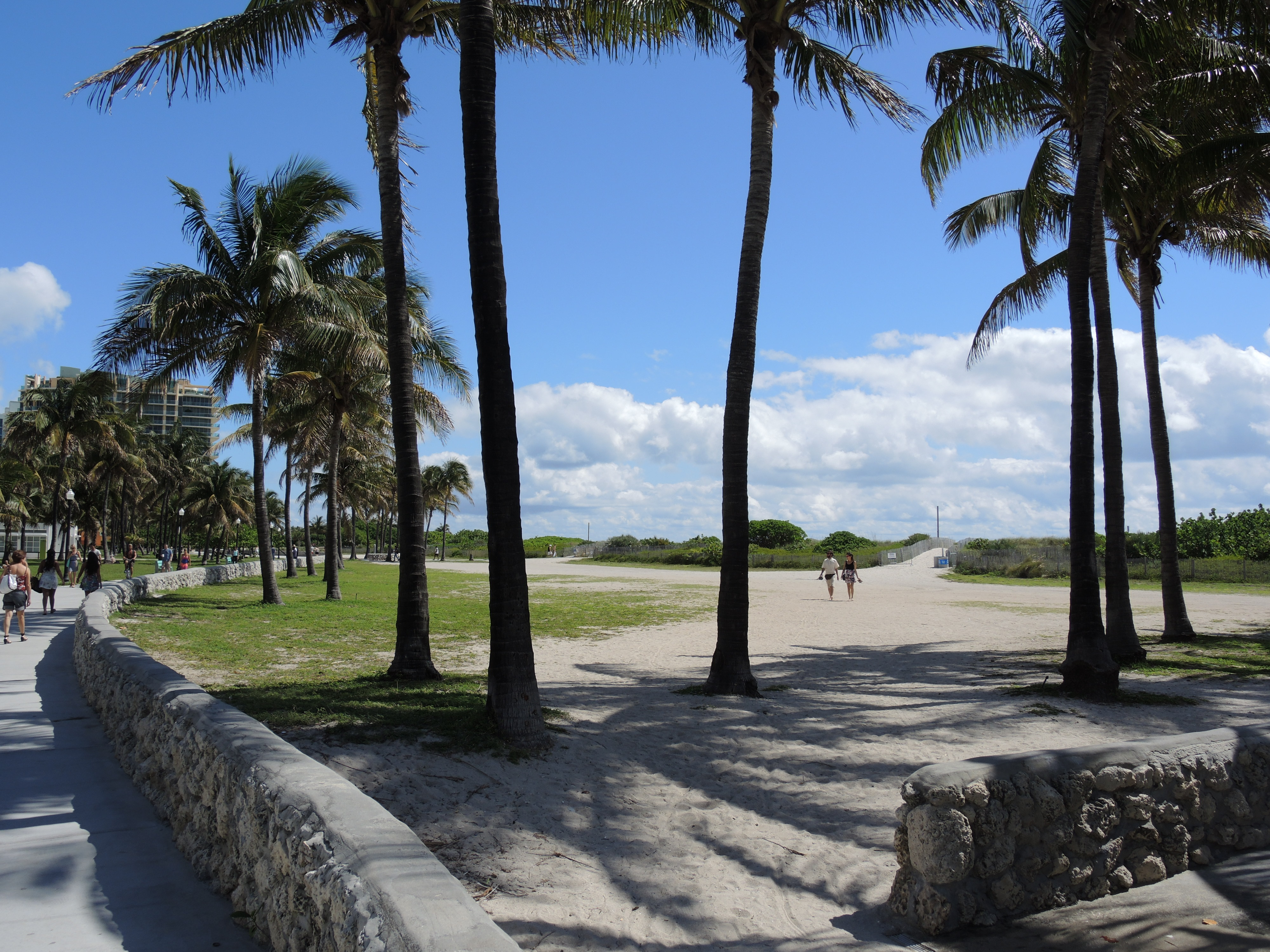
Seaside.

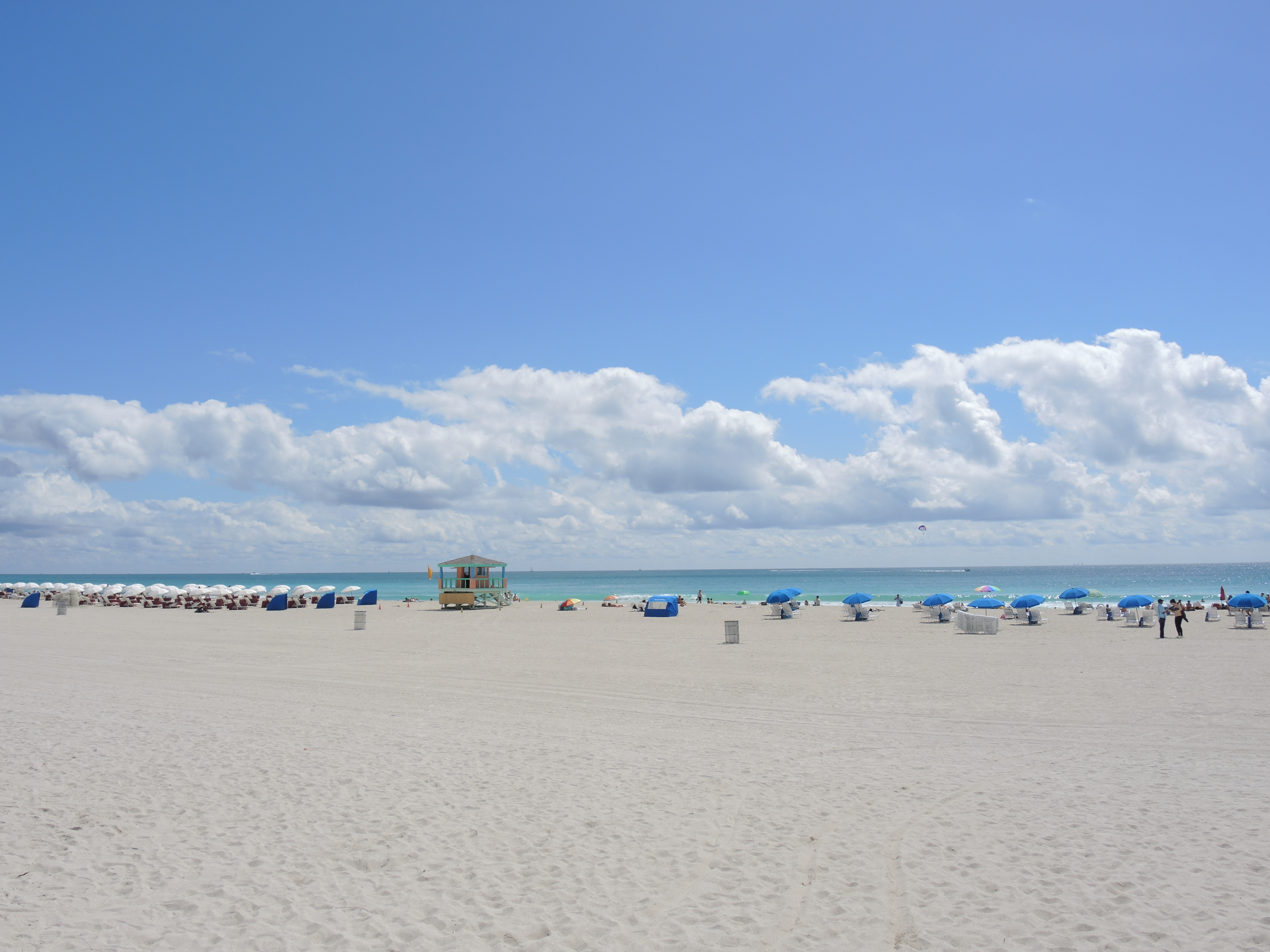
Seashore.

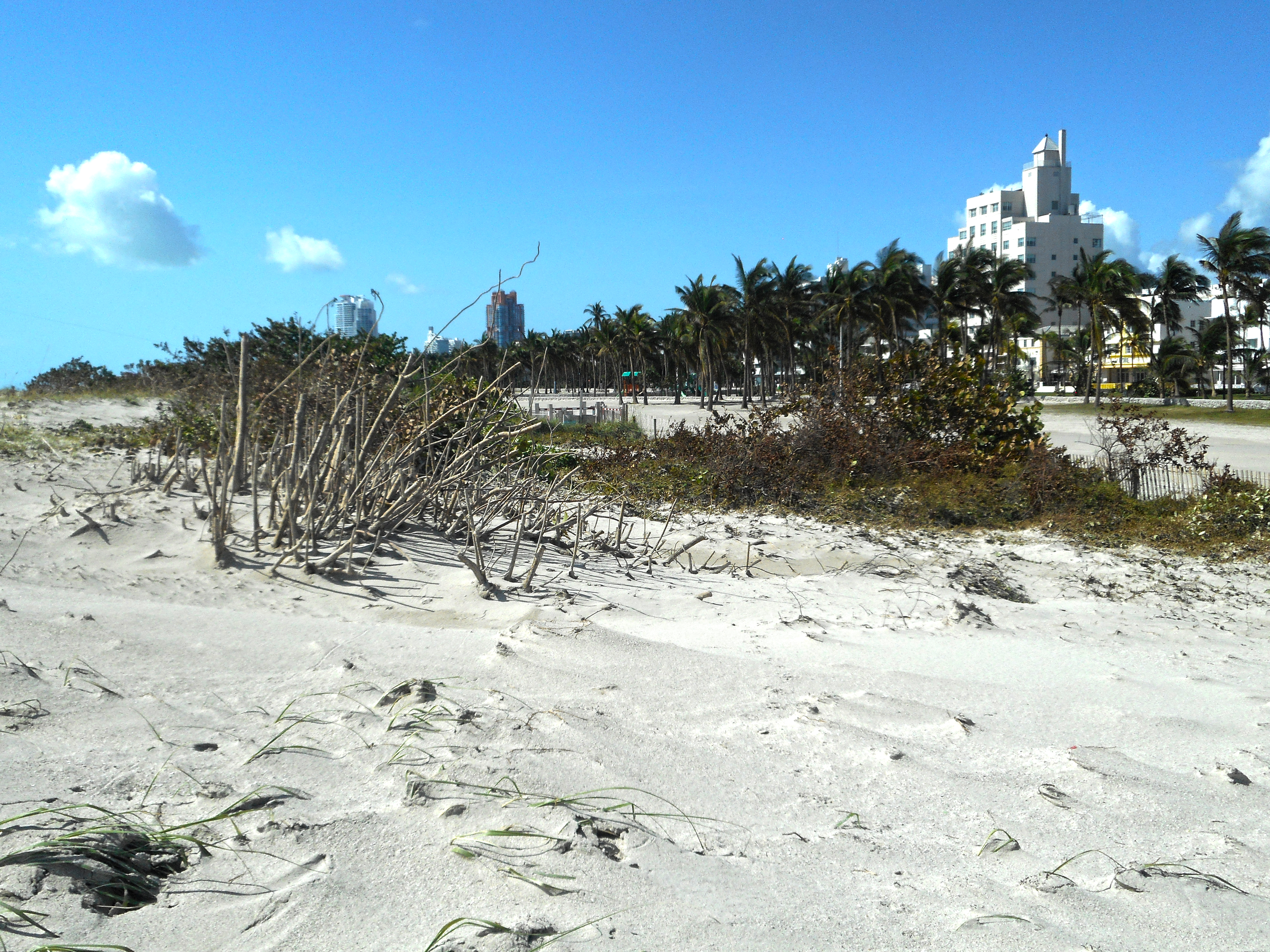
Damage done to dune vegetation by Hurricane Irma, September 11, 2017

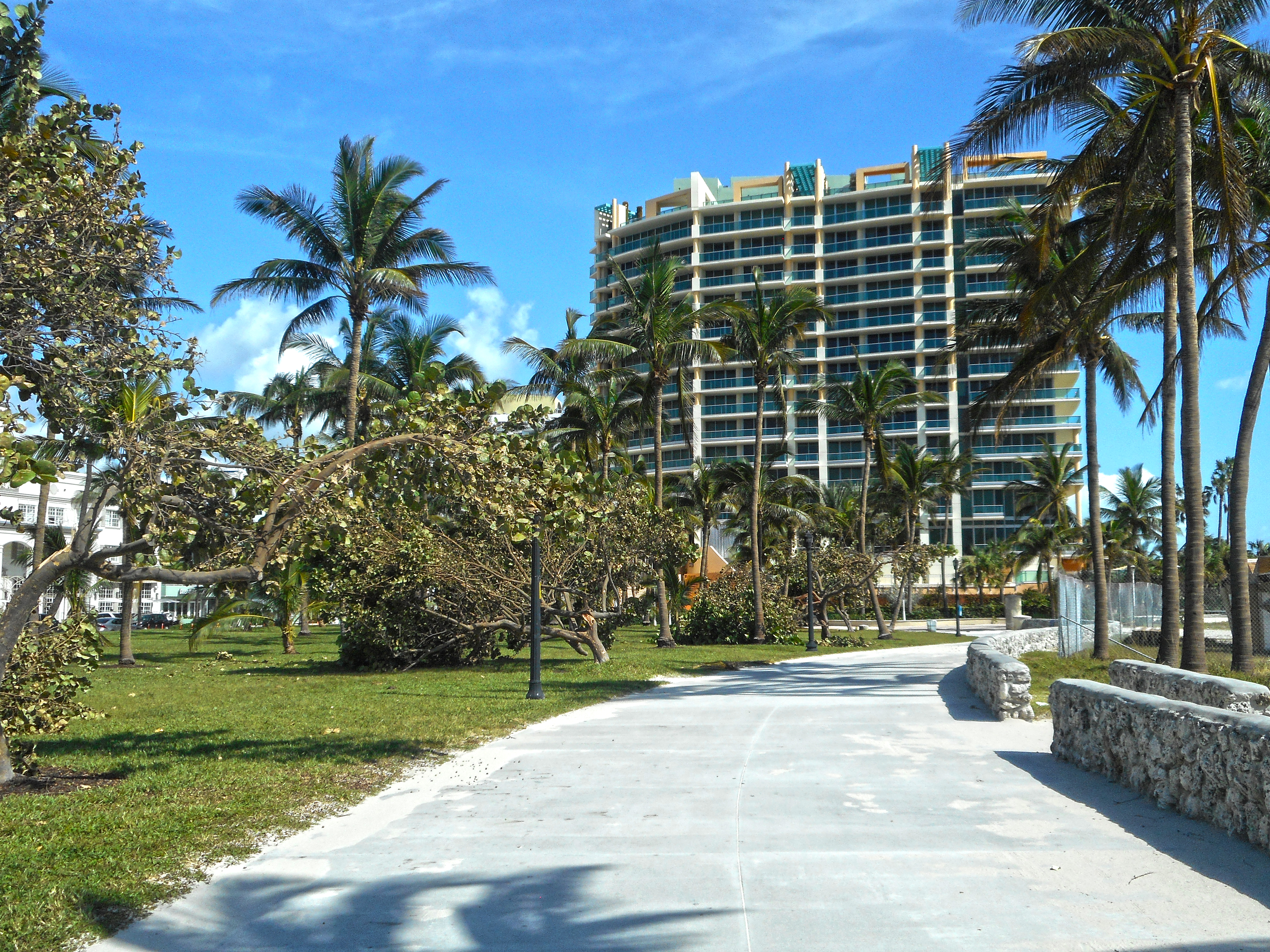
Seagrape trees brought down by Irma in Lummus Park

== See also ==
- Lummus Park, Miami
