= Julia Tuttle =

American businesswoman (1849–1898)

Julia DeForest Tuttle
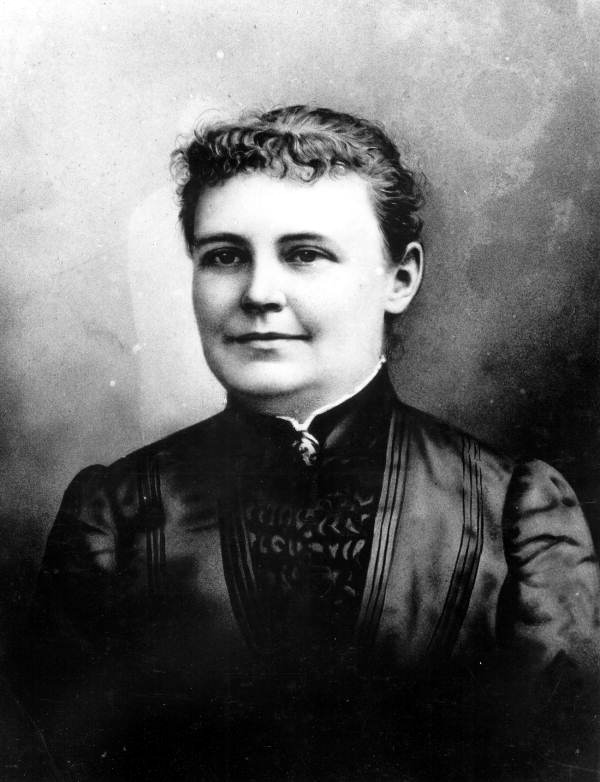
- Portrait of Julia DeForest Tuttle
- Born: January 22, 1849; Cleveland, Ohio, U.S.
- Died: September 14, 1898 (aged 49); Miami, Florida, U.S.
- Spouse: Frederick Leonard Tuttle
- Children: 2

Julia DeForest Tuttle (née Sturtevant; January 22, 1849 – September 14, 1898) was an American businesswoman who owned the property upon which Miami, Florida, was built. For her boosterism, she is called the "Mother of Miami." She is the only woman to have founded what would become a major American city.

== Early life ==
Julia Sturtevant was the daughter of Ephraim Sturtevant, a Florida planter and state senator. She married Frederick Leonard Tuttle on January 22, 1867. They had two children: a daughter, Frances Emeline (b. 1868), and a son, Henry Ethelbert (b. 1870). Julia Tuttle first saw the Biscayne Bay region of South Florida in 1875 with her husband, visiting a 40-acre (16 ha) orange grove her father had purchased. She loved the experience, but returned to Cleveland, Ohio, with her family.

== Move to South Florida ==
Tuttle came to Fort Dallas, Florida, from Cleveland to visit her father, who had homesteaded in the Biscayne Bay area. As her husband’s health declined from tuberculosis, she managed his business responsibilities. After his death in 1886, she decided to leave Ohio permanently and make Florida her home.

Tuttle used the money from her parents' estate to purchase the James Egan grant of 640 acres (2.6 km^{2}), where the city of Miami is now located, on the north side of the Miami River, including the old Fort Dallas stone buildings, and the two-story rock house built by Richard Fitzpatrick's enslaved workers some 50 years earlier. This was converted into her home. In 1891, Tuttle brought her family to live there. She repaired and converted the home into one of the show places in the area with a sweeping view of the river and Biscayne Bay. She stated in a letter to her friend, “It may seem strange to you, but it is the dream of my life to see this wilderness turned into a prosperous country. Where this tangled mass of vine, brush, trees and rocks now are to see homes with modern improvements surrounded by beautiful grassy lawns, flowers, shrubs and shade trees.”

Tuttle saw the opportunity to found a new city on the Miami River, but knew that a railroad was necessary to attract development. Tuttle tried to induce Henry Flagler to extend his Florida East Coast Railway to Fort Dallas, and offered to divide her large real estate holdings as an enticement. After numerous fruitless letters she made the trip to St. Augustine and made a personal appeal, again unsuccessful. Good fortune for her expansionist ambitions took the form of the Great Freeze of 1894-1895, which devastated the old orange belt of central and northern Florida, wiping out valuable groves and fortunes alike.

Either Flagler recalled Tuttle's touting of the South Florida weather and sent some men to investigate, or Tuttle alerted Flagler that the freeze had spared the Miami River area, sending as evidence a bouquet of flowers and foliage (possibly oranges) as proof; the order to extend his railroad came. Under an agreement between the two, Tuttle supplied Flagler with the land for a hotel and a railroad station for free, and they split the remainder of her 640 acres (2.6 km^{2}) north of the Miami River in alternating sections.

On February 15, 1896, Joseph B. Reilly, John Sewell, and E.G. Sewell, the vanguard of the Flagler forces, arrived, and the work of building the Royal Palm Hotel was commenced. On April 22, 1896, train service of the Florida East Coast Railway came to the area. On July 28, male residents voted to incorporate a new city, Miami. Steady growth followed.

== Death ==
In 1898, Tuttle fell ill with apparent meningitis. Plans were made to move her to Asheville, North Carolina, by rail for treatment, but her condition deteriorated before she could be transported. She died on September 14, 1898, at age 49. Her funeral took place at her Fort Dallas home, and she was buried in a place of honor at the City of Miami Cemetery. Her tombstone notes her year of birth as 1848, while other sources list 1849.

== Legacy ==
Tuttle died leaving a large amount of debt, partly the result of her land grant incentives to Flagler. Her children sold her remaining land to pay it off. Her name was mostly forgotten until it was placed on a causeway for Interstate 195 over Biscayne Bay on December 12, 1959. In contrast, the name of William Brickell, a large landowner on the south side of the Miami River who contributed to Tuttle's efforts to incorporate the city, appeared widely on the south side of what became Miami.

Just as Tuttle is called the Mother of Miami, Flagler became known as the Father of Miami. Both Tuttle and Brickell had previously lived in Cleveland, where they first met.

In addition to the Julia Tuttle Causeway, the memory of Tuttle has been honored with a sculpture in Bayfront Park, by Daub and Firmin. Additionally, the large downtown Miami food hall, Julia & Henry's, is named for her and Flagler.

Julia Tuttle inspired several projects of the Miami Girls Foundation and the Miami Girls Manifesto written by Rebecca Fishman-Lipsey.

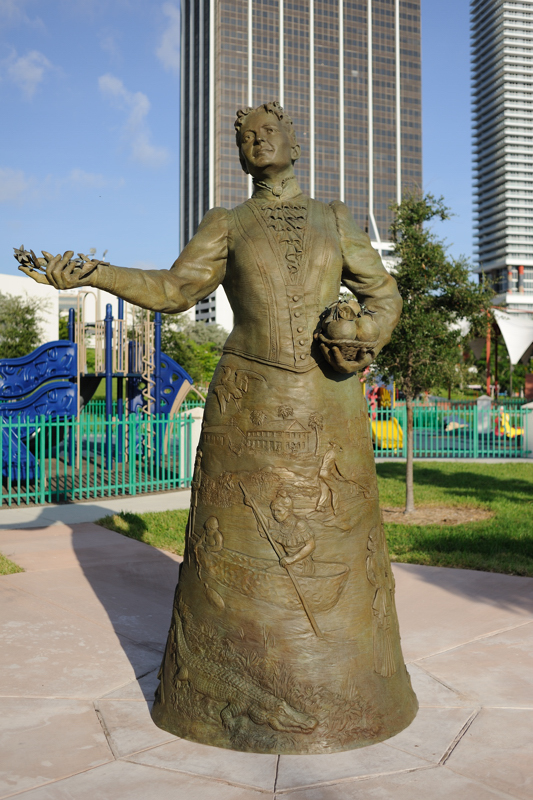
Julia Tuttle statue in Bayfront Park - Miami

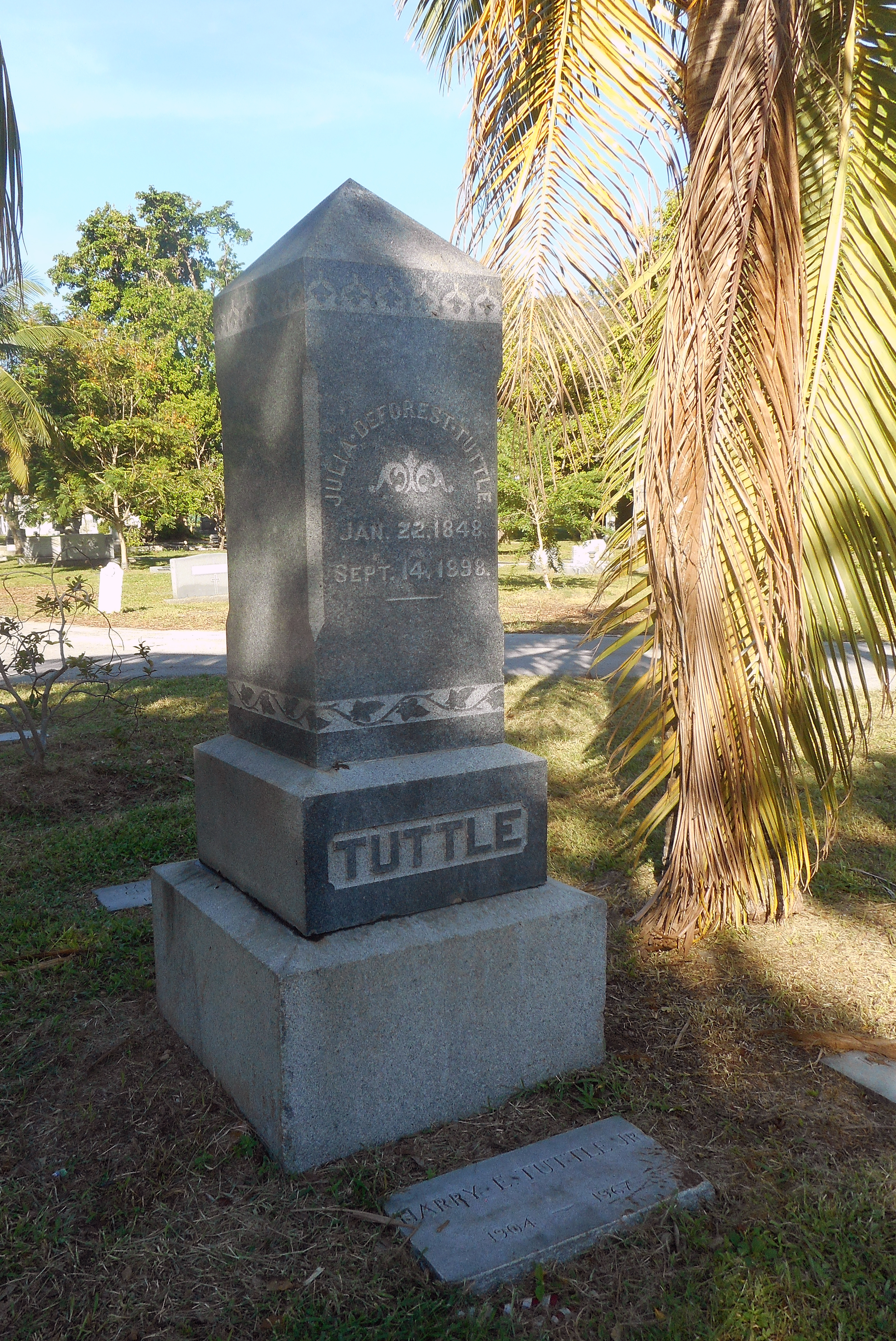
Julia Tuttle memorial marker in the Miami City Cemetery

== Sources ==
- Akin, Edward N.. The Cleveland Connection: Revelations from the John D. Rockefeller - Julia Tuttle Correspondences. In Tequesta: the Journal of the Historical Association of Southern Florida, no. XLII (1982).
- Frank, Andrew K. Before the Pioneers: Indians, Settlers, Slaves, and the Founding of Miami (University Press of Florida, 2017)
- Peters, Thelma. Biscayne Country, 1870-1926. Miami, Fla.: Banyan Books, c1981.
- Tuttle Family Papers. Finding aid. Tuttle Family Papers - 1889-1954 -
- Wiggins, Larry. The Birth of the City of Miami. In Tequesta: the Journal of the Historical Association of Southern Florida, no. LV (1995).
