= Ephraim Sturtevant =

American politician (1803–1881)

Ephraim Tanner Sturtevant (July 28, 1803 – December 12, 1881) was an American professor, planter, and politician. He was the father of Julia Tuttle, known as the "Mother of Miami".

== Early life and education ==
Sturtevant, son of Warren and Lucy (Tanner) Sturtevant, was born in Warren, Connecticut, on July 28, 1803. In 1816, his family removed to the Western Reserve and settled in Tallmadge, Ohio, from which place he entered college. He graduated from Yale College in 1826.

== Career ==
For twenty years after graduation he was occupied in teaching, beginning in Derby, Connecticut. In the fall of 1827, on the opening of Western Reserve College, at Hudson, Ohio, he was appointed instructor in mathematics, and in the absence of other teachers performed the duties of the entire faculty for the first year. In May, 1829, finding the burden too severe, he resigned his position and opened a select school in Tallmadge, which he maintained with great success until 1846, when, in consequence of impaired health, he removed to a farm in East Cleveland, Ohio, where he was involved in many civic and educational endeavors.

At length he felt obliged to remove from this trying climate, and in March, 1870, he settled on Biscayne Bay in Southern Florida, where he occupied himself in cultivating tropical fruits and flowers. He also took an active part in the Reconstruction government of the state and was efficient in promoting the control of the Republican Party. He was twice appointed County Judge, and in 1872 he was elected to the Florida State Senate for four years.

== Personal life ==
In 1829 he married Helen L. Oviatt, of Hudson, who died early, leaving a daughter who survived for only a single year. He next married Julia A. DeForest, of Huntington, Connecticut, who died in 1845, leaving a daughter and two sons. He again married, this time to Frances (Pierce) Leonard, of Woodbury, Connecticut, who survived him with one daughter; one son by his second marriage also survived him.

In the spring of 1880 the infirmities of advancing age compelled him to return to Cleveland, where he made his home with his only surviving daughter, for the rest of his life. He died in Cleveland, December 12, 1881, aged 78 years.

On his death, his daughter Julia Tuttle inherited and relocated to his land in Florida, where she would eventually found the city of Miami.
