= Lummus Park, Miami =

Park in Miami, Florida, United States

Lummus Park
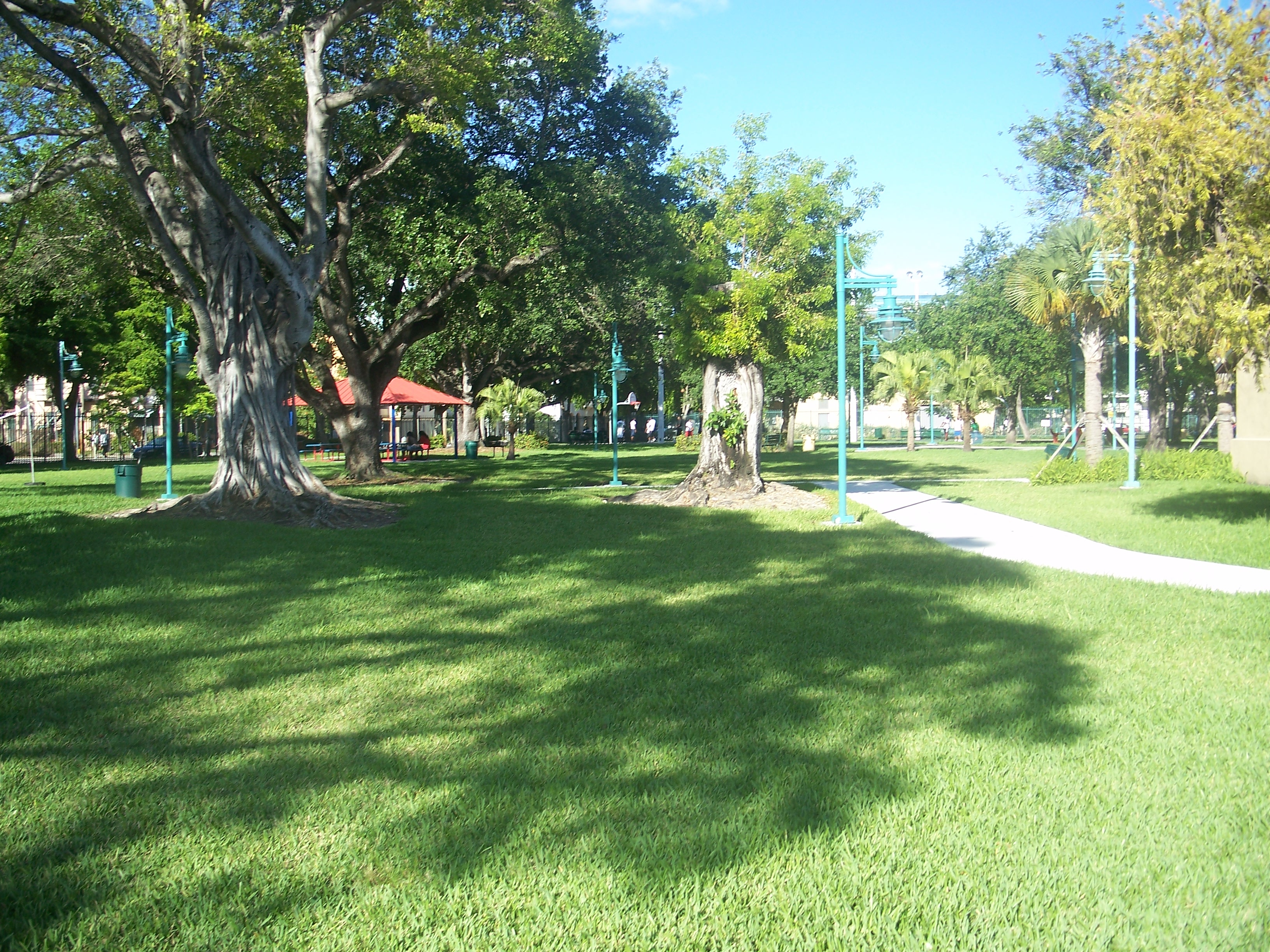
- Lummus Park central area
- Interactive map of Lummus Park
- Type: Municipal
- Location: Miami, Florida, United States
- Coordinates: 25.776944°N 80.201389°W
- Area: 5.9 acres (2.4 ha)
- Created: 1909
- Operator: City of Miami

Lummus Park is a 5.9-acre (2.4 ha) urban park in the Lummus Park Historic District of Miami, Florida, just west of Downtown.

== Geography ==
Lummus park is on the eastern side of Miami River and it is roughly bounded by NW 3rd Street to the north, where the park has one of its entrance, and by NW 2nd Street to the south, where there is a second entrance; NW 3rd Court to the east separates the park and Interstate 95.

In addition to a large grassy area, in the central zone of the park there are basketball and volleyball courts, playgrounds and garden seats. Between Lummus park and NW 3rd Avenue there are the horses of the City of Miami police mounted patrol.

== History ==
Lummus Park was created in 1909 as one of Miami's first open, green spaces. It was first named City Park and later named after the notable Miami pioneers, the Lummus brothers ( J.E. Lummus and J.N. Lummus). The opening of the park in 1909, spurred development in the area, and today, most of the building around the park were built before 1926. On October 25, 2006, the park and the buildings on its northern boundary were added to the U.S. National Register of Historic Places as Lummus Park Historic District.

In addition to the buildings of the historic district, in the western part of the park have been moved two buildings of Miami's pioneer history: William Wagner House, example of braced frame construction dated back to 1857, and the only remaining limestone structure of Fort Dallas, dating back to 1836.

== See also ==
- Lummus Park Historic District
- J.E. Lummus
- J.N. Lummus

== Gallery ==
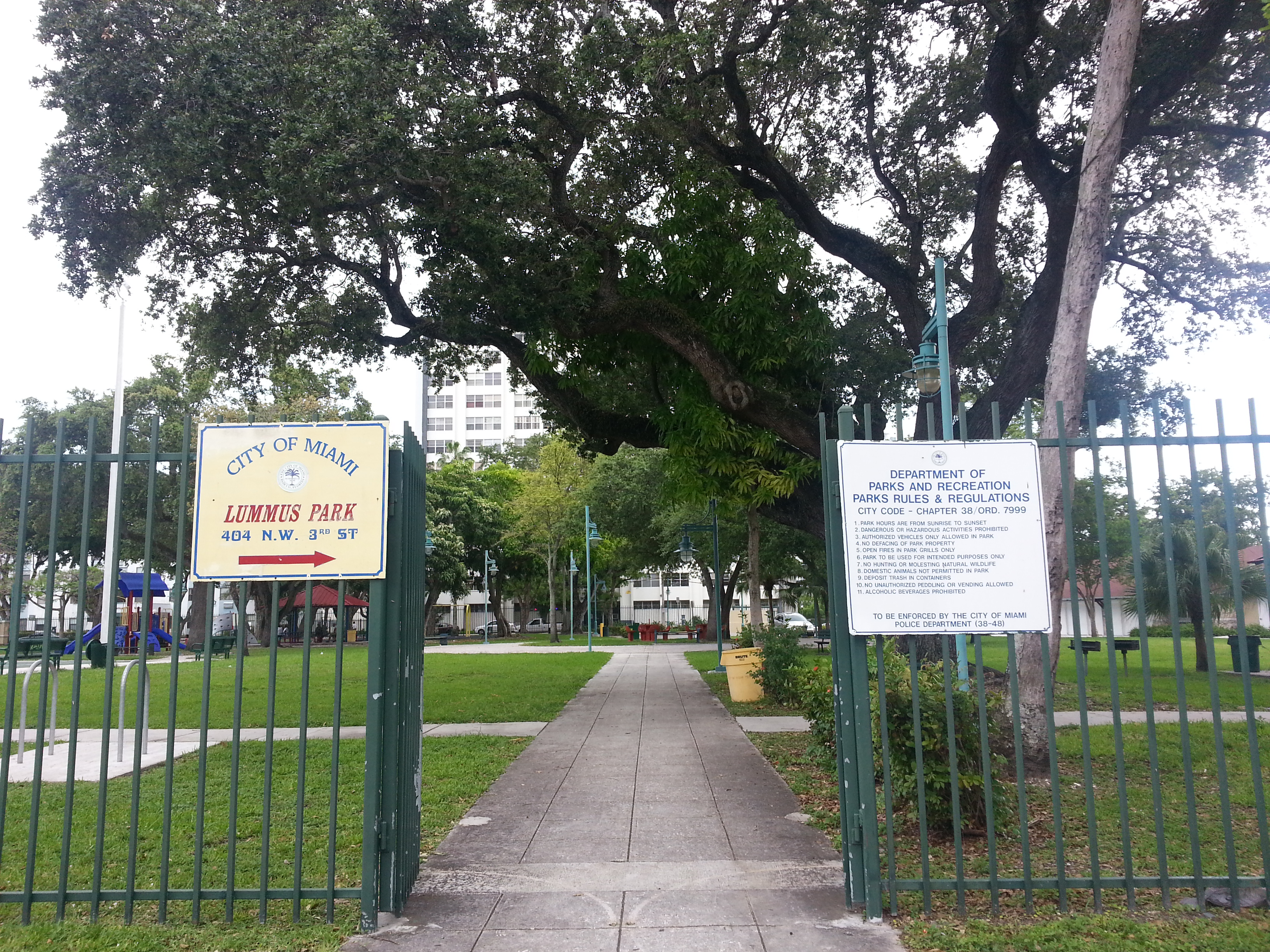
Entrance.jpg on NW 3rd Street

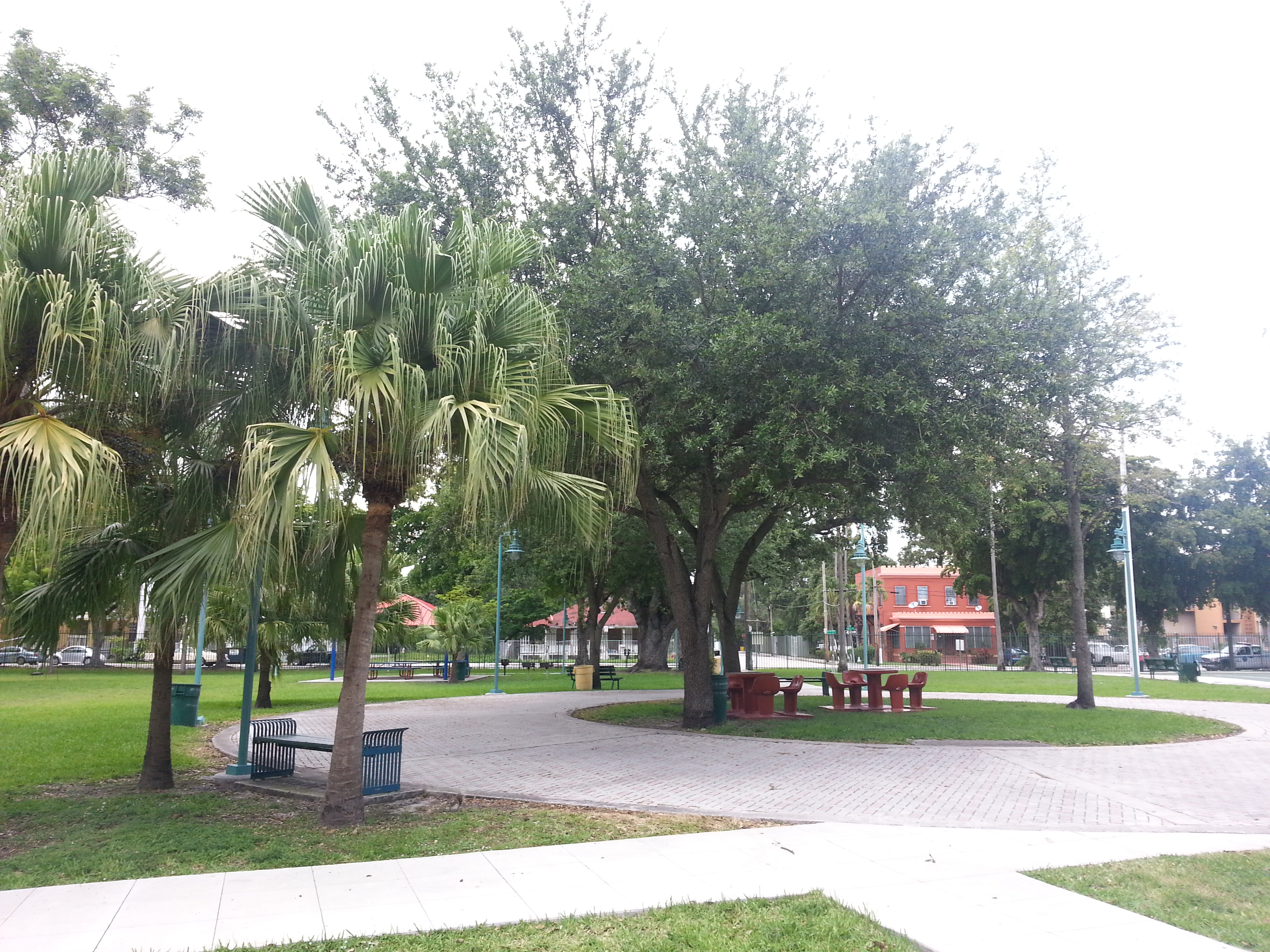
Central area

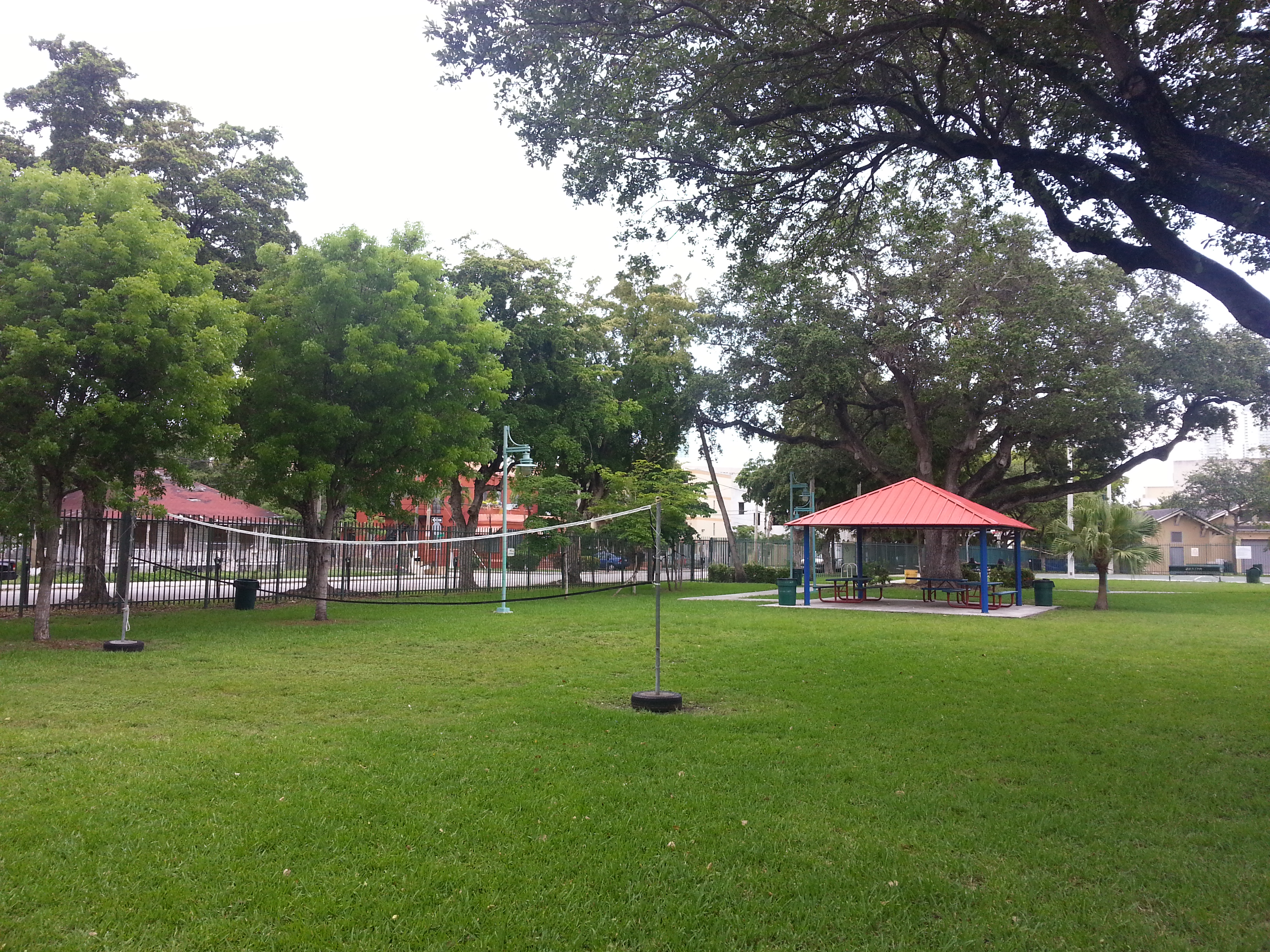
Volleyball courts and garden seats

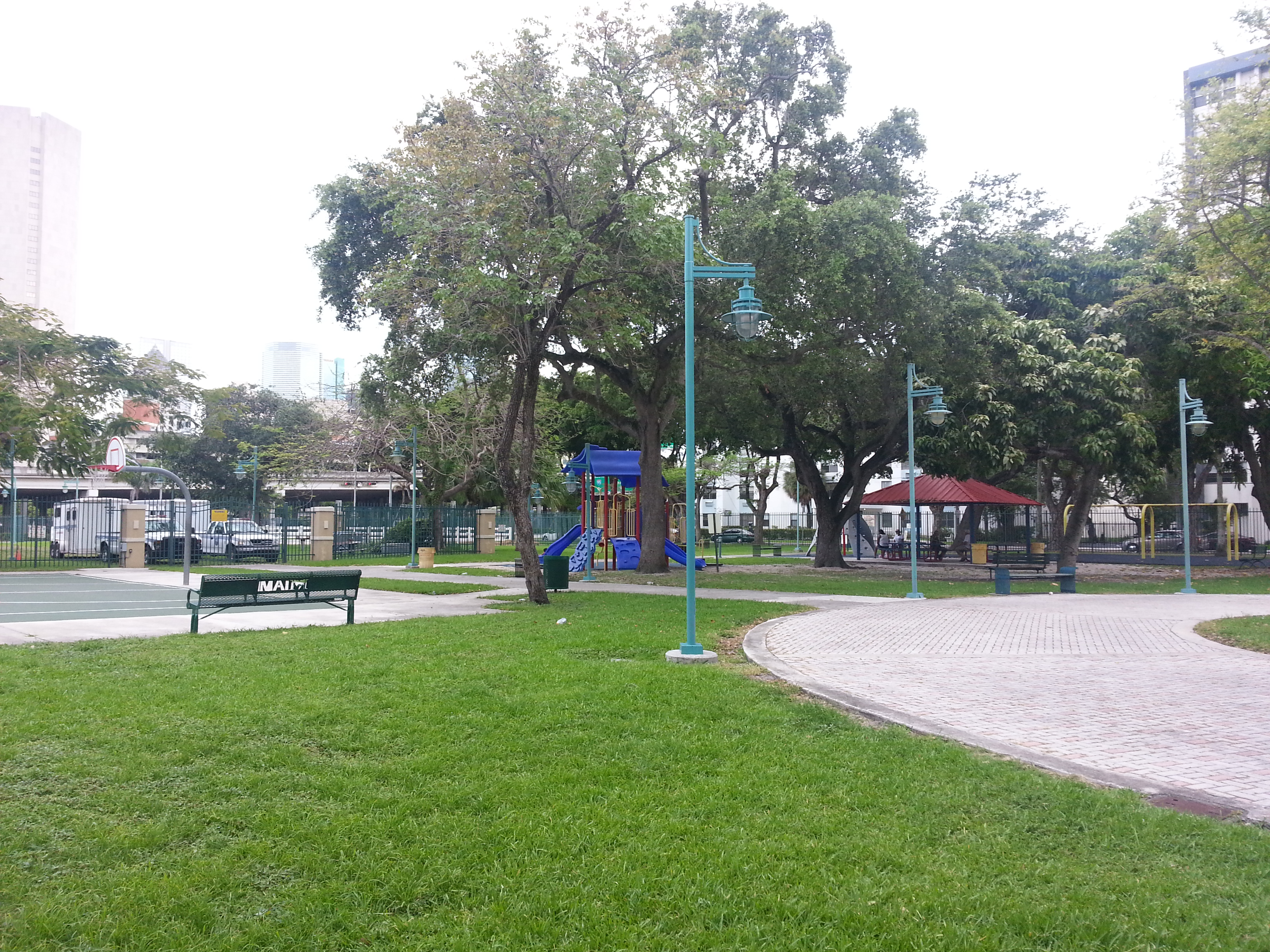
Basketball court and playground

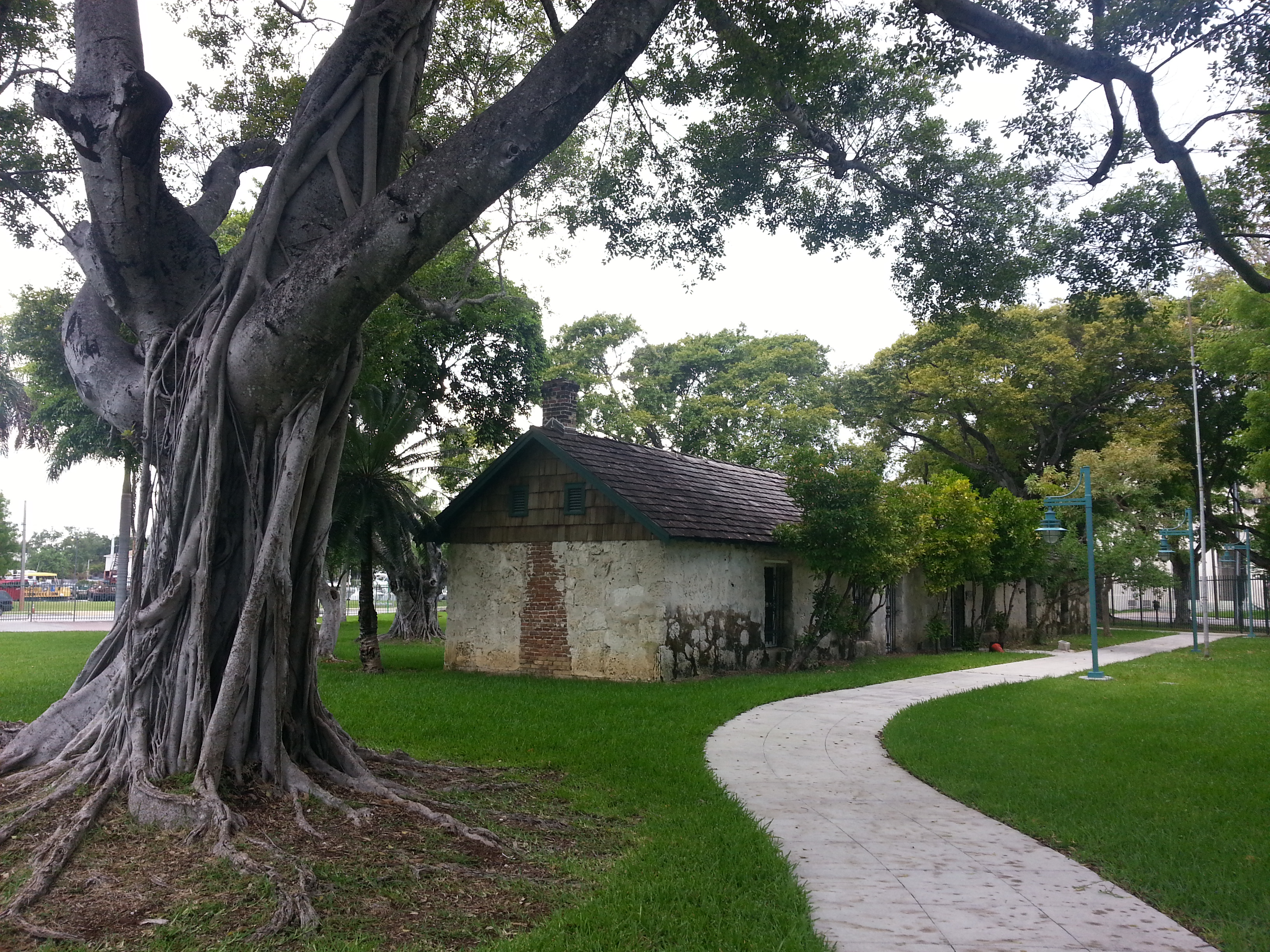
Fort Dallas barracks

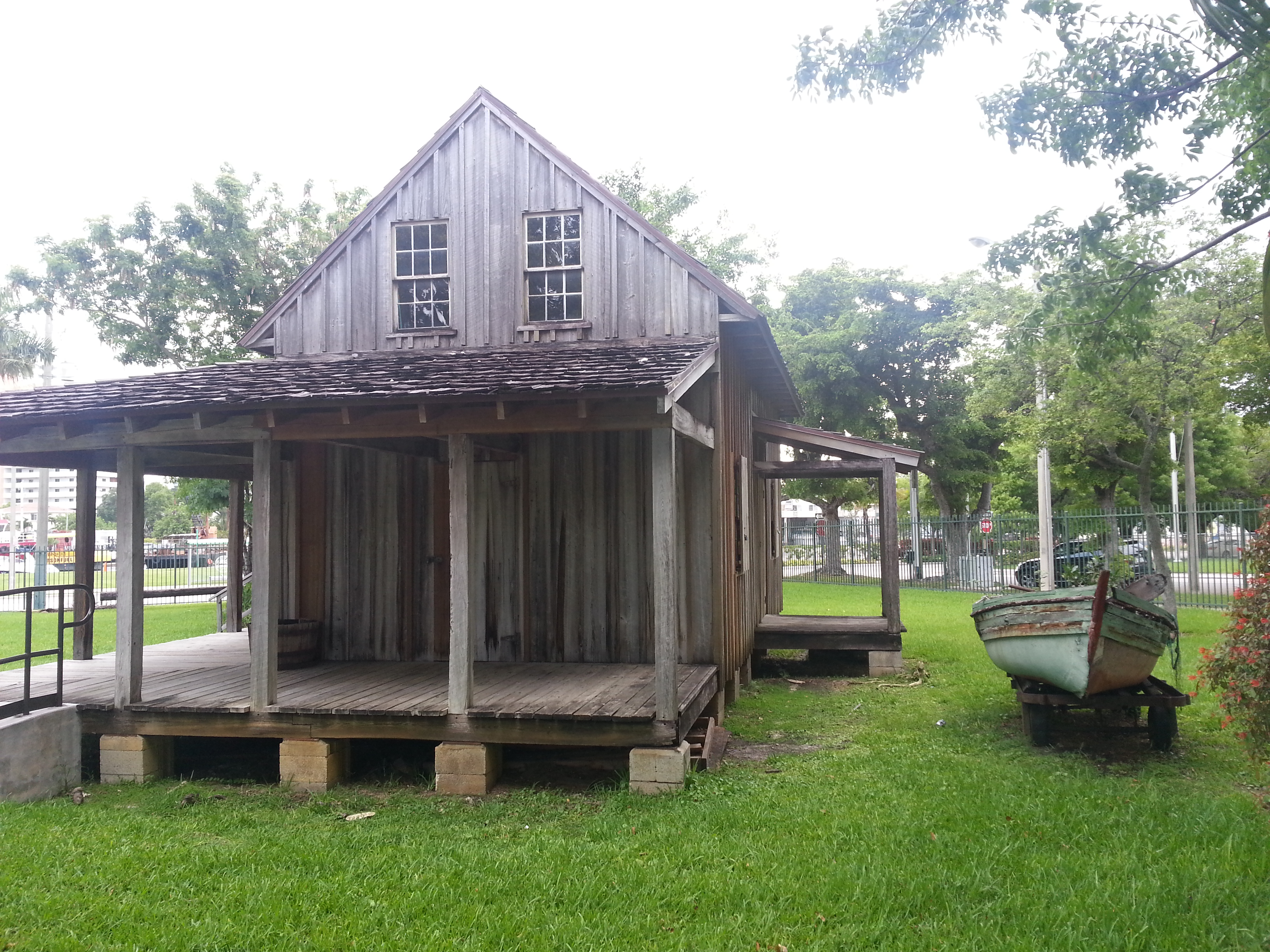
Wagner homestead
