= 1921 Miami mayoral election =

- July 12, 1921
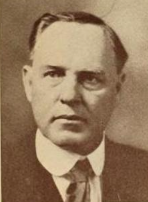
Candidate	J.E. Lummus	J.H. Gilman	C.D. Leffler
vote	4,071	3,724	3,706
percentage	12.25%	11.20%	11.14%
Candidate	J.I. Wilson	E.C. Romfh	J.B. Orr
vote	3,642	3,437	3,221
Mayor before election
W.P. Smith
Elected mayor
C.D. Leffler

The 1921 Miami mayoral election took place on July 12, 1921, to elect the mayor of Miami, Florida.

This was an off-year election.

Incumbent W.P. Smith was not on the ballot. Instead, 10 other candidates vied for seats on the city council, which would lead to the selection of a mayor. The city charter was amended earlier that year to adopt the commission-manager form of government.

Charles Doyle Leffler 'Uncle Charlie' was chosen by his city council peers as Miami's 10th Mayor.

== See also ==
- List of mayors of Miami
- Government of Miami
