= Perrine Palmer Jr. =

American politician

Perrine Palmer Jr

23rd Mayor of Miami
- In office 1945–1947
- Preceded by: Leonard K. Thomson
- Succeeded by: Robert L Floyd

Personal details
- Born: 1910
- Died: 1989 (aged 78–79) Miami, Florida, US
- Resting place: Woodlawn Park North, Miami
- Party: Democratic
- Spouse: Gwendolyn Palmer
- Children: Nancy Tucker, Katherine Hartnett, Perrine Palmer III
- Profession: Construction

Perrine Palmer Jr (1910-1989) was a developer and the City of Miami's 23rd Mayor.

The Perrine family are considered Florida pioneers. Palmer was the great-great-grandson of horticulturalist Dr Henry Perrine who moved to the Florida Keys in the 1830s.

Palmer was famously the builder of the Hollywood Greyhound dog track and the library at Bayfront Park, Miami.

Palmer was active in politics. He advised Florida Governor, C Farris Bryant during the 1960 election. After his own election to the Miami City Commission in 1945, Palmer was named Mayor. At the end of his term as Mayor he was succeeded by his friend, Robert Floyd.

Palmer is buried at Woodlawn Park North in Miami.

== See also ==
- List of mayors of Miami
- Government of Miami
- History of Miami

Political offices
Preceded by Leonard K Thomson	Mayor of the City of Miami; 1945-1947	Succeeded by Robert L Floyd
