= William M. Wolfarth =

American politician

25th Mayor of Miami
- In office 1949–1951
- Preceded by: Robert L. Floyd
- Succeeded by: Chelsie J. Senerchia

Personal details
- Born: June 30, 1906 Joplin, Jasper County, Missouri, US
- Died: March 25, 1993 (aged 86) Miami
- Spouse: Mary Agnes Galhouse

William Michael Wolfarth (30 June 1906 – 25 March 1993 in Miami, Florida) was a commissioner and mayor of Miami.

In 1936, he married Mary Agnes Galhouse of Atlanta. They had six children and celebrated the renewal of their marriage vows in 1986 at Gesu Catholic Church.

Wolfarth grew up in Chicago and moved to Miami in 1934. In 1935, he opened the first of a chain of bakeries (Cushman Bakeries). From 1949 to 1951, he was the Mayor of the City of Miami and from 1951 to 1953 he served as a commissioner (his mother-in-law, Anne Galhouse, served as his secretary). He was responsible for building the original Art Deco main public Library in downtown Miami, which was later torn down. In addition, he built the Morningside pool which still bears a plaque commemorating him. In 1959, he ran for mayor again against Robert King High on a platform to keep Miami segregated and lost the election.

== Electoral history ==
City Commissioner

General election, Miami, FL 1949

Candidate	Votes	%
WM Wolfarth	25,518	19.04
Perrine Palmer Jr	24,289	18.12
Louie Bandel	23,777	17.74
H Leslie Quigg	22,916	17.10
Leonard K Thomson	22,826	17.03
James A Dunn	14,675	10.95
Total Votes	134,001	99.98%

== See also ==
- List of mayors of Miami
- Government of Miami
- History of Miami
