= Coconut Grove Convention Center =

Indoor arena and exhibition hall in Miami

Coordinates: 25.728391°N 80.236465°W

- Interactive map of Coconut Grove Convention Center
- Former names: Dinner Key Auditorium (1951-80s)
- Address: 2700 S Bayshore Dr; Miami, FL 33133
- Location: Coconut Grove
- Owner: C⁪ity of Miami
- Capacity: 6,900

Construction
- Opened: January 24, 1951
- Renovated: 1978
- Closed: March 2004
- Demolished: November 5, 2013

Tenants
- Miami Floridians (ABA) (1969-70); Florida Jets (NRD) (1970)

The Coconut Grove Convention Center (formerly the Dinner Key Auditorium, also known as the Coconut Grove Expo Center) was an indoor arena and exhibition hall in Miami, Florida. It originally had been built as a hangar at International Pan American Airport in Dinner Key. The venue closed in 2005 and was used as a production studio for six years. The building was demolished in 2013 and the site is now home to Regatta Park.

== History ==
The building opened in 1917 as a hangar of the Dinner Key Naval Air Facility. The base was decommissioned in 1945 and sold to the city a year later. The main hangar was converted in 1950 into a non-air conditioned exhibition hall that doubled as an arena.

This was the site of the March 1, 1969 incident in which Jim Morrison of The Doors was arrested for allegedly exposing himself to the audience.

The Miami Floridians of the American Basketball Association played some of their home games at the auditorium in the 1969–70 season. Because the building was not air-conditioned, management would throw open the doors, forcing players to adjust their shots by the ocean breezes that whistled onto the court. The team finished with a 23–61 record later rebranding themselves to just The Floridians for their final two seasons of existence.

More recently, Burn Notice, a USA Network drama series, used the Convention Center for production of the show. In 2012, however, Miami City Commissioner Marc Sarnoff expressed a desire to raze the Center and build a bay-front park, noting a $1.8 million city cache in grant dollars for the project.

For the seventh and final season in 2013, USA Network agreed to use the Center with an increase of its rent from $240,000 to $450,000 a year -- just enough to cover the city's demolition costs, plus taxes, a studio spokeswoman confirmed. The Coconut Grove Convention Center was torn down in November 2013.
