= Miami City Hall =

- Pan American Seaplane Base and Terminal Building
- U.S. National Register of Historic Places
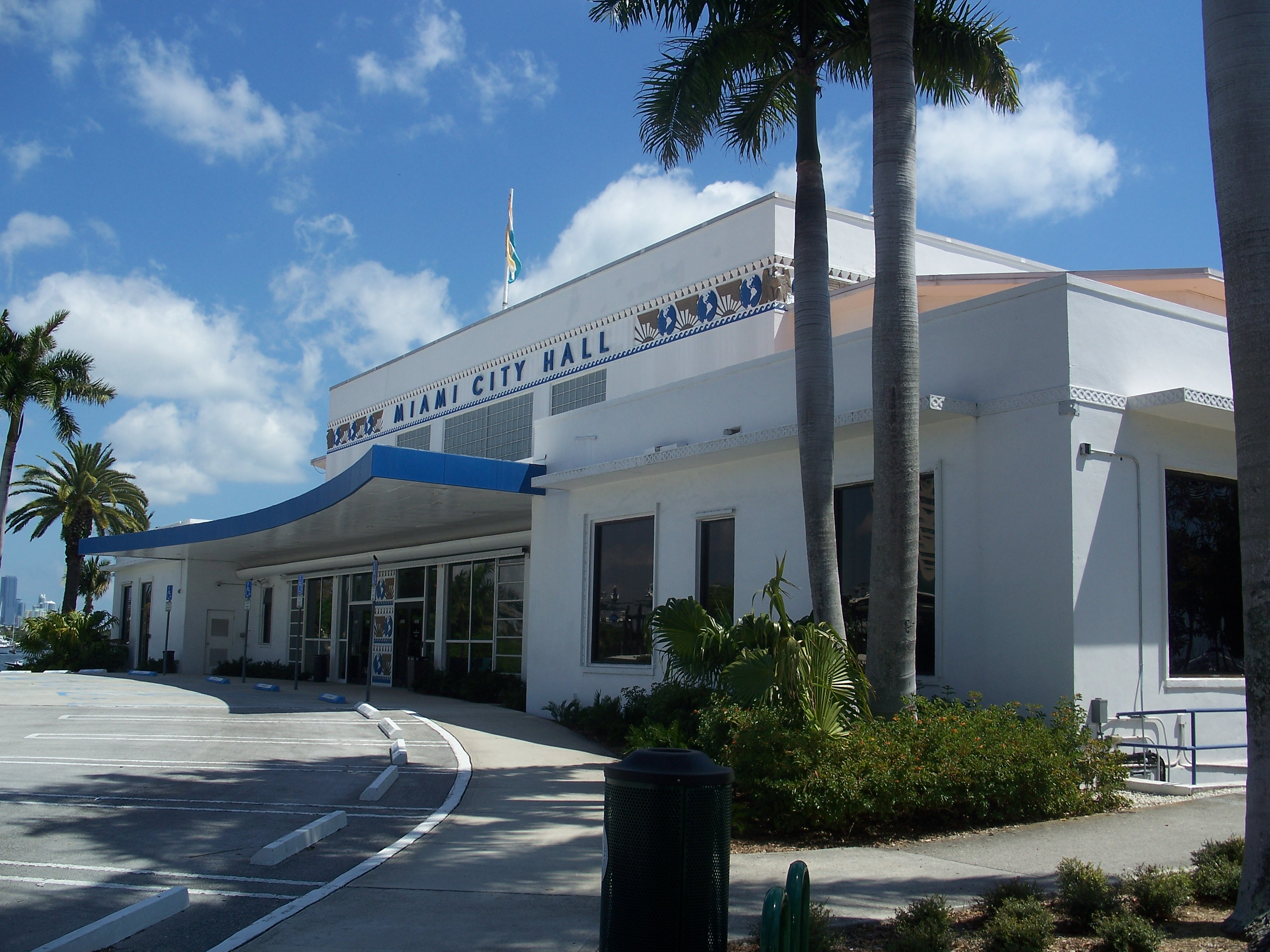
- Miami City Hall, former Pan American Terminal Building, in 2011

- Location within Miami Location within Florida Location within the United States
- Location: 3500 Pan American Dr., Miami, Florida
- Coordinates: 25.72773°N 80.2338°W
- Area: 10 acres (4.0 ha)
- Built: 1934; 92 years ago Built by Fred Howland Inc.
- NRHP reference No.: 75000548
- Added to NRHP: February 20, 1975

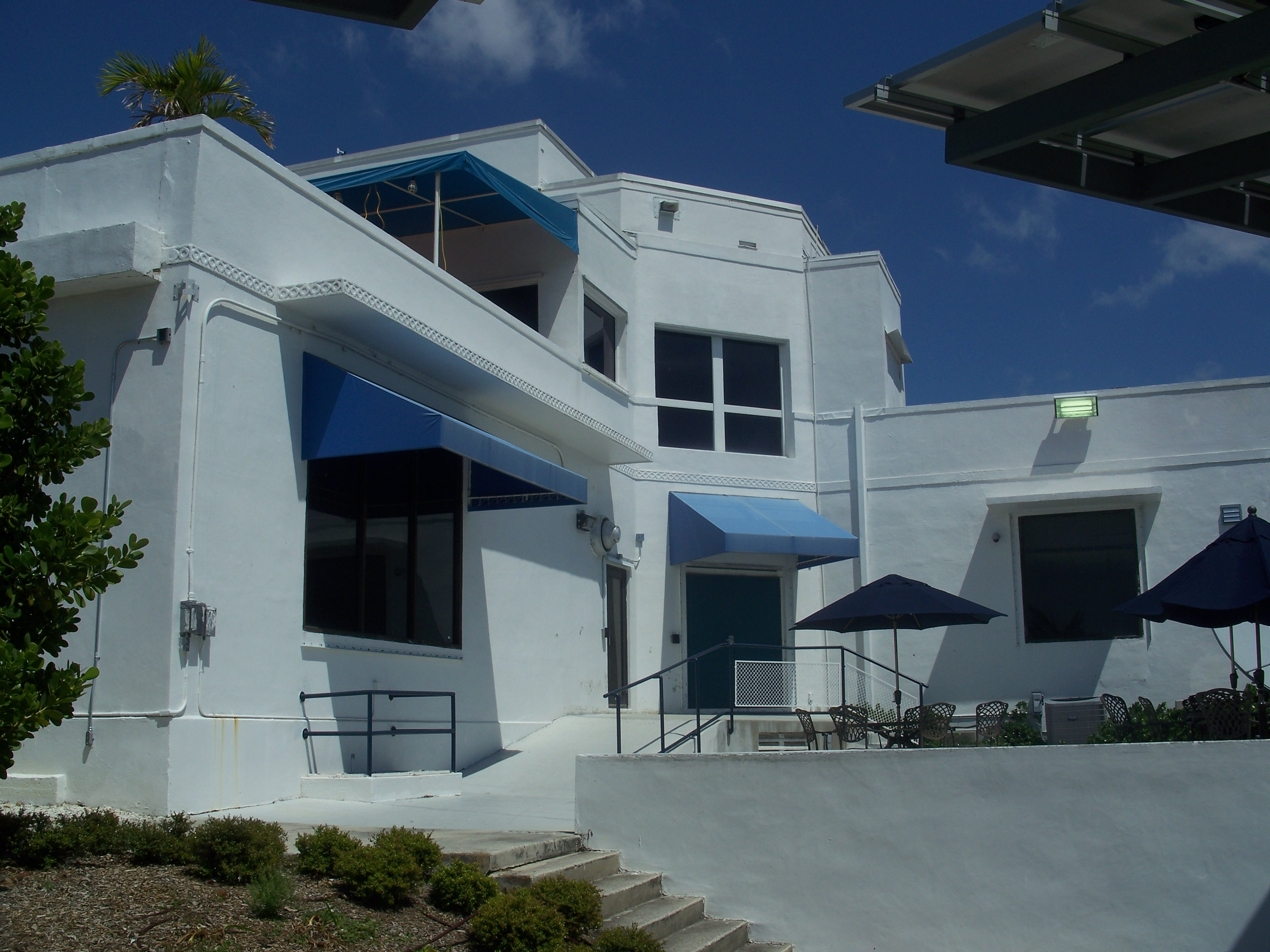
Miami City Hall

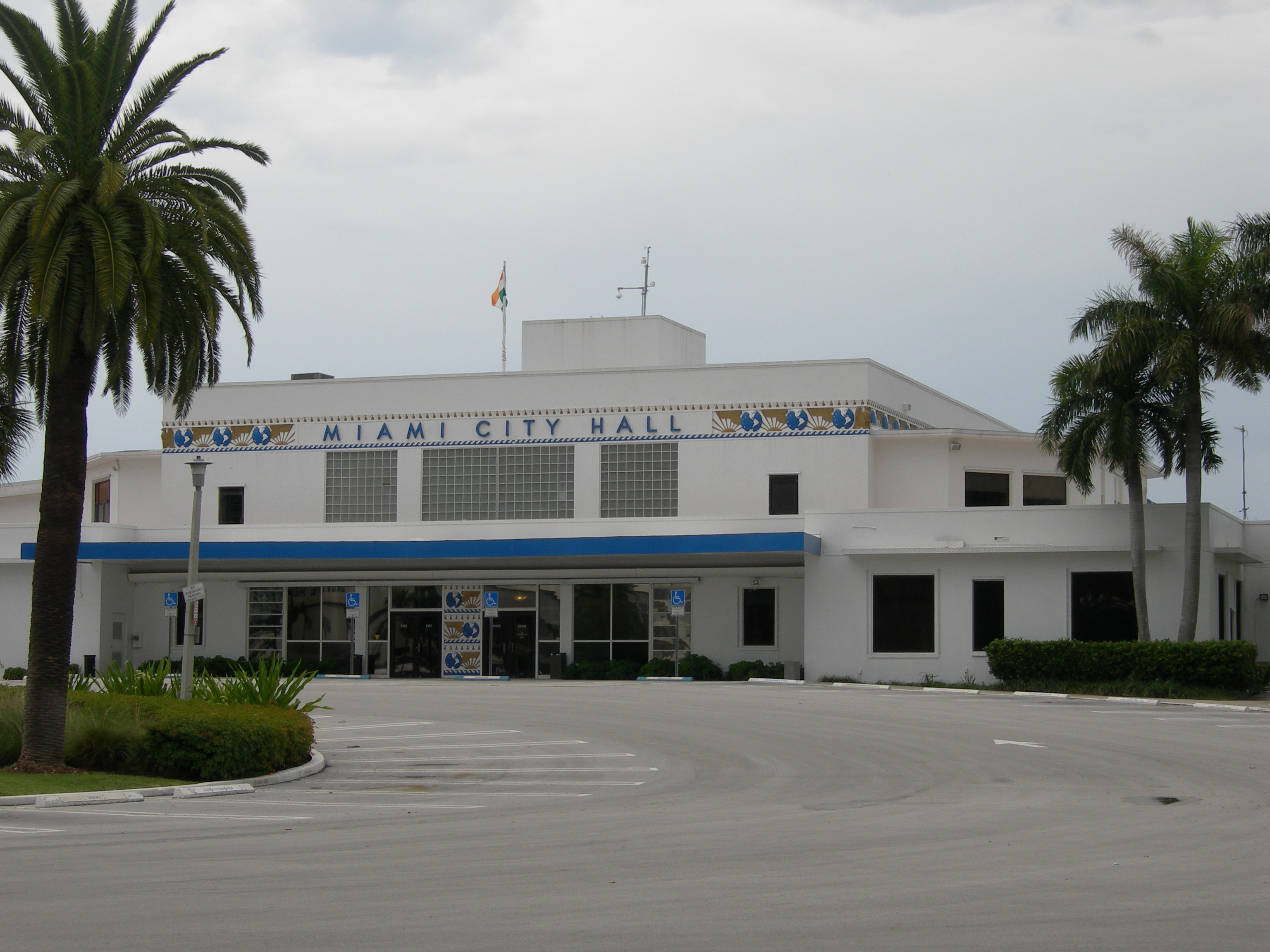
Miami City Hall

Miami City Hall is the local government headquarters for the City of Miami, Florida. Since 1954, the city government headquarters has been located in the former Pan American Airlines Terminal Building on Dinner Key, which was designed by Delano & Aldrich and constructed in 1934 for the former International Pan American Airport. This building is located in the Coconut Grove neighborhood of the city. Prior to 1954, the city government headquarters had been located in Downtown Miami for 58 years.

== History ==
An early city hall located in downtown on Flagler Street (formerly "Twelfth Street") just southeast of the Florida East Coast Railroad Miami depot and designed by Walter De Garmo was in use from 1907 until 1928. Miami's city hall was then relocated one block north, and housed in the newly constructed Dade County Courthouse from 1928 until it was moved to its current Coconut Grove location in 1954.

The terminal building was added to the U.S. National Register of Historic Places on February 20, 1975.

Pan Am's final flight to Dinner Key took place August 9, 1945 as seaplane use decreased with the construction of landing fields (airports) in Latin America.

== Gallery ==
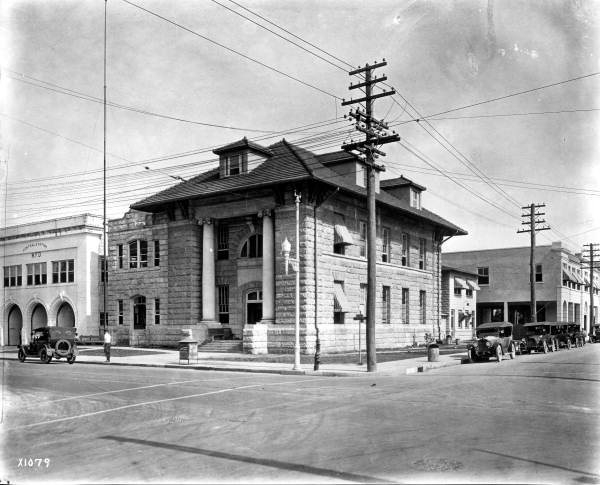
Miami City Hall in 1923, located at the southeast corner of West Flagler Street and First Avenue, designed by Walter De Garmo

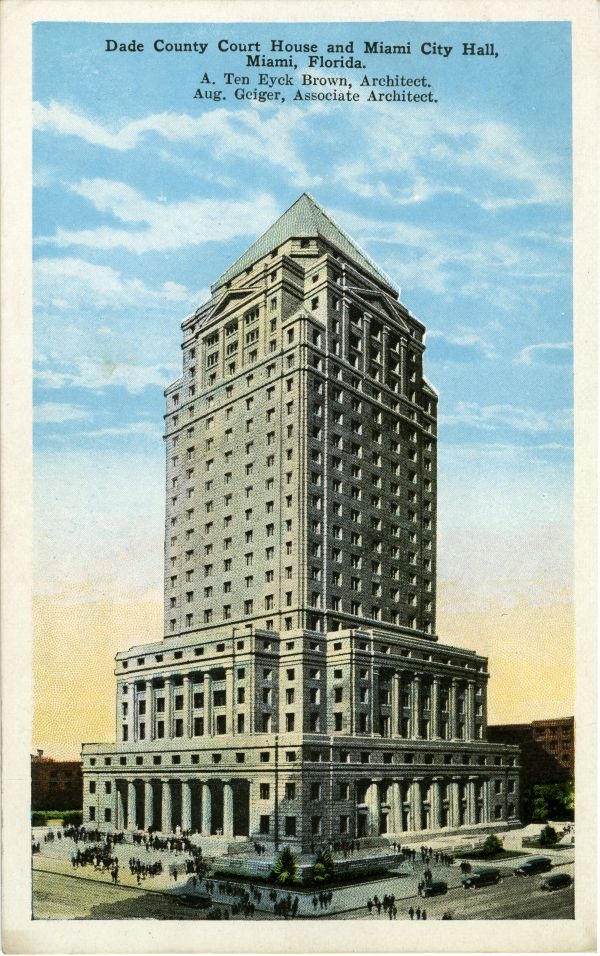
Dade County Courthouse and Miami City Hall, circa 1933

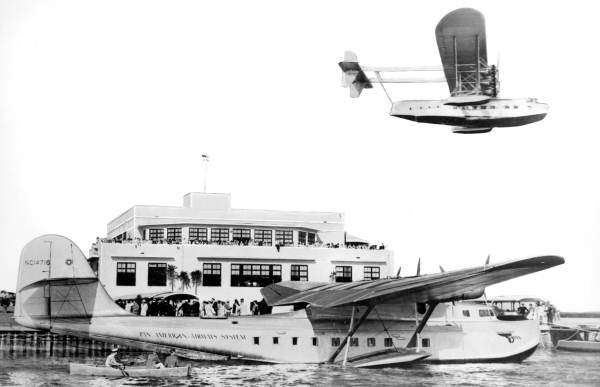
Seaplanes and terminal

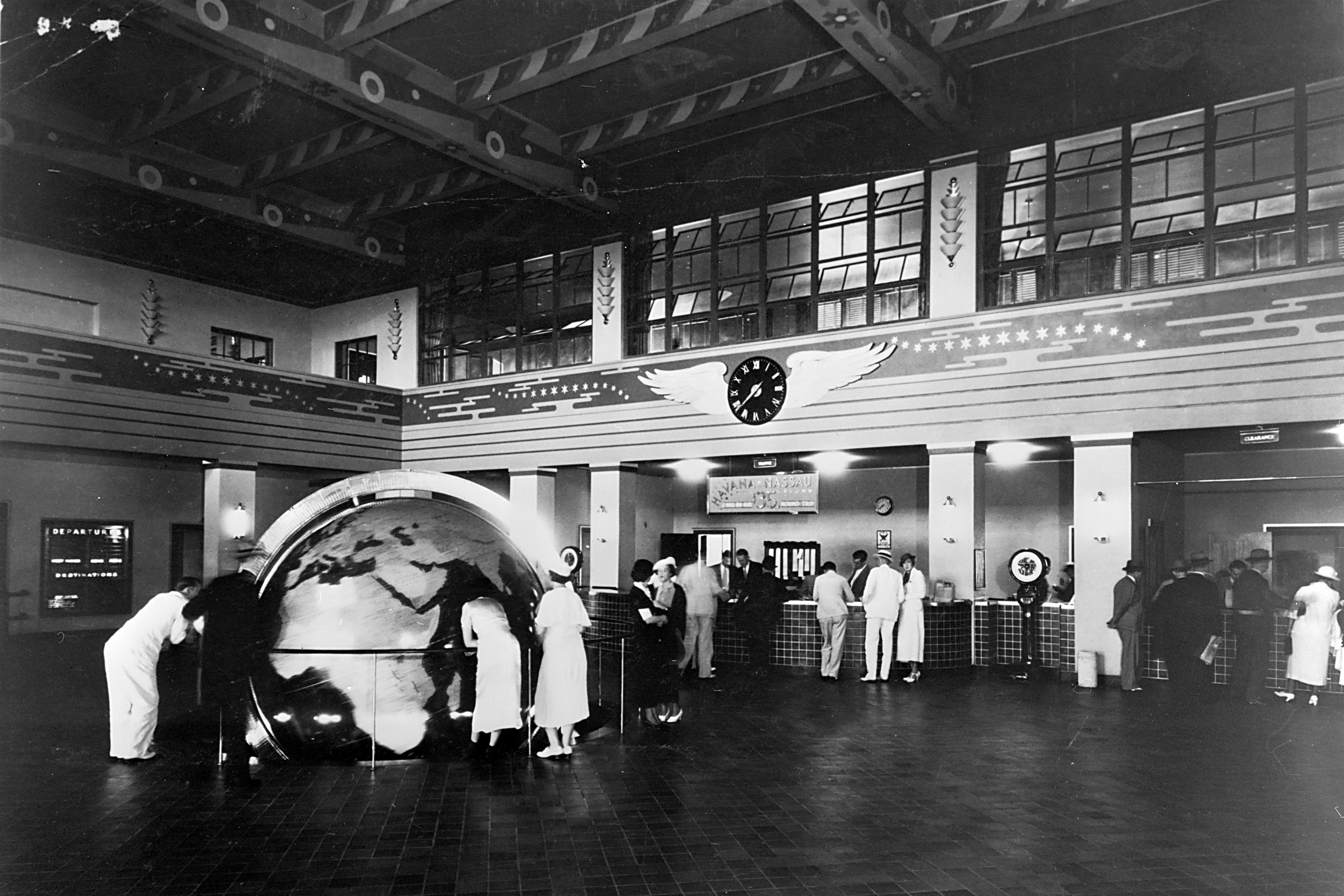
Pan Am terminal at Dinner Key in 1944

== See also ==
- Government of Miami
- List of mayors of Miami
- Coast Guard Air Station Dinner Key
