= Randy Christmas =

American politician (1920–1969)

- 1943 military portrait of Christmas

28th Mayor of Miami
- In office 1955–1957
- Preceded by: Abe Aronovitz
- Succeeded by: Robert King High

Member of the Miami City Commission
- In office 1953–1955

Personal details
- Born: October 14, 1920 Ocilla, Georgia, U.S.
- Died: July 27, 1969 (aged 48) Miami, Florida, U.S.
- Spouse: Joyce Lorraine Eloise Ronzheimer Potter
- Education: University of Miami Law School
- Occupation: Attorney, politician

Military service
- Branch/service: U.S. Marine Corps
- Battles/wars: World War II: Pacific Theater

Randall Norton Christmas (October 14, 1920 – July 27, 1969) was an American politician and attorney who served as the 28th mayor of Miami from 1955 to 1957.

== Early life and education ==
Christmas was born on October 14, 1920, in Ocilla, Georgia, In 1926, the Christmas family relocated to Miami. The sixth of seven siblings, Christmas began working as a young boy delivering the Miami Herald.

He attended Edison High School, where he graduated in 1938. Christmas served with the U.S. Marine Corps VMB443 in a B-25 bomber in the Pacific Theater during World War II, where he met and became acquainted with George Smathers, later a U.S. senator from Florida. As a student at the University of Miami in 1948, he became a charter member of the Beta Delta chapter of Phi Kappa Tau fraternity. In 1951, Christmas graduated from the University of Miami School of Law.

== Career ==
Christmas served on the Miami City Commission from 1953 to 1955.

He served as mayor from 1955 to 1957, having been elected in 1955. He was the first to hold Miami's current (directly elected) office of mayor (previous mayors had been appointed from the city commission).

In 1956, he appeared in the beginning of the movie Miami Exposé.

Christmas later served as an assistant state's attorney from 1960 to 1964, and then as an attorney in private practice until his death.

== Death ==
Christmas died on July 27, 1969.

He is interred at Southern Memorial Cemetery in North Miami Beach, Florida. Merrie Christmas Park in the Coconut Grove section of Miami is named for Christmas' daughter, Merrie, who died at age 15 in 1969.

== See also ==
- List of mayors of Miami
- Government of Miami
- History of Miami
- Timeline of Miami

Political offices
Preceded by Abe Aronovitz	Mayor of the City of Miami; 1955–1957	Succeeded by Robert King High
