= A. D. H. Fossey =

Miami mayor

A.D.H. Fossey

17th Mayor of Miami
- In office 1935–1937
- Preceded by: E. G. Sewell
- Succeeded by: Robert R. Williams

Personal details
- Born: 1876
- Died: 1959 (aged 82–83) Miami, Florida, US
- Spouse: Annie Eliza Soal
- Children: Constance Margaret Fossey, Ralph Fossey, Clifford Fossey, Herbert Fossey

Alexander Donald Henry "A.D.H." Fossey (1876-1959) was a British-born, American politician who served as the 17th mayor of Miami from 1935 to 1937.

== Early life ==
Fossey was born near Margate England. He married his wife Eliza in 1903. He was a member of the Merchant Marine. In 1906 they moved to the U.S. together.

Fossey was President of the Miami Board of Realtors. He was affiliated with the Orange Bowl committee.

He owned a fruitpacking and fertilizer business and was successful until the Great Depression.

== Politics ==
Fossey was elected to the city commission in 1933. This set him up to be mayor. In 1935 Fossey was named city mayor by the city commission. The Miami Herald disagreed with his elevation in a May 23, 1935 editorial. Fossey was accused of real estate fraud while still in office.

The Fosseys had four children. Their son, Ralph Fossey worked in real estate and entered politics like his father, notably becoming Dade County Commissioner and later Mayor of the controversial town of Islandia, FL.

== See also ==
- List of mayors of Miami
- Government of Miami
- History of Miami
- Timeline of Miami

Political offices
Preceded by E. G. Sewell	Mayor of the City of Miami; 1935-1937	Succeeded by Robert Williams
