= Leonard K. Thomson =

American politician

Leonard K Thomson

22nd Mayor of Miami
- In office 1943–1945
- Preceded by: C. H. Reeder
- Succeeded by: Perrine Palmer Jr

Personal details
- Born: 1889 Watertown, WI
- Died: 1974 (aged 84–85) Melbourne, Florida, US
- Spouse: Glena
- Children: Thomas, Carol
- Profession: Accountant

Leonard Keene Thomson (1889–1974) was an accountant, hotelier and the City of Miami's 22nd Mayor.

Thomson grew up in Wisconsin and worked since graduating 7th grade. He moved to Miami in 1925.

Thomson held a number of civic positions; President of the Florida Chamber of Commerce, Director of the Port Authority, Treasurer of the Dade County Blood Bank and city tax collector. He was only Miami Mayor for two years but also served as member of the Miami City Commission for 5 years.

Thomson was appointed to the city commission after I.D. MacVicar resigned to serve in WWII.

One of Thomson's plans was to eliminate the multiple city municipalities in Miami Dade County and consolidate them under a county government. This was an idea shared by a number of politicians, including state representative, RB Gautier. He also proposed the idea of paving over the Miami River.

When not in political office, Thompson was active in the county blood bank. He was also the manager of the Everglades Hotel and the McCalister Hotel.

== See also ==
- List of mayors of Miami
- Government of Miami
- History of Miami

Political offices
Preceded by CH Reeder	Mayor of the City of Miami; 1943-1945	Succeeded by Perrine Palmer
