= Robert R. Williams (politician) =

Miami mayor

Robert R Williams
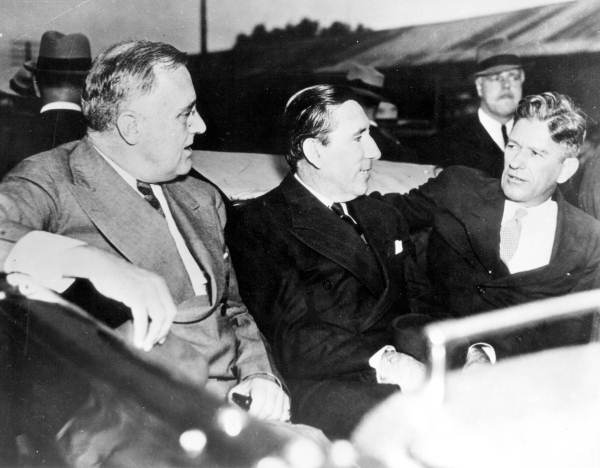
- President Franklin Delano Roosevelt rides with Senator Claude Pepper and Miami Mayor Robert Williams in 1937.

18th Mayor of Miami
- In office May 13, 1937 – March 2, 1939
- Preceded by: A. D. H. Fossey
- Succeeded by: E.G.Sewell

Miami City Commissioner (Note: During Williams tenure, the mayor of Miami was elected from amongst the Miami City Commissioners by the city commissioners.)
- In office May 14, 1935 – March 2, 1939

Justice of the Peace for Miami-Dade County's 9th district
- In office 1928 – January 1933
- Succeeded by: position disestablished

Personal details
- Born: Ocala, Florida, US
- Died: July 18, 1966 (aged 72) Miami, Florida, US

Robert R Williams was the City of Miami's 18th Mayor serving from May 13, 1937 until his successful recall on March 2, 1939.

Williams entered Miami politics in the late 1920s as a justice of the peace for Miami-Dade County and held that office until his district was eliminated by the county commission during redistricting. In May 1935, he was elected to the Miami City Commission. In 1937, the commission elected him Mayor of Miami. After he was charged and acquitted of bribery in 1938, a successful recall election removed him from office in 1939. Although he promised a political comeback, Williams did not return to office and died in 1966.

== Early life and career ==
Williams was a native of Ocala, but moved to Miami in the 1910s. He worked as a grocery clerk before opening his own grocery store. He later entered the real estate business.

== Miami politics ==
In 1928, Williams ran unopposed for the 9th justice of the peace district in Miami-Dade County. In November 1931, the 8th district was combined with his district after the resignation of A. E. Moore. Although reelected in 1932, the county commission eliminated his district and a state court ruled his district had ceased to exist in January 1933. He ran for the Miami City Commission in May 1935, placing third in the May 7 primary and advancing to the top six runoff a week later. He was elected to the Miami City Commission on May 14, 1935, alongside Orville H. Rigby and Alexander Orr Jr. with the most votes of any candidate.

=== Mayor of Miami and recall ===
He was elected Mayor of Miami on May 13, 1937. Williams and two other city commissioners, John W. DuBose and Ralph B. Ferguson, were charged with soliciting a bribe from Florida Power & Light. All three were acquitted after a few minutes of jury deliberations on November 18, 1938. Williams' administration drew the attention of the Florida Supreme Court when they tried to fire Miami City Clerk, Frank J Kelly. Kelly was reinstated and Williams and three others were held in contempt.

A recall election against Williams, DuBose, and Ferguson succeeded at removing them on March 2, 1939. The trio were known locally as the "termite administration." During the recall election he appointed his secretary, Anna Perry, as the first woman to serve on the Miami City Commission. She replaced Alexander Orr Jr., who had resigned in protest of the city clerk's firing.

== Later life and death ==
In 1939, he opened a tire shop and promised a political "comeback." He ran for a seat on the Miami City Commission in 1941.

Williams died on July 18, 1966.

== See also ==
- List of mayors of Miami
- Government of Miami
- History of Miami
- Timeline of Miami
