= Robert L. Floyd =

American politician

Florida House of Representatives
- In office 1951–1953

24th Mayor of Miami
- In office 1947–1949
- Preceded by: Perrine Palmer Jr.
- Succeeded by: William M. Wolfarth

Personal details
- Born: January 4, 1918 Cincinnati, Ohio
- Died: May 14, 2007 (aged 89) Miami, Florida
- Party: Democratic
- Spouse: Rose Marie Norcross
- Children: 4
- Education: University of Florida; American University

Robert Lester Floyd (January 4, 1918 – May 14, 2007) was a community leader and US politician best known as the youngest mayor of the City of Miami.

Floyd was born on January 4, 1918, in Cincinnati, Ohio, to Paul Leslie Floyd and Margaret Scott and moved to Miami as a child with his mother in 1925 when he had health issues. He worked as a Paperboy for the Miami News and became an Eagle Scout. He graduated from Miami High School and earned a degree from the University of Florida. In 1939, he went to Washington, DC for a job with the FBI. After graduating from Washington College of Law American University, he became an FBI Special Agent and was the first responder in the Nazi Saboteurs and George Dasch case in DC. When the war ended in 1945, he left the FBI and returned to Miami and start a private legal practice. On September 4, 1946, he married Miami native Rose Marie Norcross.

He served as a member of the Miami City Commission and in 1947, he ran for Mayor of the City of Miami and won at the age of 29. Upon his election, he was the city's first-ever Democratic mayor. He was one of the Junior Chamber of Commerce Five Outstanding Young Men in Florida in 1947 and Ten Outstanding Young Men in America in 1949 (Class with Gerald Ford). In 1951- 1953, he was elected to the Florida House of Representatives and received the Allen Morris Award as outstanding first term Representative. In 1954 and 1960, he was elected (unopposed) as a Dade County court judge. In 1962, He was elected as President of the Florida Circuit Judges Conference. In 1963, he joined the firm of Frates, Fay and Floyd, later Floyd, Pearson, et al, and eventually Richman, Greer et al. He served as City Attorney for North Miami 1962-1966, Dade Country Bar Association President, in 1966 he served for one month as interim Dade County Sheriff, in 1966- 1967 President of the Society of Former Special Agents of the FBI and an American University Trustee.

He was admitted to the Florida, District of Columbia and U.S. Supreme Court Bars. He served on the Board of Governors of the Florida Bar and the House of Delegates of the American Bar Association. He was a Fellow of the American College of Trial Lawyers and the International Academy of Trial Lawyers. He was President of the Florida Bar for 1978-79. He was an active member of numerous community and fraternal organizations, including the Scottish Rite of Freemasonry in Miami (33 degree), Chi Phi and Delta Theta Phi Law fraternities, University of Florida Blue Key, BPOE, Lion's Club, and Royal Order of Jesters. Next to his family, he was most proud of being a limited partner of the Miami Dolphins (1968-1985) and wearing his 1972 Super Bowl Ring.

"He helped establish Miami as one of America's premiere cities. With his demise, part of Old Miami passed into history. Together with his beloved Rose Marie, they embarked on a journey dedicated to a love of family and devotion to civic service." Floyd once wrote in the Florida Bar Journal, "It is not required that we(attorneys) be loved but that we be entitled to respect for the significant examples of moral, ethical, and legal worth revealed in and by our labors." He is survived by 4 children: Brig Gen Robert L. Floyd II, Jr, Edward R. Floyd, Rosemarie Floyd Nemeth and James N. Floyd and 7 grandchildren.

== See also ==
- List of mayors of Miami
- Government of Miami
- History of Miami
