= E. G. Sewell =

American politician

13th Mayor of Miami
- In office 1927–1929
- Preceded by: Edward C. Romfh
- Succeeded by: C. H. Reeder

16th Mayor of Miami
- In office 1933–1935
- Preceded by: R.B. Gautier
- Succeeded by: A. D. H. Fossey

19th Mayor of Miami
- In office 1939–1940
- Preceded by: Robert R. Williams
- Succeeded by: Alexander Orr, Jr.

Personal details
- Born: September 17, 1874 Hartwell, Georgia
- Died: April 2, 1940 (aged 65) Jackson Memorial Hospital; Miami, Florida
- Spouse: Adele M. Wait

Everest George "E. G." Sewell (September 17, 1874 – April 2, 1940) was a merchant and three-time Mayor of Miami, serving as the city's 13th, 16th and 19th mayor.

The four Sewell brothers (E.G., Herbert, John and Jerehmiah) were sons of Mary Albina Gaines Sewell and Jeremiah Washington Sewell, a Confederate veteran and medical doctor.

E. G. and his brother, John Sewell moved to Miami on March 3, 1896, and opened one of the city's first stores north of the Miami River on March 26, 1896.

In February 1916, he was elected as president of Miami Chamber of Commerce and was re-elected every year until 1925 (except for 1919). He was elected as Mayor of Miami in 1927 (until 1929), 1933 (until 1935), 1939 (in recall election for 2 months), and lastly 1939 (until his death in 1940). Under his leadership the chamber of commerce published, The Miamian, a monthly newspaper dedicated to promoting the city abroad. Sewell was considered a, "super promoter," when it came to Miami.

Notably, it is believed he was the first Miami resident to fly in an airplane.

He died two days after suffering a heart attack on April 2, 1940, at Jackson Memorial Hospital.

There is a city of Miami nature park named after him: E. G. Sewell Park located at 1801 NW South River Drive.

== See also ==
- List of mayors of Miami
- Government of Miami
- History of Miami
- Timeline of Miami

Political offices
Preceded by Edward C Romfh	Mayor of the City of Miami; 1927-1929	Succeeded by C.H. Reeder
Preceded by R.B. Gautier	Mayor of the City of Miami; 1933-1935	Succeeded by A. D. H. Fossey
Preceded by Robert R. Williams	Mayor of the City of Miami; 1939-1940	Succeeded by Alexander Orr Jr.
