= C. D. Leffler =

American politician (1868–1939)

Charles D. Leffler
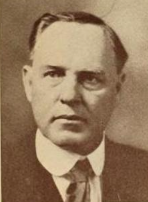

10th Mayor of Miami
- In office July 1921 – June 1923
- Preceded by: W.P. Smith
- Succeeded by: P.A. Henderson

Personal details
- Born: August 12, 1868 Kentucky, US
- Died: April 27, 1939 (aged 70) Miami, Florida, US
- Party: Democratic
- Children: Cornelia Leffler, Charles D. Leffler Jr.
- Profession: Banker

Military service
- Branch/service: State Militia
- Rank: Captain
- Unit: Gate City Rifles, Florida State Troops
- Commands: D Co, FLARNG
- Battles/wars: Spanish–American War, WWI

Charles Doyle Leffler 'Uncle Charlie' (August 12, 1868 - April 27, 1939) was a business leader and politician. He was the city of Miami's 10th Mayor.

== Early life ==
Leffler was born in Smithland, Kentucky, and was the son of a Confederate Army non-commissioned officer. The Leffler family came to Florida in 1877 and Leffler spent his childhood in the city of Sanford. He served in the Gate City Rifles from the Orange County battalion of the Florida National Guard around the time of the Spanish-American War but the war ended before he was scheduled to be sent to Cuba. He attended the University of the South and later worked in the South Florida Railroad Company. Leffler enlisted for WWI in May 2017 but was soon commissioned as a LT.

Leffler held interests in a paving company, the Gulf Refining Company and the Miami Bank & Trust Company.

== Public service ==
In 1904 Leffler was elected to the Miami board of public works, serving for two years. He later became treasurer of the board of bond trustees of Dade County. He was also chairman of the Democratic Committee for Dade County. He was city commissioner, and President of the Miami Chamber of Commerce.

The City of Miami charter was amended in January 1921 to change the executive position to a commission-city manager system. Leffler was chosen by his fellow Miami City Commission members to be the first mayor under the new system in the City of Miami election of 1921.

A petition and lawsuit were filed with the local court to keep the serving city commissioners including Leffler, J.E. Lummus, E.C. Romfh and J.I. Wilson, from being on the ballot in 1923. All the men were local bankers. They advertised and campaigned together. The courts eventually sided with the incumbents, allowing them to continue their hold on Miami government into the late 1930's.

== Philanthropic and civic activities ==
Leffler was active in the Rotary Club, the Rod and Reel Club, the Biscayne Bay Yacht Club the Propeller Club and the Everglades National Park Association.

Leffler was considered a Miami Pioneer by his contemporaries. They honored him and his many contributions to the city posthumously.

== See also ==
- List of mayors of Miami
- Government of Miami
- History of Miami

Political offices
Preceded by W.P. Smith	Mayor of the City of Miami; 1921-1923	Succeeded by P.A. Henderson
