= Alexander Orr Jr. =

American politician (1877–1958)

20th Mayor of Miami
- In office 1940–1941
- Preceded by: E.G.Sewell
- Succeeded by: C.H. Reeder

Personal details
- Born: Alexander Orr Jr. December 26, 1877 Glasgow, Scotland
- Died: March 15, 1958 Miami, Florida, U.S.
- Spouse: Isabella Forrester
- Children: Alexander Orr III, Eadie Forrester, Jessie Forrester, Christina Forrester
- Profession: Plumber

Alexander Orr Jr. (1877–1958) was an American politician, plumber, and city commissioner who served as the 20th mayor of Miami from 1940 to 1941.

== Biography ==
Alexander Orr arrived in Miami in 1914 with his parents and six of his 11 siblings.

Orr was a plumber by trade and was a deacon of the Presbyterian Church. At the time of his death, his company was one of the largest plumbing contractors in the southeast US. He was elected to the Miami City Commission on May 14, 1935, alongside Orville H. Rigby and Robert R. Williams.

Orr became city mayor in 1940, upon the death of E. G. Sewell. " Orr worked hardest for two life-long interests — protection of Miami’s water supply and consolidaton of government functions for more efficiency." The Alexander Orr, Jr. Water Treatment Plant, Miami-Dade County's largest potable water production facility is named in his honor.

Orr was the uncle of another Florida politician, Dade County Mayor and State Representative, John B Orr, Jr.

== Fraternal affiliations ==
Throughout his life, Orr was affiliated with many organizations, including the Scottish Free Masons, Shriners, Scottish Rite Masons, Knights Templar, Rotary Club and the Worshipful Company of Plumbers of London. He was also a pioneer member of the South Florida Boy Scout council.

== See also ==
- List of mayors of Miami
- Government of Miami
- History of Miami
- Timeline of Miami

Political offices
Preceded by E.G.Sewell	Mayor of the City of Miami; 1940-1941	Succeeded by C.H. Reeder
