= Abe Aronovitz =

American politician (1898–1960)

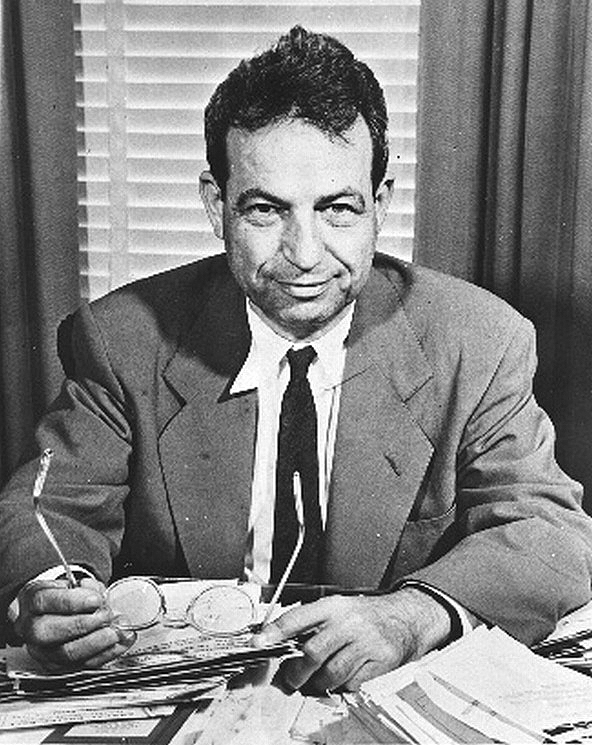
- portrait photograph, circa 1953

27th Mayor of Miami
- In office 1953–1955
- Preceded by: Chelsie J. Senerchia
- Succeeded by: Randy Christmas

Personal details
- Born: October 15, 1898 New York, New York, U.S.
- Died: July 11, 1960 (aged 61) Miami, Florida, U.S.
- Spouse: Dorothy Aronovitz
- Profession: Attorney

Abraham "Abe" Aronovitz (October 15, 1898 – July 11, 1960) was an American lawyer and politician who served one term as mayor of Miami, Florida, from 1953 until 1955. He had a seat on the City Commission until 1958.

== Background ==
Aronovitz was born on October 15, 1898, in New York City. He was one of six sons of Romanian Jewish immigrants, David and Kate Aronovitz. He was raised in Key West, Florida and graduated from Palm Beach High School. He graduated from Stetson University. He later was the uncle of Sidney Aronovitz (1920–1988), the US District Judge for the Southern District of Florida (1976–1988).

== Political career ==
In the 1920s, Aronovitz was living in Jacksonville, Florida, where he became active in politics. He ran for and lost the election for a seat on the Jacksonville city commission.

Aronovitz moved to Miami, which was developing more rapidly. In 1926 he was appointed as acting State Attorney. In 1927, he ran for and lost the election for a seat on the City Commission of Miami. In the 1930s he was appointed as Miami City Attorney.

Aronovitz worked in private practice for years. He returned to politics, gaining election as mayor of Miami in 1952, and serving one term from 1953 through 1955. He was the only Jewish mayor of either city or county government for Miami until the election of Daniella Levine Cava as county mayor in 2020.

After the end of his city mayoralty in November 1955, DuBreuil resigned his seat on the city commission, due to health issues related to having suffered a heart attack.

Aronovitz acted as a mentor to Robert King High, recruiting him to run for mayor. The younger man won election in 1957, and was re-elected for several terms. He supported the 1960 gubernatorial campaign of Doyle Carlton. He was influential in developing plans to guide the growth of Miami.

Aronovitz was elected again to a seat on the city Commission, and served until 1958. He had to resign because of health problems. Several months later he traveled to Cuba with his family. They were staying at the Havana Hilton Hotel in Havana, when the dictatorship of Fulgencio Batista fell on 1 January 1959.

Aronovitz' political legacy spanned many more years than his terms of office. He was credited with helping several politicians gain office. He was memorialized as an upstanding individual who helped many citizens.

== See also ==
- List of mayors of Miami
- Government of Miami
- History of Miami
- Timeline of Miami

Political offices
Preceded by Chelsie J. Senerchia	Mayor of the City of Miami; 1953–1955	Succeeded by Randy Christmas
