= J. W. Watson Sr. =

American politician

John W. Watson Sr.

Florida State Senator - 13th District
- In office 1925–1935

Florida House of Representatives- Dade
- In office 1907–1919
- Preceded by: Graham W King
- Succeeded by: Ben C Willard

8th Mayor of Miami
- In office November, 1917 – November, 1919
- Preceded by: P.A. Henderson
- Succeeded by: W.P. Smith

6th Mayor of Miami
- In office July 18, 1912 – November, 1915
- Preceded by: Samuel Rodmond Smith
- Succeeded by: P.A. Henderson

Florida's House of Representatives - Dade
- In office 1907–1909
- Preceded by: Graham W. King
- Succeeded by: George O Butler

Speaker of the Florida House of Representatives
- In office 1901–1901
- Preceded by: Robert McNamee
- Succeeded by: Cromwell Gibbons

Florida's House of Representatives - Osceola
- In office 1897–1905
- Preceded by: J. E. Moseley
- Succeeded by: Arthur E. Donegan

Personal details
- Born: October 31, 1859 North Carolina, US
- Died: February 8, 1942 (aged 82) Miami, Florida, US
- Party: Democratic
- Spouse: Emma Cora Chafer Watson
- Children: J.W. Watson Jr., Janet Watson Carson, Robert Osborne Watson
- Profession: Merchant

John William Watson Sr. (October 31, 1859 - February 8, 1942) was an American politician and businessman who served in a number of elected positions throughout Florida.

== Biography ==
Watson was born on October 31, 1859, in North Carolina. He studied at Raleigh Academy then traveled and worked various jobs. He eventually settled in Kissimmee, Florida where he established a hardware business and became active in local and state politics. He expanded the business to Miami and eventually moved there, building an edifice that would be known as the Watson Building, downtown.

Watson was elected as state representative for the area that included Kissimmee and later Miami. He won at least 13 popular elections. He was later elected Speaker of the Florida House of Representatives and a member of the Florida Senate and served as the City of Miami's 6th and 8th Mayor. His first Miami election was a landslide.

In between political victories, he owned a grocery store, hardware company and grapefruit grove among his multiple business endeavors.

He built several buildings in Miami which became important to the city's growth and long-term development. The Watson family is considered to be among Miami's first settlers as they arrived before the railroad to town was complete.

Watson testified before the House of Representatives' Committee on Indian Services regarding his first-hand knowledge of Seminole Indian culture and his distaste for the plans to drain the Everglades.

He ran for Florida Governor unsuccessfully in 1911–1912.

Watson Island is named after him. He died on February 8, 1942, at the age of 82, in Miami, Florida. He is buried in the Miami City Cemetery.

== Fraternal and civic affiliations ==
Fraternally he was connected with the Masonic order, the Knights of Pythias, and the Elks.

== See also ==
- Speakers of the Florida House
- List of mayors of Miami
- Government of Miami
- History of Miami

Political offices
Preceded by Robert McNamee	Speaker of the Florida House of Representatives; 1901-1901	Succeeded by Cromwell Gibbons
