= Chelsie J. Senerchia =

Italian American politician and civil engineer

26th Mayor of Miami
- In office 1951–1953
- Preceded by: William M. Wolfarth
- Succeeded by: Abe Aronovitz

Personal details
- Born: November 2, 1899 Rhode Island
- Died: June 20, 1990 (aged 90) Casselberry, Florida
- Resting place: Woodlawn Park North, Miami
- Profession: Civil engineer

Military service
- Branch/service: United States Army
- Years of service: 1914–1919, 1942–1945
- Rank: Major
- Battles/wars: WWI, WWII

Chelsie J. Senerchia (November 2, 1899 – June 20, 1990) was an Italian American politician and civil engineer. He served as city engineer, city manager, commissioner, and mayor of Miami during his political career in South Florida during the 1940s and 1950s.

He was the only son of five children of Antonio Senerchia and Julia di Fiore, both Italian immigrants who settled in Rhode Island. He served as a second lieutenant in the U.S. Army infantry during World War I, and later attended Brown University.

In 1921, he moved to Miami. He later married Leona Pierce, who was the stand-in for Alice Lake in the 1926 silent movie The Hurricane. They had two daughters, Sallye and Carol.

In 1942, he rejoined the army as an engineer during World War II and was eventually promoted to rank of major.

After the war, he accepted the position of City Engineer for the City of Miami and later became the City Manager. When the Miami City Commission fired him, he decided to run for office and won as commissioner and later Mayor of Miami.

In 1959, he became a vice-president of a local savings and loan and served for 20 years. In the 1960s he served on the state Road Board, the antecedent to the Florida Department of Transportation

== Civic Affiliations ==
Senerchia was a member of the American Legion.

== See also ==
- List of mayors of Miami
- Government of Miami
- History of Miami
- Notable members of the American Legion
