= P. A. Henderson =

American politician (1875–1925)

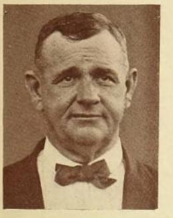

11th Mayor of Miami
- In office 1923–1925
- Preceded by: C. D. Leffler
- Succeeded by: Edward C. Romfh

7th Mayor of Miami
- In office November 1915 – November 1917
- Preceded by: J. W. Watson, Sr.
- Succeeded by: J. W. Watson, Sr.

Personal details
- Born: January 7, 1875 Hampton, Georgia, US
- Died: July 25, 1925 (aged 50) Miami, Florida, US
- Spouse: Julia McCrimmon
- Children: Parker Adair Henderson Jr. Arthur J. Henderson
- Occupation: Lumberman

Parker Adair "P. A." Henderson (January 7, 1875 – July 25, 1925) was an American politician and businessman who served as the seventh and eleventh mayor of Miami.

Henderson was born in Hampton, Georgia, where his father owned a series of successful Saw Mills. Parker was 16 when his father first in-trusted him to running one of his saw mills which he ran for 15 years. Parker moved to Miami, Florida in 1906 where he organized the McCrimmon Lumber Company with his brother-in-law C.T. McCrimmon. In 1912, Parker purchased his brother-in-law's interest in the company, renaming it P.A. Henderson Lumber Company. Parker was elected Mayor of Miami in June, 1915 taking office the following November.

He was elected again in 1923. He died in office in 1925. His death certificate said he died of apoplexy and atherosclerosis. His final resting place is Woodlawn North, Miami.

== Fraternal and civic affiliations ==
Mr. Henderson was a member of the Masonic Order, Noble of the Mystic Shrine, Benevolent and Protective order of Elks and the Hoo Hoo.

== See also ==
- List of mayors of Miami
- Government of Miami
- History of Miami
- Timeline of Miami

Political offices
Preceded by J. W. Watson, Sr.	Mayor of the City of Miami; 1915-1917	Succeeded by J. W. Watson, Sr.
Preceded by C. D. Leffler	Mayor of the City of Miami; 1923-1925	Succeeded by Edward C. Romfh
