= R. B. Gautier Jr. =

Member Florida House of Representatives

Redmond Bunn Gautier Jr.
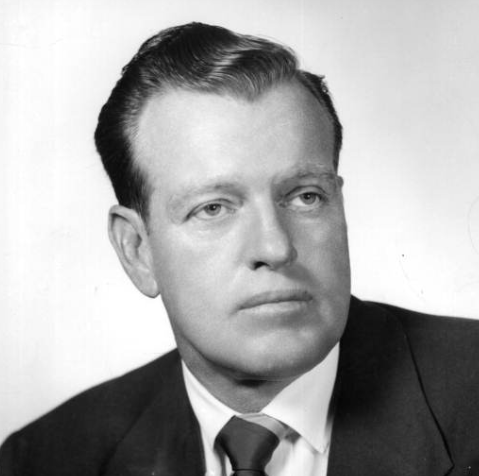

Member of the Florida Senate representing Florida's 13th District
- In office 1949–1956

Member of the Florida House of Representatives
- In office 1947–1948
- Preceded by: George Shaffer Okell, Sr
- In office 1943–1943
- Preceded by: George E Holt
- Succeeded by: William C Lantaff

Personal details
- Born: April 3, 1909 Miami, Florida, U.S.
- Died: 1989
- Party: Democrat
- Occupation: Attorney

Military service
- Allegiance: United States
- Rank: Lieutenant
- Battles/wars: WWII

Redmond Bunn 'R.B.' Gautier Jr. (April 3, 1909 – 1989) was an American lawyer and politician who served as a Florida state representative and senator.

Gautier Jr was born to City of Miami judge and later mayor, R.B. Gautier and Ida F Miller Gautier. The Gautiers were South Florida pioneers, moving to Miami shortly before its incorporation.

Gautier attended Miami High School, Riverside Military Academy and Washington and Lee University. He was elected to serve in the Florida House of Representatives from 1943 to 1945. He gave up his seat to take a commission as a Navy officer in WWII but regained his seat after the war.

Gautier was a 1956 delegate to the 1956 Democratic National Convention Gautier was a trustee for the University of Miami.
