= Edward C. Romfh =

American politician (1880–1952)

12th Mayor of Miami
- In office 1925–1927
- Preceded by: PA Henderson
- Succeeded by: EG Sewell

Miami City Commission
- In office 1921–1925

Personal details
- Born: Edward Coleman Romfh; February 8, 1880 Camden, Arkansas, U.S.
- Died: January 16, 1952 (aged 71) Miami, Florida, U.S.
- Spouse: Marie Antoinette de Camp
- Children: 3

Edward Coleman "E.C." Romfh (February 8, 1880 – January 16, 1952) was the 12th Mayor of the city of Miami. Romfh was a businessman and politician and considered one of the City of Miami's pioneers.

Romfh arrived in Miami in 1896 and established a grocery store. He was later a bookkeeper for the Bank of Bay Biscayne. This started his banking experience.

Later Romfh became president of First National Bank and served as the director of First Trust and Savings Bank. His wife was on the board of directors as well.

He famously defied the Great Depression era bank closures that befell the entire country and kept his branch open as long as possible, endearing him to many Miamians who had their money at his bank.

He was also a board member of the Miami Telephone Company, which later became part of the Southern Bell network. By every account, Romfh was successful. He owned one of the few automobiles registered in Miami in 1911, a Cadillac.

Notably, a petition and lawsuit were filed with the local court to keep the serving city commissioners including C.D. Leffler, J.E. Lummus, Romfh and J.I. Wilson, from being on the ballot in 1923. All the men were local bankers. They advertised and campaigned together. The courts eventually sided with the incumbents, allowing them to continue their hold on Miami government into the late 1930's. He is buried at Miami's Woodlawn Park North Cemetery.

== See also ==
- List of mayors of Miami
- Government of Miami
- History of Miami
- Timeline of Miami

Political offices
Preceded by PA Henderson	Mayor of the City of Miami; 1925-1927	Succeeded by EG Sewell
