= Robert King High =

American politician (1924–1967)

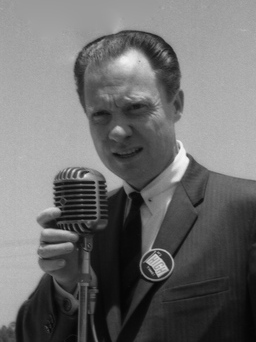
- High in 1964

29th Mayor of Miami
- In office January 1, 1957 – August 30, 1967
- Preceded by: Randy Christmas
- Succeeded by: Stephen P. Clark; W. E. Master Johnson (acting)

Personal details
- Born: April 9, 1924 Flat Creek, Tennessee, U.S.
- Died: August 30, 1967 (aged 43) Miami, Florida, U.S.
- Resting place: Miami Memorial Park Cemetery; Miami, Florida, U.S.
- Party: Democratic
- Spouse: Sarah Faith Price (m. 1954)
- Children: 6
- Education: University of Miami (AB); Stetson University (JD)
- Occupation: Attorney

Military service
- Allegiance: United States
- Branch/service: United States Army
- Years of service: 1942–1944
- Battles/wars: World War II

Robert King High (April 9, 1924 – August 30, 1967) was an attorney and politician, a reform mayor of Miami, Florida, serving for over a decade from January 1957 until his death in August 1967. From eastern Tennessee, High moved to Florida after his service in World War II. He became active in the Democratic Party.

In 1966, High was the Democratic nominee for governor of Florida, but he was defeated by Republican Claude Kirk in an upset election at a time when the Democratic Party generally still dominated state politics.

== Early life and education ==
High was born in 1924 in Flat Creek, Tennessee, where his father was a carpenter and farmer. With the coming of the Great Depression, the High family moved to the city of Chattanooga. High began working early, delivering newspapers at the age of five, and buying a lawn mower on credit at age ten; he paid for it by mowing lawns and delivering groceries and milk. He later worked as a soda jerk. He organized a band; the members played in their ROTC uniforms until they could afford to buy tuxedos.

After graduation from high school, High attended vocational school where he trained to be a welder. He moved to New Orleans, Louisiana to work in a shipyard. With the United States entry into World War II, he lost his job at the shipyard as projects were diverted to the war effort. He went to work in a women's shoe store, and soon was promoted to assistant manager of the chain's store in Baton Rouge, Louisiana.

At the end of 1942, High left Baton Rouge to enter the University of Chattanooga. He left school soon after, however, to enlist in the Army Air Corps. High seriously injured his back during basic training, and doctors inserted a steel plate to reinforce his back. He spent nearly a year in a military hospital after the operation.

After being discharged from the Army in 1944, he moved to Miami, where he attended college with the help of the GI Bill, graduating from the University of Miami and Stetson University College of Law. With his Juris Doctor degree, High began practicing law in Miami. He soon was doing well enough to purchase a Cadillac, a speed boat, and a house.

== Career ==
In 1957, Abe Aronovitz, who had been mayor of Miami in 1953–55, invited High to run for mayor. With Aronovitz's backing, High ran on a platform of promising nothing but honest government. He did not accept any campaign contributions of more than US$250.00. With his campaign unable to afford the billboards and television advertising that other candidates were using, High supporters stood outside the Orange Bowl with home-made campaign banners on every Friday night that the University of Miami football team played a home game.

High placed second out of five candidates in the primary, and beat the incumbent mayor, Randy Christmas, in the runoff.

=== Mayor of Miami ===
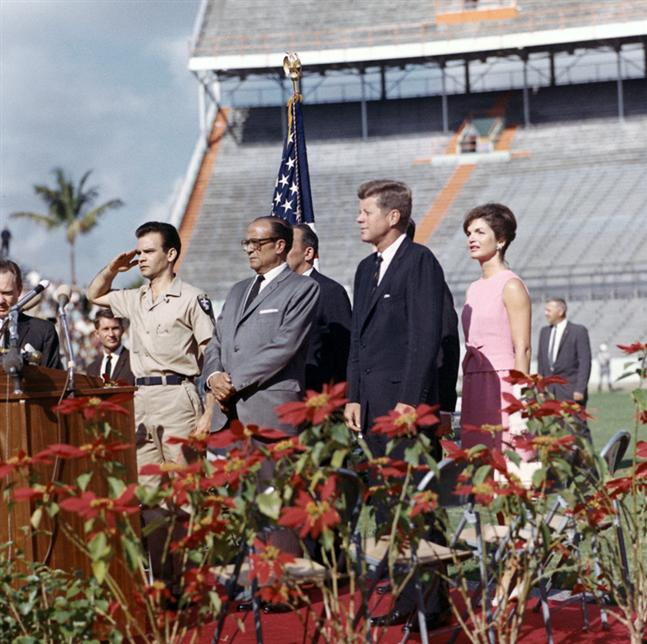
King standing to the far left of President John F. Kennedy as Kennedy addresses Brigade 2506 at the Miami Orange Bowl on December 29, 1962

Once in office, High began tackling corruption. With most of the city commissioners opposing him, he could do little as mayor, but he began pushing to publicize problems. He visited strip clubs in the company of a reporter, leading to a series of reports of how the bars were cheating customers. He dressed in old clothes and, again accompanied by a reporter, bought bolita (an illegal lottery) tickets on the street.

High won reelection in 1959, and was joined by a slate of newly elected, reform-minded city commissioners. High's reform efforts drew national attention, and he was named one of a hundred outstanding young Americans by Life magazine. With a new majority on the city commission, High worked with them to reform the way the city bought insurance. Previous practice had been for each commissioner to give a share of the city's insurance to whomever they chose as a form of patronage. In order to ensure that each commissioner could disburse an equal share of the insurance business, buildings were divided into "parts" insured by different companies.

High and the new commissioners put all the city's insurance out to competitive bid. High also led a statewide campaign to force Florida Power & Light to lower its rates. After the city of Miami started a study of Southern Bell telephone rates, the Florida Public Service Commission ordered major reductions in those rates. High also led a fight to force the Florida East Coast Railway to pay the arrears in its assessed property taxes. While High was mayor, Miami adopted a $10,000 spending limit for city elections.

High spoke Spanish well, and made a number of goodwill trips to Latin America. He exchanged visits with several heads of state of Latin American countries. Working with City Manager Melvin Reese, High established the Torch of Friendship in downtown Miami as a symbol of relations between Miami and Latin America. In 1959 High was sent to Cuba as part of a delegation trying to re-establish tourism between the United States and Cuba. The delegation was snubbed by Fidel Castro, who failed to keep several appointments with them. The delegation eventually gave up and returned to the United States. As the Cuban Revolution proceeded, and the U.S. blockade and embargo against Cuba tightened, Cuban refugees flooded into the United States, particularly Florida. High worked to accommodate 200,000 Cuban refugees in Miami, where they became in integral part of the city.

High was a strong supporter of civil rights. As mayor he set up a panel in 1967 to hear job grievances from African Americans. High was involved in the successful effort to integrate lunch counters in Miami. He publicly backed the public accommodations section of Civil Rights Bill of 1964 while campaigning for governor. Although he had received death threats to prevent his speaking in Pensacola, High told a crowd there that "Segregation is wrong. It is evil and un-American."

In 1963, High had a heart attack; he was 39 years old. He soon recovered and returned to his duties as mayor.

In 1964, High was initiated as an honorary brother in the Alpha Phi chapter of Alpha Kappa Psi at the University of Florida.

=== 1964 and 1966 Florida gubernatorial candidacies ===
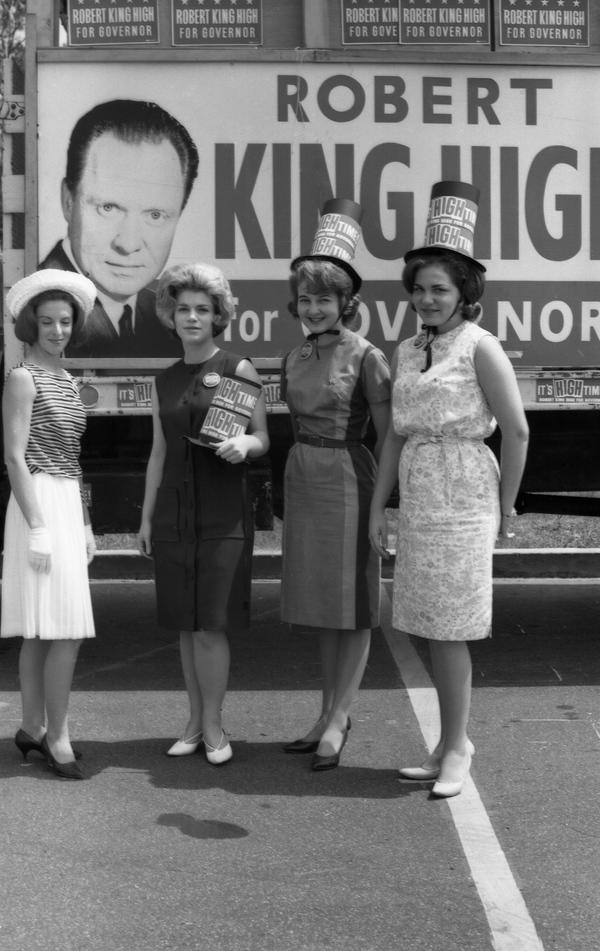
Supporters in Tallahassee in 1964

Since the last part of the nineteenth century, Florida governors had not been able to serve two consecutive terms. They were elected in the same year as presidential elections were held.

In the early 1960s, to stop strong Republican presidential candidates from influencing the vote for governor, the Democratic-dominated legislature of Florida moved the election years for governors to fall between presidential elections. For the transition, the governor elected in 1964 would serve only two years, but would be eligible to run again in 1966 for a full four-year term.

High first entered the race for governor in 1964. He announced that he would refuse to accept large campaign donations, and traveled the state in a DC-3. The Miami News was the only newspaper in the state to endorse High. Until his candidacy, Democratic candidates for governor of Florida had supported segregation, some more strongly than others. The Democratic-dominated legislature at the turn of the century had passed a new constitution that disenfranchised most blacks, a status that was enforced until after passage of the Voting Rights Act of 1965. High broke with this tradition, publicly supporting the public accommodations section of the Civil Rights Act of 1964 and promising to promote racial equality. He said that equal treatment of all Americans was the "most sensible issue of our times". High came in second out of five contenders in the Democratic primary, but lost the run-off to Jacksonville mayor Haydon Burns, who was elected as governor. (Florida had not elected a Republican governor since the end of Reconstruction, due to disenfranchisement of the black (and Republican) vote.) Despite the overall result, his campaign was regarded to have been bolstered and put in a more competitive position by his support of the Civil Rights Act, and his open seeking of support from black voters in the state's cities.

In June 1965, High helped convince the American Football League to place an expansion franchise in Miami, which was named the Miami Dolphins. Also in 1965, Governor Burns proposed a large highway construction bond issue for Florida. High campaigned vigorously against the road bond measure, and it was defeated. The same year High was re-elected to his fifth term as mayor of Miami.

==== 1966 election ====
High ran for governor again in 1966 under the slogan "Integrity is the issue". Governor Burns charged that Robert F. Kennedy was behind High's campaign, pointing to three High campaign aides who had previously worked for Sargent Shriver, a Kennedy ally. Kennedy denied taking sides. High had been close to the late President John F. Kennedy; he was the first elected official in Florida to support Kennedy's 1960 presidential campaign. Burns claimed to have the support of President Lyndon B. Johnson and Vice President Hubert Humphrey, but the White House denied taking sides. Many conservative Democrats in Florida were alienated by High's racial views and ties to the Kennedys. High was from Miami, and people in the rest of Florida believed that urban Miami and Dade County represented high taxes and liberalism; the region was considered suspect.

During the 1966 primary campaign, a seat became vacant on the Miami city commission. High appointed M. Athalie Range, a black woman, to the seat. Range had led in the primary for a seat on the commission in the 1965 election, but lost to a white man in the run-off by a small margin after her race was made an issue in the election. Range was the first black person to serve on the Miami City Commission. She twice won reelection on her own. Later she was the first black person appointed to head a Florida state agency.

High opponents tried to arouse segregationist white sentiments against him as the 'black' candidate. 'Throwaways', handouts with no attributed source, were circulated. One showed a pregnant black woman in a rocker, with the caption, "I went all the way with Robert King High". Another had pictures of Rev. Martin Luther King Jr., Robert Kennedy, and Robert King High, and was labeled, "A poker hand one joker and a pair of Kings." A photograph of High playing pickup football with some black newsboys was widely circulated.

High came in second in the primary, behind Burns. Scott Kelly, a conservative politician from rural northern Florida, who came in third in the primary, agreed to endorse High for the runoff, but did not plan to actively campaign. Governor Burns, however, charged that Kelly had offered to sell his support to Burns for $500,000, and that High had bought Kelly's support. The Miami News noted that High had raised only $140,000, while Burns had raised one million dollars for the campaign. Burns had spent $2.19 for each vote he had received, while Kelly had spent $1.40, and High had spent 38 cents per vote. Calling the Burns charge "The Big Lie", Kelly actively campaigned for High in the runoff.

High won the run-off by a sizable margin, getting 43% of the vote in Burns' hometown of Jacksonville, Florida. Kelly continued to work for High in the general election campaign. The High and Kelly campaign staff and, after the run-off, that part of the Burns campaign staff who joined the campaign, did not mix very well. Burns refused to support High, and several of his Florida Cabinet officers (who were elected) actively campaigned for Claude Kirk, the Republican candidate for governor.

Although not endorsing Kirk, Burns placed much of his campaign organization at Kirk's disposal. In September Don Petit, a moderate liberal and High's campaign manager, quit over differences with Scott Kelly. The conservative Kelly took over as campaign manager. Kelly was later replaced by Bill Poorbaugh, another moderate liberal. The campaign had scheduling problems, causing High to be late for or to miss a number of campaign events. The campaign was seen as faltering and in disarray. Both liberal and conservative Democrats became disaffected with High.

Claude Kirk, the Republican candidate for governor, attacked High repeatedly. Kirk charged that under High, Miami had become the number two crime or 'sin city' in the country. Kirk called High an "extreme-liberal", an ultra-liberal and "a rubber stamp for Washington, backed by the ultra-liberals", linking High to the Johnson administration. Kirk started asking campaign crowds if they wanted "open housing". A new handout from a "Committee for Integrity in Government" showed a cartoon of High with the caption, "Black power is with you 100 percent, Bob, let's march." Kirk portrayed himself as pro-business, and accused High of not understanding the free-enterprise system.

Just before the election, Kirk charged that the Dade County Grand Jury was withholding indictments and information detrimental to High, which would have a direct bearing on the election. But the grand jury foreman said there were no un-issued indictments. Kirk won the general election by about 160,000 votes, the first Republican to be elected governor of Florida since the end of the Reconstruction Era.

== Death ==
King High died of a heart attack less than a year later, on August 30, 1967, at age 43.

== Legacy ==
Robert King High has been memorialized in Miami by the Robert King High Park and the Robert King High Tower Public Housing Facility.

== See also ==
- List of mayors of Miami
- Government of Miami

== Notes ==
Party political offices
| Preceded by W. Haydon Burns | Democratic nominee for Governor of Florida; 1966 | Succeeded by Reubin Askew |
Political offices
| Preceded by Randy Christmas | Mayor of the City of Miami; 1957–1967 | Succeeded by Stephen P. Clark |
