= Jack Orr =

American politician

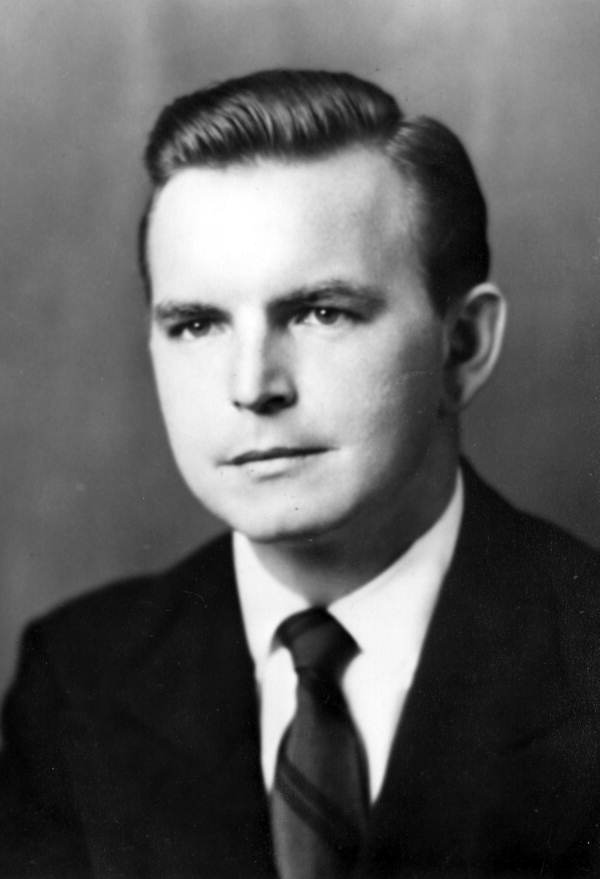
- Orr in 1955

3rd Mayor of Metropolitan Dade County
- In office 1972–1974
- Preceded by: Stephen P. Clark
- Succeeded by: Stephen P. Clark

Member of the Florida House of Representatives
- In office 1954–1958

Personal details
- Born: John B. Orr Jr. Oct 9, 1919
- Died: July 25, 1974 (aged 54) Miami, Florida, U.S.
- Party: Democratic
- Spouse: Virginia Sharpe
- Education: University of Florida (LLB)

John B. Orr Jr. (c. 1920 – July 25, 1974) was an American attorney and politician who served as a member of the Florida House of Representatives and as the Mayor of Metropolitan Dade County from 1972 to 1974.

== Background ==
Orr earned a Bachelor of Laws from the Fredric G. Levin College of Law at the University of Florida. In 1954, he was elected to the Florida House of Representatives. During his tenure in the House, Orr was the only member who voted against school segregation in 1956. He was defeated for re-election in 1958.

Orr was a mentor to Janet Reno during her early career in Miami-Dade County politics.

In 1972, Orr was elected the third mayor of Miami-Dade County, Florida. Orr died of cancer in 1974 and was succeeded by Stephen P. Clark. Orr is the namesake of the Jack Orr Plaza in front of the Main Library and the Jack Orr Plaza Apartments, a public housing complex.

Orr's paternal uncle, Alexander Orr Jr was the 20th Mayor of the City of Miami.

== See also ==
- List of Mayors of Miami Dade County
