= R. B. Gautier =

American judge and politician

R. B. Gautier Sr

15th Mayor of Miami
- In office 1931–1933
- Preceded by: C. H. Reeder
- Succeeded by: E.G. Sewell

Personal details
- Born: July 20, 1877 Putnam County, Florida, US
- Died: 1944 Miami, Florida, US
- Resting place: Miami City Cemetery
- Party: Democrat
- Spouse: Ida Miller
- Children: R.B. Gautier Jr., Ida Miller Gautier, Elizabeth Osgood Gautier
- Profession: Attorney

Redmond Bunn Gautier Sr. (1877-1944) was an attorney, judge and the City of Miami's 15th Mayor.

Gautier was born in Putnam County, Florida. When he was a boy his family moved to Miami. His grandfather, Thomas Nicholas (T.N.) Gautier Sr, was signer on the city's filing for incorporation. The Gautiers are considered Miami pioneers.

Around the time of WWI, the Gautier family lived in Miami Beach. Gautier was a city attorney for Miami from 1905-1911.

R.B. Gautier later became a county judge from 1911-1915, and later successfully ran for Mayor of Miami. He was seated next to Franklin D. Roosevelt at Bayfront Park in Miami in February 1933 when Giuseppe Zangara attempted to assassinate Roosevelt. Gautier and Roosevelt survived unscathed but Chicago Mayor Anton Cermak was mortally wounded and five other bystanders sustained injuries.

Gautier would run for governor in 1936 but lost in the Democratic primaries. During the Democratic primaries, he would receive 1,607 votes (0.67% of the vote).

Gautier died in Miami in 1944. His son R.B. Gautier Jr. was elected to the Florida House of Representatives.

== Civic affiliations ==
Gautier was a member of the Elks.

== See also ==
- List of mayors of Miami
- Government of Miami
- History of Miami
