= E. G. Sewell Park =

Park in the United States of America

Sewell Park
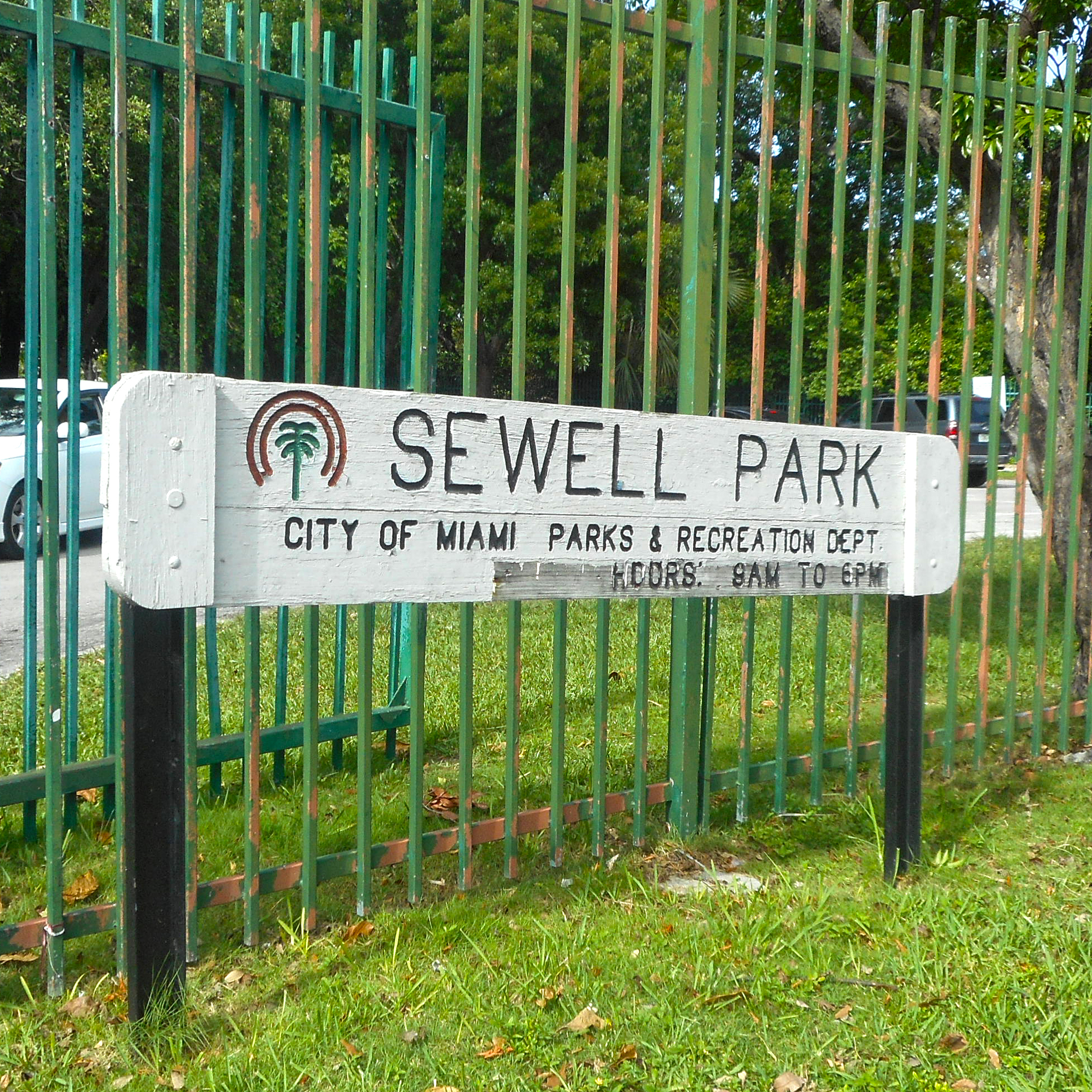
- Sewell Park Sign
- Interactive map of Sewell Park
- Type: Municipal
- Location: 1801 NW S River Drive; Miami, FL 33125
- Coordinates: 25°47′06″N 80°13′27″W
- Area: 10.33 acres (0.0418 km^{2})
- Operator: Miami-Dade Parks and Recreation Department
- Open: 9 a.m.–5 p.m.
- Website: miamigov.com/parks

E. G. Sewell Park is a 10.33-acre (4.18 ha) riverfront park located close to the 17th Ave Bridge over the Miami River, in Miami, Florida, United States. The site marks the tropical garden area of property purchased in 1897 by General Samuel Crocker Lawrence.

Lawrence created a lushly landscaped garden of royal palms with a guest house and a boat slip, and grew grapefruit on much of the remainder of his land. The royal palms remain, as do the boat slip, the steps, columns, and foundation of the guest house, and a water pump Lawrence used to irrigate the tropical plants and the grapefruit groves nearby.

The park is named for former Miami mayor E. G. Sewell.

== Gallery ==
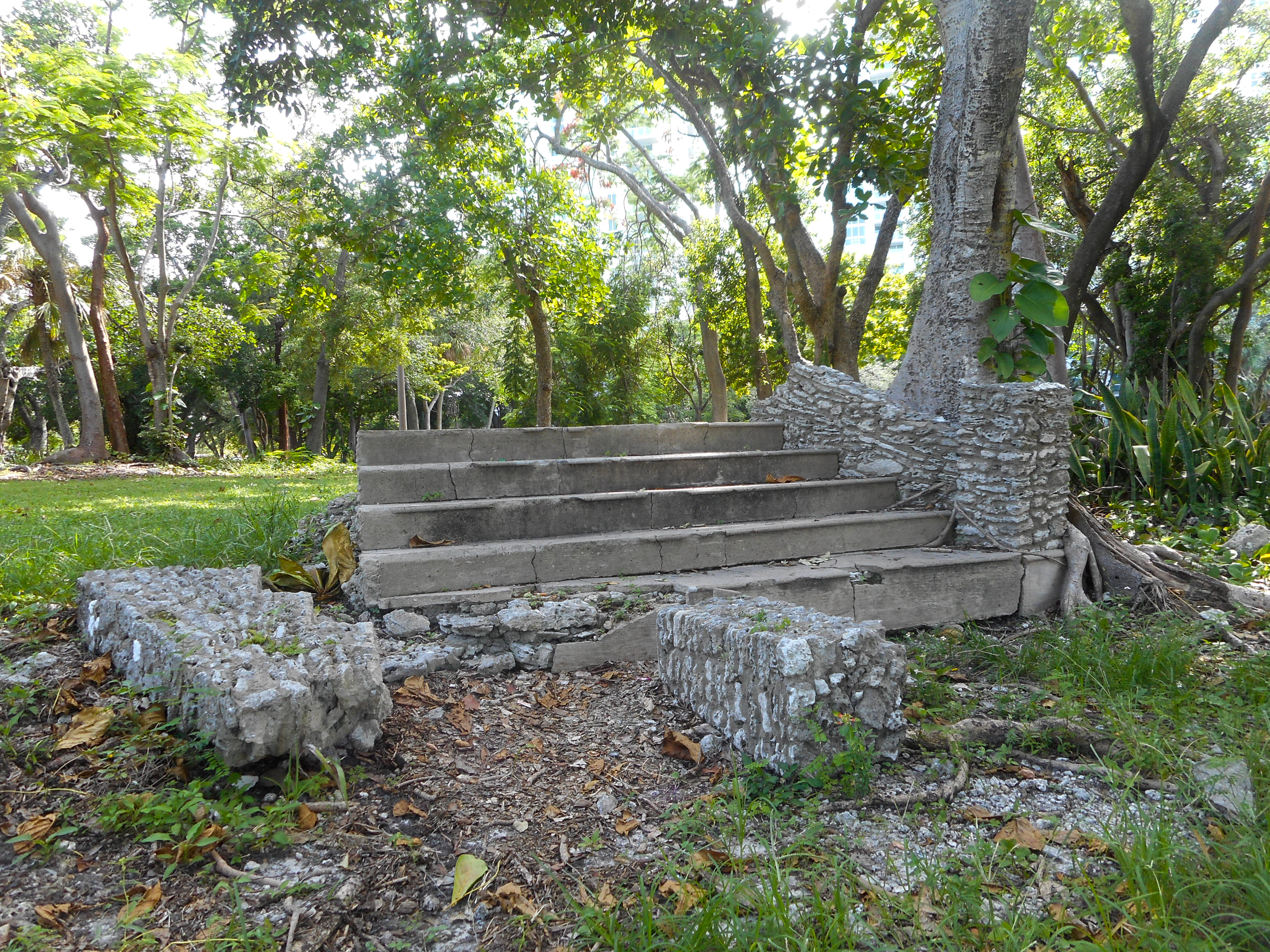
Concrete and stone stair ruins

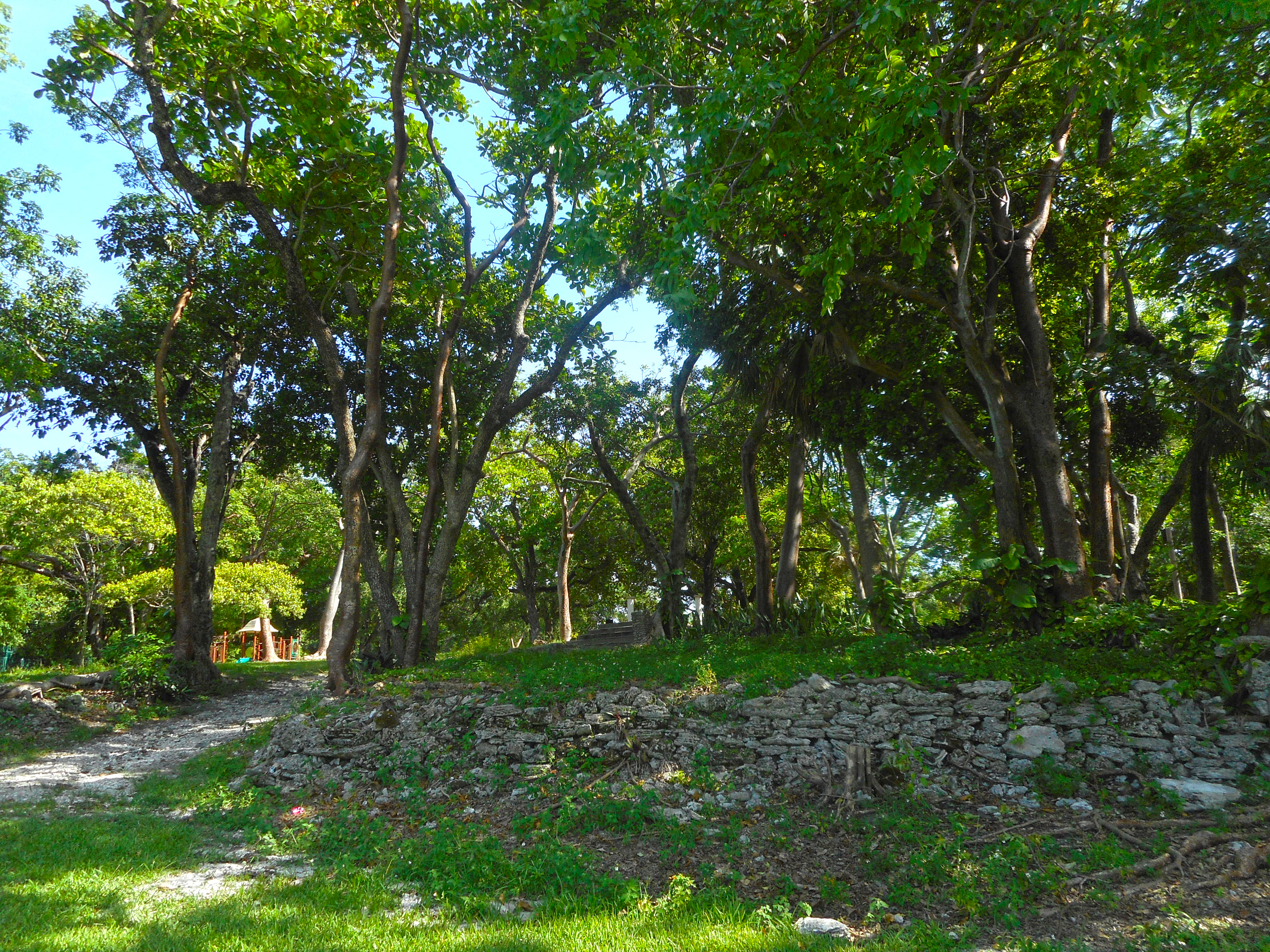
General view

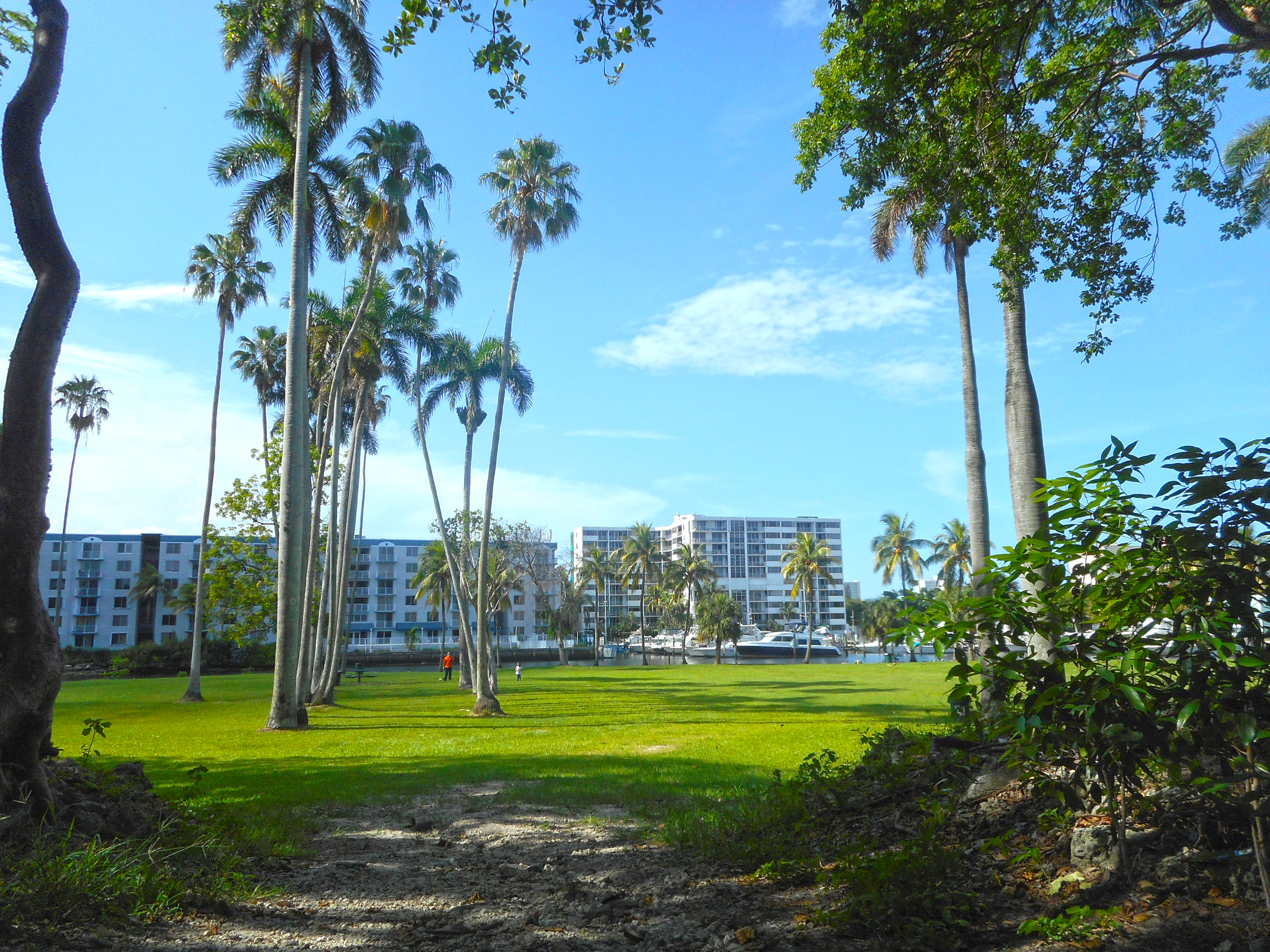
Miami River and grassy knoll

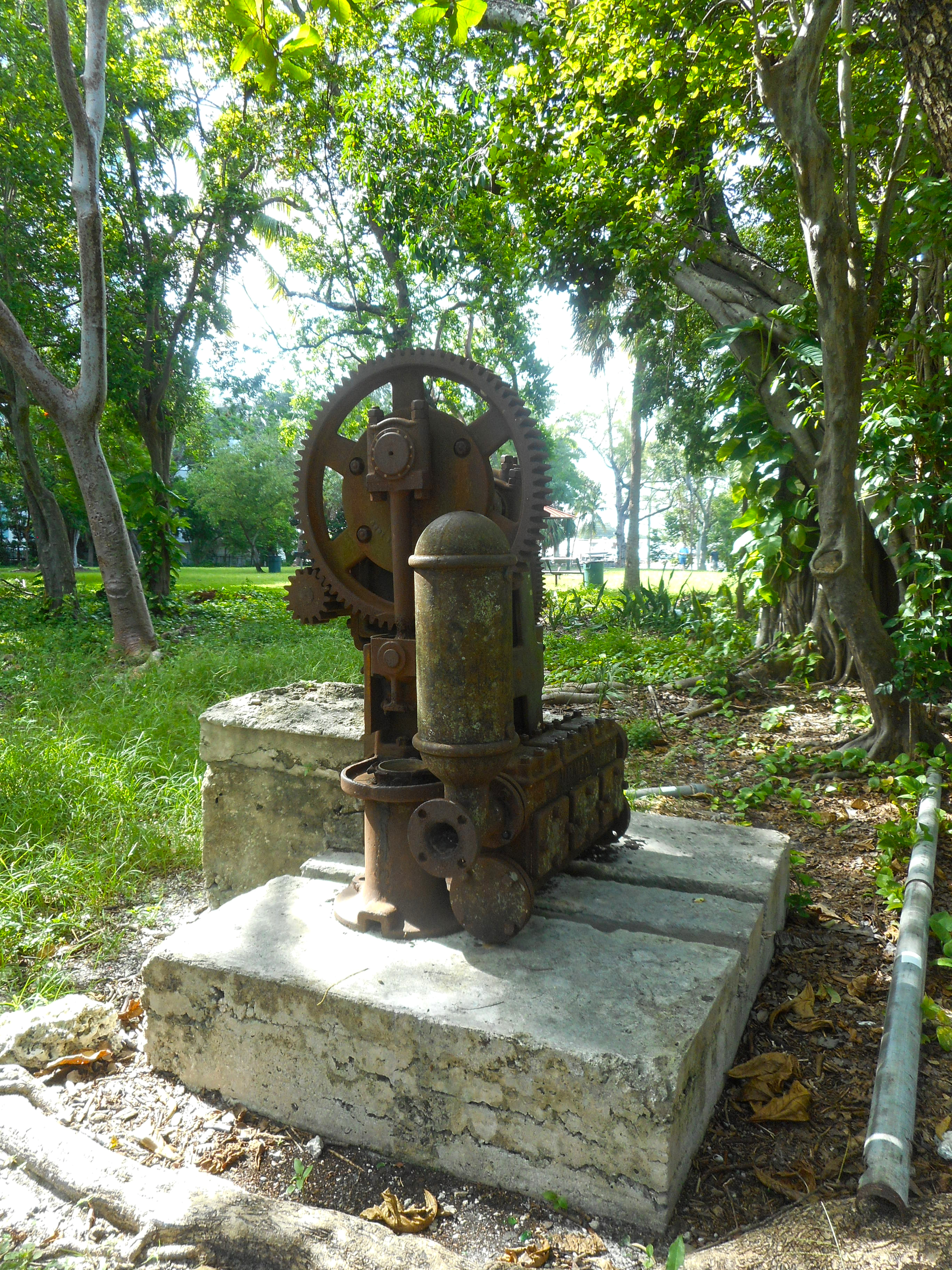
Old machinery

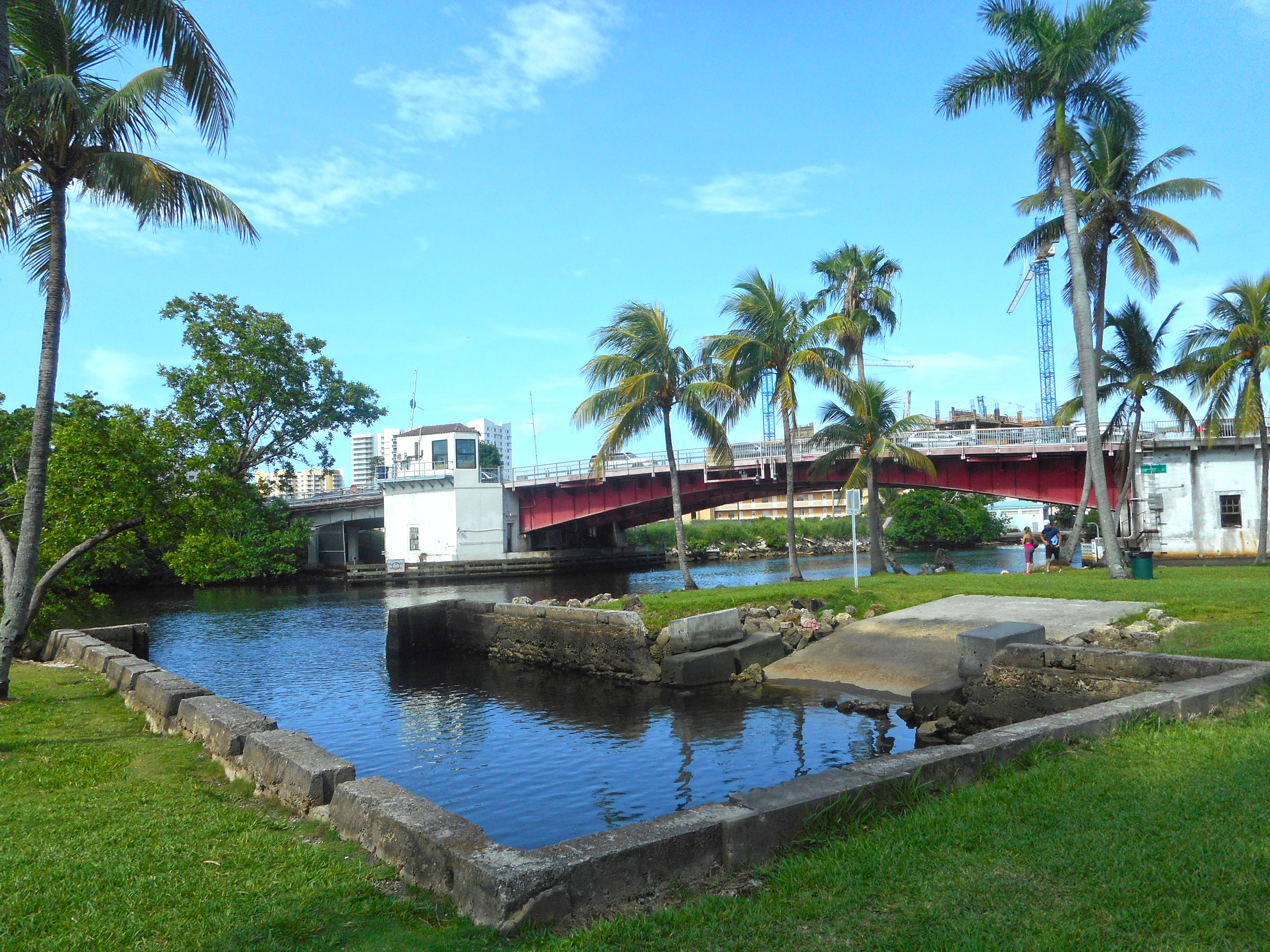
Boat Ramp and 17th Street bridge

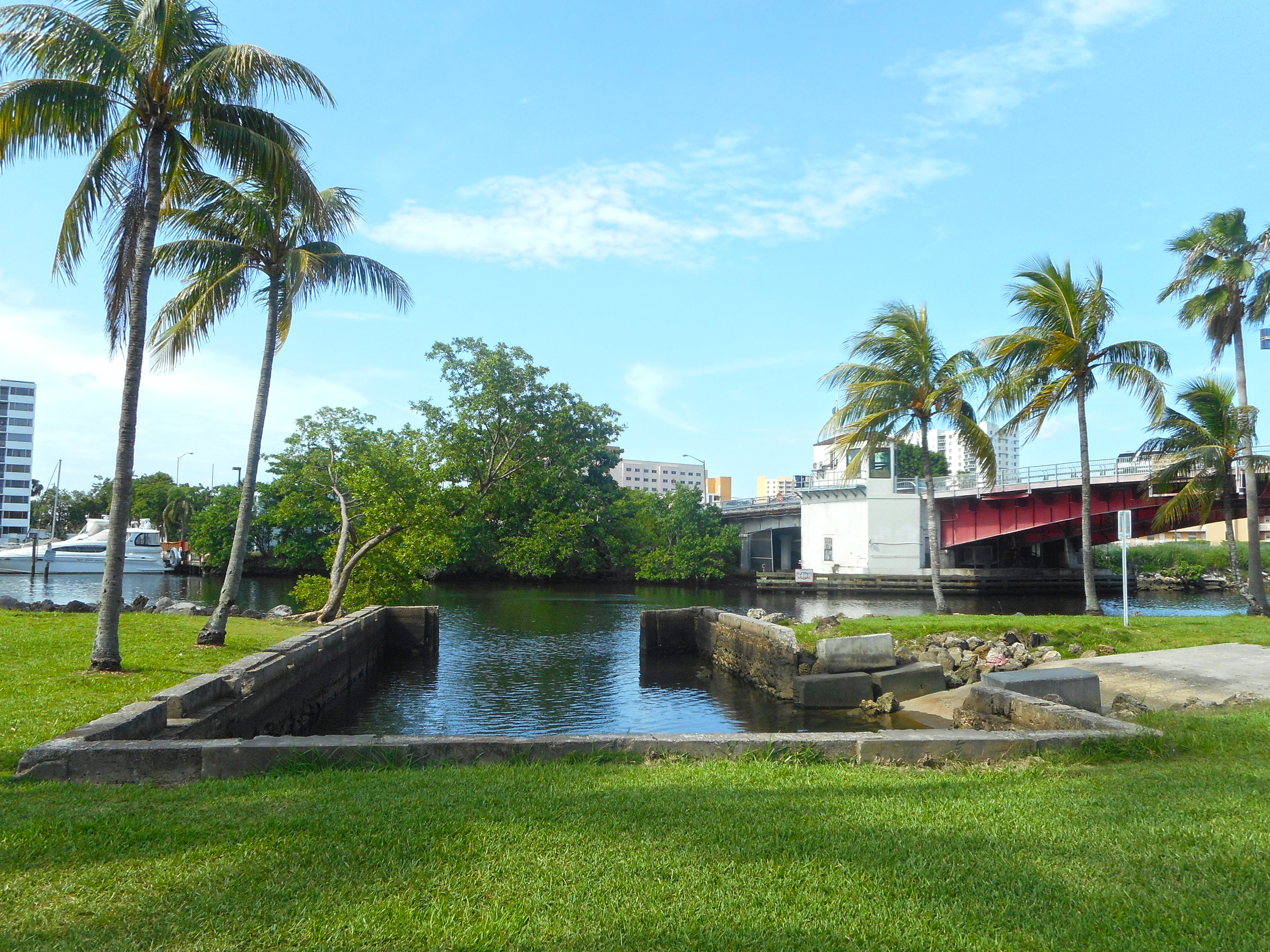

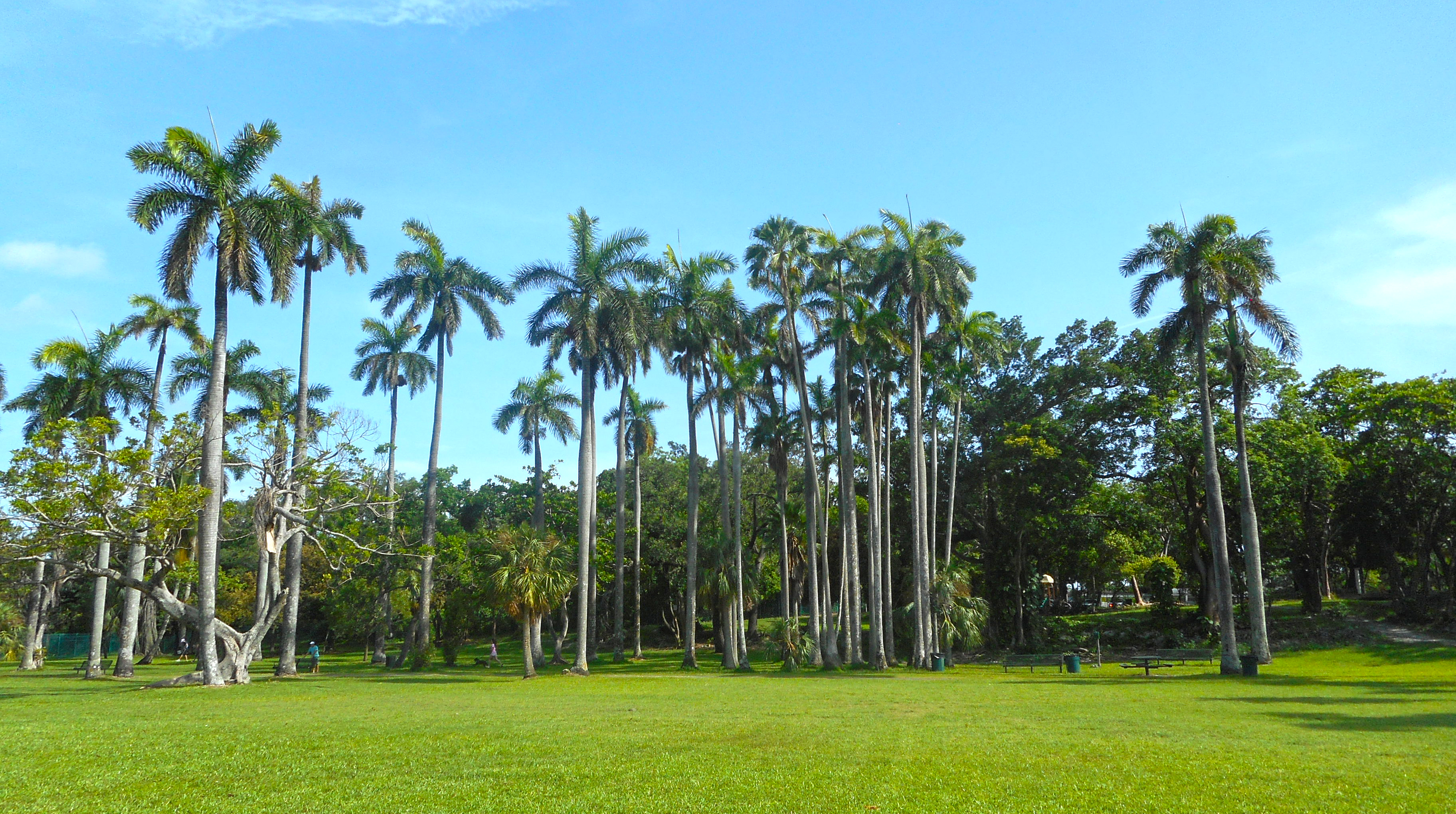
Royal palm grove
