= List of mayors of Miami-Dade County, Florida =

Mayor of Miami-Dade County
- Seal of Miami Dade County

- Flag of Miami-Dade County, Florida

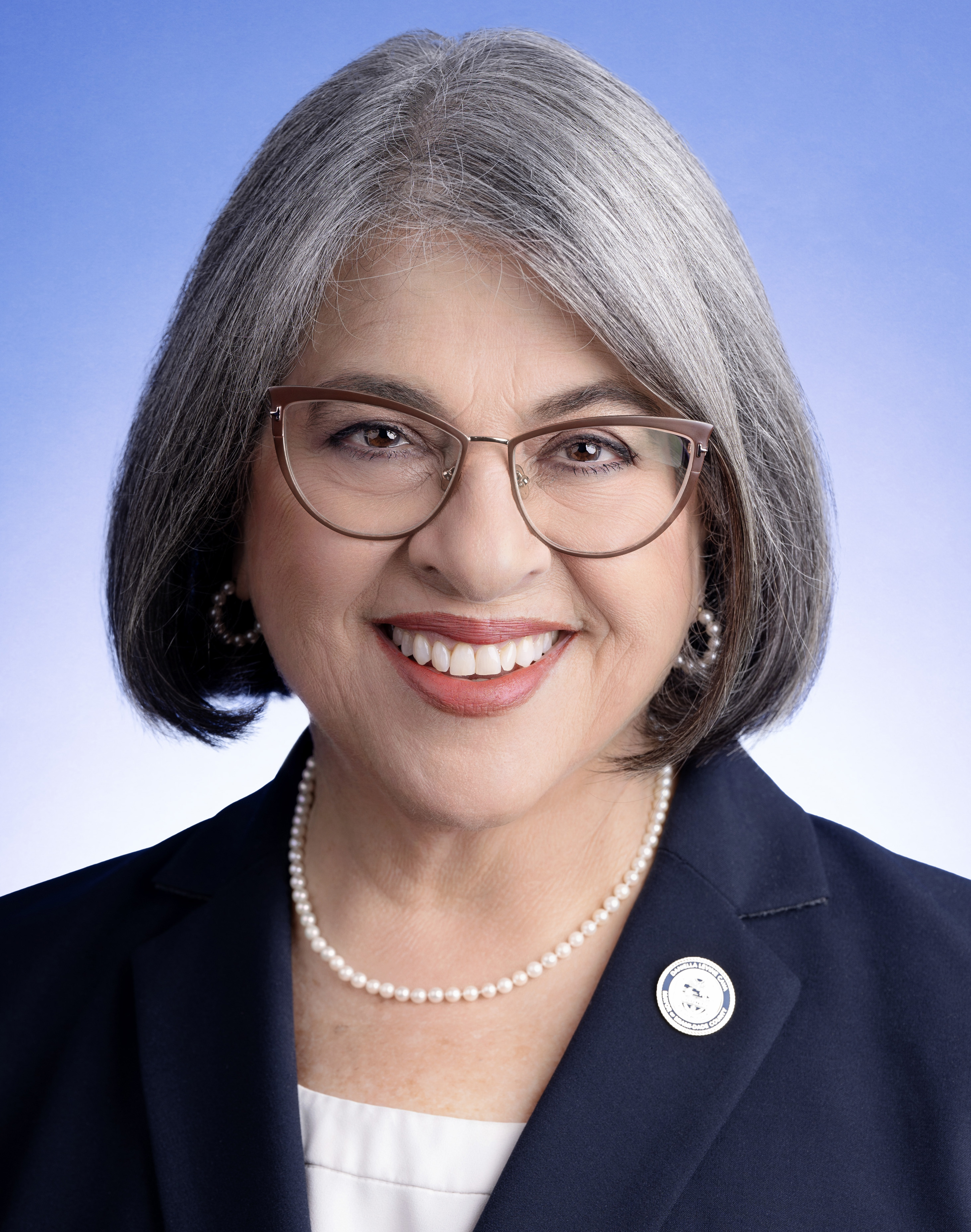
- Incumbent; Daniella Levine Cava since November 17, 2020
- Type: Mayor
- Formation: 1964
- First holder: Chuck Hall

The following is a list of mayors of Miami-Dade County, Florida.

== Mayors ==
No.	Image	Mayor	Term start	Term end	Party	Ref.
1		Chuck Hall	1964	1970	Democratic	
2		Stephen P. Clark	November 25, 1970	October 17, 1972	Democratic	
3		Jack Orr	1972	1974	Democratic	
4		Stephen P. Clark (2nd term)	1974	1993	Democratic	
Position abolished by a 1992 federal court ruling invalidating Dade County's electoral system and ordering a restructuring of county government. Position recreated in 1996. Voters renamed the county Miami-Dade County the following year.
5		Alex Penelas	October 1, 1996	November 6, 2004	Democratic	
6		Carlos Alvarez	November 6, 2004	March 18, 2011	Republican	
7		Carlos A. Giménez	July 1, 2011	November 17, 2020	Republican	
8		Daniella Levine Cava	November 17, 2020	Incumbent	Democratic	

== See also ==
- List of mayors of Miami (city)
- Government of Miami-Dade County
