= Benjamin Charles Willard =

American politician

Ben C Willard

Florida House of Representatives
- In office 1921–1925
- Preceded by: John W. Watson
- Succeeded by: Norris McElya

Personal details
- Born: August 6, 1890
- Died: July 9, 1963 (aged 72)
- Spouse: Billie T Willard
- Children: 2
- Profession: Attorney

Military service
- Branch/service: United States Army
- Years of service: 1918–1919
- Unit: 81st Div AEF
- Battles/wars: WWI

Benjamin Charles Willard (August 6, 1890 – July 9, 1963) was an elected representative in the Florida house and judge in Miami, Florida.

== Biography ==
Willard was the child of CA Willard, and Octavia Willard, previously of Cocoa, Florida, and early settlers of Miami. The Willards arrived in Miami before World War I. Although they were not around during the incorporation of the city, Ben Willard and his sisters were first-generation Miamians who grew up in the city, and helped make the city boom.

Willard attended Miami public schools then Stetson undergrad and Stetson Law School.

He was drafted and served a year in the Army during World War I.

== Politics ==
Willard was a Democrat. He won election as state representative following veteran lawmaker JW Watson, who went on to become a state senator. He was succeeded to represent Miami in the Florida House by Norris McElya.

He was the youngest elected state representative from Dade County when elected.

Although he won only two popular elections, 1921 and 1923, Willard ran at least two more times unsuccessfully. He finally earned appointment as Dade County criminal judge in 1935, when Governor Dave Scholtz appointed him to replace Judge EC Collins, who was suspended after being indicted for embezzlement.

== Fraternal and civic affiliations ==
Fraternally he served with the Elks and the American Legion.

== Law & later life ==
Willard practiced law at his own firm, Willard and Knight when not active in politics. He became Miami's primary law enforcement official for almost 3 decades. Stetson Law School named an award after him. The Criminal Defense Attorney's Association erected a monument to him at the justice building.

He died while still on the judicial bench in 1961.
