= William Pruden Smith =

American politician

William P Smith

9th Mayor of Miami
- In office November 1919 – July 1921
- Preceded by: J.W. Watson
- Succeeded by: C.D. Leffler

Personal details
- Born: March 4, 1876 Dalton, Georgia, US
- Died: January 20, 1923 (aged 46) Atlanta, Georgia, US
- Spouse: May Garner Smith
- Children: William Pruden Smith Jr, Katherine Smith
- Profession: Attorney

Military service
- Branch/service: United States Army
- Years of service: 1918-1919
- Rank: Captain

William Pruden Smith (March 4, 1876 – January 20, 1923) was a prominent attorney and the City of Miami's ninth mayor.

== Biography ==
Smith was born in Georgia but grew up in Tennessee. His paternal grandfather was a lawyer and US Congressman from Tennessee, Samuel Axley Smith.

He studied law at the University of Tennessee and spent his early career in Jacksonville, Florida where he practiced law.

He and his wife had a house in Miami as early as 1908. Mr. Smith moved to Miami in 1911 where he become the third member of the successful partnership, Shutts, Smith, and Bowen. Notably, he was admitted to the U.S.Supreme Court Bar in 1916.

As America joined WWI, officers were recruited from college-educated civilians. In 1917 Smith went to officer training in Georgia.

Major Smith was commander of the Dade County Guard battalion, the local volunteer militia. The County Guards were authorized by the Florida legislature in 1917 to replace the Florida National Guard, which had been called up for service in the regular United States military during World War I.

Near the end of the war he was a captain in the US Army, assigned to General Staff.

He had to leave his law practice in 1919 when he was elected Mayor of Miami. Later, Smith joined another law firm with former State Representative, Simon Pierre Robineau.

He died in Atlanta and is buried in Tennessee with his parents.

== Philanthropic and civic activities ==
Smith was active in the Elks Club. He is cited as having made the call to organize a veteran's group in Miami after World War I. The group became the first American Legion post of Florida, Miami's Harvey W Seeds American Legion Post #29.

== See also ==
- List of mayors of Miami
- Government of Miami
- History of Miami
- Timeline of Miami
- UT alumni

Political offices
Preceded by J.W. Watson	Mayor of the City of Miami; 1919-1921	Succeeded by C.D. Leffler
