= C. H. Reeder =

American politician (1880–1961)

Clifford H Reeder
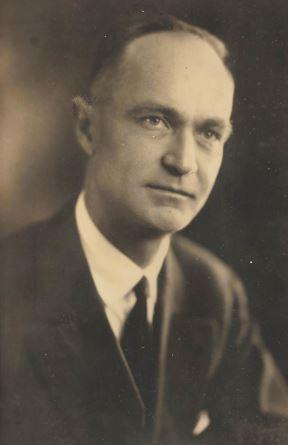
- C.H. Reeder

14th and 21st Mayor of Miami
- In office 1929–1931
- Preceded by: E.G. Sewell
- Succeeded by: R.B. Gautier
- In office 1941–1943
- Preceded by: Alexander Orr, Jr
- Succeeded by: Leonard K. Thomson

Personal details
- Born: Clifford Howard Reeder; August 12, 1880 Knoxville, Tennessee, U.S.
- Died: December 1, 1961 (aged 81) Miami, Florida, U.S.
- Party: Republican
- Spouse: Nellie Scarboro
- Children: 1
- Profession: Accountant

Military service
- Allegiance: United States
- Branch/service: United States Army
- Years of service: 1918-1919 (USA)
- Rank: Lieutenant

Clifford Howard Reeder (August 12, 1880 – December 1, 1961) was an American politician who served as the 14th and 21st mayor of Miami.

== Biography ==
Reeder entered into World War I on August 12, 1918. He served 10 months overseas as an Army officer and engineer and was discharged in July 1919.

Elected as a Republican, Reeder served from 1929 to 1931 and then notably again during World War II.

During his tenure as mayor, Reeder and his wife helped launch the U.S.S. Miami .

In 1942 Reeder testified before Congress in relation to inland waterways and how to improve the movement of war materials to coastal cities like Miami.

== Philanthropic and civic activities ==
Reeder was the Commander of Miami's Harvey W Seeds American Legion Post #29 in 1924.

== See also ==
- List of mayors of Miami
- List of members of the American Legion
- History of Miami
