= List of mayors of Miami =

Mayor of Miami
- Seal of the City of Miami

- Flag of the City of Miami

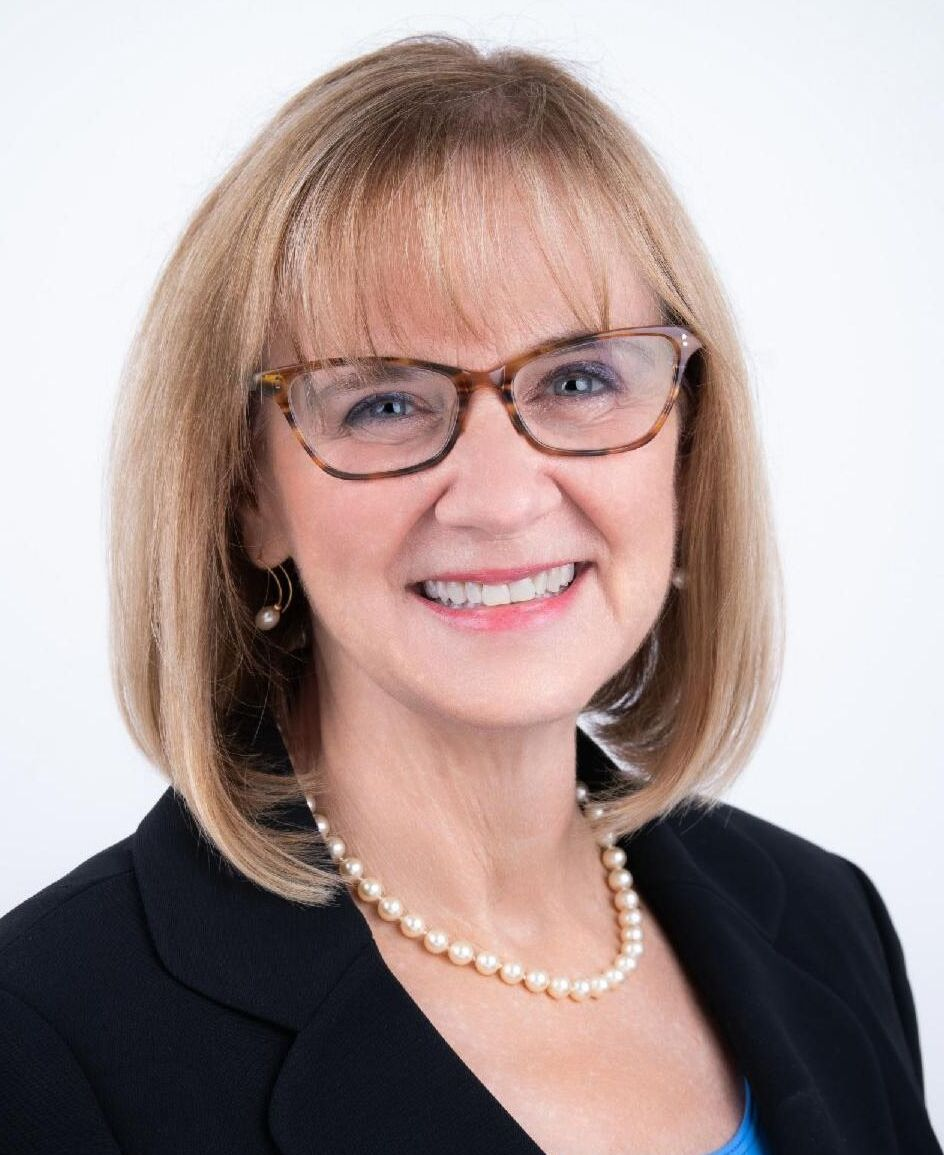
- Incumbent; Eileen Higgins since December 18, 2025
- Style: The Honorable
- Term length: 4 years, renewable once
- Inaugural holder: John B. Reilly
- Formation: 1896
- Salary: $187,500
- Website: www.miami.gov/My-Government/City-Officials/Mayor-Eileen-Higgins

Below is a list of mayors of the City of Miami, Florida, United States.

== List of mayors ==
No.	Image	Mayor	Term start	Term end	Party	Ref.
1		John B. Reilly	1896	1900	Republican	
2		J. E. Lummus	1900	1903	Republican	
3		John Sewell	1903	1907	Republican	
4		F. H. Wharton	1907	1911	Democratic	
5		S. Rodmond Smith	1911	1912	Republican	
6		J. W. Watson Sr.	1912	1915	Democratic	
7		Parker A. Henderson	1915	1917	Republican	
8		J. W. Watson Sr.	1917	1919	Democratic	
9		William Pruden Smith	1919	1921	Republican	
10		C. D. Leffler	1921	1923	Democratic	
11		Parker A. Henderson	1923	1925	Republican	
12		Edward C Romfh	1925	1927	Republican	
13		E. G. Sewell	1927	1929	Republican	
14		C. H. Reeder	1929	1931	Republican	
15		R. B. Gautier	1931	1933	Democratic	
16		E. G. Sewell	1933	1935	Republican	
17		A.D.H. Fossey	1935	1937	Republican	
18		Robert R. Williams	1937	1939	Republican	
19		E. G. Sewell	1939	1940	Republican	
20		Alexander Orr Jr.	1940	1941	Republican	
21		C. H. Reeder	1941	1943	Republican	
22		Leonard K. Thomson	1943	1945	Republican	
23		Perrine Palmer Jr.	1945	1947	Democratic	
24		Robert L. Floyd	1947	1949	Democratic	
25		William M. Wolfarth	1949	1951	Republican	
26		Chelsie J. Senerchia	1951	1953	Republican	
27		Abe Aronovitz	1953	1955	Republican	
28		Randy Christmas	1955	1957	Republican	
29		Robert King High	1957	1967	Democratic	
30		W. E. Master Johnson (acting)	1967	1967	Republican	
31		Stephen P. Clark	1967	1970	Democratic	
32		David T. Kennedy	1970	1973	Democratic	
33		Maurice Ferré	1973	1973	Democratic	
34		David T. Kennedy	1973	1973	Democratic	
35		Maurice Ferré	1973	1985	Democratic	
36		Xavier Suarez	1985	1993	Democratic	
37		Stephen P. Clark	1993	1996	Democratic	
38		Willy Gort (acting)	1996	1996	Republican	
39		Joe Carollo	1996	1997	Republican	
40		Xavier Suarez	1997	1998	Democratic	
41		Joe Carollo	1998	2001	Republican	
42		Manny Diaz	2001	2009	Independent	
43		Tomás Regalado	2009	2017	Republican	
44		Francis Suarez	2017	2025	Republican	
45		Eileen Higgins	2025	present	Democratic	

== See also ==
- Government of the City of Miami
- Mayoral elections in Miami
- Timeline of Miami
- List of mayors of Miami-Dade County, Florida, 1964–present
- Miami City Hall

== Bibliography ==
- Thomas J. Wood (1964). "Dade County: Unbossed, Erratically Led". Annals of the American Academy of Political and Social Science. 353.
- "The Outsiders", Miami Herald, February 1, 1998 (About voter fraud)
