= Coast Guard Air Station Dinner Key =

- United States Coast Guard Air Station Hangar at Dinner Key
- U.S. National Register of Historic Places
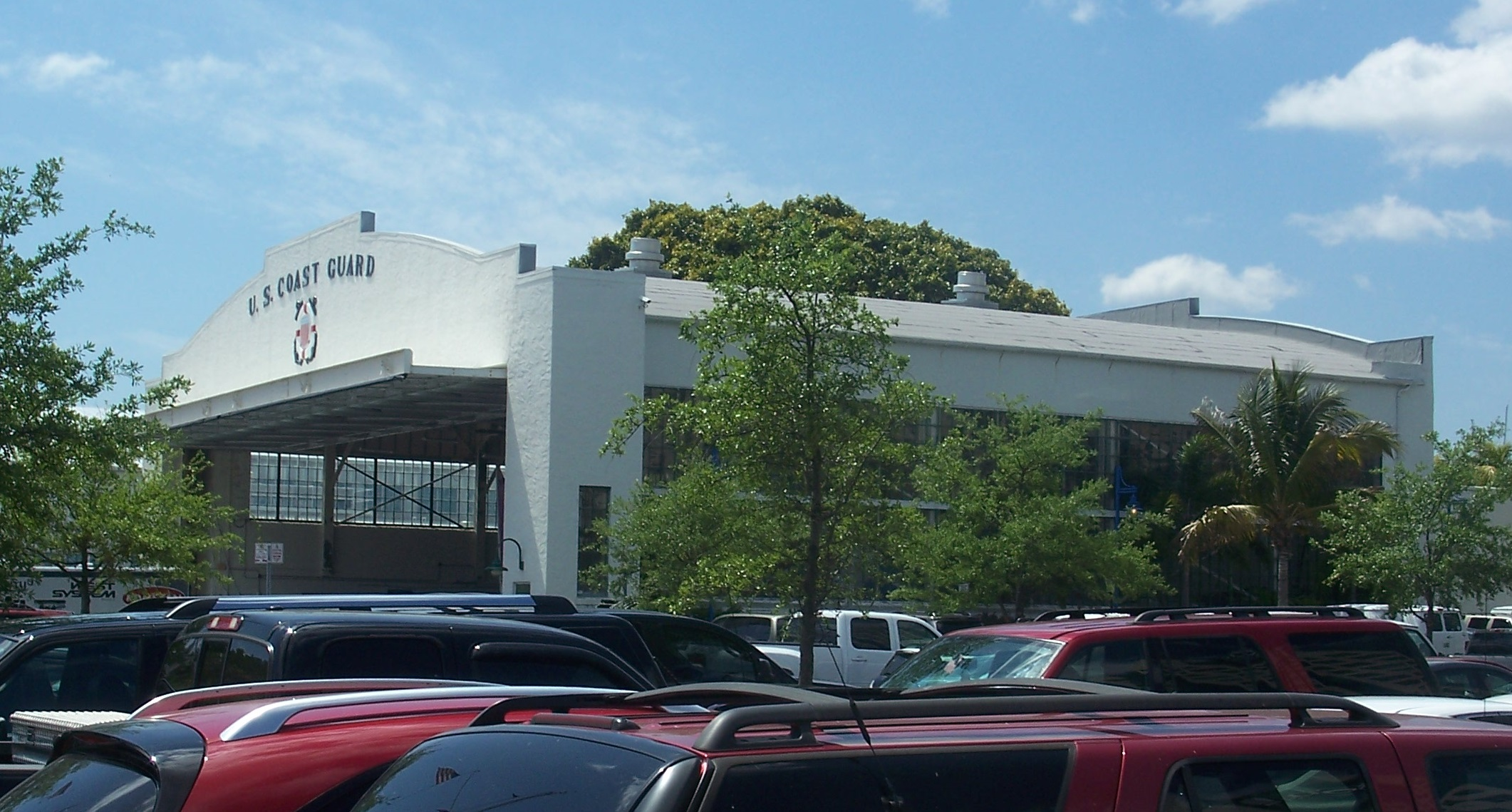
- Side and end of the hangar

- Location within Florida
- Coordinates: 25°43′52.39″N 80°14′02.23″W
- Built: 1917
- Architect: United States Coast Guard; Fred Howland
- Architectural style: Mission Revival/Moderne
- NRHP reference No.: 02001535
- Added to NRHP: February 20, 1975

Coast Guard Air Station Dinner Key is a former United States Coast Guard facility located in Dinner Key, Miami, Florida. It was built next to the International Pan American Airport.

== History ==
A United States Naval Air Station was established on Dinner Key in 1917. NAS Dinner Key, commanded by Lt. Cdr. Marc Mitscher, was the second largest naval air facility in the U.S. and was used to train seaplane pilots. The Air Station was closed shortly after the end of World War I. Later an airport was built here by Pan Am. The Navy took over the site during World War II, operating there from 1943 until 1945.

The United States Coast Guard operated a Coast Guard Air Station Dinner Key from 1932 until 1965, when operations were transferred to Coast Guard Air Station Miami at Opa-locka Airport. The former barracks and mess building were added to the U.S. National Register of Historic Places on August 10, 1995. On December 19, 2002, the US Coast Guard Air Station Hangar at Dinner Key was added to the U.S. National Register of Historic Places.
