= International Pan American Airport =

Former airport in Florida

Coordinates: 25°43′43.20″N 80°14′7.25″W

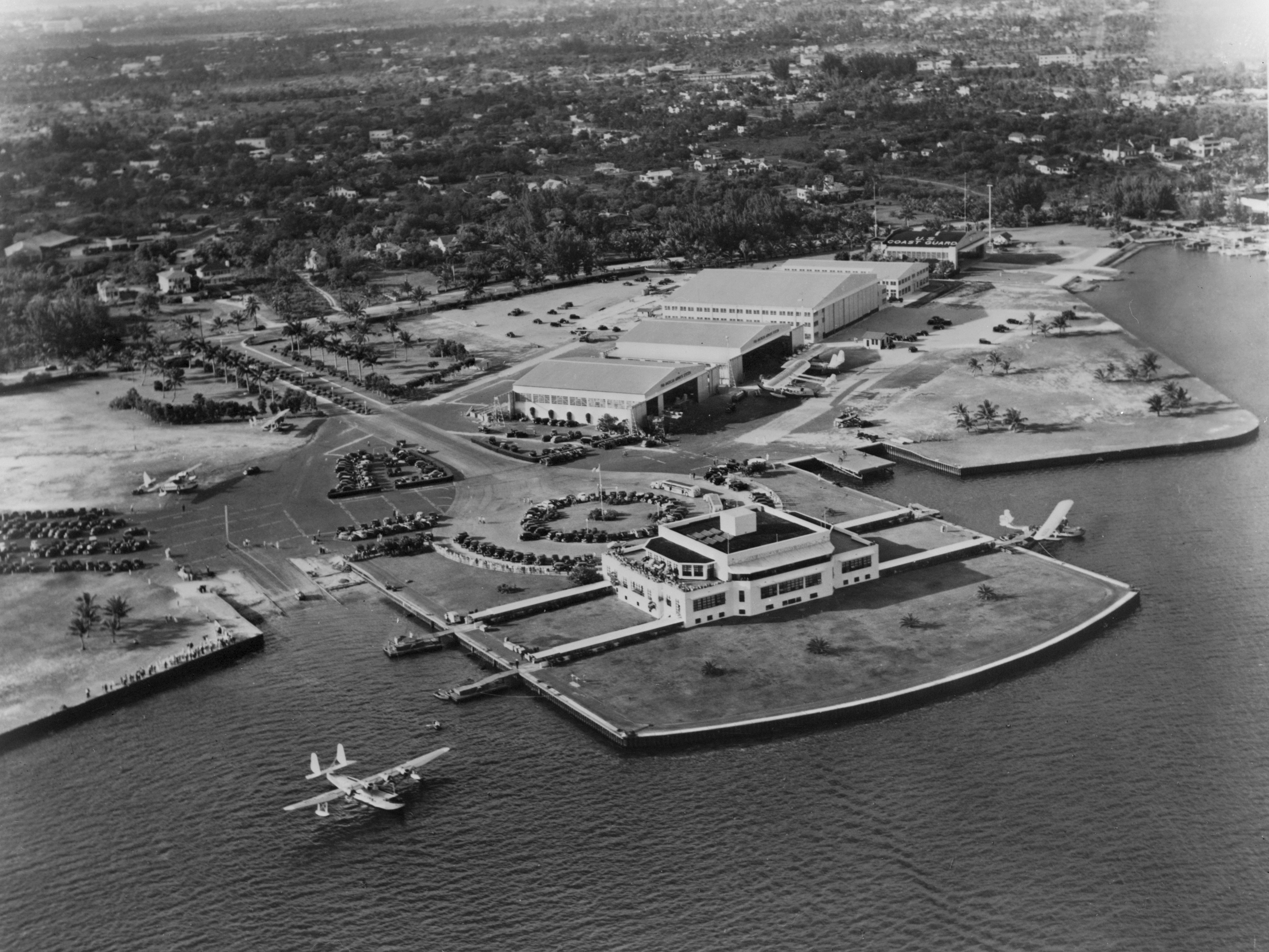
Airport image

International Pan American Airport is a former airport in Dinner Key, Miami, Florida operated by Pan American World Airways from 1932 to 1945. During its existence, it operated alongside Coast Guard Air Station Dinner Key.

== History ==
Dinner Key was the site of the first continental naval air station in the United States, which opened in 1918. The United States Navy vacated the facility following the end of World War I that year, and it was then used by commercial seaplane operators. The New York, Rio & Buenos Aires Airline began service at the airport in 1929 and merged into Pan Am in 1930.

Dinner Key served as a base for Pan American World Airways's flying boats during the 1930s and 1940s. It was one of the world's largest airports and the main hub for air traffic between North and South America. The inaugural flight from Dinner Key to Panama took place on December 1, 1930. Charles Lindbergh, who was a technical adviser to Pan Am, surveyed some of the early air routes. Because of inadequate landing facilities along the South American route, flying clipper ships were utilized by Pan Am, forming a vital link between North and South America. Pan Am opened an Art Deco terminal building at the airport in 1934, featuring a globe in its lobby that was 10 feet in diameter and weighed 3.5 tons. Pan Am operated Sikorsky S-41 and Sikorsky S-42 flying boats from the airport.

The Navy requisitioned the entire Dinner Key facility in 1943 and commissioned it as Dinner Key NAF. After the technological advances of World War II and the construction of suitable airports in South America made seaplanes largely obsolete, Pan Am transferred its operations to Miami International Airport, which had been in operation since 1928 as Pan American Field. Pan Am's final flight to Dinner Key took place August 9, 1945. This happened to be the same day an atomic bomb was dropped on Nagasaki, essentially ending World War II.

Today, the airport is the site of Miami City Hall, located in the old Pan Am terminal building. Two of Pan Am's hangars are still in use by the Grove Key Marina. The terminal's centerpiece globe was showcased in the lobby of Miami's Museum of Science from 1960 until the museum moved in 2015, and in 2022 was installed at the site of the Miami Worldcenter development.

== Gallery ==
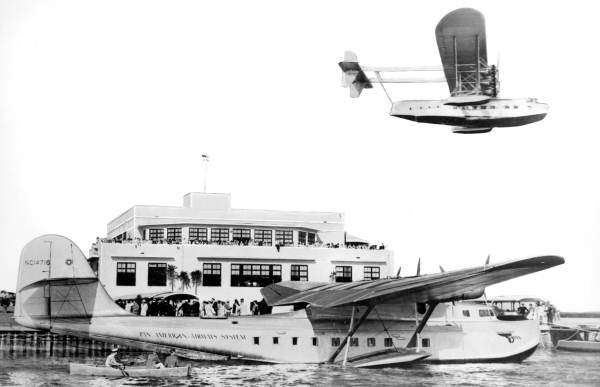
Seaplanes and terminal

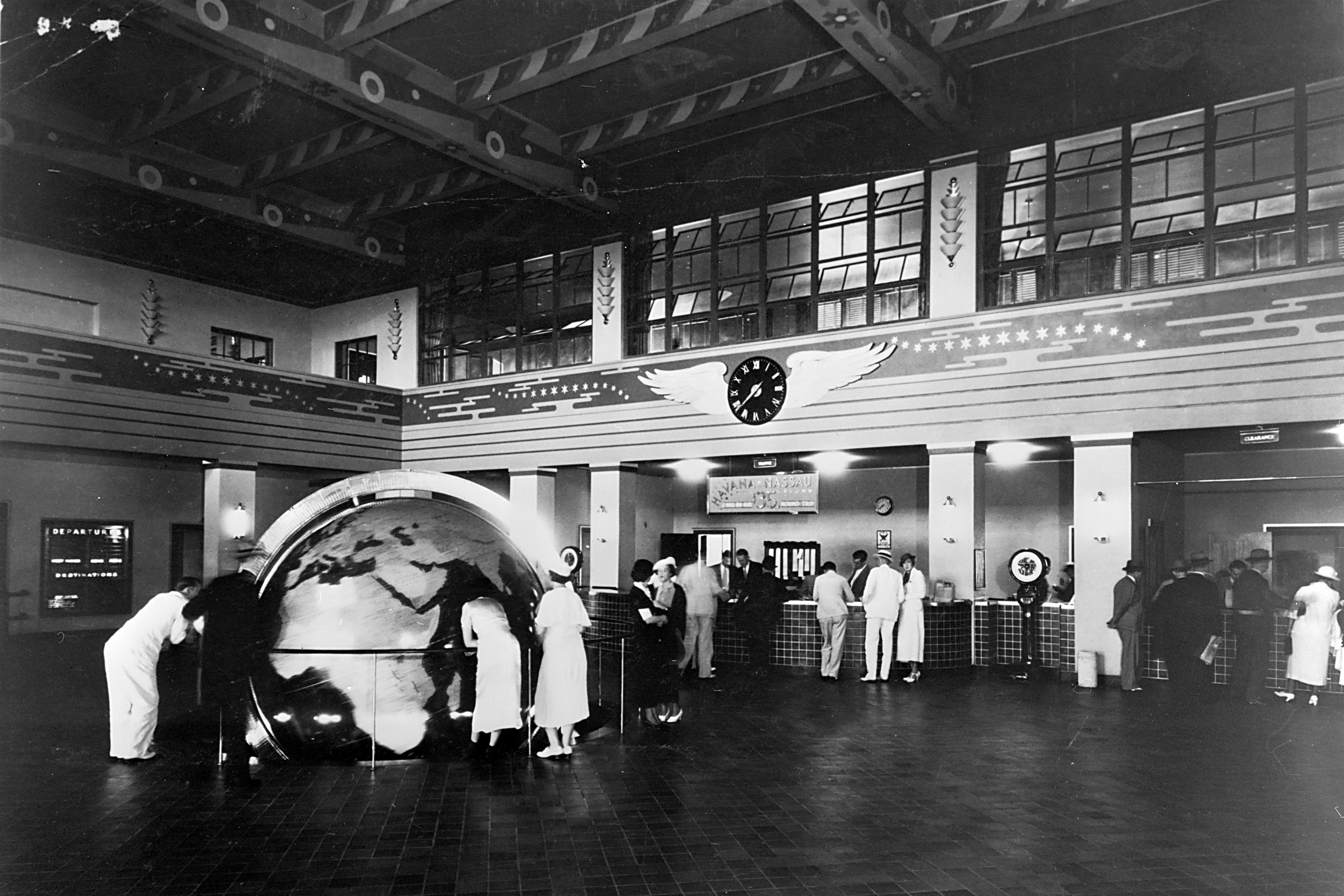
Pan Am terminal at Dinner Key in 1944
