= Dinner Key =

Marina, former sea plane base, in Miami

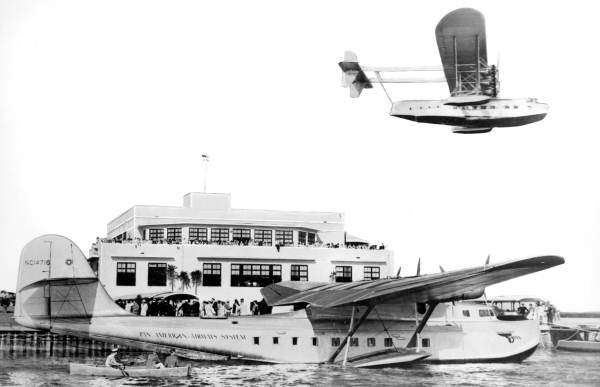
Dinner Key seaplane base, with passenger seaplanes

Dinner Key is a marina complex in the Coconut Grove neighborhood of Miami, Florida, along the shore of Biscayne Bay on South Bayshore Drive. It was originally an island, but was connected to the mainland in 1914 by filling in the intervening space. An early source attributes the name to the island being a convenient place to stop to eat while traveling by boat between the mouth of the Miami River and Snapper Creek south of Miami. Dinner Key is accessible by public transit via the Coconut Grove Circulator from the Miami Metrorail at Coconut Grove and Douglas Road stations. Formerly, it has been the location of Coast Guard Air Station Dinner Key and International Pan American Airport (whose terminal building is now Miami City Hall).

== Dinner Key Auditorium ==
One of Pan Am's hangars was used for many years as an exhibition hall and auditorium, the Dinner Key Auditorium, which was renamed the Coconut Grove Convention Center. From 2007 to 2013, the center was used as a permanent set for the USA television series Burn Notice. The building was demolished in early 2014 to make way for a new plan from the City of Miami.

=== Jim Morrison arrest ===
This was the site of the March 1, 1969 incident in which Jim Morrison of The Doors was arrested for allegedly exposing himself to the audience.

== Sources ==
- Florida, DK Eyewitness Travel Guides, 2004, pg. 83
