= Government of Miami =

System of government of US city

Flag of the City of Miami

The government of the city of Miami, Florida, is organized under the City Charter, which provides for a mayor-commissioner form of city government.

== Organization ==
=== City Commission and Mayor ===
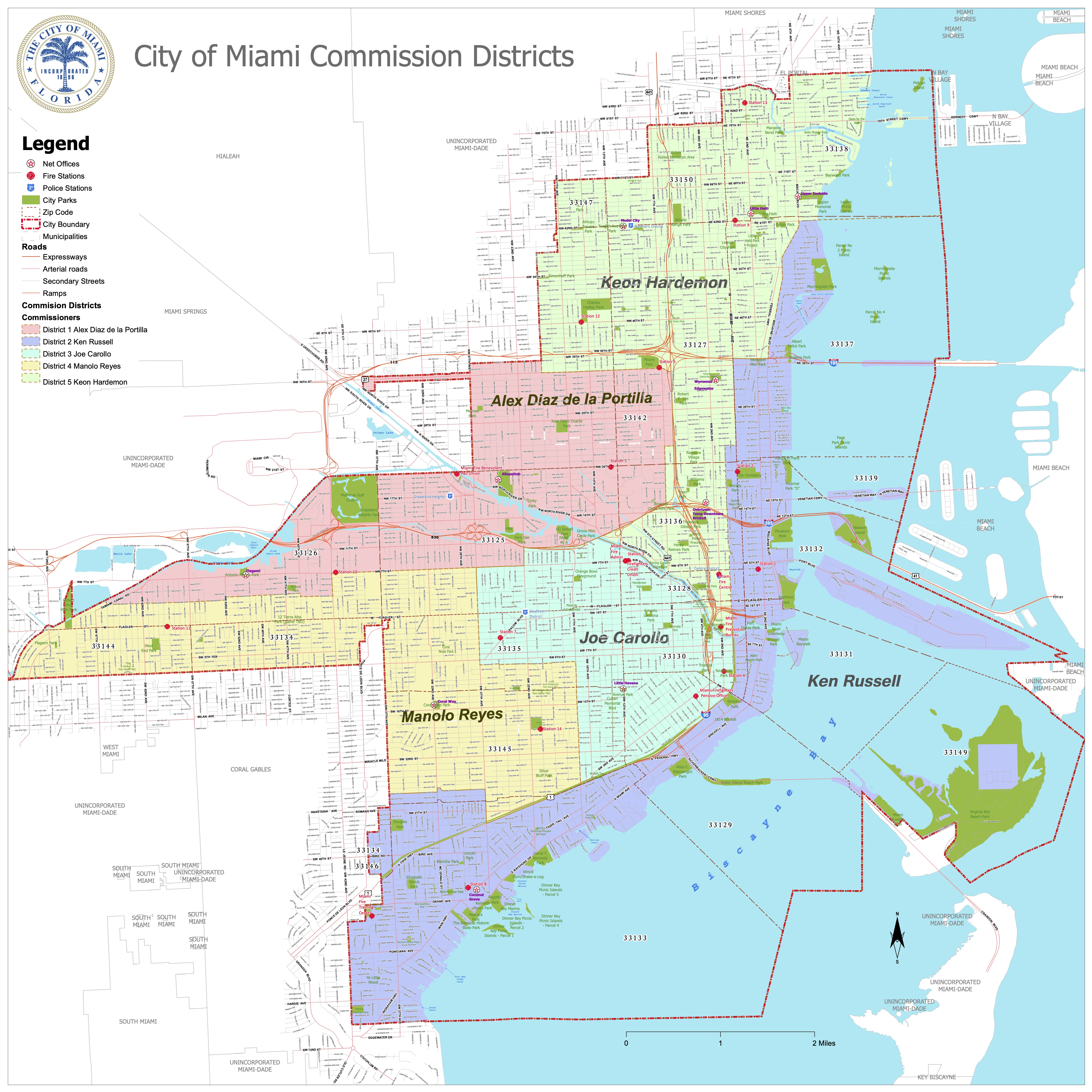
City of Miami Commission Districts Map 2019

The mayor of Miami, currently Eileen Higgins, is the city's executive and is directly elected; the mayor appoints a city manager to act as Miami's chief administrative officer.

Five city commissioners are also elected from single-member districts of which they are residents. City commissioners also must be qualified voters. The City Commission holds regular meetings in Miami City Hall, located at 3500 Pan American Drive in the neighborhood of Coconut Grove. The Commission has the power to pass ordinances, adopt regulations, and exercise other powers. All city commission offices and that of the mayor are nonpartisan.

- Miguel Angel Gabela - Commissioner, district 1 (Republican)
- Damián Pardo - Commissioner, district 2 (Democrat)
- Rolando Escalona - Commissioner, district 3 (Republican)
- Ralph "Rafael" Rosado - Commissioner, district 4 (Republican)
- Christine King - Commissioner, district 5 (Democrat)

=== Police Department ===
The Miami Police Department (MPD), often referred to as the City of Miami Police, is the main police department of Miami. Their jurisdiction lies within the actual city limits of Miami, but have mutual aid agreements with neighboring police departments. Art Acevedo is the chief of police. City of Miami police are distinguishable from their Miami-Dade counterparts by their blue uniforms and blue-and-white patrol vehicles.

=== Water and Sewer Department ===
Water and sewer service in Miami is maintained by the Miami-Dade Water and Sewer Department.

=== Other ===
- James Reyes - City Manager
- George Wysong - City Attorney
- Todd B. Hannon - City Clerk

== Federal and state representation ==
The United States Postal Service operates post offices in the city of Miami. The Miami Main Post Office, located at 2200 NW 72nd Avenue, is located outside of the city limits in unincorporated Miami-Dade County, adjacent to Miami International Airport.

== See also ==
- List of mayors of Miami
- Miami City Hall
- Government of Miami-Dade County
- Government of Florida

== Bibliography ==
- Public Administration Service (1954), Government of Metropolitan Miami, Public administration service, Chicago. Publications; no. 117, Chicago – via HathiTrust
- Milan J. Dluhy and Howard A. Frank (2002). Miami Fiscal Crisis: Can a Poor City Regain Prosperity?. Praeger.
