= S. Rodmond Smith =

Congressional Medal of Honor recipient

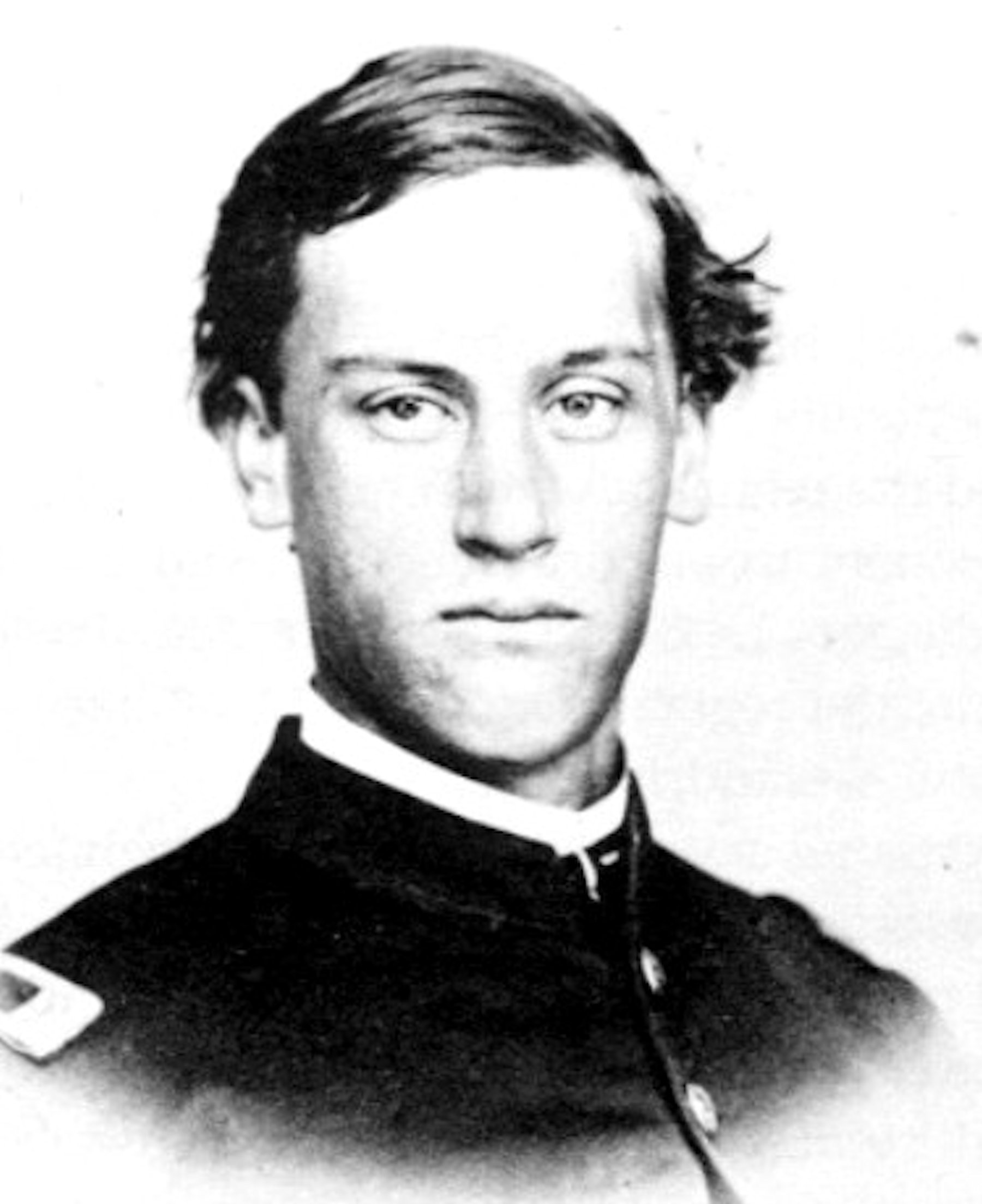
- Civil War era photo of SR Smith

5th Mayor of Miami
- In office 1911 – 1913 (resigned due to illness)
- Preceded by: F. H. Wharton
- Succeeded by: J.W. Watson

Personal details
- Born: Samuel Rodmond Smith; April 20, 1841 Wilmington, Delaware
- Died: 30 September 1912 (aged 71) Miami, Florida
- Spouse: Sarah Elizabeth Ware Smith
- Children: Bessie Wollaston Smith
- Occupation: Attorney

Military service
- Allegiance: Union Army
- Branch/service: United States Army
- Rank: Brevet Major
- Unit: 4th Delaware Infantry Regiment
- Commands: C Company
- Battles/wars: American Civil War
- Awards: Medal of Honor

Samuel Rodmond Smith (April 20, 1841 – September 30, 1912) was a Congressional Medal of Honor recipient in the Union Army during the U.S. Civil War. He was an attorney by vocation and became Mayor of Miami near the end of his life.

== Medal of Honor ==
The citation for Smith's Medal of Honor was for an act of bravery at Rowanty Creek, Va on Feb 5, 1865. It reads: "Swam the partly frozen creek under fire to establish a crossing." Smith swam the crossing with First Lieutenant David Eastburn Buckingham, who also earned the award. Smith and his regiment lost their leader as he was shot and carried to the rear shortly before they made their crossing. In an account of the events of that day, Smith said, "There was considerable floating ice in the stream," and, "The water proved to be over six feet deep."

== Civilian life ==
After the Civil War, Smith worked for Farmer's Mutual Insurance Company. Smith authored a memoir of Judge Leonard Eugene Wales published by the Delaware Historical Society. He was appointed Clerk of the US Court for the District of Delaware in 1873, where he worked for 30 years. Smith authored a pamphlet named The reclamation of the Florida Everglades.

Smith was a hotel owner. He bought a 20 Hp Maxwell Briscoe Touring Car, one of the few motor vehicles registered in South Florida in 1907.

In April 1911, he won second place in the city primary by only 31 votes. He was elected mayor in November. During his campaign for Miami Mayor, his opponents called him, 'Yankee' as a pejorative.

He died in Miami in shortly after resigning as the city's 5th Mayor. He willed a generous donation to the YMCA, the Women's Club and the Coconut Grove Library.

Smith was an avid golfer and joined The Tin Whistles, Pinehurst, NC in 1905.

== See also ==
- List of mayors of Miami
- Government of Miami
- History of Miami
- Timeline of Miami
- List of American Civil War Medal of Honor recipients

Political offices
Preceded by F. H. Wharton	Mayor of the City of Miami; 1911–1912	Succeeded by J.W. Watson
