= John Sewell (Miami) =

American politician (1867–1938)

John Washington Sewell

3rd Mayor of Miami
- In office 1903–1907
- Preceded by: J. E. Lummus
- Succeeded by: F. H. Wharton

Personal details
- Born: July 20, 1867 Elbert County, Georgia, US
- Died: December 1, 1938 (aged 71) Miami, Florida, US
- Spouse(s): Jessie Byrd Sewell, Anna Lousie Deans Sewell
- Children: John Jackson, Crozier Keller, Jacqueline Byrd

John Washington “Big John" Sewell (July 20, 1867 – December 1, 1938) was an American politician and businessman who served as the third mayor of Miami from 1903 to 1907.

John W Sewell was born in 1867 in Elbert County, Georgia. The four Sewell brothers (E.G., Herbert, John and Jerehmiah) were sons of Mary Albina Gaines Sewell and Jeremiah Washington Sewell, a Confederate veteran and medical doctor.

Sewell moved with his parents to Florida when he was 19 years old. Sewell, working for Henry Flagler, served as foreman and superintendent for the Florida East Coast Railway during the construction of the line from Jacksonville to Miami and later joined the hotel construction department. After helping to construct The Royal Poinciana Hotel and The Breakers Hotel at Palm Beach, Sewell moved to Miami in 1896 to work on the Royal Palm Hotel.

While working on the hotel, Sewell stumbled upon the burial grounds of the Tequesta Native-Americans. Sewell gave away some of the skulls as souvenirs, and ordered African-American laborers to move the remaining bones and bury them in a hole. Sewell remained in the employ of the Florida East Coast Railway until 1899, when he left to concentrate his efforts on the mercantile establishment jointly owned with this brother. They owned at least three retail businesses at one point.

He was Mayor of the City of Miami from 1903 to 1907.

After serving in local politics, Sewell began the construction of his house in 1912. Built on the highest point in the city, the house was named Halissee Hall from the Seminole word meaning "New Moon."

Sewell wrote a self-published autobiography entitled John Sewell's Memoirs and History of Miami, Florida. It included an appendix describing his witnessing the attempted assassination of president-elect Franklin D. Roosevelt in 1933. The book is valuable as a primary source of information on pioneer days in Miami.

In 1936 Sewell joined with 13 other people who had arrived in Miami before 1900 to found the Miami Pioneers Club.

His brother, E.G. Sewell was 13th, 16th and 19th Mayor of Miami.

John Sewell was buried in the Miami City Cemetery.

== See also ==
- List of mayors of Miami
- Government of Miami
- History of Miami
- Timeline of Miami

Political offices
Preceded by J. E. Lemus	Mayor of the City of Miami; 1903–1907	Succeeded by F. H. Wharton
