= F. H. Wharton =

American politician (1870–1956)

Frank H Wharton
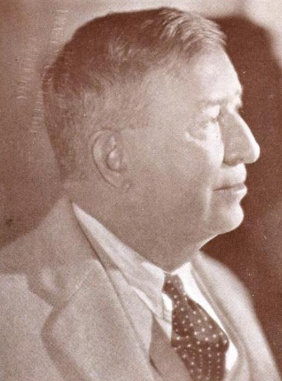

4th Mayor of Miami
- In office 1907–1911
- Preceded by: John Sewell (Miami)
- Succeeded by: Samuel Rodmond Smith

City Manager of Miami
- In office 1921–1926

Personal details
- Born: 11 April 1870 Ohio, US
- Died: 2 August 1956 (aged 86) Miami, Florida, US
- Party: Democratic
- Spouse: Ola B Hinson Wharton
- Children: Florence, Estelle, Floy Ruth, Fannie May, Fannette Ola
- Profession: Grocer

Frank Howard Wharton (April 11, 1870 – August 2, 1956) was a businessman and the fourth mayor of the city of Miami from 1907 to 1911.

== Life ==
Born in Rockbridge Ohio, Wharton was the son of farmers and moved to Miami in 1897, after working in Central Florida.

Wharton was a grocer. He owned the Magnolia Grocery Company. In 1907 Wharton was elected Mayor for a two-year term. He won re-election in 1909.

Wharton served as City Manager in 1921 and councilman on multiple occasions.

== See also ==
- List of mayors of Miami
- Government of Miami
- History of Miami

Political offices
Preceded by John Sewell (Miami)	Mayor of the City of Miami; 1907–1911	Succeeded by Samuel Rodmond Smith
Preceded by	City Manager of Miami; 1921–1926	Succeeded by
