= Timeline of Miami =

Coordinates: 25.787676°N 80.224145°W

The following is a timeline of the history of the city of Miami in Miami-Dade County, Florida, United States.

== 19th century ==
- 1870 – William Brickell establishes a trading post on the south side of the Miami River.
- 1880 – Population: county 100.
- 1884 – The first hotel, The Peacock Inn, is established in Coconut Grove.
- 1886
  - Ralph Munroe builds a home on the bay in Coconut Grove.
  - Kirk Munroe establishes a home in Coconut Grove.
- 1889 – Teaching begins in the first school building in Coconut Grove.
- 1891 – Julia Tuttle moves to Miami.
- 1895 – The first public library is established in Coconut Grove by the ladies of the Pine Needles Club.
- 1896
  - Miami incorporated; John B. Reilly becomes mayor.
  - Florida East Coast Railway (Jacksonville-Miami) arrives in Miami.
  - Miami Metropolis newspaper begins publication.
  - Biscayne Hotel built.
- 1897
  - Royal Palm Hotel in business.
  - City of Miami Cemetery established.
- 1898
  - Burdines in business.
  - David Fairchild establishes the USDA Plant Introduction Garden.
- 1899
  - Dade County seat relocated to Miami from Juno.
  - Telephone service begins in Miami.
- 1900
  - Flagler Public Library, Miami Board of Trade, and Woman's Club founded.
  - Population: 1,681.

== 20th century ==
=== 1900s-1940s ===
- 1902 – Carpenters Local 993 labor union established.
- 1903
  - John Sewell becomes mayor.
  - Ransom Everglades School is established in Coconut Grove.
  - The Miami Herald newspaper begins publication.
- 1906
  - Streetcars begin operating.
  - Automobile parade.
- 1909
  - City Hall built.
  - Lummus Park opens.
- 1910 – Population: 5,471; county 11,933.
- 1912 – Airport established near Miami.
- 1913
  - Bridge to Miami Beach constructed.
  - Lyric Theater opens.
- 1914 – Construction of Vizcaya begins.
- 1915
  - Miami Chamber of Commerce established.
  - Town of Miami Beach incorporated near Miami.
- 1916 – David Fairchild establishes The Kampong, his winter home in Coconut Grove.
- 1917 – Elser Pier opens.
- 1918 – Airdrome Theatre and Strand Theatre open.
- 1919
  - Coconut Grove is incorporated.
  - Great Miami Employers' Association established.
  - Seybold Canal Bridge built (approximate date).
- 1920
  - Universal Negro Improvement Association chapter established.
  - Population: 29,549; county 42,753.

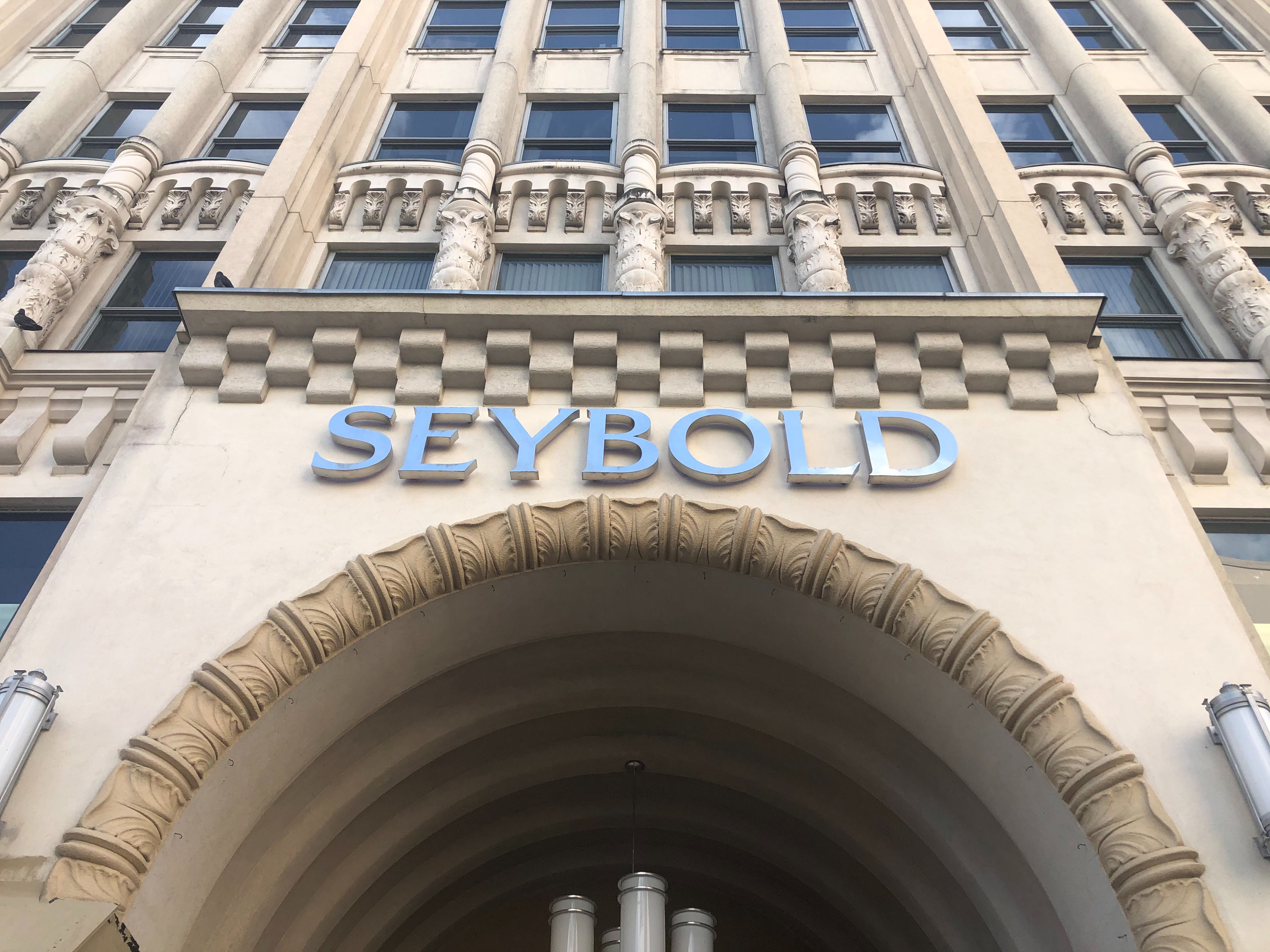
The Seybold Building in Miami. The first phase of construction was completed in 1921.

- 1921
  - Commission-manager form of government adopted.
  - WQAM radio begins broadcasting.
  - Tamiami Canal Bridge built.
- 1923 – Miami Times newspaper begins publication.
- 1924
  - Buena Vista becomes part of Miami.
  - Miami River Canal Swing Bridge built.
  - Fotosho Theatre opens.
- 1925
  - Allapattah, Coconut Grove, Lemon City, Silver Bluff, and West Little River become part of Miami.
  - Bayfront Park opens.
  - Towns of Coral Gables and Hialeah incorporated near Miami.
  - University of Miami established in Coral Gables.
- 1926
  - January 10: Prinz Valdemar ship sinks offshore.
  - September: Hurricane.
  - WIOD radio begins broadcasting.
  - Player's State Theater built.
  - Booker T. Washington High School, Olympia Theater, and Tower Theater open.
  - Town of Miami Shores incorporated near Miami.
  - Wometco – first movie theater, the Capital, opens.
- 1927
  - Flagler Theater opens.
  - E. G. Sewell becomes mayor.
  - Greater Bethel African Methodist Episcopal Church built.
  - Jewish Floridian newspaper begins publication.
- 1928
  - Pan American Field (airfield) begins operating.
  - Dade County Agricultural High school built.
  - Al Capone buys a home in Miami Beach.
- 1929 - Sears, Roebuck and Company Department Store opens.
- 1930
  - Miami Civic Center opens.
  - Population: 110,637.
- 1933
  - February 15: Chicago mayor Anton Cermak killed by anarchist in Bayfront Park.
  - E. G. Sewell becomes mayor again.
  - Ryder, the truck leasing company, founded in Miami.
- 1935
  - January 1: Orange Bowl football contest begins.
  - November: Hurricane.
- 1936 – Parrot Jungle established.
- 1937 – Burdine Stadium, and Liberty Square (housing complex) open.
- 1938 – Fairchild Tropical Botanic Garden opens to the public.
- 1939 – E. G. Sewell becomes mayor yet again.
- 1940
  - Historical Association of Southern Florida established.
  - Population: 172,172; county 267,739.
- 1941 – Dorsey Memorial Library opens.
- 1942
  - May: Portero del Llano ship sinks offshore during World War II.
  - Submarine Chaser Training Center established.
- 1943 – Urban League of Greater Miami established.
- 1946 – National Association for the Advancement of Colored People branch established in Liberty City.
- 1948 – Coconut Grove Citizens Committee for Slum Clearance and Civil Rights Congress chapter organized.
- 1949 – WTVJ (television) begins broadcasting.

=== 1950s-1970s ===
- 1950 – Population: 249,276; county 495,084.
- 1952 – Museum of Science and Natural History opens on Bayshore Drive.
- 1953
  - Diario Las Américas Spanish-language newspaper begins publication.
  - Howard Hughes Medical Institute founded in Miami.
- 1954 – Burger King founded in Miami.
- 1955 – Miami Seaquarium established.
- 1956 – WCKT (television) begins broadcasting.
- 1957
  - WPST-TV (television) begins broadcasting.
  - DuPont Plaza Hotel opens for business.
  - Robert King High elected mayor of Miami.
- 1958 – Catholic Diocese of Miami established.
- 1959
  - City public schools racially desegregated.
  - Dade County Junior College and Centro Hispano Católico founded.
  - Miami International Airport dedicated.
- 1960 – Population: 291,688; county 935,047.
- 1961 – Colegio de Belén relocates to Miami from Cuba.
- 1962 – Historical Museum of Southern Florida and Cruzada Educativa Cubana established.
- 1964
  - February 25. Cassius Clay defeats Sonny Liston for heavyweight champion of the world.
  - Chuck Hall becomes mayor of Dade County.
- 1965
  - Cuban exiles begin to arrive in city via U.S.-sponsored "freedom flights".
  - Florida International University established.
  - Ediciones Universal in business.
- 1966 The Miami Dolphins enter the American Football League as an expansion franchise
- 1968
  - August 5–8: 1968 Republican National Convention held in nearby Miami Beach.
  - August 7–8: 1968 Miami riot.
  - Miami Pop Festivals held near city in May and December.
- 1970
  - David T. Kennedy becomes mayor of city; Stephen P. Clark becomes mayor of Dade County.
  - Population: 334,859; county 1,267,792.
- 1971 – Latin Chamber of Commerce established.
- 1972
  - July: 1972 Democratic National Convention is held in nearby Miami Beach.
  - August: 1972 Republican National Convention is also held in Miami Beach.
  - September: Florida International University opens.
  - One Biscayne Tower is built.
  - Miami Dolphins have their undefeated "perfect" season.
  - Jack Orr becomes mayor of Dade County.
  - November: "Decade of Progress" bond is passed, providing the funding for the Center for the Fine Arts.
- 1973
  - April: U.S.-sponsored "freedom flight" arrivals to Miami of Cuban exiles ends.
  - Barnacle Historic State Park established.
  - Maurice Ferre becomes city mayor.
- 1974
  - Stephen P. Clark becomes mayor of Dade County again.
  - Spanish American League Against Discrimination headquartered in city.
- 1975
  - The Bee Gees move to Miami Beach.
- 1976
  - El Miami Herald Spanish-language newspaper begins publication.
  - Bicentennial Park opens.
- 1977
  - Foreign trade zone established.
  - Black Archives History & Research Foundation of South Florida headquartered in city.
  - Omni International Mall in business.

=== 1980s-1990s ===
- 1980
  - May: race riots in Overtown and Liberty City after the death of Arthur McDuffie.
  - April–October: Cubans arrive in city via Mariel boatlift.
  - Miami MetroZoo opens near city.
  - Population: 346,865;
- 1981
  - Palace apartment building constructed.
  - Cuban American National Foundation headquartered in city.
- 1982
  - Knight International Center (convention center) opens.
  - Facts About Cuban Exiles organization established.
  - 1982 Overtown riot occurs.
- 1983
  - The movie Scarface, which is set in Miami, is released.
  - Christo unveils Surrounded Islands.
- 1984
  - Metrorail begins operating.
  - Center for Fine Arts
  - Miami International Film Festival begins.
  - Southeast Financial Center built on Biscayne Boulevard.
  - Miami Vice, a crime drama television series, debuts on NBC. It will run from 1984 to 1989.
  - First edition of the Miami International Book Fair.
- 1985
  - Miami SunPost newspaper begins publication.
  - Xavier Suarez becomes city mayor.
  - Stephen P. Clark Government Center built.
  - The Golden Girls, a television sitcom set in Miami, begins its seven-year run.
  - Miami City Ballet debuts.
- 1986 – Lincoln Center built.
- 1987
  - November: Pope John Paul II visits city.
  - Miami New Times newspaper in publication.
  - Miami Tower built.
- 1989
  - Ileana Ros-Lehtinen becomes U.S. representative for Florida's 18th congressional district.
- 1990
  - Nelson Mandela visits city.
  - Knight Foundation headquartered in city.
  - Population: 358,548; county 1,937,094.
- 1992 – August: Hurricane Andrew.
- 1993
  - Stephen P. Clark becomes city mayor.
  - Carrie P. Meek becomes U.S. representative for Florida's 17th congressional district.
- 1994
  - Eleventh Street (Metromover station) opens.
  - 1st Summit of the Americas held in city.
- 1996
  - Willy Gort becomes mayor of city, succeeded by Joe Carollo; Alex Penelas becomes mayor of Dade County.
  - City website online (approximate date).
  - Pottinger v. City of Miami homeless-related lawsuit decided.
  - Liberty City Charter School established.
- 1997
  - May 12: Tornado.
  - November: Mayoral election held.
  - Dade County renamed Miami-Dade County.
- 1998
  - January: Xavier Suarez becomes mayor again.
  - March: Mayoral election results of 1997 judged invalid; Carollo becomes mayor again.
- 1999
  - American Airlines Arena opens.
  - Ultra Festival begins.

=== 2000s ===
- 2000
  - Elián González affair.
  - Population: 362,470; county 2,253,362.
  - Town of Miami Lakes incorporated near Miami.

== 21st century ==
=== 2000s ===
- 2001
  - Cuban Genealogy Club of Miami founded.
  - Manny Diaz becomes city mayor.
- 2002 – Art Basel begins in Miami Beach.
- 2003
  - Four Seasons Hotel Miami built.
  - City of Miami Gardens incorporated near Miami.
- 2004 – Carlos Alvarez becomes mayor of Miami-Dade County.
- 2006 – Carnival Center opens.
- 2007
  - Ferguson U.S. Courthouse built.
  - Fictional Burn Notice television series begins its seven-year run.
- 2008 – Marquis Residences and 900 Biscayne Bay built on Biscayne Boulevard.
- 2009 – Tomás Regalado becomes city mayor.

=== 2010s ===
- 2010
  - Port of Miami Tunnel construction begins.
  - Population: 399,457; county 2,496,435; metro 5,564,635.
- 2011
  - Carlos A. Giménez becomes mayor of Miami-Dade County.
  - Vice City Rollers (roller derby league) formed.
  - Frederica Wilson becomes U.S. representative for Florida's 17th congressional district.
- 2015
  - Marco Rubio presidential campaign, 2016 headquartered in Miami.
  - The Miami Science Museum's Coconut Grove location closes
- 2017
  - January: City revises its illegal-immigrant sanctuary policy.
  - The new Miami Science Museum's location opens

== See also ==
- History of Miami
- List of mayors of Miami
- National Register of Historic Places listings in Miami, Florida
- Government of Miami-Dade County
- Timelines of other cities in the South Florida area of Florida: Boca Raton, Fort Lauderdale, Hialeah, Hollywood, Miami Beach, West Palm Beach

== Bibliography ==
=== Published in the 20th century ===
==== 1900s-1940s ====
- Miami City Directory (Miami, Florida, 1904)
- "Miami". Florida Gazetteer and Business Directory 1907-1908. R. L. Polk & Co.
  - 1918 ed.
- "Miami of Today", Florida East Coast Homeseeker, vol. 10, March 1908
- Miami City Directory. R.L. Polk & Co. 1919.
  - 1920 ed.
- "Points of Interest in Miami, Fla.". Automobile Blue Book. Vol. 6. 1919. map
- E. V. Blackman (1921), Miami and Dade County, Florida, Washington, D.C.: V. Rainbolt, OCLC 1580474
- Daniel Decatur Moore; et al., eds. (1922). "Miamia". Men of the South. New Orleans: Southern Biographical Association.
- Kenneth L. Roberts (April 29, 1922), "Tropical Growth", Saturday Evening Post, p. 8+
- Isador Cohen, Historical Sketches and Sidelights of Miami (Miami, 1925)
- Munroe, Ralph Middleton and Gilpin, Vincent. The Commodore's Story. New York: Ives Washburn, 1930. OCLC 001615563.
- T. H. Weigall, Boom in Paradise (New York, 1932)
- John Sewell (1933). Memoirs and History of Miami. Miami.
- Federal Writers’ Project (1939). Florida: a Guide to the Southernmost State. American Guide Series. New York: Oxford University Press. p. 207+.
- Federal Writers’ Project (1941). "Chronology". Planning Your Vacation in Florida Miami and Dade County. American Guide Series. Northport, New York: Bacon, Percy & Daggett.
- "Tequesta", Tequesta: The Journal of the Historical Association of Southern Florida, Historical Association of Southern Florida, ISSN 0363-3705 – via Florida International University 1941-

==== 1950s-1970s ====
- Helen Muir, Miami, U. S. A. (New York, 1953)
- Ruby Leach Carson, "Miami: 1896 to 1900", Tequesta, XVI (1956)
- James E. Buchanan (1978), Howard B. Furer (ed.), Miami: a chronological & documentary history, 1513-1977, American Cities Chronology Series, Dobbs Ferry, N.Y.: Oceana Publications, ISBN 0379006162
- Paul S. George, "Colored Town: Miami's Black Community, 1896–1930", Florida Historical Quarterly (April 1978)

==== 1980s-1990s ====
- Paul George, "Passage to a New Eden", Florida Historical Quarterly, 59 (1981)
- Thelma Peters (1985), Miami, 1909, With Excerpts from Fannie Clemons' Diary, Miami
- T. D. Allman (1987). Miami: City of the Future. New York: Atlantic Monthly. ISBN 0871131021.
- Joan Didion (1987). Miami. Simon & Schuster. ISBN 0671646648.
- Raymond A. Mohl (Spring 1987). "Trouble in Paradise: Race and Housing in Miami during the New Deal Era". Prologue: The Journal of the National Archives. 19. hdl:2027/mdp.39015028748500.
- David Rieff (1987), Going to Miami: Exiles, Tourists, and Refugees in the New America, New York: Little, Brown and Company, ISBN 0747500649
- Arva Moore Parks. Miami: The Magic City. Miami: Centennial Press, 1991.
- Guillermo J. Grenier; Alex Stepick III, eds. (1992). Miami Now! Immigration, Ethnicity, and Social Change. University Press of Florida. ISBN 081301154X.
- Alejandro Portes; Alex Stepick (1993). City on the Edge: The Transformation of Miami. University of California Press. ISBN 0520082176.
- Ramón Grosfoguel (1994). "World Cities in the Caribbean: The Rise of Miami and San Juan". Review. 17 (3). Fernand Braudel Center, State University of New York: 351–381. JSTOR 40241296. (Abstract)
- David Rieff (1993). The Exile: Cuba in the Heart of Miami. New York: Simon & Schuster. ISBN 0671886274.
- George Thomas Kurian (1994), "Miami, Florida", World Encyclopedia of Cities, Vol. 1: North America, Santa Barbara, California: ABC-CLIO – via Internet Archive (fulltext)
- María Cristina García (1996). Havana USA: Cuban Exiles and Cuban Americans in South Florida, 1959-1994. University of California Press. ISBN 978-0-520-91999-0.
- Paul S. George (Summer 1996). "Miami: One Hundred Years of History". South Florida History. 24 (2).
- Sheila L. Croucher (1997), Imagining Miami: ethnic politics in a postmodern world, Charlottesville: University Press of Virginia, ISBN 0813917042
- Marvin Dunn, Black Miami in the Twentieth Century (Gainesville, Florida, 1997)
- Jan Nijman (1997). "Globalization to a Latin Beat: The Miami Growth Machine". Annals of the American Academy of Political and Social Science. 551: 164–177. doi:10.1177/0002716297551001012. JSTOR 1047945. S2CID 154895047.
- Remy Tremblay (1997), "Bibliography of the Social and Cultural Geography of Miami, Florida", Florida Geographer, 28, ISSN 0739-0041 – via Florida Atlantic University
- Gregory W. Bush (1999). ""Playground of the USA": Miami and the Promotion of Spectacle". Pacific Historical Review. 68 (2): 153–172. doi:10.2307/3641982. JSTOR 3641982.
- Christian Girault (1999). "Miami y las nuevas relaciones interamericanas" [Miami and the New Inter-American Relations]. Foro Internacional (in Spanish). 39 (1). El Colegio de México: 17–64. JSTOR 27738931.
- Guillermo J. Grenier; Max J. Castro (1999). "Triadic Politics: Ethnicity, Race, and Politics in Miami, 1959-1998". Pacific Historical Review. 68 (2): 273–292. doi:10.2307/3641988. JSTOR 3641988.
- Raymond A. Mohl (1999). "'South of the South?' Jews, Blacks, and the Civil Rights Movement in Miami, 1945-1960". Journal of American Ethnic History. 18 (2): 3–36. JSTOR 27502414.

=== Published in the 21st century ===
- Raymond A. Mohl (2001). "Whitening Miami: Race, Housing, and Government Policy in Twentieth-Century Dade County". Florida Historical Quarterly. 79 (3): 319–345. JSTOR 30150856.
- David A. Badillo (2002). "Catholicism and the Search for Nationhood in Miami's Cuban Community". U.S. Catholic Historian. 20 (4): 75–90. JSTOR 25154831.
- Thomas A. Castillo (2004). "Miami's Hidden Labor History". Florida Historical Quarterly. 82 (4): 438–467. JSTOR 30149960.
- Lisa N. Konczal (2005). "Miami Diasporas". In Melvin Ember; et al. (eds.). Encyclopedia of Diasporas. Springer. p. 524+. ISBN 978-0-306-48321-9.
- Melanie Shell-Weiss (2005). "Coming North to the South: Migration, Labor and City-Building in Twentieth-Century Miami". Florida Historical Quarterly. 84 (1): 79–99. JSTOR 30150917.
- George Yúdice (2005). "Miami: Images of a Latinopolis". NACLA Report on the Americas. 39 (3).
- David Goldfield, ed. (2007). "Miami, Florida". Encyclopedia of American Urban History. Sage. pp. 467–470. ISBN 978-1-4522-6553-7.
- Chanelle Rose (2007). "'Jewel' of the South?: Miami, Florida and the NAACP's Struggle for Civil Rights in America's Vacation Paradise". Florida Historical Quarterly. 86 (1): 39–69. JSTOR 30150099.
- José Quiroga (2009). "Miami Remake". In Rebecca Biron (ed.). City/Art: The Urban Scene in Latin America. Duke University Press. p. 145+. ISBN 978-0-8223-9073-2.
- Juliet F. Gainsborough (2012), "A tale of two cities: civic culture and public policy in Miami", in Laura A. Reese and Raymond A. Rosenfeld (ed.), Comparative Civic Culture: the Role of Local Culture in Urban Policy-Making, Burlington, Vermont: Ashgate, ISBN 9781409436546
- American Cities Project (2013). "Miami". America's Big Cities in Volatile Times: City Profiles. Washington, D.C.: Pew Charitable Trusts.
- Chanelle Nyree Rose (2015). Struggle for Black Freedom in Miami: Civil Rights and America's Tourist Paradise, 1896-1968. Louisiana State University Press. ISBN 978-0-8071-5767-1.
