= John B. Reilly =

American politician (1870–1928)

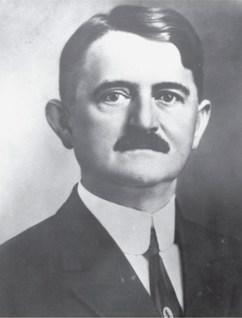

1st Mayor of Miami
- In office July 1896 – November 1900
- Succeeded by: J.E. Lummus

Personal details
- Born: May 18, 1870 New Haven, Connecticut, US
- Died: November 15, 1928 (aged 58) Miami, Florida, US
- Resting place: Miami City Cemetery
- Spouse: Marie A. MacDonald
- Children: Joseph Albert; Eleanore Marie; Wallace Reilly

John B. Reilly (May 18, 1870 – November 15, 1928) was an American politician who served as the first Mayor of Miami.

John B. Reilly was born in Connecticut on May 18, 1870. In 1886, he became a shipping clerk in Branford, Connecticut. He moved to Florida in 1893 accepting the position of bookkeeper and cashier for the firm of McQuire & McDonald, who contracted with Henry M. Flagler and built his hotels. He was then appointed as a manager of Florida East Coast Railway in 1896 and acted as company spokesman in Miami, Florida. The city was incorporated shortly after his arrival and due to his key role with the Florida East Coast Railway he was elected mayor in 1896 serving four consecutive 1 year terms. On August 7, 1896, the Rileys welcomed the birth of their son, Joseph Albert Riley, the first white baby born in the new city of Miami.

Reilly served as United States Commissioner for the southern district of Florida being appointed in 1897. In March, 1914, he became associated with the developments of James Deering's Summer House Villa Vizcaya and acted as financial agent until 1921. He was director of the Bank of Bay Biscayne, a business that several other city mayors including J.E. Lummus and E.C Romfh were involved with. He was director of Reilly, Stoms & Paxton and a director of Miami Realty Corporation.

== See also ==
- List of mayors of Miami
- Government of Miami
- History of Miami
- Timeline of Miami

Political offices
Preceded by None	Mayor of the City of Miami; 1896-1900	Succeeded by J E Lummus
