= Ku Klux Klan raid of La Paloma nightclub =

Attack on LGBT nightclub

Coordinates: 25.8397°N 80.2417°W

- Location: Unincorporated Dade County, Florida
- Date: November 15, 1937
- Target: La Paloma nightclub patrons and workers
- Perpetrator: 200 Ku Klux Klan night riders
- Motive: Closing of La Paloma nightclub
- Charges: 0
- Convictions: 0

On November 15, 1937, about 200 Ku Klux Klan members stormed the popular LGBT-serving nightclub, La Paloma, in an unincorporated area of Dade County, Florida, ordering patrons to leave and shutting the nightclub down for the evening.

== Background ==
Miami had recently begun to shift to cater to tourists. Local businesses intended to draw tourist money by offering Miami as a more modern alternative to Havana. To cater to tourists, many local businesses expected a relaxed approach from the vice police to gambling, and more acceptance of foreigners. Some grew frustrated with Miami's new tourism-based economy and began an anti-vice crusade. These included construction workers affected by business failings in the area. This crusade began during Prohibition and led to the revitalization of the Ku Klux Klan in the Miami area.

La Paloma nightclub's performance offerings included early drag queens known as "female impersonators" singing and telling jokes, and women stripping. It was generally understood to cater specifically to LGBT patrons. Many locals called it indecent. Club owner Al Youst had already been arrested six times, but to many residents it seemed that the arrests would not shut the club down.

== Raid ==
On the night of November 15, 1937, hooded members of the Ku Klux Klan gathered at Moore Park in Miami to induct 125 new members. They burned a cross before they assaulted the La Paloma nightclub. For the first time in ten years, the Ku Klux Klan conducted a "night ride" in the Miami area. Around 200 "night riders" (members responsible for burnings and floggings) walked directly into the nightclub. Klan members began smashing furniture, roughing up workers, and threatening to burn the building down, all while ordering everyone out of the club. One Klan member explained during the attack that "the visit came because neighborhood residents were afraid of Youst and did not want to appear against him in a court complaint."

== Aftermath ==
Soon after the Ku Klux Klan raid, Dade County Sheriff David Coleman called the club a "menace" and vowed to keep it legally closed. Coleman ordered the nightclub to stop operations after the Ku Klux Klan raid and then ordered a police raid there two weeks later. La Paloma reopened again within weeks. The club's manager claimed the club offered "spicier entertainment than ever". A new skit performed at the club featured performers satirizing the Klan raid and donning white hoods.

A stronger sense of unity came to Miami's LGBT community, and La Paloma nightclub became a symbol of LGBT resistance in the city.

== See also ==
- Battle of Hayes Pond
- Ku Klux Klan raid (Inglewood)
