= Royal Palm Hotel (Miami) =

Former hotel in Florida, US

Royal Palm Hotel, Miami
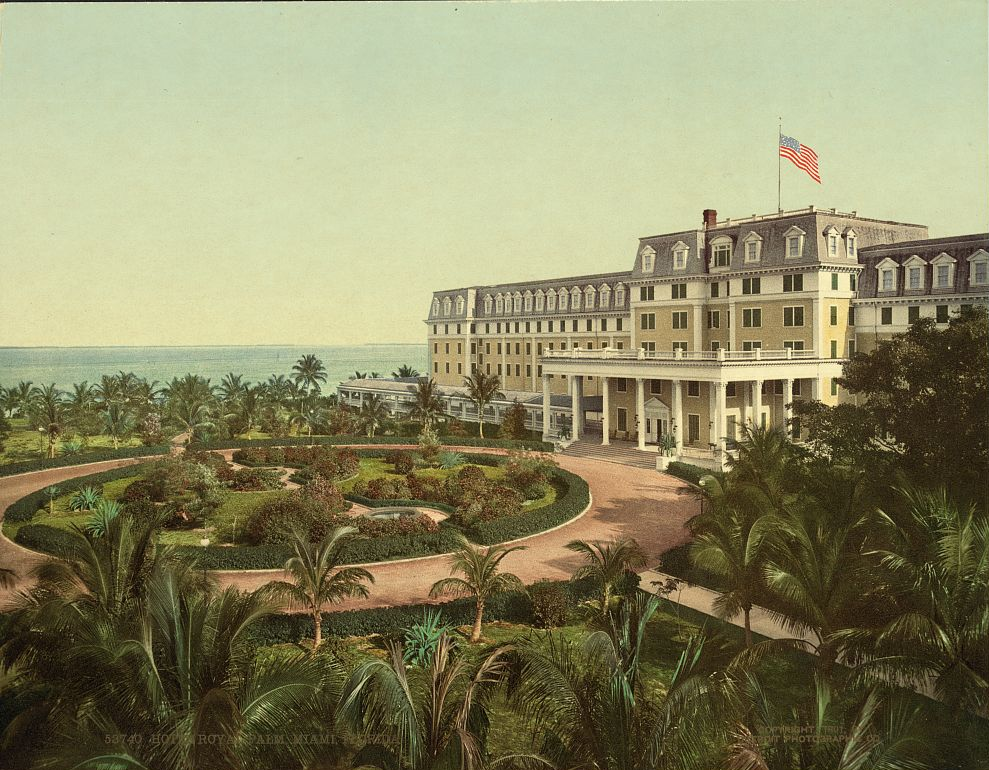
- West front of the hotel, c. 1901.
- Interactive map of the Royal Palm Hotel, Miami area

General information
- Location: Miami, Florida, United States
- Coordinates: 25°46′16.91″N 80°11′18.99″W
- Opened: January 16, 1897

The Royal Palm Hotel was a large resort hotel built by railroad magnate Henry Flagler in Miami, Florida. Opened on January 16, 1897, the Royal Palm Hotel was one of the first hotels in the Miami area.

== History ==
The hotel sat on the north bank of the Miami River where it overlooked Biscayne Bay. Five stories tall with a sixth-floor salon, the Royal Palm Hotel featured the city's first electric lights, elevators and swimming pool. Almost thirty years later, The Royal Palm Hotel was grievously damaged by the 1926 hurricane, and infested with termites. In 1930, it was condemned and torn down.

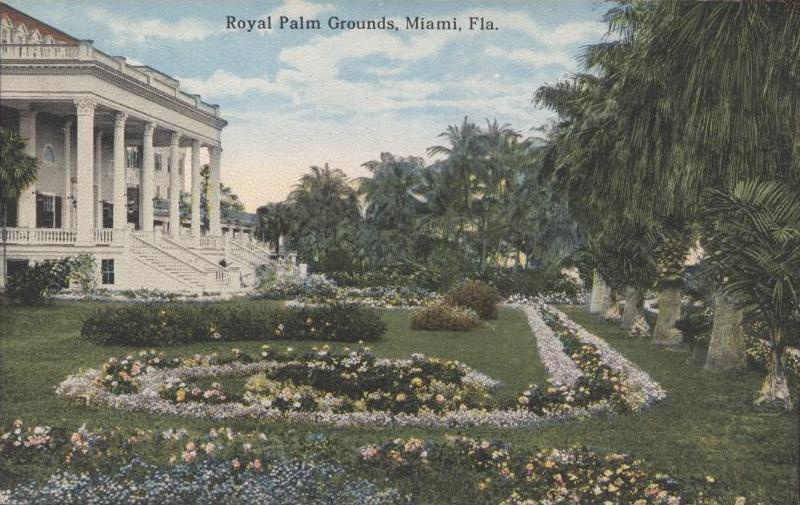
Hotel and grounds in c. 1912

The hotel was built on the site of a Tequesta village. A large mound was removed to make way for the hotel veranda. Between 50 and 60 skulls were found in the mound, and tossed into barrels and sinkholes. Some were later given away as souvenirs. Construction crews also removed evidence of the Spanish mission and slave plantation that existed on the site decades earlier.

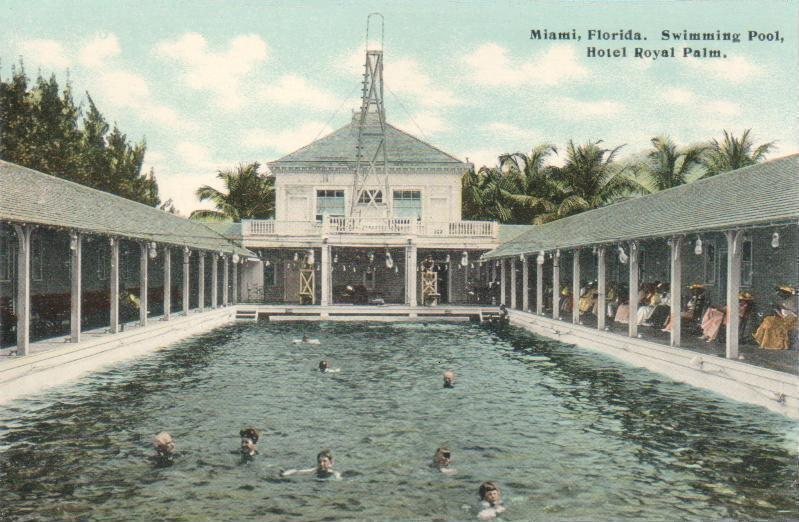
Swimming pool in c. 1912

The hotel stretched 680 feet (210 m) along the Miami River's north bank. A veranda surrounded the hotel, about one-sixth of a mile in length. The hotel was described as "modern Colonial", with an air of "decorous opulence". There were 450 guest rooms and suites. The average guest room was twelve feet by eighteen feet, and 100 of the rooms had private baths. The main dining room would seat 500 guests. A second dining room was for maids and children. There were also private dining rooms. There were parlors, a billiards room, other game rooms, a 45-foot (14 m) by 50-foot (15 m) ballroom, and 100 dressing rooms at the swimming pool. The boiler room, electric plant, kitchens, laundry and ice-makers were in a separate building. The hotel had a staff of 300, including sixteen cooks. Although, at the insistence of Julia Tuttle, a clause prohibiting the sale of alcoholic beverages had been included in all land deeds for the new city of Miami, the Royal Palm Hotel had an exemption to serve alcohol to its guests during the three months of the tourist season.

The construction of the Royal Palm brought many of the pioneers who would make Miami into a booming city. John B. Reilly (first mayor), John Sewell (3rd mayor and developer) and E. G. Sewell (3-time mayor and promoter) would arrive in Miami in February of 1896 to work on the Royal Palm.
