= Miami City Cemetery =

Historic cemetery in Miami-Dade County, Florida

- City of Miami Cemetery
- U.S. National Register of Historic Places
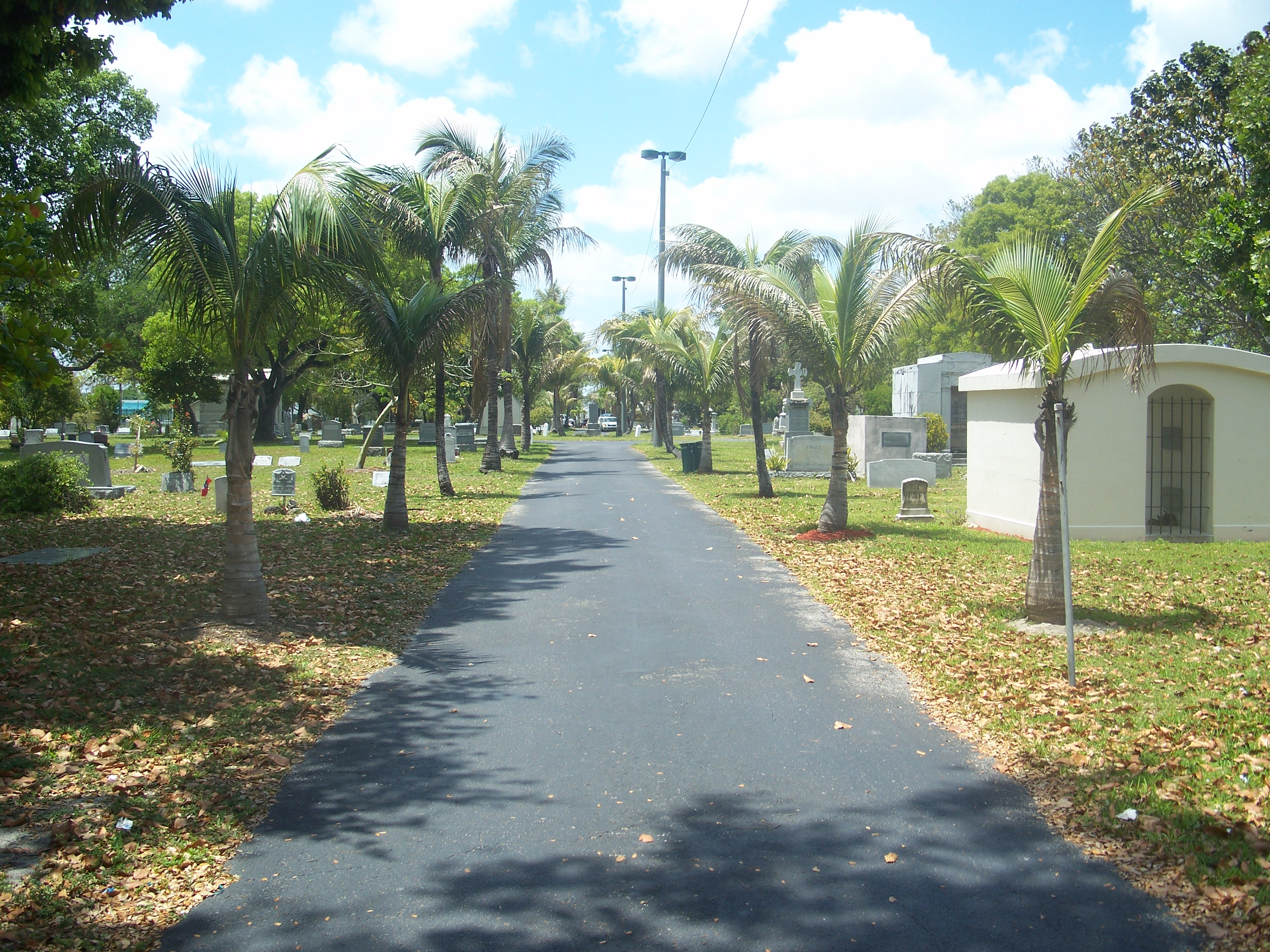

- Location within Miami Location within Florida Location within the United States
- Location: Miami, Florida
- Coordinates: 25°47′36″N 80°11′33″W
- MPS: Downtown Miami MRA
- NRHP reference No.: 88002960
- Added to NRHP: January 4, 1989

The Miami City Cemetery is a historic cemetery in Miami, Florida, United States. It is located at 1800 Northeast 2nd Avenue. It is the only municipal cemetery in Miami-Dade County. On January 4, 1989, it was added to the U.S. National Register of Historic Places.

== History ==
Miami City Cemetery was located one-half mile north of the city limits on a narrow wagon track county road. The first burial, not recorded, was of an elderly black man on July 14, 1897. The first recorded burial was a white man named Graham Branscomb, a 24-year-old Englishman who died on July 20, 1897, from consumption. The city of Miami cemetery is subdivided with whites on the east end and the blacks population on the west end.

Blacks provided the primary labor force for building of Miami but were confined by clauses in land deeds to the north west section of Miami now known as Overtown. In 1915, the Beth David congregation began a Jewish section. Two other prominent sections are the circles: the first to Julia Tuttle, the "Mother of Miami," buried in 1898; the second, a memorial to Civil War veterans erected by the United Daughters of the Confederacy. Sixty-six Confederate and twenty-seven Union veterans are buried here. Other sections are dedicated to Catholics, American Legionnaires, Spanish–American War veterans, and miscellaneous veterans along the north and south fence lines. Among the 9,000 burials are pioneer families such as the Burdines, Peacocks, and Dr. James Jackson. This site has the only known five oolitic (limestone) gravestones worldwide. Unique tropical plants make it a tropical oasis.

The Miami City Cemetery is one of the few cemeteries where the owners of the plot actually hold its deed. Approximately 1,000 open plots remain within the cemetery, but there are strict criteria for burial. A decedent must be either the deedholder or able to prove familial relationship to the owner. Friends of the family are not allowed. Currently, ten to twenty burials occur every year.

In 1997 Enid Pinkney and Penny Lambeth began a restoration project of the cemetery. It has been a major transformation.

== Notable burials ==
- Mary Abbott (1857—1904) – Pioneer in Women's Olympic Competitions, Author
- Redmond B. Gautier Sr. (1877-1944) - Judge, 15th Mayor of the City of Miami
- Julia Tuttle (1848–1898) – The "Mother of Miami."
- John Sewell (1867–1938) – 3rd Mayor of the City of Miami.
- John W. Watson (1859-1942) - Legislator, 6th and 8th Mayor of the City of Miami.
- Ben C Willard (1890-1963) - Judge, State Representative

== Gallery ==
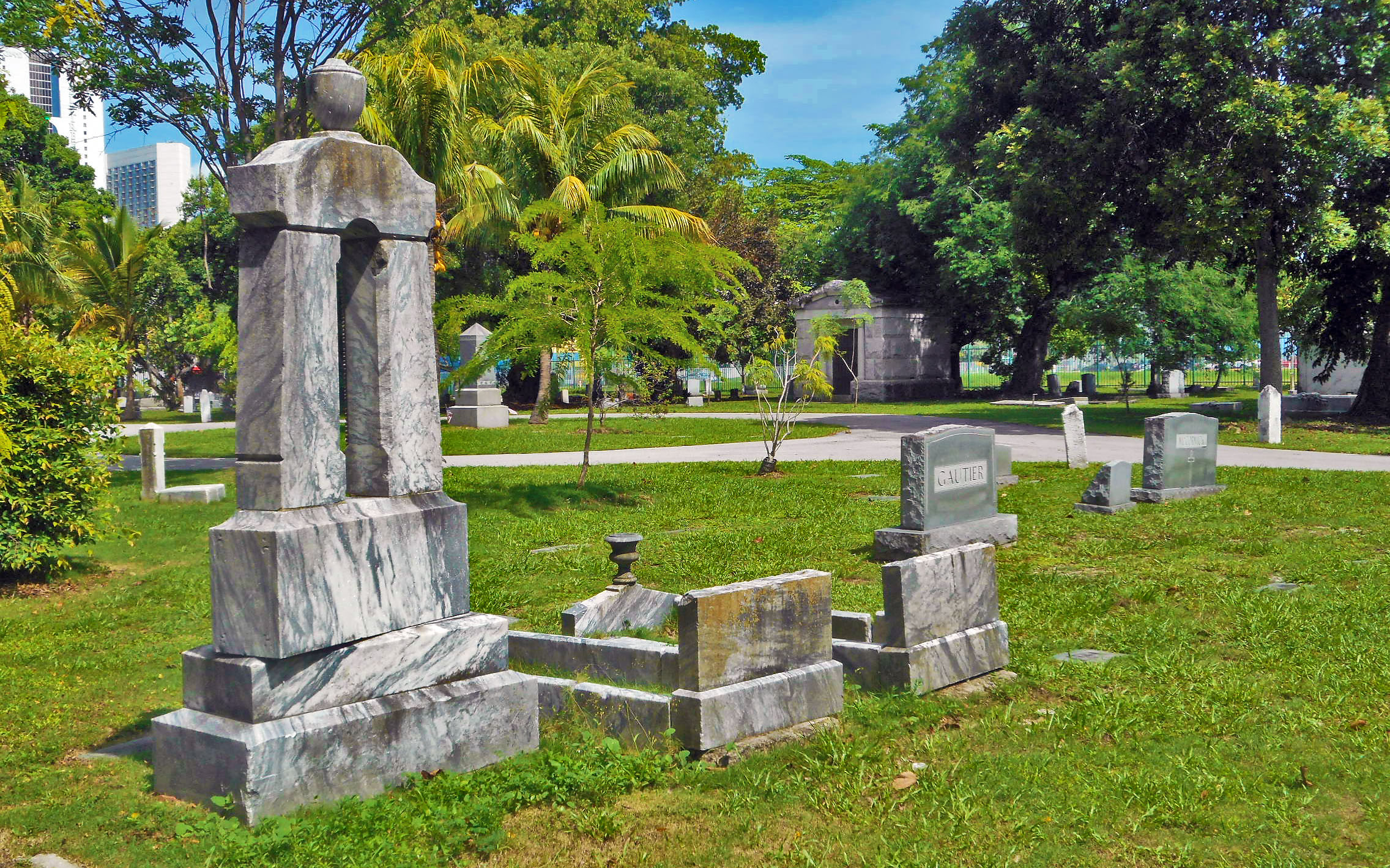
Gravesites and memorials

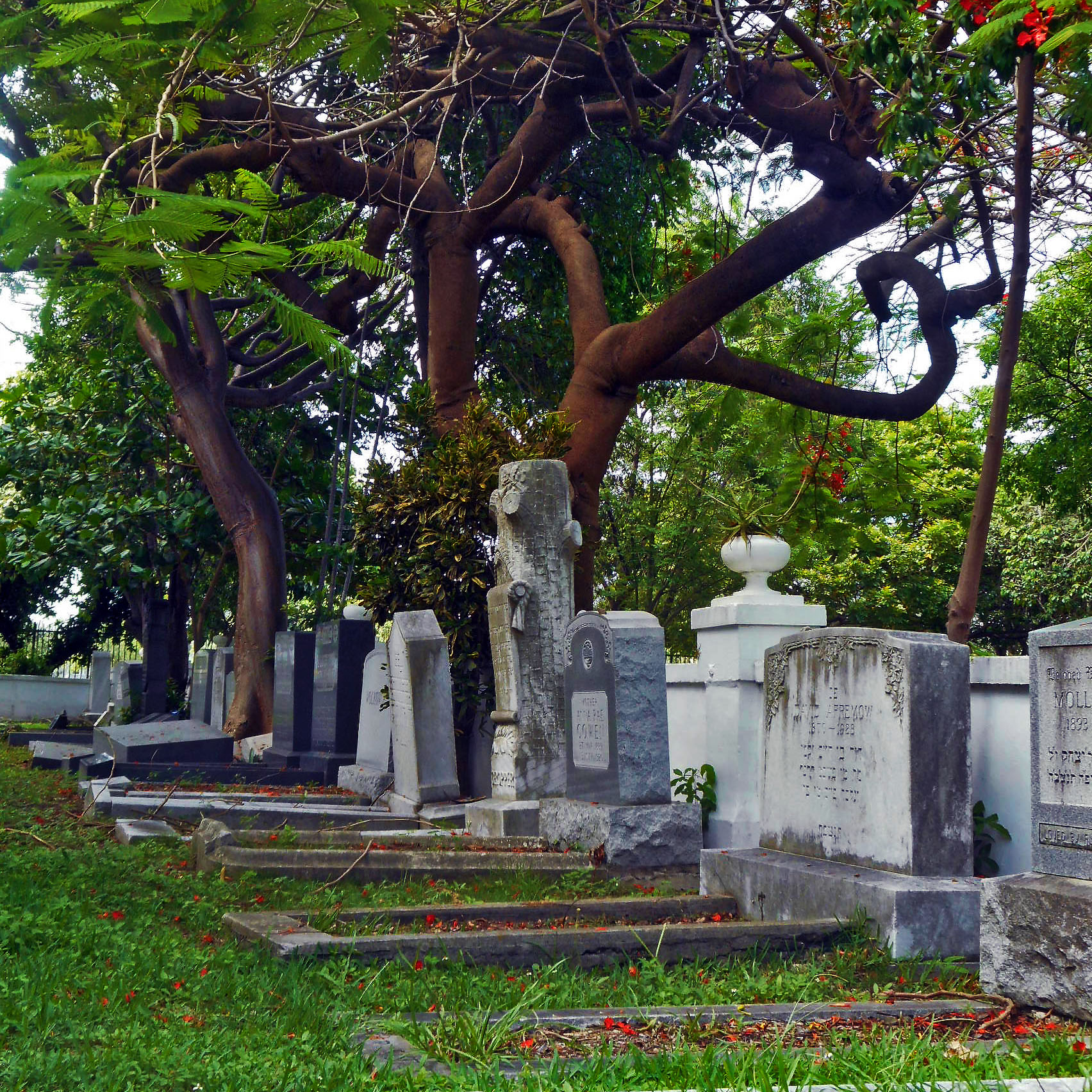
Jewish section

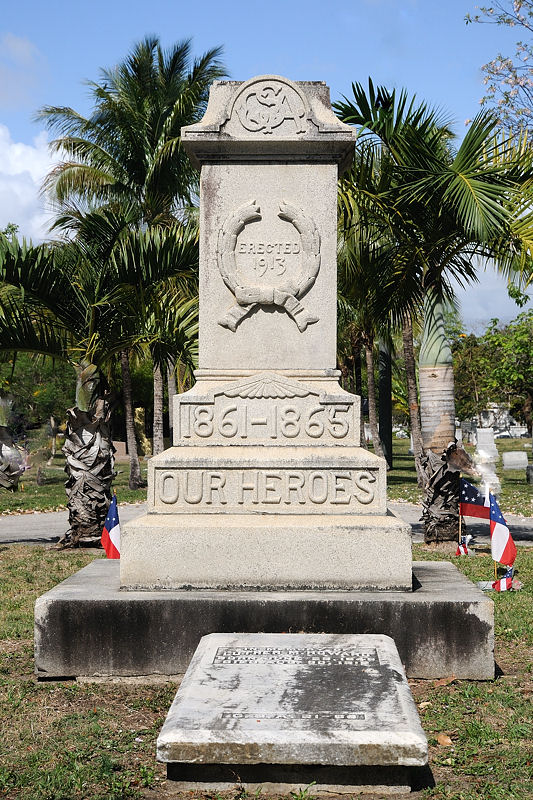
Confederate memorial

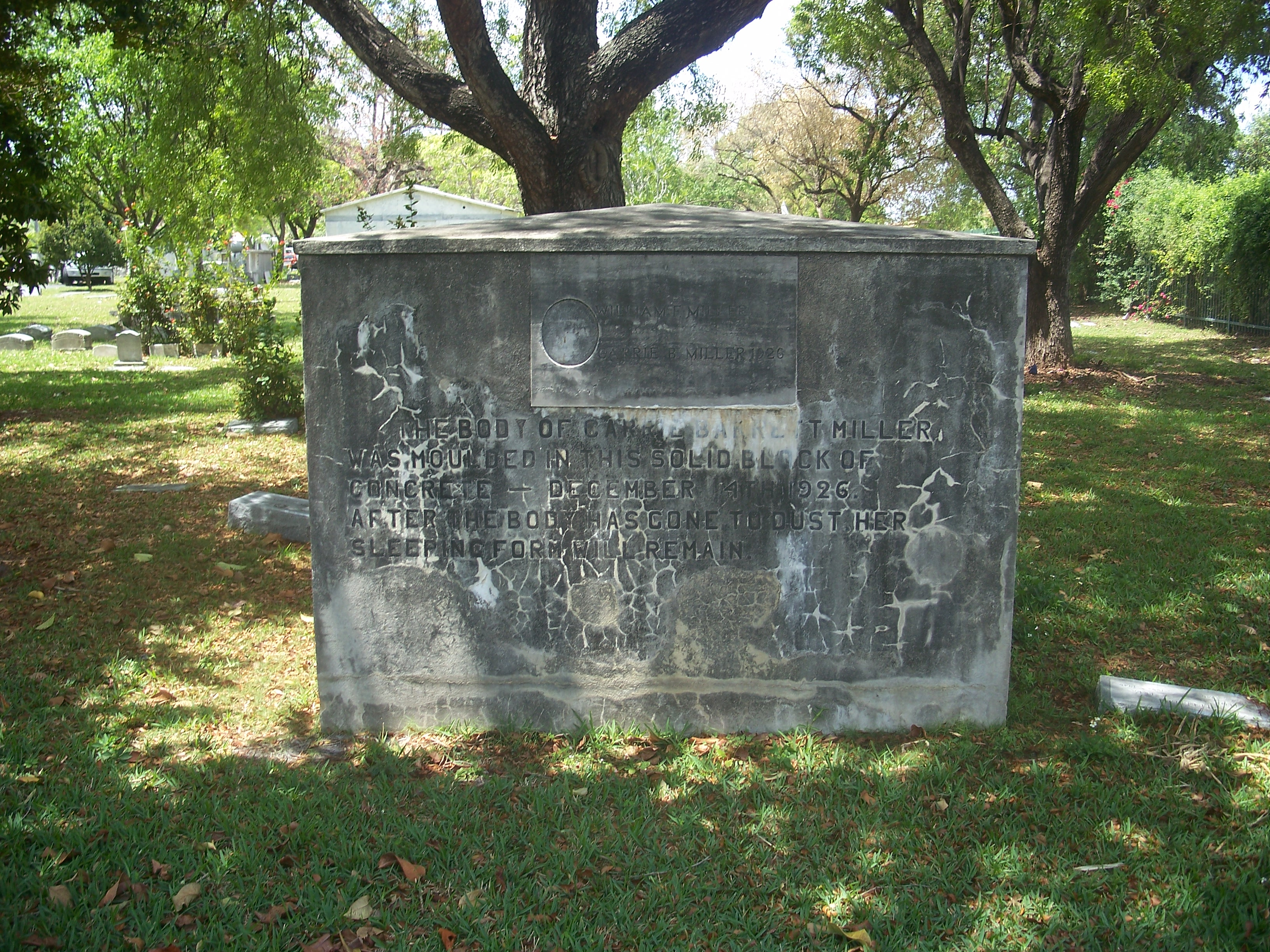
Concrete burial

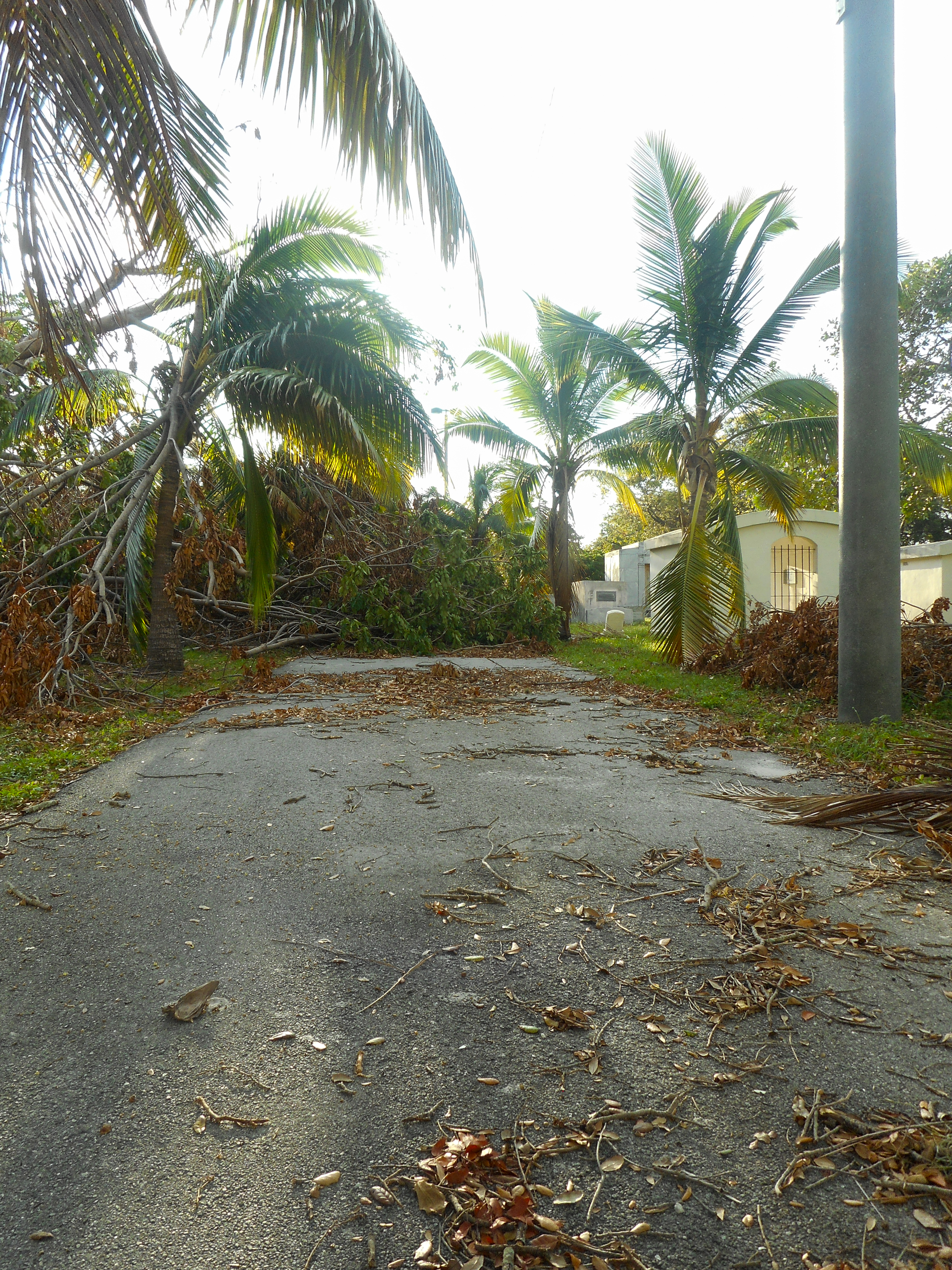
Hurricane Irma damage

== See also ==
- Downtown Miami Historic District
- National Register of Historic Places listings in Miami, Florida
