= 2009 Hialeah mayoral election =

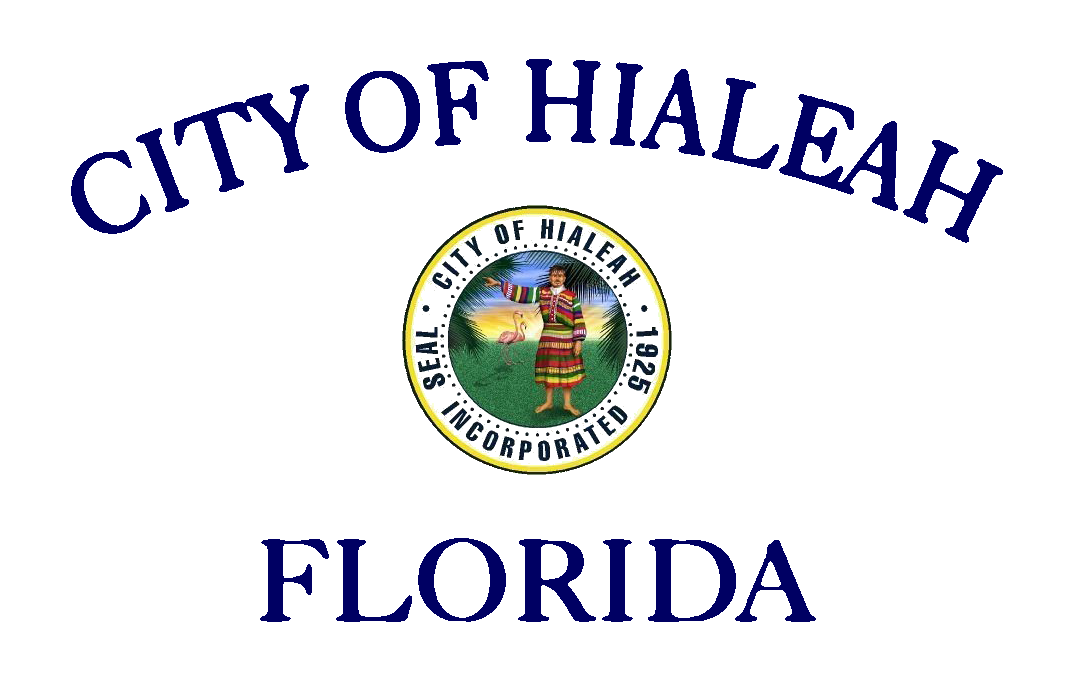
- November 15, 2009
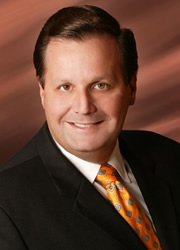

Candidate	Julio Robaina	Santiago A. Cardenas
Party	Nonpartisan	Nonpartisan
Popular vote	20,188	1,439
Percentage	93.35%	6.65%
Mayor before election
Julio Robaina
Nonpartisan
Elected mayor
Julio Robaina
Nonpartisan

The 2009 Hialeah mayoral election took place on November 15, 2009. Incumbent Mayor Julio Robaina ran for re-election to a second term. Unlike the 2005 election, Robaina faced only one little-known challenger, physician Santiago Cardenas. Robaina significantly outraised and outspent Cardenas, and won the endorsement of the Miami Herald, which praised him for "set[ting] a steady course that has kept Hialeah's budget in the black." Robaina ultimately won re-election in a landslide, winning 93 percent of the vote to Cardenas's 7 percent.

Robaina did not ultimately end up serving a full term. He resigned to unsuccessfully run for Mayor of Miami-Dade County in 2011, triggering a special election.

== General election ==
=== Candidates ===
- Julio Robaina, incumbent Mayor
- Santiago A. Cardenas, physician

=== Results ===
2009 Hialeah mayoral election results
Party	Candidate	Votes	%
Nonpartisan	Julio Robaina (inc.)	20,188	93.35%
Nonpartisan	Santiago A. Cardenas	1,439	6.65%
Total votes		21,627	100.00%
