= 2021 Hialeah mayoral election =

2021 mayoral election in Florida

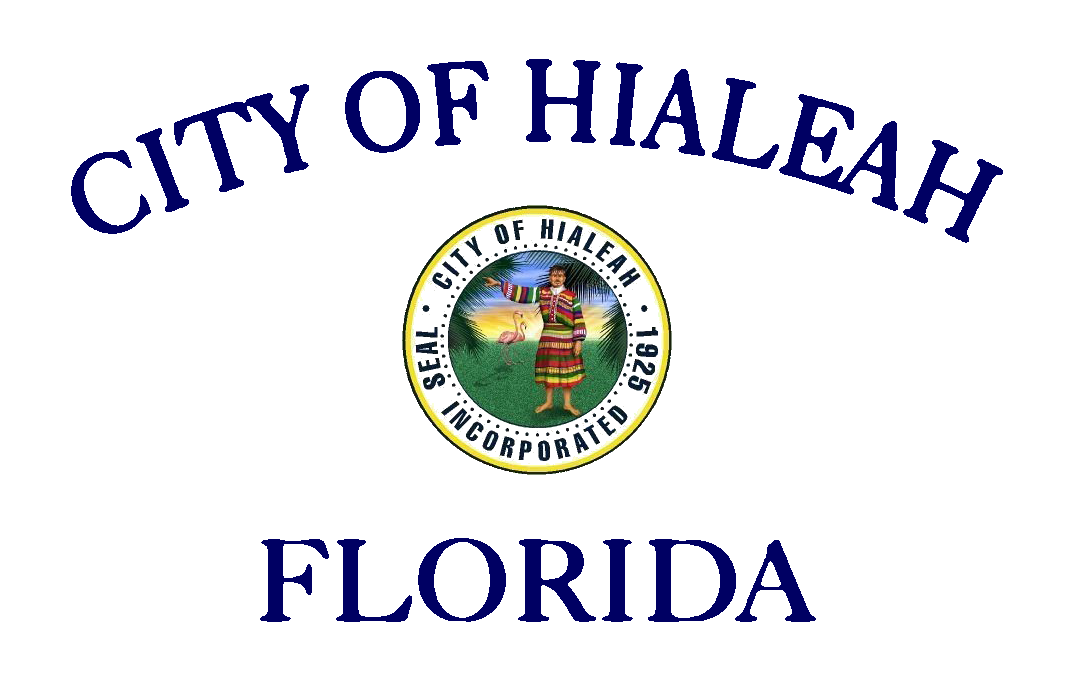
- November 2, 2021
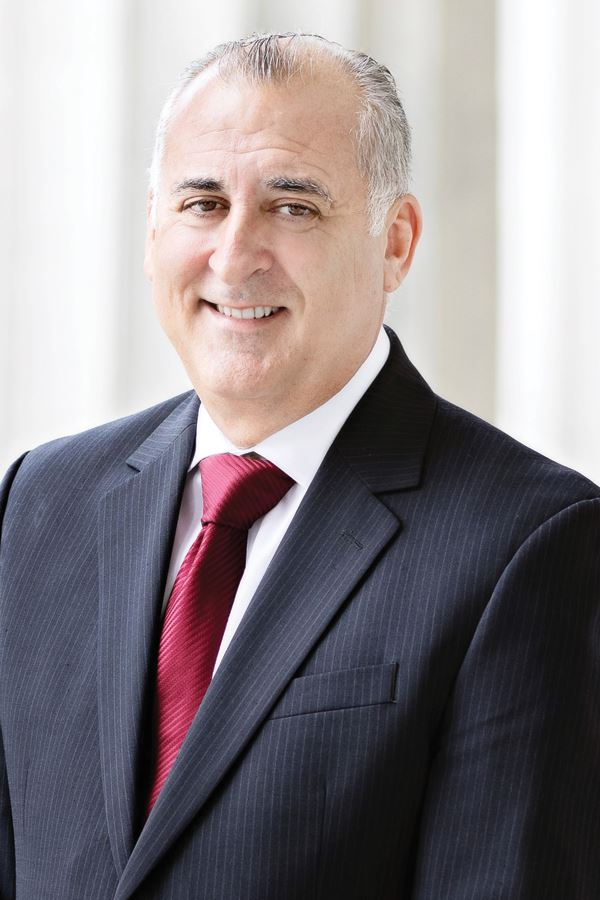

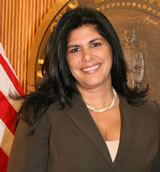

| Candidate | Esteban Bovo | Isis Garcia-Martinez | Fernando Godo |
| Party | Nonpartisan | Nonpartisan | Nonpartisan |
| Popular vote | 13,060 | 4,787 | 3,642 |
| Percentage | 58.95% | 21.61% | 16.44% |
Mayor before election
Carlos Hernández
Nonpartisan
Elected mayor
Esteban Bovo
Nonpartisan

The 2021 Hialeah mayoral election took place on November 7, 2021. Incumbent Mayor Carlos Hernández was term-limited and unable to run for re-election to a third term. Five candidates ran to succeed him, with former County Commissioner Esteban Bovo and former City Councilmember Isis Garcia-Martinez emerging as the frontrunners. During the campaign, Bovo was endorsed by former President Donald Trump, who remained popular in the city.

Bovo ultimately won the election by a wide margin, winning 59 percent of the vote and avoiding a runoff election, while Garcia-Martinez placed a distant second with 22 percent.

Bovo did not end up serving out his full term, however. He resigned on April 27, 2025, to join a lobbying firm in Washington, D.C.

== General election ==
=== Candidates ===
- Esteban Bovo, former County Commissioner, former State Representative, 2020 candidate for Mayor of Miami-Dade County
- Isis Garcia-Martinez, former City Councilmember
- Fernando Godo, activist
- Julio Martínez, former interim Mayor, 2013 candidate for Mayor
- Juan Santana, perennial candidate

=== Results ===
2021 Hialeah mayoral election results
| Party | Candidate | Votes | % |
|---|---|---|---|
| Nonpartisan | Esteban Bovo | 13,060 | 58.95% |
| Nonpartisan | Isis Garcia-Martinez | 4,787 | 21.61% |
| Nonpartisan | Fernando Godo | 3,642 | 16.44% |
| Nonpartisan | Julio Martínez | 423 | 1.91% |
| Nonpartisan | Juan Santana | 243 | 1.10% |
| Total votes | | 22,155 | 100.00% |
