= 2005 Hialeah mayoral election =

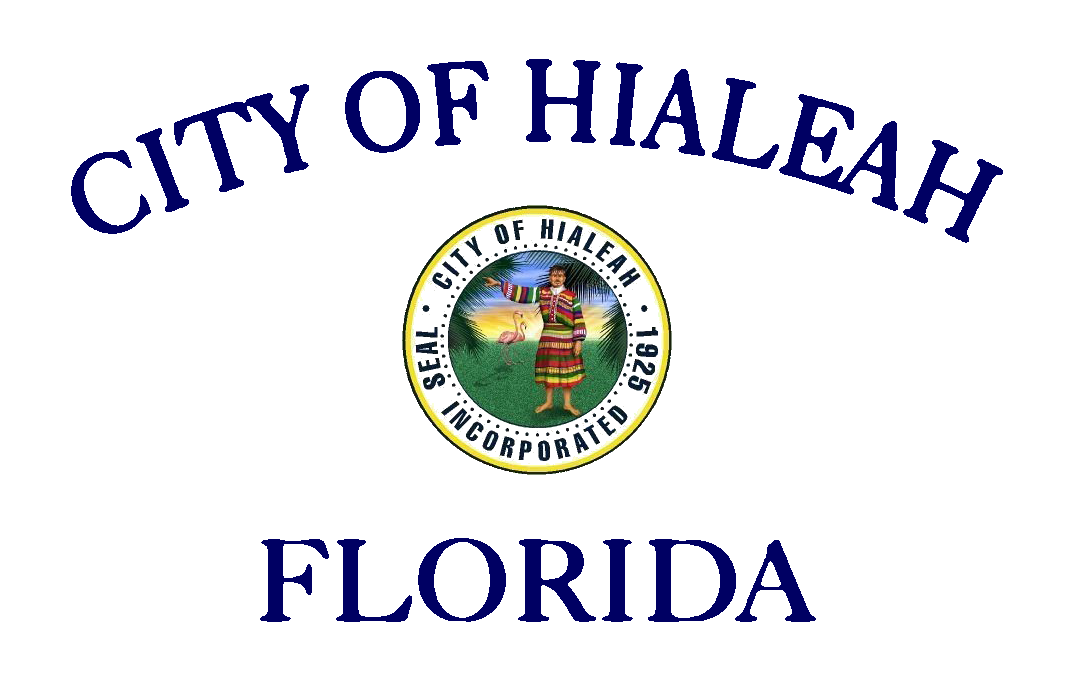
- November 15, 2005
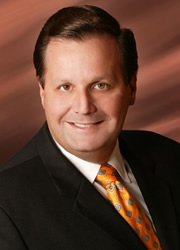

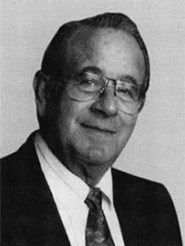

Candidate	Julio Robaina	Roberto Casas	Nilo Juri
Party	Nonpartisan	Nonpartisan	Nonpartisan
Popular vote	13,886	5,828	2,727
Percentage	59.77%	25.09%	11.74%
Mayor before election
Raúl L. Martínez
Nonpartisan
Elected mayor
Julio Robaina
Nonpartisan

The 2005 Hialeah mayoral election took place on November 15, 2005. Incumbent Raúl L. Martínez declined to seek re-election. Six candidates ran to succeed him, including City Council President Julio Robaina, City Councilman Roberto Casas, and perennial candidate Nilo Juri.

Robaina and Casas emerged as the leading candidates. Robaina significantly outraised and outspent the field, and was endorsed by Martínez as his successor. The Miami Herald endorsed Casas as an "elder statesman" who "honed his political skills" and "works quietly, listening and building consensus," whom it endorsed as "an ideal mayor for Hialeah's transitional period." Though the race was formally nonpartisan, Robaina and Casas sent out mailers that advertised themselves as Republicans, running afoul of a state law that prohibited partisan affiliation in nonpartisan elections.

Ultimately, Robaina won the election by a wide margin and avoided the need for a runoff, winning 60 percent of the vote to Casas's 25 percent and Juri's 12 percent.

== Primary election ==
=== Candidates ===
- Julio Robaina, City Council President
- Roberto Casas, City Councilman, former State Senator
- Nilo Juri, perennial candidate
- Santiago A. Cardenas, physician
- Phil Secada, former Chairman of the Hialeah Personnel Board
- Vicente Pedro Rodriguez, President of the Hialeah Hispanic Chamber of Commerce, editor of La Coz de la Calle

=== Results ===
2005 Hialeah mayoral election results
Party	Candidate	Votes	%
Nonpartisan	Julio Robaina	13,886	59.77%
Nonpartisan	Roberto Casas	5,828	25.09%
Nonpartisan	Nilo Juri	2,727	11.74%
Nonpartisan	Santiago A. Cardenas	481	2.07%
Nonpartisan	Phil Secada	175	0.75%
Nonpartisan	Vicente Pedro Rodriguez	124	0.53%
Nonpartisan	Write-ins	12	0.05%
Total votes		23,233	100.00%
