= 2020 Miami-Dade County mayoral election =

- August 18, 2020 (first round); November 3, 2020 (runoff); Officially nonpartisan
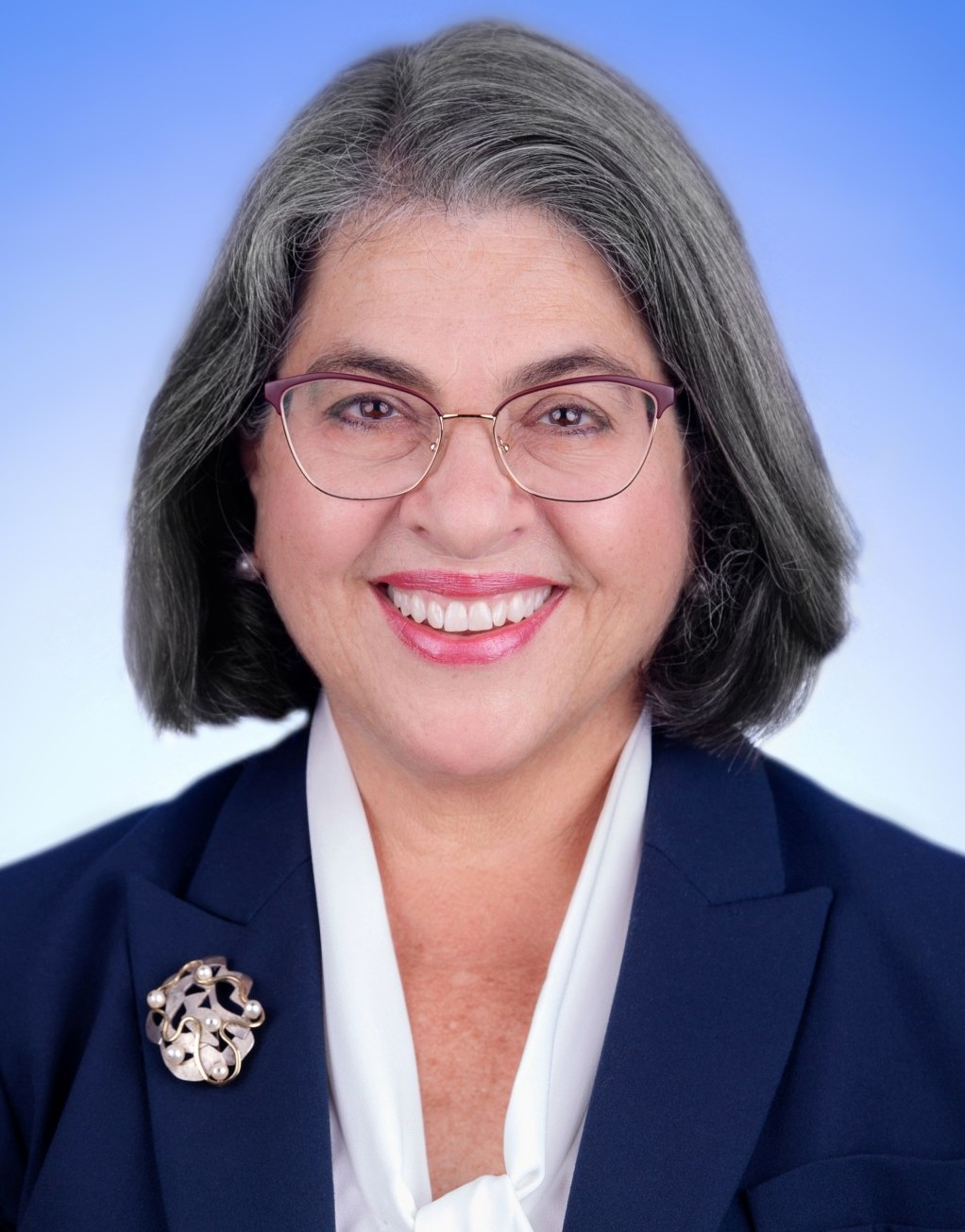

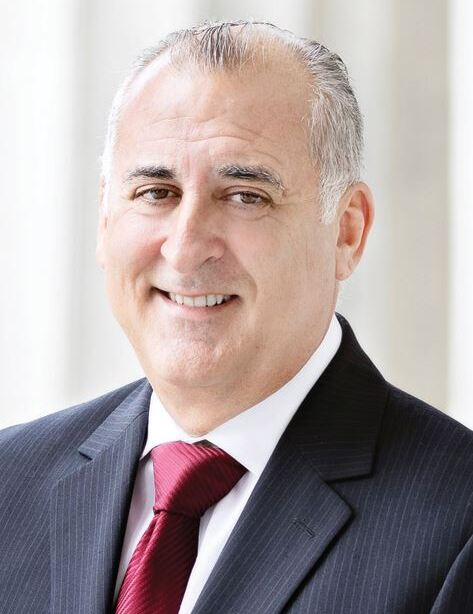

Candidate	Daniella Levine Cava	Esteban Bovo	Alex Penelas
Party	Democratic	Republican	Democratic
First round	120,089; 28.8%	122,135; 29.3%	102,338; 24.5%
Runoff	576,647; 54.0%	491,838; 46.0%	Eliminated
Candidate	Xavier Suarez	Monique Nicole Barley
Party	Republican	Democratic
First round	43,831; 10.5%	22,823; 5.5%
Runoff	Eliminated	Eliminated
- Second round results by precinct Levine Cava: 50–60% 60–70% 70–80% 80–90% >90% Bovo: 50–60% 60–70% 70–80% 80–90% >90% Tie: 50% No data
Mayor before election
Carlos A. Giménez
Republican
Elected mayor
Daniella Levine Cava
Democratic

The 2020 Miami-Dade County mayoral election was held on November 3, 2020, to determine the mayor of Miami-Dade County, Florida. County Commissioner Daniella Levine Cava defeated fellow commissioner Esteban Bovo. Incumbent Mayor Carlos A. Giménez, first elected in 2011, was term-limited; instead running for the U.S. House of Representatives to represent Florida's 26th congressional district.

The election was officially non-partisan. A top-two primary election for this office was held on August 18, 2020, with county commissioners Esteban Bovo and Daniella Levine Cava advancing to a runoff election scheduled for November 3, 2020.

== Candidates ==
=== Advanced to run-off ===
- Esteban Bovo, Miami-Dade County commissioner (Republican)
- Daniella Levine Cava, Miami-Dade County commissioner (Democratic)

=== Eliminated in primary ===
- Monique Nicole Barley, businesswoman and daughter of former State Representative Roy Hardemon (Democratic)
- Carlos de Armas, businessman and Uber driver (independent, write-in)
- Ludmilla Domond, real estate agent (Republican)
- Alex Penelas, former mayor of Miami-Dade County (Democratic)
- Xavier Suarez, Miami-Dade County commissioner and former mayor of Miami (Independent)

=== Withdrawn ===
- Robert Ingram Burke, candidate for mayor of Miami in 2017 (Independent)
- Jean Monestime, Miami-Dade County commissioner (Democratic)
- Juan Zapata, Miami-Dade County commissioner (Republican)

=== Declined ===
- Luther Campbell, rapper and candidate for mayor of Miami-Dade County in 2011 (Democratic)
- Carlos Curbelo, former United States representative (Republican)
- Carlos Lopez-Cantera, former Lieutenant Governor of Florida (Republican)
- Bernie Navarro, former president of the Latin Builders Association (Republican)

== Primary election ==
=== Endorsements ===
Esteban Bovo

U.S. senators

- Marco Rubio, U.S. Senator from Florida

U.S. representatives

- Mario Diaz Balart, U.S. Representative from Florida's 25th congressional district
- Matt Gaetz, U.S. Representative from Florida's 1st congressional district

Statewide officials

- Jeanette Nuñez, Lieutenant Governor of Florida
- Carlos Lopez-Cantera, former Lieutenant Governor of Florida

State representatives

- Daniel Perez, district 116

County officials

- Jose Pepe Diaz, Miami-Dade County commissioner
- Carlos A. Giménez, mayor of Miami-Dade County
- Xavier Suarez, former challenger, current Miami-Dade County commissioner and former mayor of the City of Miami
- Rebeca Sosa, Miami-Dade County commissioner
- Javier Souto, Miami-Dade County commissioner

Municipal officials

- Manny Cid, mayor of Miami Lakes
- Yioset De La Cruz, mayor of Hialeah Gardens
- Zavier Garcia, former mayor of Miami Springs
- Julio Robaina, former mayor of Hialeah

Organizations

- Miami Young Republicans
- Miami Dade College Republicans
- FIU College Republicans
- Police Benevolent Association of South Florida

Individuals

- Monique Nicole Barley, former challenger, businesswoman and daughter of former State Representative Roy Hardemon (Democratic)
- Ludmilla Domond, former challenger, real estate agent (Republican)
Daniella Levine Cava

Executive officials

- Hillary Clinton, 67th United States Secretary of State (2009–2013), U.S. Senator from New York (2001–2009), First Lady of the United States (1993–2001), 2016 Democratic nominee for president of the United States

U.S. Senators

- Bill Nelson, former senator from Florida (2001–2019)

U.S. Representatives

- Debbie Mucarsel-Powell, U.S. Representative from Florida's 26th congressional district
- Donna Shalala, U.S. Representative from Florida's 27th congressional district
- Debbie Wasserman Schultz, U.S. Representative from Florida's 23rd congressional district

Statewide officials

- Alex Sink, former Chief Financial Officer of Florida and 2010 gubernatorial nominee
- Nikki Fried, Florida Commissioner of Agriculture

State senators

- José Javier Rodríguez, district 37
- Oscar Braynon, district 35
- Annette Taddeo, district 40

State representatives

- Nicholas Duran, district 112

County officials

- Manny Diaz, former mayor of Miami (2001–2009)
- Jean Monestime, Miami-Dade County Commissioner and former mayoral candidate.

Individuals

- Donald Sussman, hedge-fund executive
- Chris King, businessman and 2018 nominee for lieutenant governor

Organizations

- Sierra Club
Alex Penelas

County officials

- Barbara Jordan, Miami-Dade County commissioner

Municipal officials

- Bill Kerdyck Jr., former vice mayor of Coral Gables
- Philip Levine, former mayor of Miami Beach
Xavier Suarez (I)

Municipal officials

- Francis Suarez, mayor of Miami (his son)

=== Polling ===
Poll source	Date(s) administered	Sample size (Note: Key: A – all adults RV – registered voters LV – likely voters V – unclear)	Margin of error	Daniella Levine Cava	Alex Penelas	Esteban Bovo	Xavier Suarez	Other	Undecided
Change Research (D)	April 30 – May 3, 2020	487 (RV)	± 4.4%	22%	20%	14%	11%	10%	23%
Dynamic Research/Daniella Levine Cava (Note: Poll sponsored by Cava's campaign.)	July 20–23, 2020	457 (RV)	± 4.9%	26%	22%	22%	15%	2%	13%
Unnamed independent pollster/Political Cortadito	July 30 – August 3, 2020	400 (V)	–	20%	15%	19%	10%	–	–
Change Research (D)/Daniella Levine Cava	August 3–6, 2020	473 (LV)	± 4.5%	25%	20%	21%	9%	4%	22%
Frederick Polls/Alex Penelas (Note: Poll sponsored by Penelas' campaign.)	August 7–9, 2020	350 (LV)	± 5%	22%	27%	20%	11%	6% (Note: Barley, De Armas and Domond with 2%)	16%
National Victory Strategies/P3 Management	August 12–13, 2020	200 (LV)	± 5%	18%	18%	21%	9%	–	26%

=== Results ===
Non-partisan blanket primary results
Candidate	Votes	%
Esteban Bovo	122,135	29.28
Daniella Levine Cava	120,089	28.79
Alex Penelas	102,338	24.53
Xavier Suarez	43,831	10.51
Monique Nicole Barley	22,823	5.47
Ludmilla Domond	5,230	1.25
Write-in	715	0.17
Total votes	417,161	100.00

== General election ==
=== Polling ===
Poll source	Date(s) administered	Sample size	Margin of error	Daniella Levine Cava	Esteban Bovo	Undecided
Change Research (D)/Daniella Levine Cava	August 3–6, 2020	– (V) (Note: Not yet released)	–	39%	28%	33%
Bendixen and Amandi/Miami Herald	September 1–4, 2020	500 (LV)	± 4.5%	39%	32%	29%
Change Research (D)/Daniella Levine Cava	September 14–17, 2020	436 (V)	± 4.7%	45%	32%	13%
Amandi On Air/Miami Herald	October 1–4, 2020	600 (V)	–	45%	35%	–
SEA Research/Daniella Levine Cava	October 20–22, 2020	407 (LV)	± 5.3%	45%	30%	25%

=== Debate ===
2020 Miami-Dade County mayoral election debate
No.	Date	Host	Moderator	Link	Nonpartisan	Nonpartisan
Key: P Participant A Absent N Not invited I Invited W Withdrawn						
Key: P Participant A Absent N Not invited I Invited W Withdrawn					Esteban Bovo	Daniella Levine Cava
1	Oct. 18, 2020	WFOR-TV	Jim DeFede	YouTube	P	P

=== Results ===
2020 Miami-Dade County mayoral election
Candidate	Votes	%
Daniella Levine Cava	576,647	53.97
Esteban Bovo	491,838	46.03
Total votes	1,068,485	100.00

== Notes ==
Partisan clients
