= 2017 Hialeah mayoral election =

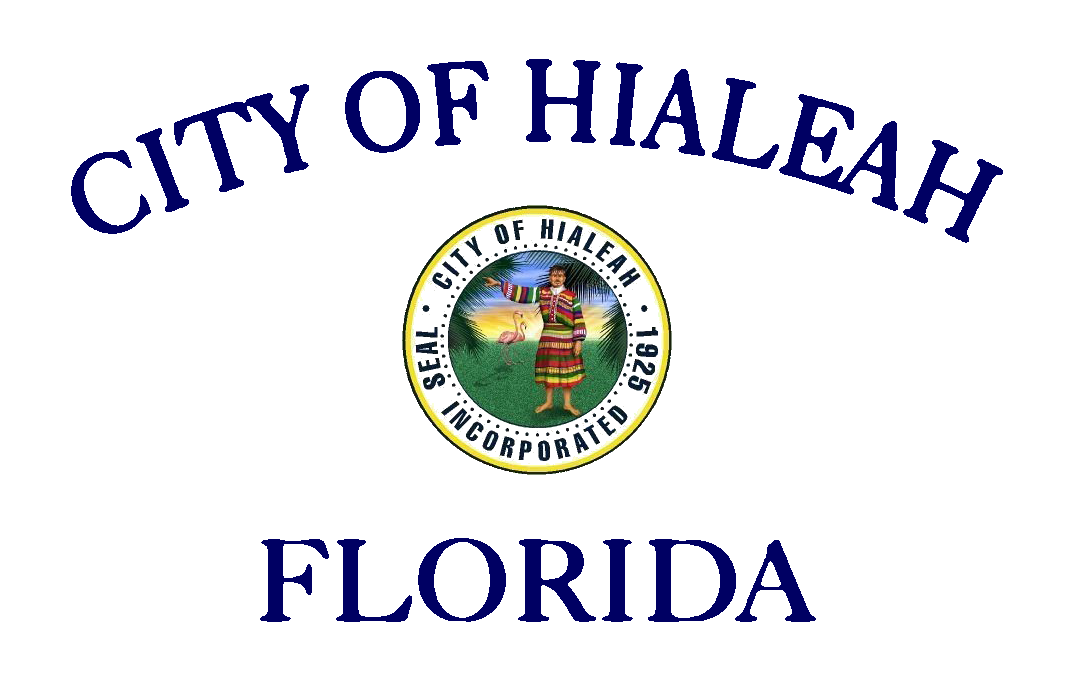
- November 7, 2017
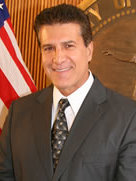

Candidate	Carlos Hernández	Tania García
Party	Nonpartisan	Nonpartisan
Popular vote	11,636	2,307
Percentage	81.21%	15.62%
Mayor before election
Carlos Hernández
Nonpartisan
Elected mayor
Carlos Hernández
Nonpartisan

The 2017 Hialeah mayoral election took place on November 7, 2017. Incumbent Mayor Carlos Hernández ran for re-election to a second full term. Former interim Mayor Julio Martínez, one of Hernández's opponents in 2013, challenged Hernández's eligibility to run, arguing that the city charter's term limits counted the partial term he served from 2011 to 2013 as a full term. Martínez's lawsuit was ultimately dismissed, and Hernández ran for re-election.

Hernández faced two opponents: businesswoman Tania García and activist Juan Santana. García argued that Hernández governed with "fear" and that she "want[ed] Hialeah to return to its best time, clean streets, children playing in the parks, when the workers of the city were the residents themselves." Santana campaigned on cutting taxes for elderly residents and new businesses and making wireless internet free throughout the area, and campaigned with a "Make Hialeah Great Again" hat.

During the campaign, Hernández weathered controversy over ethical violations. A public corruption investigation conducted by the State Attorney's office revealed that allocated for food assistance for poor children were instead spent on a parks and recreation conference in Las Vegas,

Hernández was ultimately re-elected in a landslide, receiving 79 percent of the vote to García's 16 percent and Santana's 6 percent.

== General election ==
=== Candidates ===
- Carlos Hernández incumbent Mayor
- Tania García, businesswoman, real estate agent, 2015 candidate for City Council
- Juan Santana, political activist, 2013 candidate for Mayor

=== Results ===
2017 Hialeah mayoral election results
Party	Candidate	Votes	%
Nonpartisan	Carlos Hernández (inc.)	11,636	78.80%
Nonpartisan	Tania García	2,307	15.62%
Nonpartisan	Juan Santana	823	5.57%
Total votes		14,766	100.00%
