= 2012 Miami-Dade County mayoral election =

- August 14, 2012
- Turnout: 20.0% ▲
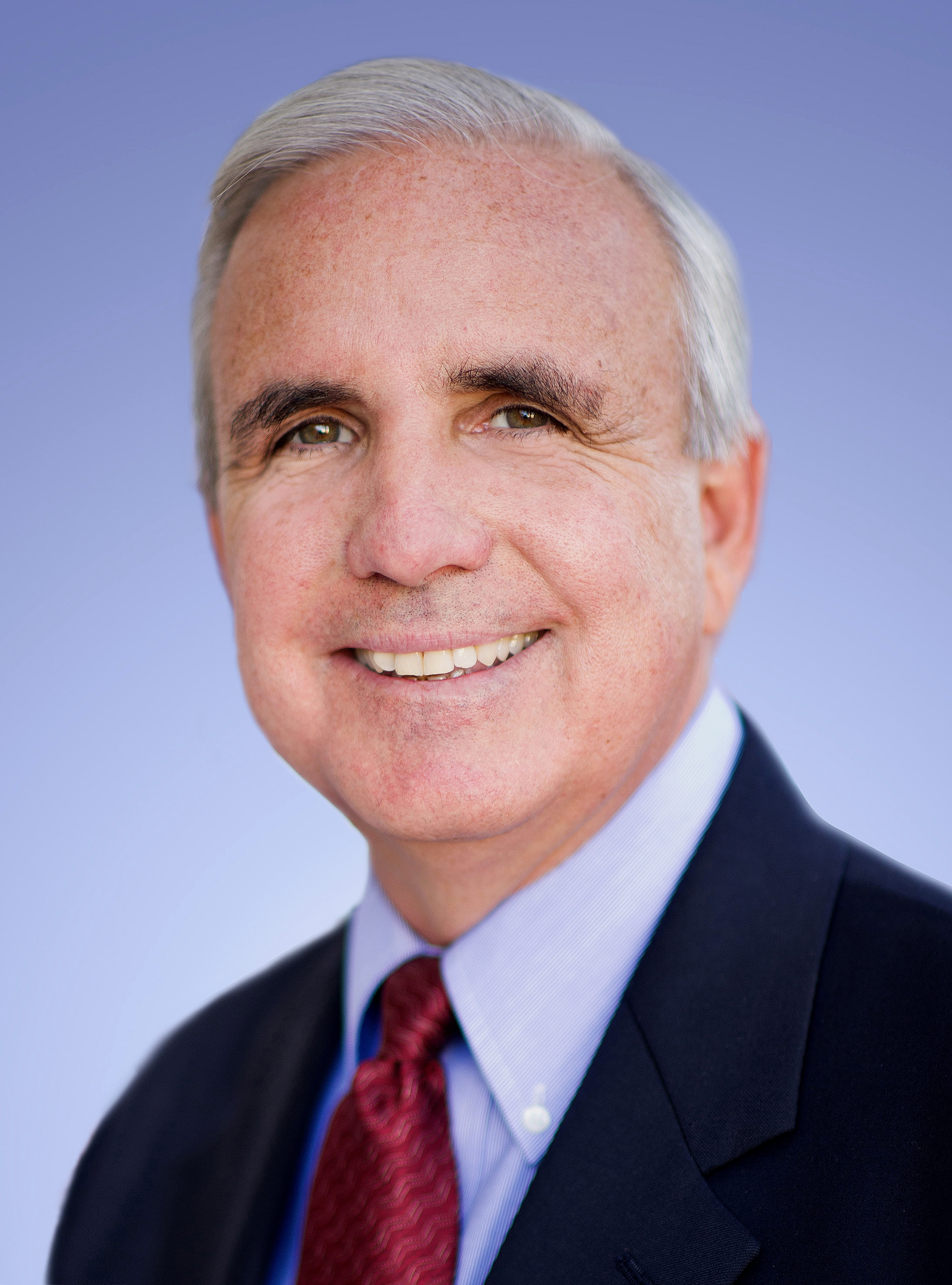

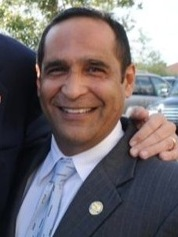

Candidate	Carlos A. Giménez	Joe Martinez	Helen B. Williams
Popular vote	126,525	71,814	14,754
Percentage	54.2%	30.8%	6.3%
Mayor before election
Carlos A. Giménez
Republican
Elected mayor
Carlos A. Giménez
Republican

The 2012 Miami-Dade County mayoral election took place on August 14, 2012. Incumbent Mayor Carlos A. Giménez defeated County Commissioner Joe Martinez with over 50% of the vote, avoiding a November 6 runoff. The election was officially nonpartisan.

== Candidates ==
- Edna Diaz, (Independent)
- Carlos A. Giménez, incumbent mayor of Miami-Dade County (Republican)
- Gary Delano Johnson, (Democratic)
- Farid Khavari, economist and gubernatorial candidate in 2010 (Democratic)
- Joe Martinez, Miami-Dade County commissioner (Republican)
- Helen B. Williams, Miami-Dade County Public Schools administrator (Independent) 2008 candidate for Mayor
- Denny Wood, activist (Independent)

== Results ==
2012 Miami-Dade County mayoral election
Candidate	Votes	%
Carlos A. Giménez (incumbent)	126,525	54.23
Joe Martinez	71,814	30.78
Helen B. Williams	14,754	6.32
Denny Wood	6,900	2.96
Gary Delano Johnson	5,759	2.47
Edna Diaz	5,589	2.40
Farid Khavari	1,978	0.85
Total votes	233,319	100.00
