= 2013 Hialeah mayoral election =

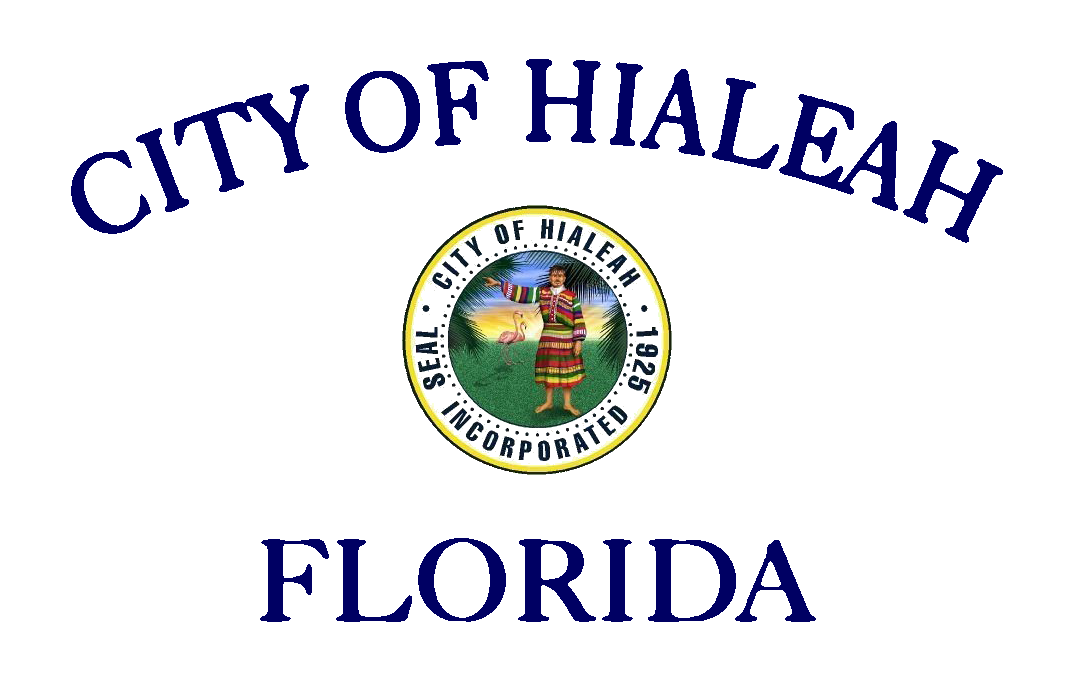
- November 5, 2013
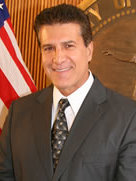

Candidate	Carlos Hernández	Julio Martínez
Party	Nonpartisan	Nonpartisan
Popular vote	14,826	2,864
Percentage	81.21%	15.69%
Mayor before election
Carlos Hernández
Nonpartisan
Elected mayor
Carlos Hernández
Nonpartisan

The 2013 Hialeah mayoral election took place on November 5, 2013. Incumbent Mayor Carlos Hernández, who became Mayor in 2011 upon the resignation of former Mayor Julio Robaina and was re-elected in a 2011 special election, ran for re-election to a full term. Though former Mayor Raúl Martínez initially filed to run, he ultimately declined to challenge Hernández.

Hernández faced two opponents: Julio Martínez, who acted as interim Mayor in the 1990s while Raúl Martínez was suspended from office, and businessman Juan Santana. During the campaign, Martínez accused Hernández and the City Council of conducting a secret meeting prior to a public budget hearing, but the State Attorney and county Ethics Commission concluded that no such violation occurred. Hernández, in turn, accused Martínez of "creat[ing] a false impression" as an election tactic.

The Miami Herald offered a tepid endorsement of Hernández, noting that he "has made tough but correct decisions" and "understands the issues affecting his city, but his style of governance leaves much to be desired." The Herald observed that at City Council meetings, "his loyal slate of political allies rarely challenges him and naysayers are generally ignored," while citizens "who dare to express criticism are often treated curtly, if not rudely."

Hernández was ultimately re-elected in a landslide, receiving 81 percent of the vote to Martínez's 16 percent and Santana's 3 percent.

== General election ==
=== Candidates ===
- Carlos Hernández incumbent Mayor
- Julio Martínez, former interim Mayor
- Juan Santana, businessman

==== Declined ====
- Raúl Martínez, former Mayor

=== Results ===
2013 Hialeah mayoral election results
Party	Candidate	Votes	%
Nonpartisan	Carlos Hernández (inc.)	14,826	81.21%
Nonpartisan	Julio Martínez	2,864	15.69%
Nonpartisan	Juan Santana	566	3.10%
Total votes		18,256	100.00%
