= Daniella Levine Cava =

American lawyer and politician

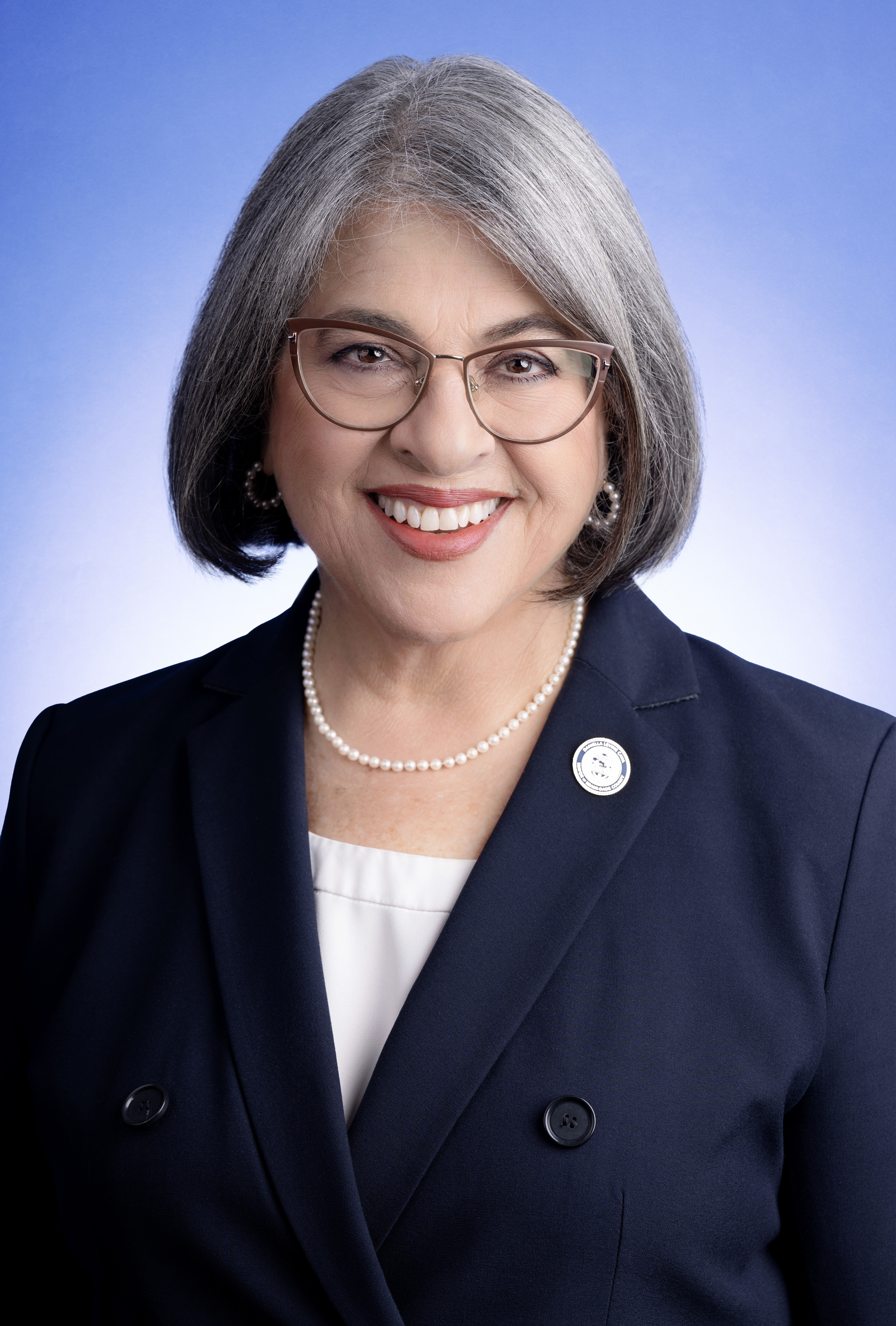
- Official portrait, 2024

8th Mayor of Miami-Dade County
- Incumbent
- Assumed office November 17, 2020
- Preceded by: Carlos A. Giménez

Member of the Miami-Dade County Commission from the 8th district
- In office November 5, 2014 – November 17, 2020
- Preceded by: Lynda Bell
- Succeeded by: Danielle Cohen Higgins

Personal details
- Born: Daniella Levine; September 14, 1955 (age 70) New York City, New York, U.S.
- Party: Democratic
- Spouse: Robert Cava
- Children: 2
- Education: Yale University (BA); Columbia University (JD, MSW)

Daniella Levine Cava (/ləˈviːn ˈkɑːvə/ lə-VEEN KAH-və; born September 14, 1955) is an American lawyer, social worker, and politician who has served as the mayor of Miami-Dade County, Florida since 2020. Previously, she was a Miami-Dade County Commissioner from 2014 until her election as mayor in 2020. She was re-elected in 2024. She is the first woman to serve as mayor of Miami-Dade County.

== Early life and education ==
Daniella Levine was born on September 14, 1955, in New York City. She travelled throughout Latin America in her youth, including to Rio de Janeiro and Santiago. She later attended Yale University, where she served as the President of the Student Council, graduating in 1977 with a Bachelor of Arts in psychology. She later attended Columbia University, receiving a Juris Doctor in 1981 and a Master of Social Work in 1983. She moved to Miami in 1980 with her husband, Dr. Robert Cava.

== Legal and non-profit career ==
Upon her arrival to Miami in 1980, Levine Cava became an attorney with Legal Services of Greater Miami, later leaving in 1985 after becoming legal director for the Guardian Ad Litem program, a court-run child welfare legal program. During her time as a lawyer, she served on the Florida Bar Committee on Legal Needs of Children. In 1992, following Hurricane Andrew, she was appointed as the Miami-Dade County program manager for the Florida Department of Children and Families, holding the position until 1994. The following year, she founded a youth outreach program with Barry University.

In 1996, Levine Cava founded the Human Services Coalition, later renamed Catalyst Miami, which, through partnerships with the United Way and local businesses, aids low-income families with monetary advice. At Catalyst Miami, she launched the Prosperity Campaign which helps people increase their income and savings, allowing families to build financial security. She served as the president and chief executive officer of Catalyst Miami until 2013.

== Miami-Dade County commission ==
In 2013, Levine Cava, a Democrat, ran against incumbent Miami-Dade County District 8 Commissioner Lynda Bell, a Republican. The district includes much of southern Miami-Dade County, including suburban localities like West Kendall and Cutler Bay, and agricultural communities like Homestead and Redland. Levine Cava entered the race in 2014. Levine Cava narrowly defeated Bell in the August 26 election, receiving 52% of the vote to Bell's 48%.

In 2016, Levine Cava sponsored legislation in the Miami-Dade County Commission that requires local candidates for office to register when they raise money for political action committees.

Levine Cava won re-election in 2018, receiving over 61% of the vote.

In November 2019, Levine Cava published a letter in the Miami Herald criticizing the Florida State Legislature for diverting funds for affordable housing. This diverted nearly $1.4 billion to balance the state budget. She also created the Infill Housing Program which aims to build affordable housing on County-owned land in her district.

During her tenure, Levine Cava has advocated for the protection of the environment. In 2017, she sponsored the resolution to support the Paris climate agreement. In response to the presence of faecal bacteria in Biscayne Bay in early 2020, she also sponsored legislation to improve water testing in the area.

In 2018, Levine Cava created an initiative to protect pedestrians and bikers from harm's way. The initiative featured a plan for engaging with the business community to create incentives that could train people to be better drivers and an agenda for improving biking accessibility on roads.

Levine Cava gained endorsements from labor unions including the Service Employees International Union, and the AFL–CIO, and environmental groups like the Sierra Club.

== Mayor of Miami-Dade County ==
In early 2020, Levine Cava announced her run for the 2020 Miami-Dade County mayoral election, to succeed incumbent Mayor Carlos Giménez, who was term-limited. She earned the endorsements of many major organizations and newspapers, including the Miami Herald, and received the endorsement of many prominent Democrats, including congresswomen Debbie Mucarsel-Powell and Donna Shalala. Levine Cava has also received significant funding from Donald Sussman, a hedge fund executive who was the largest single donor to Hillary Clinton in the 2016 United States presidential election.

In the August 18 primary, Levine Cava placed second behind fellow Commissioner Esteban Bovo, receiving 28% to Bovo's 29%, with former County Mayor Alex Penelas trailing in third with 24%. Because neither Levine Cava or Bovo received over 50% of the vote, this triggered a runoff election between the two candidates, which was held on November 3, 2020. Levine Cava won the runoff election with 54% of the vote.

In late June, Levine Cava garnered national attention for her response to the Surfside condominium building collapse.

== Electoral history ==
Miami-Dade County Commission District 8 election, 2014
Party	Candidate	Votes	%
Democratic	Daniella Levine Cava	9,078	51.97
Republican	Lynda Bell (incumbent)	8,390	48.03
Total votes		17,468	100.00

Miami-Dade County Commission District 8 election, 2018
Party	Candidate	Votes	%
Democratic	Daniella Levine Cava (incumbent)	15,289	61.16
Republican	Gus Barreiro	5,431	21.73
Democratic	Johnathan Burke	4,278	17.11
Total votes		24,998	100.00

Miami-Dade County mayoral blanket primary, 2020
Party	Candidate	Votes	%
Republican	Esteban Bovo	122,135	29.28
Democratic	Daniella Levine Cava	120,089	28.79
Democratic	Alex Penelas	102,338	24.53
Independent	Xavier Suarez	43,831	10.51
Democratic	Monique Nicole Barley	22,823	5.47
Republican	Ludmilla Domond	5,230	1.25
Write-in		715	0.17
Total votes		417,161	100.00

Miami-Dade County mayoral election, 2020
Party	Candidate	Votes	%
Democratic	Daniella Levine Cava	576,647	53.97
Republican	Esteban Bovo	491,838	46.03
Total votes		1,068,485	100.00

Miami-Dade County mayoral election, 2024
Party	Candidate	Votes	%
Democratic	Daniella Levine Cava (incumbent)	163,597	57.93
Republican	Manny Cid	64,985	23.01
Republican	Alex Otaola	33,252	11.78
Republican	Carlos Garín	8,333	2.95
Republican	Shlomo Danziger	5,300	1.88
Independent	Eddy Rojas	3,608	1.28
Libertarian	Miguel Quintero	3,313	1.17
Total votes		282,388	100.00

== Personal life ==
Levine Cava is Jewish. She is married to Robert Cava, a Miami-Dade physician of Italian Jewish descent. They have two children, Eliza and Edward.

== Awards ==
For her non-profit work, Levine Cava has the Most Distinguished Pioneer Award from the National Alliance to Nurture the Aged and the Youth and the Joanne Hayes Democracy and Mentoring Award from the League of Women Voters.

== Notes ==
Political offices
Preceded by Carlos A. Giménez	Mayor of Miami-Dade County; 2020–present	Incumbent
