= 2011 Hialeah mayoral special election =

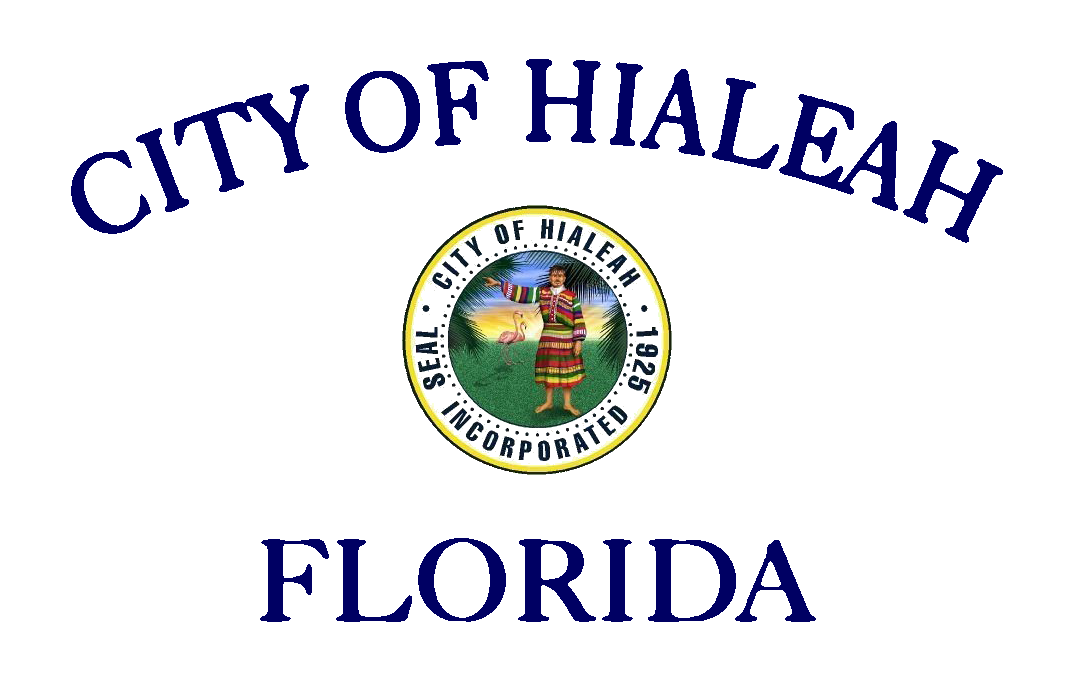
- November 1, 2011 (first round); November 15, 2011 (runoff)
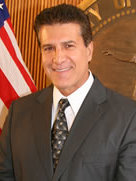

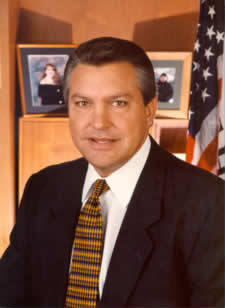

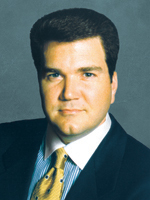
Candidate	Carlos Hernández	Raúl L. Martínez	Rudy García
First round	12,074; 39.53%	10,529; 34.47%	7,838; 25.66%
Runoff	19,055; 60.89%	12,239; 39.11%	Eliminated
Mayor before election
Carlos Hernández
Nonpartisan
Elected mayor
Carlos Hernández
Nonpartisan

The 2011 Hialeah mayoral special election took place on November 15, 2011, following a first round on November 1, 2011. Former Mayor Julio Robaina resigned so that he could run for Mayor of Miami-Dade County. Following Robaina's resignation, City Council President Carlos Hernández became Mayor. Hernández ran in the special election to serve out the remaining two years of Robaina's term. He was challenged by former Mayor Raúl L. Martínez and former State Senator Rudy García. Though the race was formally nonpartisan, Hernández and García were Republicans, and Martínez was a Democrat.

In the first-round election, Hernández placed first with 40 percent of the vote, followed by Martínez with 34 percent and García with 26 percent. Because no candidate received a majority of the vote, a runoff election took place two weeks later. At the runoff election, Hernández defeated Martínez in a landslide, winning 61 percent of the vote.

== Primary election ==
=== Candidates ===
- Carlos Hernández, acting Mayor
- Raúl L. Martínez, former Mayor
- Rudy García, former State Senator
- George Castro, shop worker

=== Campaign ===
The mayoral election took place in the midst of steep cuts in city government finances led by Hernández, which he campaigned on in the election. However, Hernández was attacked for the depth of the cuts, including to the city fire department, and his opponents criticized his handling of the budget. García called for a forensic audit, while Martínez argued that he was better-suited for reforming the city's budget, pointing to his past experience. The Miami Herald endorsed García, whom they praised as "[s]mart and well-versed on budget-making" and predicted "would bring consensus to a city that desperately needs it."

=== Results ===
Primary election results
Party	Candidate	Votes	%
Nonpartisan	Carlos Hernández	12,074	39.53%
Nonpartisan	Raúl L. Martínez	10,529	34.47%
Nonpartisan	Rudy García	7,838	25.66%
Nonpartisan	George "Yoyito" Castro	100	0.33%
Total votes		30,541	100.00%

== Runoff election ==
=== Results ===
2011 Hialeah mayoral special election
Party	Candidate	Votes	%
Nonpartisan	Carlos Hernández	19,055	60.89%
Nonpartisan	Raúl L. Martínez	12,239	39.11%
Total votes		31,294	100.00%
