= 2024 Miami-Dade County mayoral election =

- August 20, 2024; Officially nonpartisan
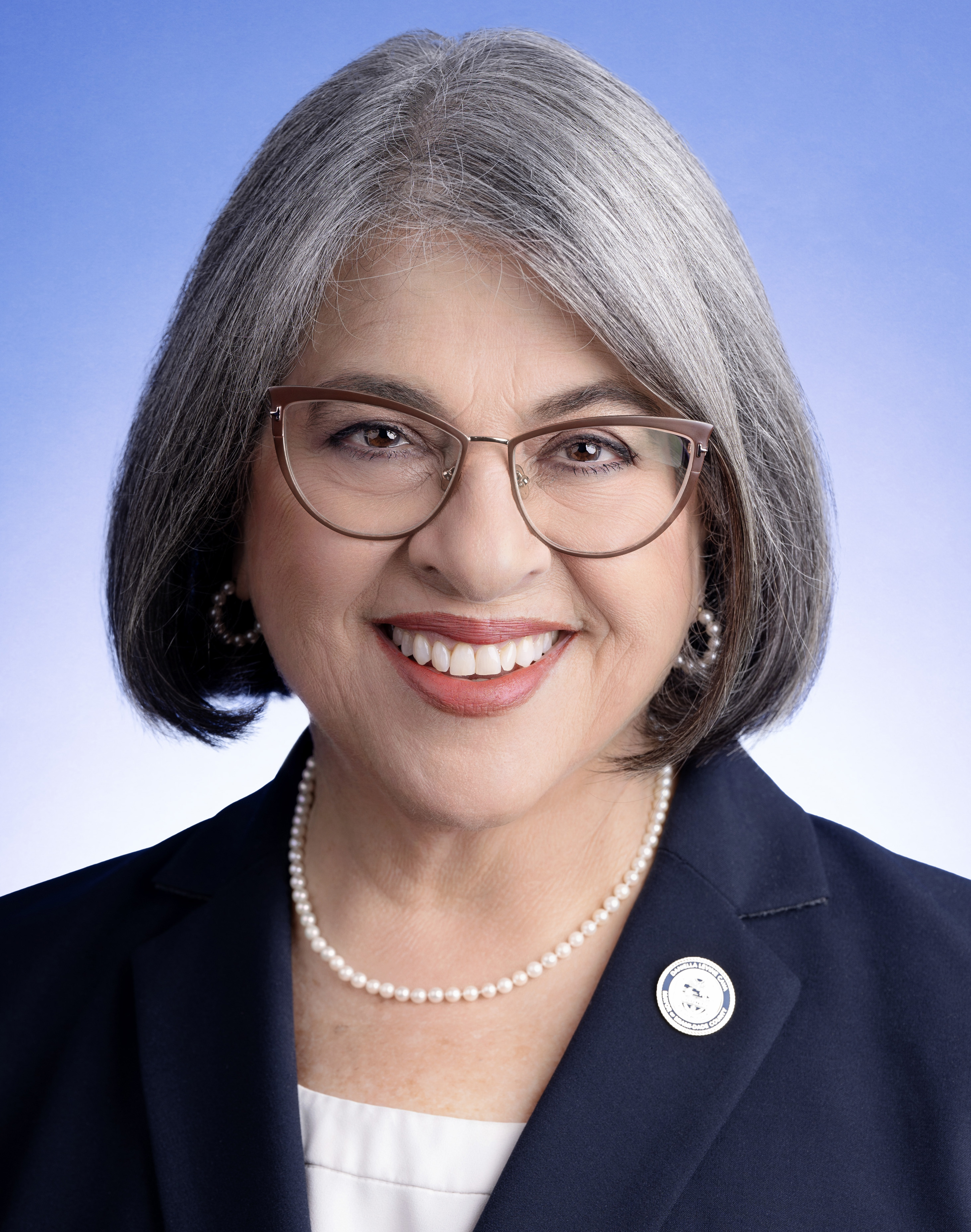

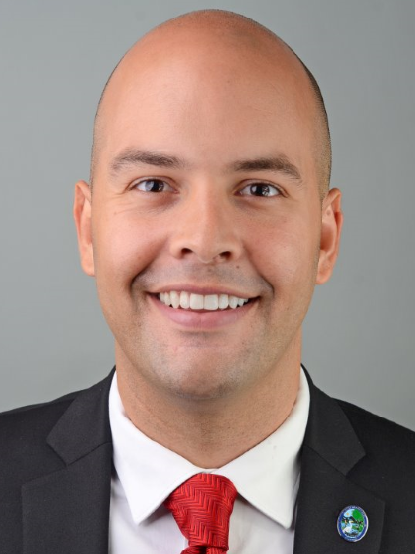

Candidate	Daniella Levine Cava	Manny Cid	Alexander Otaola
Popular vote	163,597	64,985	33,252
Percentage	57.9%	23.0%	11.8%
- Results by precinct Levine Cava: 30–40% 40–50% 50–60% 60–70% 70–80% 80–90% >90% Cid: 20–30% 30–40% 40–50% 50–60% >90% Tie: 30-40% 50% No data
Mayor before election
Daniella Levine Cava
Democratic
Elected Mayor
Daniella Levine Cava
Democratic

The 2024 Miami-Dade County mayoral election was held on August 20, 2024, to elect the mayor of Miami-Dade County, Florida. The election was officially nonpartisan; a runoff election would have occurred on November 5, 2024, if no candidate won a majority of the vote.

Incumbent Daniella Levine Cava, first elected in 2020 with 54.0% of the vote, was re-elected in a landslide.

On election night, early returns and precinct-level data indicated that Levine Cava would win every municipality except for Miami Lakes, home to her main opponent Manny Cid.

== Candidates ==
=== Declared ===
- Daniella Levine Cava, incumbent mayor (2020–present) (party preference: Democratic)
- Manny Cid, mayor of Miami Lakes (2016–present) (party preference: Republican)
- Shlomo Danzinger, former mayor of Surfside (party preference: Republican)
- Carlos Garín, actor and candidate for Florida's 28th congressional district in 2022 (party preference: Republican)
- Alexander Otaola, social media influencer and activist (party preference: Republican)
- Miguel Quintero, trapeze artist (party preference: Libertarian)
- Eddy Rojas, cargo and transportation executive (party preference: Independent)

=== Withdrawn ===
- Monique Barley, business consultant, daughter of former state representative Roy Hardemon, and candidate for mayor in 2020 (party preference: Democratic) (ran for state house)

=== Declined ===
- Jeanette Nuñez, lieutenant governor of Florida (2019–present) (party preference: Republican)

== General election ==
=== Endorsements ===
Manny Cid

Organizations

- Associated Builders and Contractors Florida East Coast
- Miami Young Republicans
Daniella Levine Cava

Local officials

- Javier Fernandez, mayor of South Miami
- Dan Gelber, mayor of Miami Beach
- 22 other mayors (Note: Shlomo Danzinger previously endorsed Levine Cava, but rescinded his endorsement after launching a campaign himself.)

Individuals

- Uncle Luke, rapper

Labor unions

- American Federation of State, County, and Municipal Employees Florida
- Metro Dade Firefighters (IAFF Local 1403)
- Service Employees International Union Florida and SEIU 32BJ
- South Florida AFL–CIO
- Teamsters Local 769
- UNITE HERE Local 355

Organizations

- EMILY's List
- Equality Florida Action PAC
- Sierra Club

=== Polling ===
Poll source	Date(s) administered	Sample size (Note: Key: A – all adults RV – registered voters LV – likely voters V – unclear)	Margin of error	Daniella Levine Cava	Manny Cid	Alexander Otaola	Other	Undecided
Dark Horse Strategies (R) (Note: Poll commissioned by Cid's campaign)	May 14, 2024	474 (LV)	± 5.0%	41%	20%	6%	3% (Note: Shlomo Danzinger with 2%; "Other" with 1%)	29%
EMC Research	November 13–16, 2023	348 (LV)	± 4.0%	66%	16%	15%	–	2%
EMC Research (Note: Poll commissioned by Levine Cava's campaign)	August 29 – September 2, 2023	1,987 (LV)	± 5.2%	56%	12%	–	–	32%

Hypothetical polling

Poll source	Date(s) administered	Sample size	Margin of error	Daniella Levine Cava	Carlos Giménez	Alexander Otaola	Undecided
EMC Research	August 29 – September 2, 2023	1,987 (LV)	± 5.2%	55%	19%	8%	18%

=== Results ===
2024 Miami-Dade County mayoral election
Candidate	Votes	%
Daniella Levine Cava (incumbent)	163,597	57.93%
Manny Cid	64,985	23.01%
Alexander Otaola	33,252	11.78%
Carlos Garín	8,333	2.95%
Shlomo Danzinger	5,300	1.88%
Eddy Rojas	3,608	1.28%
Miguel Quintero	3,313	1.17%
Total votes	282,388	100%

== Notes ==
Partisan clients
