= Carlos Hernández (politician) =

American politician (born 1961)

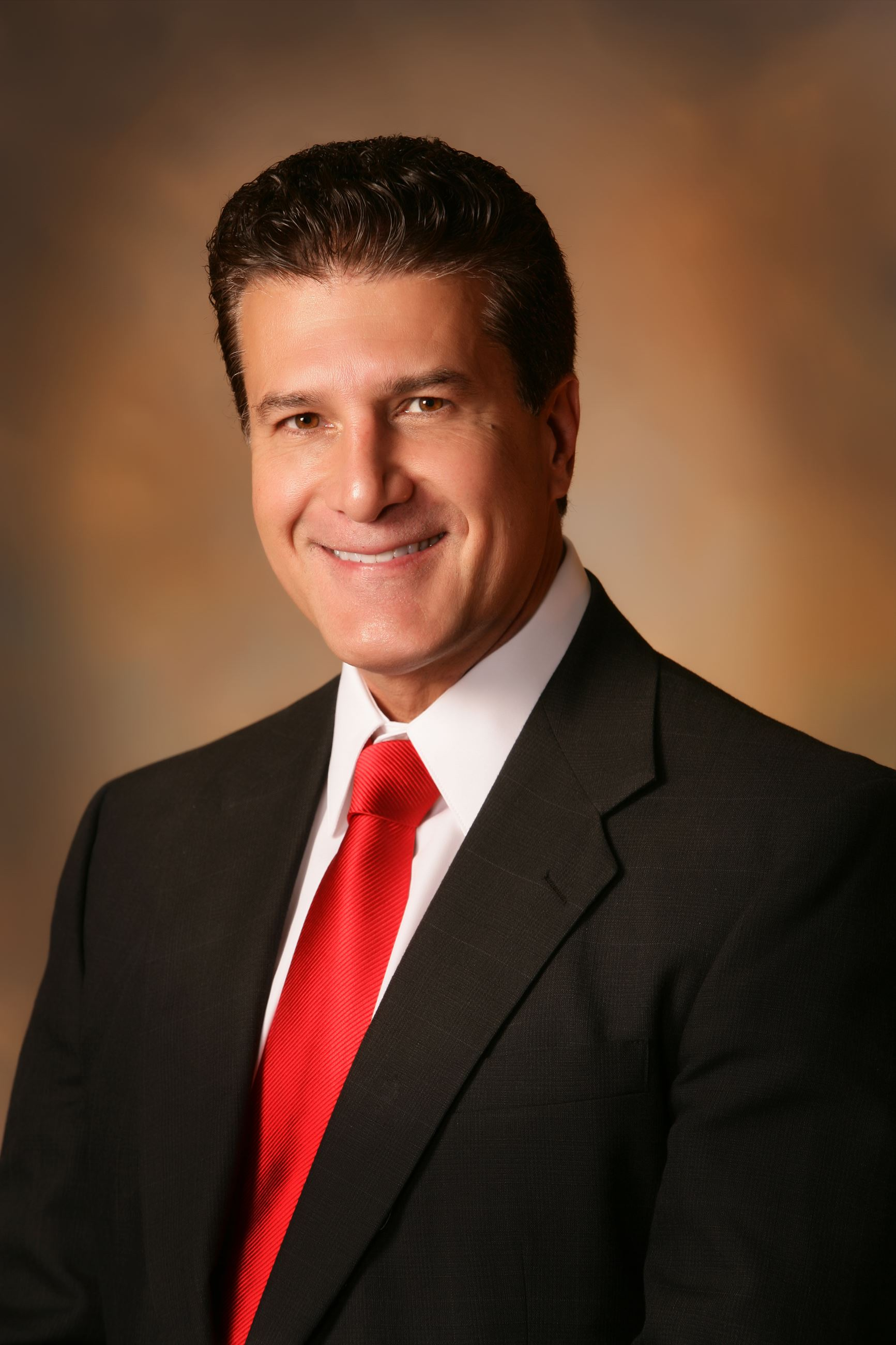

Mayor of Hialeah, Florida
- In office May 2011 – November 2021
- Preceded by: Julio Robaina
- Succeeded by: Esteban Bovo

Member of the Hialeah City Council from the 6th district
- In office November 30, 2005 – May 23, 2011
- Preceded by: Roberto Casas
- Succeeded by: Paul "Pablito" Hernandez

Personal details
- Born: March 8, 1961 (age 65) Camaguey, Cuba
- Party: Republican
- Spouse: Nancy Hernández
- Profession: Politician, retired police officer

Carlos Hernández (born March 8, 1961, in Camagüey, Cuba) is a Cuban-born American politician. Hernández served as the mayor of Hialeah, Florida, from May 2011 to November 2021. He became acting mayor in 2011 upon the resignation of his predecessor, Julio Robaina, who left the Hialeah mayoral office to pursue an unsuccessful campaign for Mayor of Miami-Dade County.

Hernández was raised in Hialeah, Florida. He received a bachelor's degree in organizational leadership from St. Thomas University in Miami Gardens.

Hernández was elected to the Hialeah city council in November 2005. He was further elected council president in 2007 and again in 2009 by the members of the council. Under the Hialeah city charter, Hernández, who was still council president in 2011, became Mayor of Hialeah upon the resignation of former Mayor Julio Robaina in 2011. Hernández won the 2011 special election and served out the remainder of Robaina's term. He was re-elected in 2013 and 2017.

== Ethics violation ==
In July 2015, the Miami-Dade County Ethics Commission made findings that Hernández had lied twice in an October 2011 press conference about high-interest loans of $180,000 to a convicted Ponzi schemer. He was fined $3,000 by the Miami-Dade County Ethics Commission.

On November 7, 2015, Hernández sent 28 buckets filled with pennies and nickels via a truck to pay the fine despite being ordered to pay with a check. The payment was refused and the Commission is now suing him for refusing to pay.

In May 2016, Hernández delivered 145 boxes of coins to a Miami bank that, in turn, transferred the $4,000 to the Miami-Dade County Ethics Commission.

In September 2019 he decided to cut the pay of The City of Hialeah Firefighters by 6% which, on average, is $500 or more per person. He claims that the cut was to raise pensions for other citizens without raising taxes.
