= 2011 Miami-Dade County mayoral special election =

- May 24, 2011 (first round); June 28, 2011 (runoff)
- Turnout: 15.96% ▼ (first round); 16.51% ▲ (runoff)
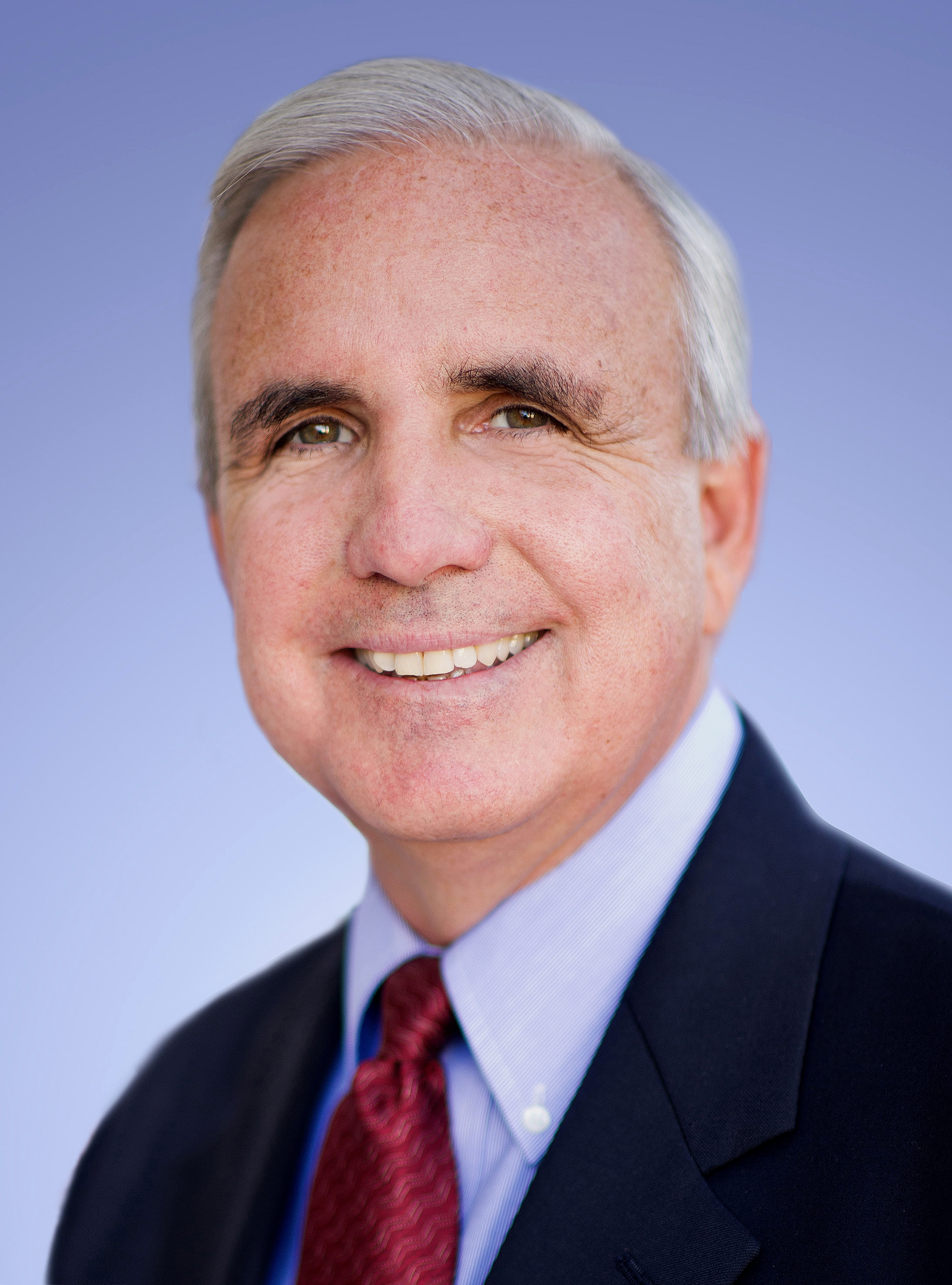

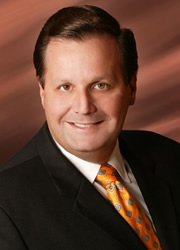

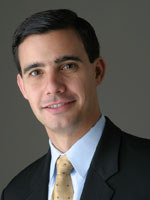

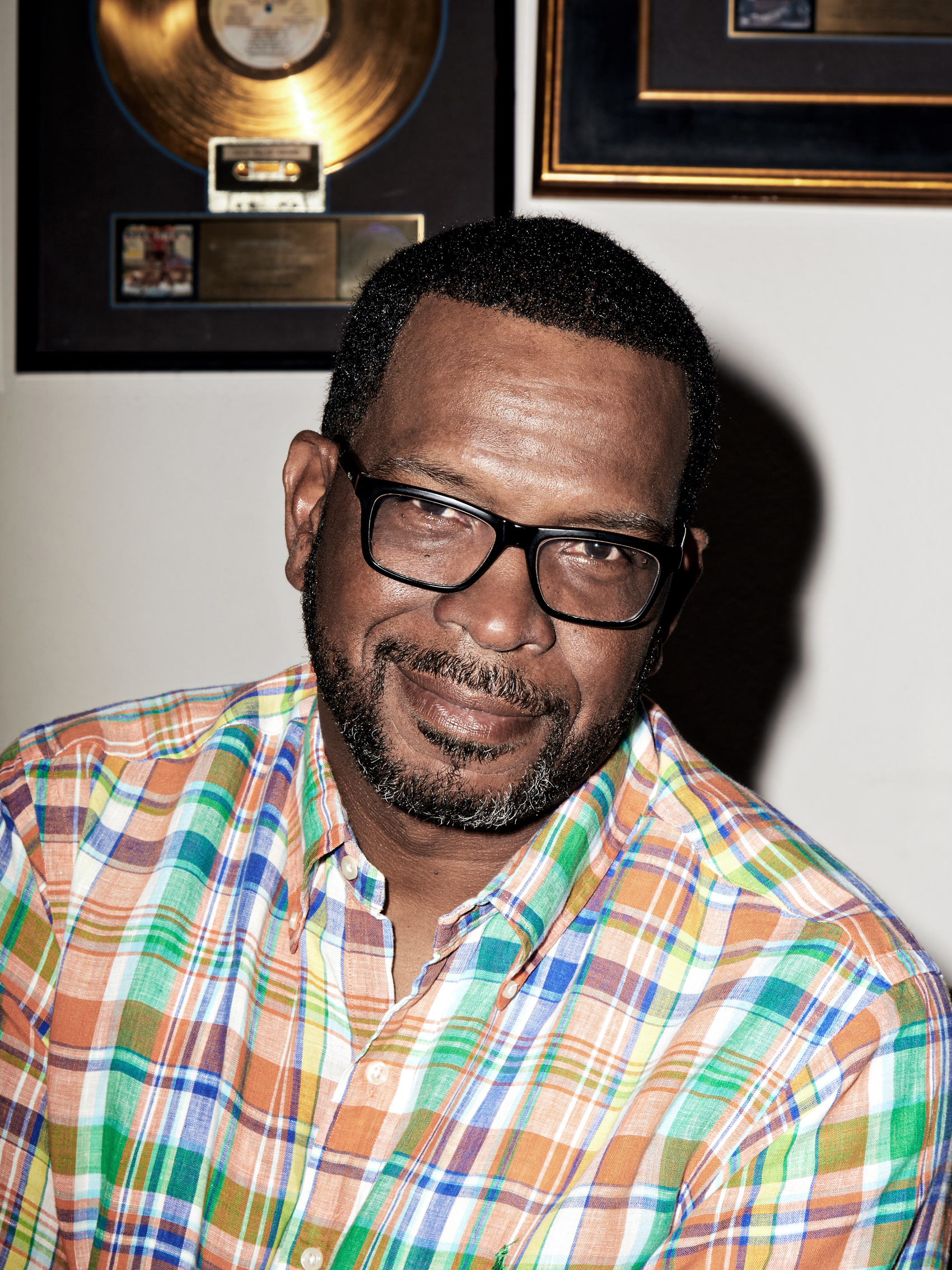
Candidate	Carlos A. Giménez	Julio Robaina
First round	55,180; 28.9%	64,507; 33.8%
Runoff	102,445; 51.0%	98,337; 49.0%
Candidate	Marcelo Llorente	Luther Campbell
First round	28,334; 14.8%	20,982; 11.0%
Runoff	Eliminated	Eliminated
Mayor before election
Vacant
Elected mayor
Carlos A. Giménez
Republican

The 2011 Miami-Dade County mayoral special election took place on May 24, 2011 and June 28, 2011 after the recall of County Mayor Carlos Álvarez earlier that year. After a May 24 first round, former County Commissioner Carlos A. Giménez narrowly defeated Hialeah Mayor Julio Robaina in a June 28 runoff. The election was officially nonpartisan.

== Candidates ==
- Carlos A. Giménez, County commissioner and former City of Miami Fire chief
- Julio Robaina, Mayor of Hialeah
- Marcelo Llorente, former state representative district 116
- Luther Campbell, rapper
- Roosevelt Bradley, businessman and member of the Miami-Dade Transit
- Jose "Pepe" Cancio, County Commission
- Jefferey Lampert
- Gabrielle Redfern, candidate for Miami Beach City commission
- Wilbur "Short Stop" Bell, Candidate for Dade County Commission district 3
- Eddie Lewis, candidate Miami Dade County Property Appraiser in 2008
- Farid Khavari, economist and gubernatorial candidate in 2010

== First round ==
=== Results ===
2011 Miami-Dade County mayoral special election
Candidate	Votes	%
Julio Robaina	64,507	33.76
Carlos A. Giménez	55,180	28.87
Marcelo Llorente	28,334	14.83
Luther Campbell	20,982	10.98
Roosevelt Bradley	7,293	3.82
Jose 'Pepe' Cancio	5,464	2.86
Jeffery Lampert	2,619	1.37
Gabrielle Redfern	2,446	1.28
Wilbur Bell	2,261	1.18
Eddie Lewis	1,269	0.66
Farid Khavari	763	0.40
Total votes	191,118	100.00

== Runoff ==
=== Results ===
2011 Miami-Dade County mayoral special election
Candidate	Votes	%
Carlos A. Giménez	102,445	51.02
Julio Robaina	98,337	48.98
Total votes	200,782	100.00
