= Alexander Otaola =

Cuban-American political activist and humorist

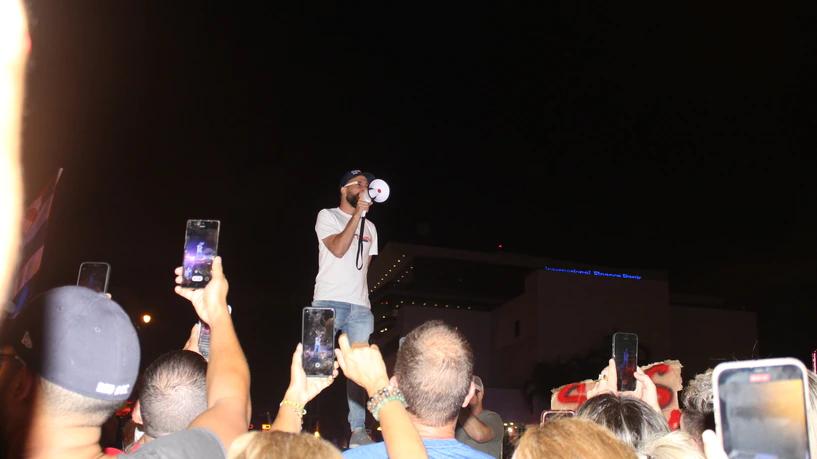
- Otaola speaking at a protest in 2021
- Born: Alexander Otaola Casal; April 28, 1979 (age 47); Camagüey, Cuba
- Other names: El rey del chisme, El rey de Facebook Live
- Known for: Activism, television, comedy, acting, influencing
- Political party: Republican (2017–present); Democratic (2010–2017)
- Website: holaotaola.com

Alexander Otaola Casal (Spanish: [aleɣsanˈdeɾ otaˈola kaˈsal], born April 28, 1979) is a Cuban-American social media influencer, comedian and political activist. Otaola is the host of the web show Hola Ota-Ola!, an informative and satirical program that covers entertainment, news and politics. His show debuted on Cubanos por el Mundo, a cross platform media initiative, website, and YouTube channel that covers politics, news, and celebrity culture in Cuba and the Cuban exile community. Otaola is a vocal opponent of the communist Cuban government and its human rights violations and crimes. In 2023, Otaola registered his candidacy to run in the 2024 Miami-Dade County mayoral election. He came in third in the election, garnering less than 12% of the total vote.

== Biography ==
Otaola was born in Camagüey, Cuba, on April 28, 1979. For secondary school, he studied at a special athletic school in Cuba known as ESPA where he trained in water polo, horse riding, chess and ended up in gymnastics and musical aerobics. In an interview with CiberCuba, Otaola said he was born in a society with a culture often favoring a strong sense of masculinity ("machismo") and experienced bullying and homophobia in Cuba.

On December 3, 2003, Otaola emigrated to the United States from Cuba after obtaining a visa. He settled in Miami where he worked as a waiter, cashier at Walmart, baker, and a manager in a housekeeping business.

In 2008, he returned to television and worked in telenovelas and comedy shows. He portrayed the character "Carlos Recto" in the MEGATV show Esta Noche Tu Night hosted by Alexis Valdés, and also participated in a Venevision talk show called ¿Quién Tiene la Razón? Later in 2015, he was suspended by the television network Mega TV for using an obscene word during an interview. In 2017, he started webcasting his show Hola Ota-Ola!, which has a large audience in Cuba and the United States.

== Political activism ==
Otaola has organized boycotts on Cuban artists such as Haila Mompié, Jacob Forever, El Micha, and Gente de Zona which has resulted in their shows being canceled in Miami. As a result of his social media activism, Haila Mompié was declared persona non grata in the city of Miami by the mayor Francis Suarez.

In 2019, Otaola criticized the daughter of Raúl Castro, Mariela Castro, for canceling the annual gay pride parade in Cuba and failing to protect gay rights activists from violence by Cuban security forces.

On social media, Otaola has attempted to uncover Ciberclarias, which he claims are false profiles that spread propaganda for the Cuban government.

On February 29, 2020, Otaola organized a caravan in Calle Ocho, Miami, for the liberation of Cuba, the release of political prisoners in Cuba, and to support the Trump administration's policies on Cuba. According to the Miami Herald, the caravan consisted in as many as 2,000 cars. Following the car caravan to condemn the Cuban regime, Otaola congregated a second caravan to support "law, order, and peace."

During the George Floyd protests, Otaola joined the BlackTuesday campaign on Instagram in support of black victims of police violence and added the hashtag #AllLivesMatter. Otaola said on his show: "If we are going to fight racism, it is not by segregating or separating into races that we are going to achieve it". He also said the murder of George Floyd was not justified and the police officer kneeling on his neck should be punished. He also expressed his belief that mainstream media and the left were trying to promote vandalism and portray Floyd like a hero.

=== José Daniel Ferrer ===
On his show, Otaola repeatedly demanded the release of José Daniel Ferrer, a human rights activist which had been arrested in 2003 for his participation in the Varela Project. In 2019, he called for a proof-of-life on Ferrer; later that year, he proved that alleged videos of Ferrer showing aggression and displaying weapons were manipulated. Upon Ferrer's being remanded to house arrest in 2020, Ferrer was interviewed on Hola Ota-Ola! and expressed gratitude for raising awareness to secure his release.

== Controversy ==
=== Descemer Bueno ===
In 2019, Otoala sued Descemer Bueno for defamation and it has resulted in an ongoing court battle.

=== Roberto F. Hidalgo Puentes ===
In May 2018, Otaola filed a police report which alleges that Roberto F. Hidalgo Puentes, half of the Cuban duo Yomil y Dany, assaulted him inside a store in Miami. In a statement to Martí Noticias, Otaola said this is not the first time he has been threatened by Hidalgo, and he alleges Hidalgo threatened to kill him during an event in Punta Cana. Hidalgo returned to Cuba after the incident. In 2018 according to Daniel Benítez of WJAN-CD, a Miami-Dade judge signed an arrest warrant for Hidalgo.

=== 5 de Septiembre accusations ===
On January 10, 2020, Julio Martínez Molina published an article in the Cienfuegos newspaper, 5 de Septiembre, which alleged that Otaola is accused of sexual abuse of a minor in Cuba. Otaola has denied the allegation and has consulted with his legal team to request the statement's retraction.

=== Chocolate MC ===
During an interview Chocolate MC walked out of the Hola Ota-Ola! show. Since their initial meeting, Otaola and Chocolate MC have reconciled. Chocolate MC attended the Caravan in 2020.

=== Red List ===
On his show he has an ongoing list of Cuban artists, celebrities, and business people who continue to work in Cuba while also possessing a green card in order to reside or work in the United States.

=== Boycotts ===
Critics have voiced concern about Otaola's advocacy for boycotting certain Cuban artists. Several Cuban-Americans who were interviewed by the Associated Press criticized the ban as an act of discrimination and censorship. However, the mayor of Miami Francis Suarez supported the ban stating: "It's not about intolerance or censorship, it's about respect and recognizing the mortifying history of communism, especially in Cuba".
