= Esteban Bovo =

American politician

Steve Bovo
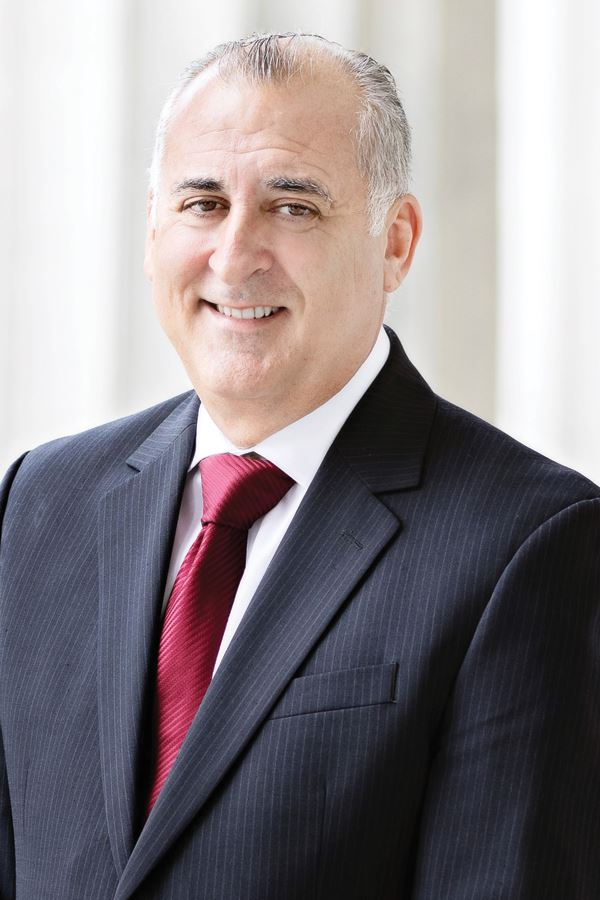

Mayor of Hialeah
- In office November 2021 – April 27, 2025
- Preceded by: Carlos Hernández
- Succeeded by: Jacqueline Garcia-Roves

Member of the Miami-Dade County Commission from the 13th district
- In office May 25, 2011 – November 17, 2020
- Preceded by: Natacha Seijas
- Succeeded by: René García

Member of the Florida House of Representatives from the 110th district
- In office November 4, 2008 – March 25, 2011
- Preceded by: René García
- Succeeded by: José R. Oliva

Personal details
- Born: June 12, 1962 (age 64)
- Party: Republican
- Spouse: Viviana Bovo
- Children: 5

Esteban L. "Steve" Bovo Jr. (born June 12, 1962) is an American politician from Florida and the former mayor of Hialeah, Florida. Bovo previously served on the Hialeah City Council, in the Florida House of Representatives, and on the Miami-Dade County Commission. He ran for mayor of Miami-Dade County in 2020, losing to Daniella Levine Cava. Prior to serving as an elected official, Bovo worked at the historic Hialeah Park as a marketing and advertising executive.

== Early and personal life ==
Bovo was born in Queens, New York, on June 12, 1962, to Marilyn and Esteban Bovo-Carás. His father was a member of the 2506 Brigade. He earned his Associate's degree in Business Administration from Miami-Dade Community College in 1983 and his Bachelor of Science degree in Political Science from Florida International University in 1987.

Bovo lived in the Village Green area prior to moving to the City of Hialeah. He is married to Viviana and has five children: Oscar, Bianca, Esteban, Sofia, and Alessandro.

== Political career ==
Candidate for Miami-Dade County Mayor

In October 2020, Bovo announced he was running for Miami-Dade County Mayor. Bovo later officially qualified as a candidate in June 2020. Bovo and his colleague, Commissioner Daniela Levine Cava, received the top two spots in the Tuesday, August 18, 2020, primary. Bovo received 29.41% of the vote and Levine Cava at 28.62%. A runoff was held on November 3, 2020, in which Bovo received 46% to Levine Cava's 54%.

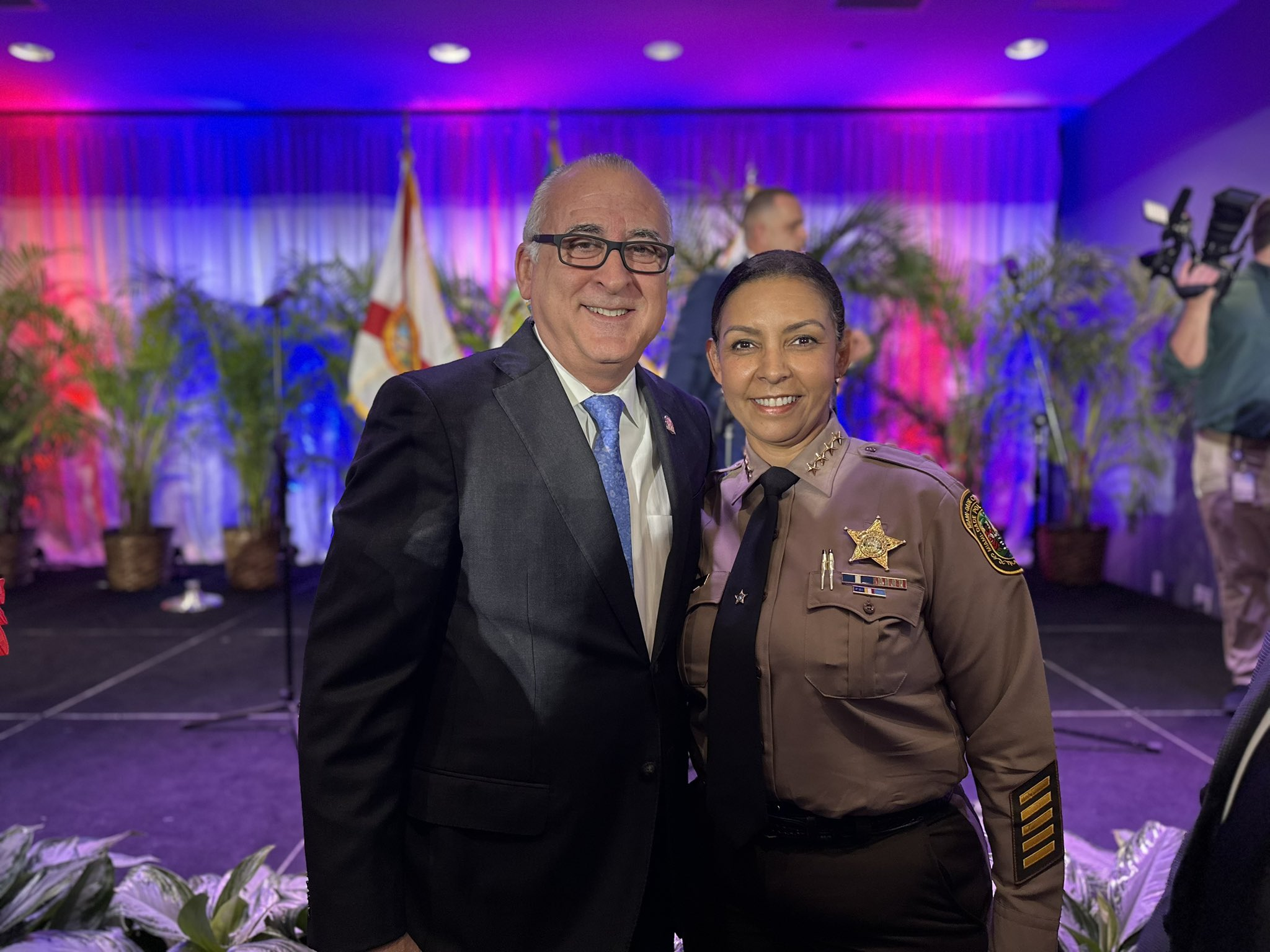
Bovo with Sheriff Rosie Cordero-Stutz, January 13, 2025

In April 2025, Bovo stepped down as mayor of Hialeah.

== Sources ==
- City of Hialeah Council 1998-2008
- Florida House of Representatives Profile
- Miami-Dade County Commissioner Esteban L. Bovo, Jr. Biography
- Miami-Dade County Chairman's Report - 2017-2018
