= Carlos A. Gimenez =

Cuban-American politician (born 1954)

Carlos A. Giménez
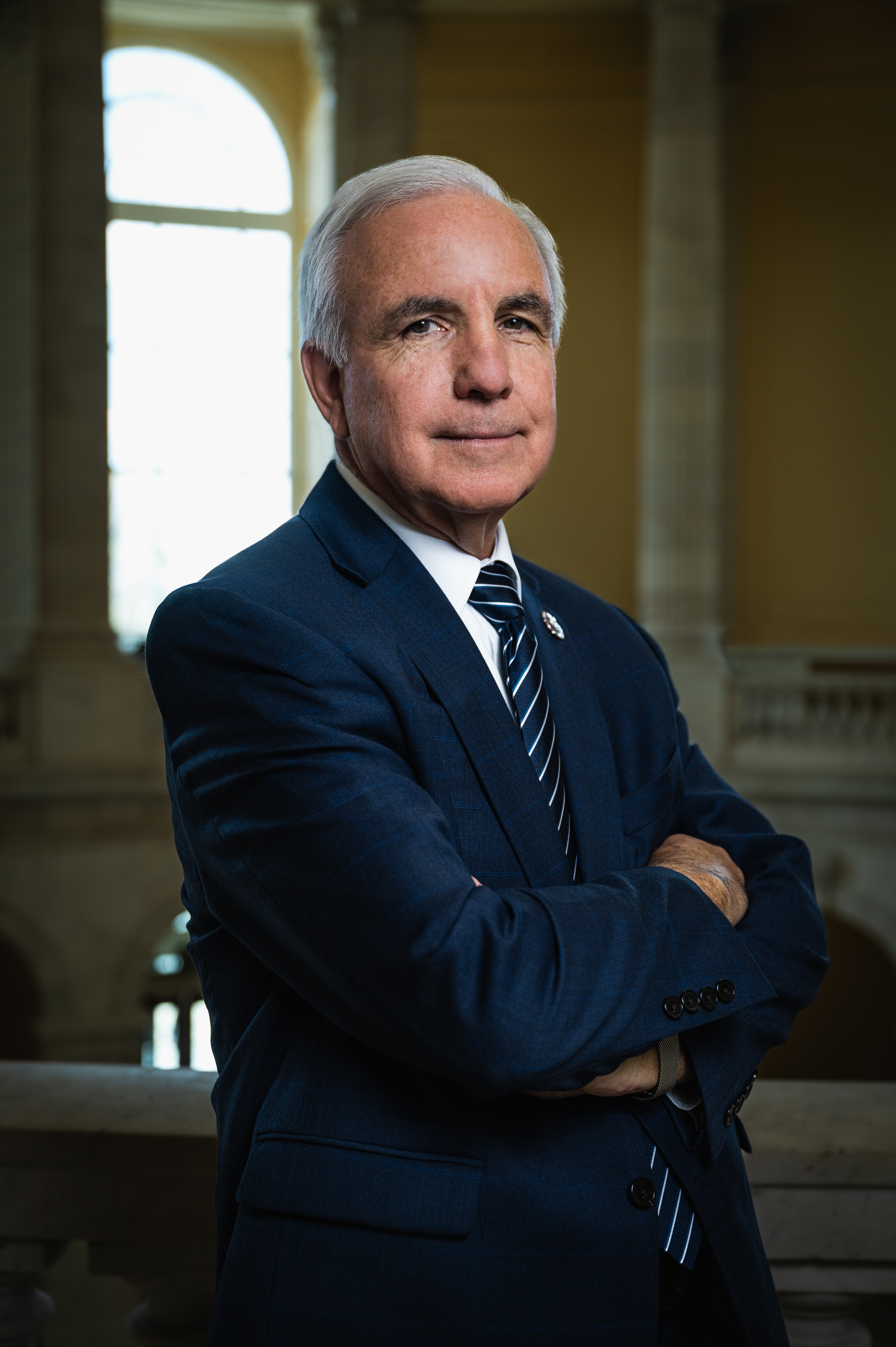
- Official portrait, 2023

Member of the U.S. House of Representatives from Florida
- Incumbent
- Assumed office January 3, 2021
- Preceded by: Debbie Mucarsel-Powell
- Constituency: 26th district (2021–2023); 28th district (2023–present)

7th Mayor of Miami-Dade County
- In office July 1, 2011 – November 17, 2020
- Preceded by: Carlos Álvarez
- Succeeded by: Daniella Levine Cava

Member of the Miami-Dade County Commission from the 7th district
- In office January 3, 2005 – April 12, 2011
- Preceded by: Jimmy Morales
- Succeeded by: Xavier Suarez

City Manager of Miami
- In office May 9, 2000 – January 29, 2003
- Appointed by: Joe Carollo
- Preceded by: Donald Warshaw
- Succeeded by: Joe Arriola

Personal details
- Born: Carlos Antonio Giménez; January 17, 1954 (age 72) Havana, Cuba
- Party: Republican
- Spouse: Lourdes Portela (m. 1975)
- Children: 3
- Education: Barry University (BA)
- Website: House website Campaign website

Carlos Antonio Giménez (/hiˈmɛnɛz/ hee-MEH-nez; born January 17, 1954) is a Cuban-born American politician and retired firefighter serving in the U.S. House of Representatives since 2021. He has represented Florida's 28th congressional district since 2023, previously representing the 26th district in his first term. He is a member of the Republican Party.

Prior to serving in Congress, Giménez was mayor of Miami-Dade County from 2011 to 2020. He served as a Miami-Dade County Commissioner from 2003 to 2011, and was the fire chief of the Miami Fire-Rescue Department. He was a supporter of Hillary Clinton in the 2016 presidential election, but ran as a supporter and endorsee of President Donald Trump in 2020, defeating Democratic incumbent Debbie Mucarsel-Powell.

Giménez serves as one of the Republican assistant whips under Steve Scalise.

== Early life and education ==
Giménez was born in Havana, Cuba, in 1954 into a prosperous landowner family from the Oriente province. His family immigrated to the United States after losing their lands in the Cuban Revolution and the subsequent agrarian reforms, settling in what became Miami's Little Havana.

Giménez attended Christopher Columbus High School near Miami and earned a bachelor's degree in public administration from Barry University. In 1993, he completed the Program for Senior Executives in State and Local Government at Harvard University's John F. Kennedy School of Government.

== Miami Fire-Rescue Department ==
Giménez joined the Miami Fire-Rescue Department as a firefighter in 1975. He was appointed fire chief in 1991, becoming the first Cuban-American to hold the position, and served until 2000.

Giménez is a former member of the International City Managers Association, the International Association of Fire Chiefs, the National Fire Protection Association, the Florida Fire Chiefs, and the Fire Officers Association of Miami-Dade. He also served on the Federal Emergency Management Agency Urban Search and Rescue Advisory Committee and as the chair of the Legal Issues Subcommittee.

== Miami City manager (2000–2003) ==
Official portrait of Giménez as city manager

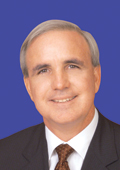
Official portrait of Giménez as county commissioner

From May 2000 to January 2003, Giménez served as city manager of Miami proper, appointed by then-mayor Joe Carollo to replace incumbent Donald Warshaw. During his tenure, the city government (exiting a fiscal crisis) improved its bond credit rating from junk status to in excess of investment grade.

== Miami-Dade county commissioner (2005–2011) ==
In 2004, Giménez was elected as a Miami-Dade County Commissioner for the county's 7th district, beating former mayor of Miami Xavier Suarez. His district included Miami proper, the Village of Key Biscayne, Coral Gables, South Miami, Kendall, and Pinecrest.

== County mayoralty (2011–2020) ==
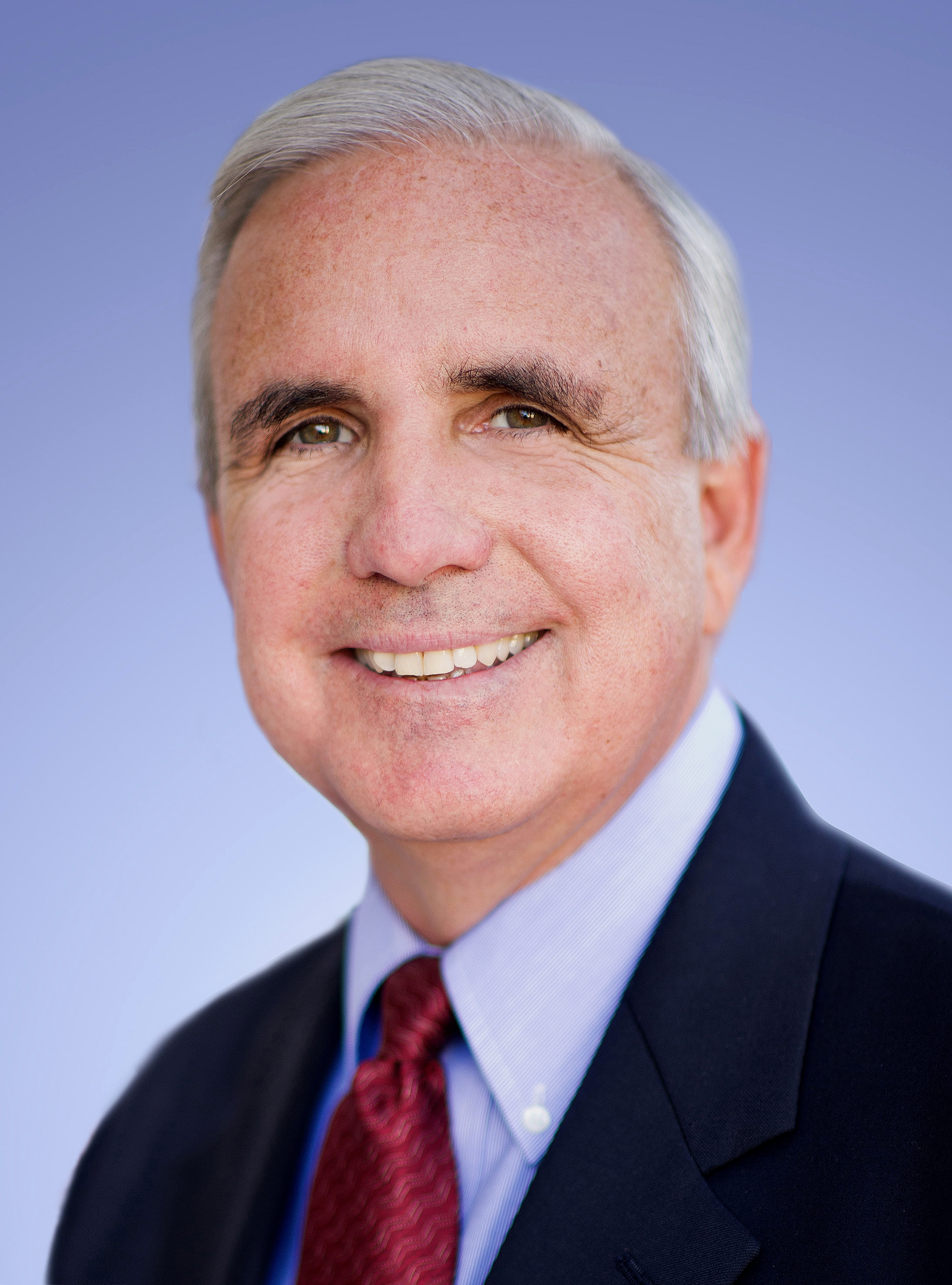
2011 portrait photograph

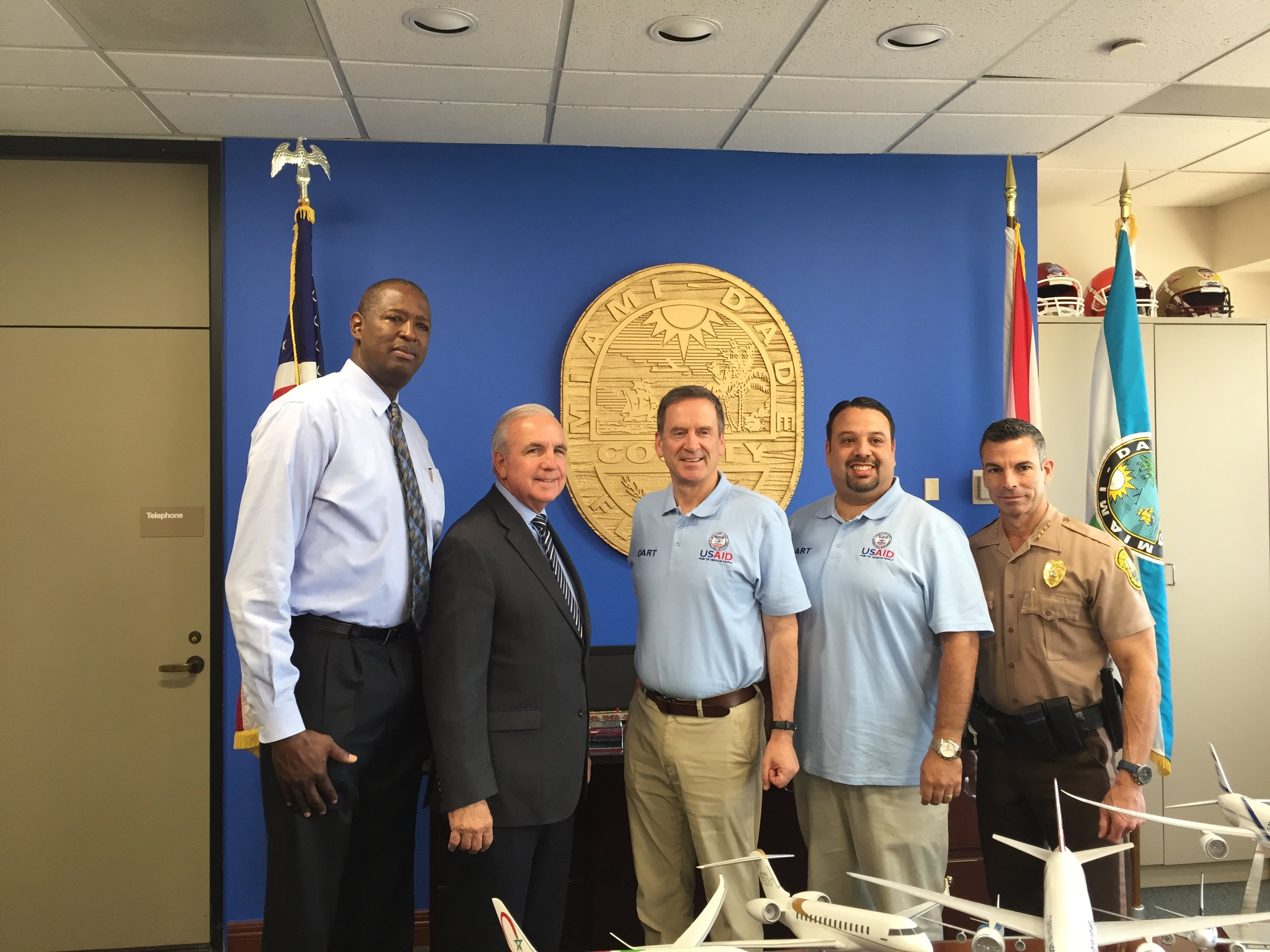
Mayor Carlos Giménez meets with Mark Andrew Green, USAID Administrator

Giménez was elected mayor of the metropolitan government of Miami-Dade County, Florida on June 28, 2011, in the 2011 Miami-Dade County mayoral special election. Incumbent mayor Carlos Alvarez had been recalled in one of the largest recall elections of a municipal official in U.S. history. No candidate got over 50% of the popular vote in the first round, so a runoff election was held. Giménez won the runoff with 51% of the vote to Julio Robaina's 49%.

During his 2011 campaign, Giménez promised that if elected, he would cut his own salary. After he was elected, he kept this promise, cutting his own salary and benefits by 50%.

Giménez was reelected in the 2012 Miami-Dade County mayoral election with 54% of the vote against multiple candidates, and in 2016 with 56% of the vote against school board member Raquel Regalado.

Giménez supported Miami's unsuccessful bid to be the site of the 2020 Democratic National Convention.

=== Cooperation with ICE ===
In 2017, President Donald Trump signed an executive order targeting "sanctuary" jurisdictions that limited or refused to cooperate with federal immigration authorities, ordering a review of their access to federal funding. Miami-Dade received a letter from the administration that the county had been flagged as a sanctuary jurisdiction. Giménez then ordered the director of his corrections department to begin honoring all requests by Immigration and Customs Enforcement (ICE). The Miami Dade County Board of Commissioners formally codified his order by a 9 to 3 vote. The Department of Justice later confirmed the county was no longer flagged as a sanctuary jurisdiction. In December 2018, the Florida Third District Court of Appeal dismissed a lawsuit filed in state court challenging the county's detention policy.

=== Election administration ===
In the lead-up to the 2020 election, which took place during the COVID-19 pandemic, Giménez limited the number of ballot drop locations. His office sent mail-in ballots to voters later than required by state law.

Before the 2020 election, the Miami Heat sought to make AmericanAirlines Arena the early voting site for downtown Miami. In the wake of the murder of George Floyd, the NBA had sought to "channel demands for social justice into a voting drive by turning arenas into polling places." The city was close to signing an agreement with the Heat that included a ban on political advertising in the arena while voting was underway. Giménez intervened and the city ultimately selected the Phillip and Patricia Frost Museum of Science, a previous longtime polling location, as Miami's early voting location, citing its proximity to a Metromover station as well as access to ground-level parking. The Frost Museum site was smaller than the arena and elections staff had not mentioned it on a draft list of 33 early voting sites that the staff worked on to prepare safe voting during a pandemic.

== U.S. House of Representatives ==
=== Elections ===
==== 2020 ====
In January 2020, Giménez announced his candidacy for the Republican nomination in the 2020 U.S. House election for Florida's 26th congressional district. He was term-limited from running again as mayor. Four years earlier, in the 2016 presidential election, Giménez had endorsed Hillary Clinton. In 2020, he said that he had "made a mistake" in supporting Clinton. Having previously distanced himself from Trump, Giménez ran as a pro-Trump Republican in 2020. He ran on a platform of repealing the Affordable Care Act (Obamacare) and opposing a carbon tax. Trump endorsed Giménez in January 2020. On August 18, 2020, Giménez won the Republican primary election, defeating Omar Blanco with 59.9% of the vote. In the general election, he defeated incumbent Democrat Debbie Mucarsel-Powell. He was likely aided by Trump's strong showing in Miami-Dade County: he carried the 26th district with 53% of the vote after losing it by 16 percentage points four years earlier.

=== Tenure ===
In late 2020, Giménez was a member of Freedom Force, a group of incoming Republican House members who "say they're fighting against socialism in America".

On February 4, 2021, he joined 10 other House Republicans voting with all voting Democrats to strip Marjorie Taylor Greene of her House Education and Labor Committee, and House Budget Committee assignments in response to conspiratorial and violent statements she had made.

In 2023, Giménez was one of 18 Republicans who voted against Jim Jordan's nomination for Speaker of the House all three times.

In March 2021, Giménez voted against the American Rescue Plan Act of 2021.

In February 2026, Giménez joined Senators Rick Scott and Ashley Moody at a press conference in Doral following the capture of Venezuelan president Nicolás Maduro. Speaking to NBC 6 South Florida, Gimenez stated that Trump had also "turned his eye" toward Cuba, noting that "the Cuban regime is at the weakest point it's been in a very, very long time."

=== Committee assignments ===
For the 119th Congress:

- Committee on Armed Services
  - Subcommittee on Readiness
  - Subcommittee on Tactical Air and Land Forces
- Committee on Homeland Security
  - Subcommittee on Cybersecurity and Infrastructure Protection
  - Subcommittee on Transportation and Maritime Security (Chairman)
- Select Committee on Strategic Competition between the United States and the Chinese Communist Party

=== Caucus memberships ===
- Climate Solutions Caucus
- Main Street Caucus
- Republican Governance Group

== Political positions ==
=== Epstein files ===
During the congressional debate over the Epstein Files Transparency Act, Representative Carlos A. Giménez (R-FL) gave mixed public signals about the release of documents related to the Jeffrey Epstein investigation. Earlier in 2025, Giménez downplayed the issue, telling CNN that “Americans are over the Epstein case” and stating that he had not heard concerns from constituents about the files, remarks that were cited by local media as evidence of his reluctance to prioritize the legislation.

Giménez later voted in favor of the Epstein Files Transparency Act when it reached the House floor on November 18, 2025. Reporting noted that the vote occurred after President Donald Trump publicly indicated support for allowing the legislation to advance, at which point most House Republicans, including Giménez, backed the measure.

=== 2016 vote for Hillary Clinton ===
On Oct. 9, 2016, in a televised debate while running for reelection as County Mayor, Giménez said that he would vote for Hillary Clinton and called on Donald Trump to step down as his party’s nominee. Giménez said on CBS4, “Between Donald Trump and Hillary Clinton, I’m not voting for Donald Trump. Obviously, I must be voting for Hillary Clinton.” He continued, “Donald Trump needs to step down. I don’t think he is viable as a presidential candidate.”

=== 2020 presidential election ===
After Joe Biden won the 2020 election and Trump refused to concede while making false claims of fraud, Giménez defended Trump and said he should not concede. He later voted against certification of Arizona's and Pennsylvania's electoral votes. Giménez voted against the second impeachment of Donald Trump on January 13, 2021.

On May 19, 2021, Giménez was one of 35 Republicans who joined all Democrats in voting to approve legislation to establish the January 6 commission meant to investigate the storming of the U.S. Capitol.

=== Immigration ===
In April 2026, Giménez was one of six Republicans who joined all Democrats in voting to grant Temporary Protected Status to approximately 350,000 Haitian immigrants, despite efforts by Donald Trump to terminate the program.

=== LGBT rights ===
In 2021, Giménez was among the House Republicans to sponsor the Fairness for All Act, the Republican-proposed alternative to the Equality Act. The bill would prohibit discrimination on the basis of sex, sexual orientation, and gender identity, and protect the free exercise of religion. While he was Miami-Dade mayor, Giménez announced his support for the Supreme Court ruling Obergefell v. Hodges, which held that same-sex marriage bans violate the Constitution.

In 2021, Giménez was one of 29 Republicans to vote to reauthorize the Violence Against Women Act. This bill expanded legal protections for transgender people, and contained provisions allowing transgender women to use women's shelters and serve time in prisons matching their gender identity.

On July 19, 2022, Giménez and 46 other Republican representatives voted for the Respect for Marriage Act, which would codify the right to same-sex marriage in federal law.

=== Gun rights ===
In March 2021, Giménez was one of only eight Republicans to join the House majority in passing the Bipartisan Background Checks Act of 2021.

=== Veterans ===
Giménez voted against the Honoring our PACT Act of 2022 which authorized $797 billion in new spending and expanded VA benefits to veterans exposed to toxic chemicals during their military service.

== Electoral history ==
Miami-Dade County mayoral election, 2016
Party	Candidate	Votes	%
Republican	Carlos A. Giménez (incumbent)	475,547	55.83%
Republican	Raquel Regalado	376,249	44.17%

Florida's 26th congressional district election, 2020
Party	Candidate	Votes	%
Republican	Carlos A. Giménez	177,211	51.7
Democratic	Debbie Mucarsel-Powell (incumbent)	165,377	48.3
Total votes		342,588	100.0
Republican gain from Democratic			

Florida's 28th congressional district election, 2022
Party	Candidate	Votes	%
Republican	Carlos Giménez (incumbent)	134,457	63.69
Democratic	Robert Asencio	76,665	36.31
Total votes		211,122	100.0
Republican hold			

Florida's 28th congressional district election, 2024
Party	Candidate	Votes	%
Republican	Carlos Giménez (incumbent)	210,057	64.57
Democratic	Phil Ehr	115,280	35.43
Total votes		325,337	100.00
Republican hold			

== Personal life ==
Giménez is married to Lourdes Portela, with whom he has three children. Giménez is Catholic.

== See also ==
- List of Hispanic and Latino Americans in the United States Congress
- Hispanic and Latino conservatism in the United States

Political offices
Preceded by Carlos Álvarez	Mayor of Miami-Dade County; 2011–2020	Succeeded by Daniella Levine Cava
U.S. House of Representatives
Preceded by Debbie Mucarsel-Powell	Member of the U.S. House of Representatives from Florida's 26th congressional district 2021–2023	Succeeded by Mario Díaz-Balart
New constituency	Member of the U.S. House of Representatives from Florida's 28th congressional district 2023–present	Incumbent
U.S. order of precedence (ceremonial)
Preceded by Andrew Garbarino	United States representatives by seniority 253rd	Succeeded by Diana Harshbarger
