= Farid Khavari =

American economist

Personal details
- Born: February 25, 1943 (age 83) Yazd, Iran
- Spouse: Janilla Khavari
- Children: 2
- Education: University of Hamburg; University of Bremen
- Website: Authorial website

Farid A. Khavari (Persian: فرید خاوری) is an Iranian American economist, author, patent-holder, designer, and small business owner. In 2010 and 2014, he ran as an independent candidate for Governor of Florida.

== Personal ==
Khavari was born in Yazd, Iran. He was among the first group of people to serve in the Iranian Education Corps and spent two years teaching in a northern Iranian village. Khavari graduated from the University of Hamburg with a Masters in Economics (1973) and went on to earn a Ph.D. in economics from the University of Bremen (1976).

He is married to Janilla A. Khavari, and together they have two children.

== Career ==
After earning a Ph.D. in economics, Khavari served as a research associate at several economic institutes in Germany. He was also the editor of Raw Materials at Entwicklungspolitische Informationen. He has written ten groundbreaking books, and numerous articles regarding economics, the environment, energy, oil, healthcare, and the Middle East, published in the United States, Germany, the Netherlands, Switzerland, former Yugoslavia, and Iran.

In 1978, Khavari entered the Solar Energy industry and formed General Solar Technology, Inc. in Miami, Florida. While at GST, Khavari worked in both research & development and in the manufacturing, distribution and installation of solar energy systems.

=== 2010 gubernatorial candidate ===
On June 22, 2009, Khavari announced his intention to run for Governor as a Democratic candidate. On his campaign website, Khavari stated that "Florida has huge economic potential, but what we have are huge economic problems. We can't look to Wall Street, or the banks, or Washington, or our Florida politicians to solve these problems. Our Florida politicians helped create this mess, yet not one of them has a plan to fix it, only plans for how to get elected." Khavari goes on to say "That is why I am running for governor. I am an economist, and I have a comprehensive plan to solve Florida's economic problems without higher taxes. This plan will also enable you and your family, and all Floridians, to build the economic security you need and deserve."

A key part of Khavari's economic plan is to create The Bank of the State of Florida. "Using the fractional reserve regulations that govern all banks, we can earn billions per year for Florida's treasury, while saving thousands of dollars per year for Florida homeowners," Khavari said. "After we cover the $50 billion in Florida State Board of Administration losses, we can reduce taxes."

Thus far, Khavari's Economic Plan has received a positive response, with some asking whether it could work in their state or municipality.

=== 2016 Miami-Dade County mayoral run ===
In 2016, Mr. Khavari ran for Miami-Dade County Mayor, on a platform of local ecological and economic concerns, such as sea level rise, the Turkey Point Nuclear Plant, and the Biscayne Aquifer.

== Books authored ==
Khavari is the author of ten books. He has also written numerous articles on energy, economics and politics. Khavari's 1993 book Environomics was praised for proposing a "comprehensive and thought-provoking revisioning of contemporary economic practice and understandings."

=== Bibliography ===
- “The Final Crash: The End of US Dominance in 2013" (2011)
- “Towards a Zero-Cost Economy: A Blueprint to Create General Economic Security in a Carefree Economy” (2009)
- “The Final Reckoning: The Islamic Plot to Destroy the Dollar” (1995) Publisher: ARFA Pub. Co; Not Stated edition (1995)
- “Environomics: The Economics of Environmentally Safe Prosperity” (1993)
- “Oil & Islam: The Ticking Bomb” (1990)
- “Vultures: Doctors, Lawyers, Hospitals and Insurance Companies: What’s Wrong, and What to Do About It” (1990)
- “Die OPEC im weltwirtschaftlichen Spannungsfeld – Ein Beitrag zur Discussion um die “neue Weltwirtschaftsordung”” (Opec and the New World Economic Order) (1975)
- “Die Oelpreispolitik der OPEC-Laender – Grenzen, Gruende und Hintergruende” (The Oil Price Policy of the OPEC Countries: Limits, Reasons and Backgrounds) (1975)
- “Die Oelkrisen bedrohen den Wohlstand des Westens” (The Oil Crises Threatening the Prosperity of the West). (1973)
- “Sepahe Danesh dar rahe sazendeghiya roustaha” (Education Corps in Building the Villages) (1964)

== Patents ==
- Solar heating check valve and flow indicator (US 4474209)
- Orthopedic Pillow (D306245)
