= Roberto Casas =

American politician

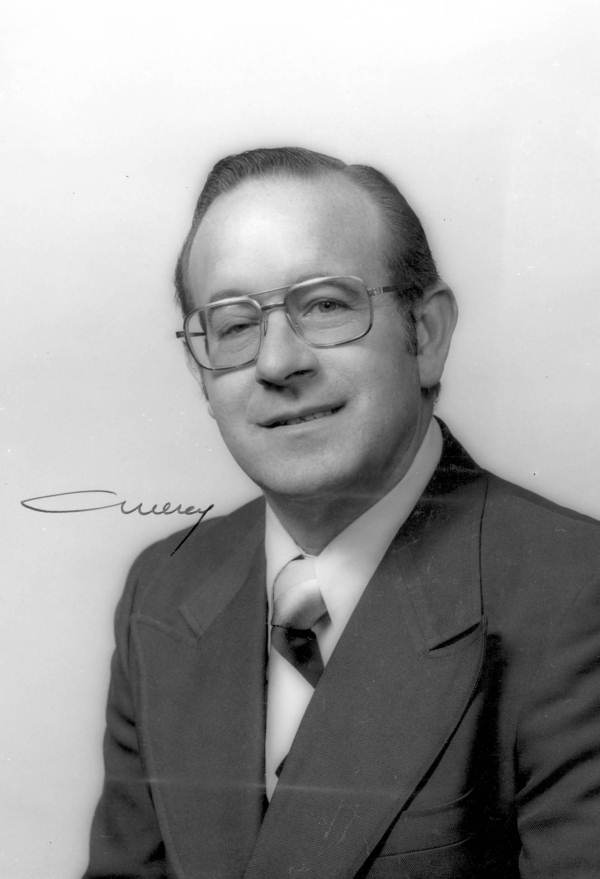

Member of the Florida Senate
- In office 1988–2000

Member of the Florida House of Representatives for District 111
- In office 1982–1988

Personal details
- Born: April 25, 1931 Havana, Cuba
- Died: December 16, 2021 (aged 90)
- Party: Republican
- Spouse: Violeta
- Occupation: Investor, Real Estate Broker

Roberto Casas (April 25, 1931 - December 16, 2021) was a Cuban-born American former politician in the U.S. state of Florida.

He served in the Florida House of Representatives for the 111th district from 1982 to 1988, as a Republican. He also served in the Florida State Senate from 1988 to 2000.

In 2000, he unsuccessfully challenged incumbent Natacha Seijas for her seat on the Miami-Dade County Board of Commissioners.

A park in Hialeah Florida, is named after him.
