= Raúl L. Martínez =

American politician

Raúl Martínez
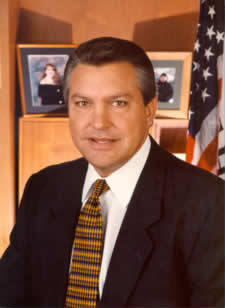

Mayor of Hialeah
- In office 1993–2005
- Preceded by: Julio Martinez (acting)
- Succeeded by: Julio Robaina
- In office 1981–1991
- Preceded by: Dale Bennett
- Succeeded by: Julio Martinez (acting)

Personal details
- Born: March 6, 1949 (age 77) Santiago de Cuba, Cuba
- Party: Democratic
- Spouse: Ángela Callava
- Children: 2
- Education: Miami Dade College (AA); Florida International University (BS)

Raúl L. Martínez (born March 6, 1949, in Santiago de Cuba, Cuba) is a former mayor of Hialeah, Florida, United States. He is a Democrat and was mayor for 24 years, first elected in 1981 and was the Democratic congressional candidate for Florida's 21st congressional district in 2008.

== Family ==
Martínez has launched Martínez & Fernández Public Relations in Miami Lakes to provide counsel to a variety of clients in the field of public relations, media relations, government relations, brand management, crisis management and consulting. Martinez and his wife, Ángela Callava, have two children, Aida Martínez-Ruíz and Raul L. Martinez Jr. and three grandchildren, Isabella Sofía Ruíz, Raúl Leonides Martínez III, and Lucas Oliver Martínez.

Martínez is the son of Leonides (Chin) Martínez-Calderín (1925–2007). Chin Martinez was the head of the taxi drivers retirement fund in Cuba during the 1950s, and used his connections to prevent his brother's assassination, Alfredo Martínez Calderín, who then joined Raul Castro in the II Frente Oriental Frank País. Alfredo's son, Rubén Martínez Puente, is presently a general in the Cuban Army and responsible for the shooting down of American airplanes in international waters

== Early years and schooling ==
Martínez arrived in the United States in May 1960 and has been a resident of Hialeah since 1969. He graduated from Miami Senior High School. He received an Associate in Arts Degree from Miami-Dade College (then known as Miami Dade Junior College and later named Miami Dade Community College) and received his Bachelor of Science Degree in Criminal Justice from Florida International University.

== Public service ==
Martínez began his public service career in 1971 as a member of Hialeah's Minority Group Housing Committee. In 1976 he was appointed to the Personnel Board and later in 1977 elected to the Hialeah City Council. In 1981, Martínez was elected mayor and re-elected in 1983. In 1985 he became the first Hialeah mayor in 44 years to run unopposed. He was re-elected in 1987 and in 1989 he was elected to a four-year term.

In 1993, Martínez won re-election by 273 votes, because of a 2 to 1 margin amongst absentee ballots. The election was thrown out by a state judge who ruled that "overzealous" and "unscrupulous" campaign workers forged so many absentee ballots as to taint the entire vote. Martínez won a special election that was called in 1994. Martinez was again re-elected mayor in 1997 and 2001 where for the second time in his career ran unopposed. He has run and won 9 times as Mayor of Hialeah.

Martínez has received numerous gubernatorial appointments, amongst them the Florida State Commission on Hispanic Affairs from 1979 to 1982, where he was elected Chairman in 1981, and on the Governor's Commission on the Statewide Prosecutor's Function from 1984 to 1985. In 1985, he was appointed by then Governor Bob Graham to the Democratic Policy Commission's Roundtable on Defense and Foreign Policy, as well as to the State Comprehensive Planning Committee.

Martínez is a past president of the Dade County League of Cities, the Florida League of Cities and served on the board of directors of the National League of Cities. He is chairman of the South Florida Employment and Training Consortium and was the founding vice-chairman of the Beacon Council, a Miami-Dade County development agency composed of public and private sector leaders. The Mayor also served on the High Speed Rail Franchise and Environmental Review Committee.

In 2004, he was the Parliamentarian to the 2004 Democratic Convention in Boston.

On December 13, 2005, Hialeah City Hall was renamed the "Raul L. Martinez Government Center" in recognition to his 24 years as mayor and 4 years as a councilman.

In 2007, the Republican-controlled Florida legislature renamed 49 Street in Hialeah as "Mayor Raúl L. Martínez Street".

== Trials ==
In 1989, Martínez was expected to run against State Senator Ileana Ros-Lehtinen in Florida's 18th congressional district, left vacant after the death of Claude Pepper. State Senator Ros-Lehtinen's husband, Dexter Lehtinen, the acting US Attorney for South Florida initiated an investigation on alleged accusations of extortion and racketeering. In 1990, he presented his findings to a grand jury that indicted Martinez on eight charges of extortion and racketeering.

The indictment led to Martínez's suspension from office and trial. In July 1991, Martinez was convicted for six counts of conspiracy, extortion and racketeering and sentenced to 10 years in prison. Martinez appealed the decision and the appellate judges ordered a new trial in 1994, citing" flawed jury instructions and blatant jury misconduct". The mayor's second trial ended March 26, 1996, in a hung jury. And the third trial, which began April 22, 1996, resulted in an acquittal on one count of extortion and deadlocked on five remaining counts (by a vote of 11 to 1 in favor of an acquittal).

The U.S. Attorney at that time, Kendall Coffey, (a Clinton appointee who was confirmed by a Republican U.S. Senate) ultimately dropped the remaining five charges. The Clinton Justice Department then opened a case against Mr. Lehtinen on charges of "misconduct" and potential conflicts of interest for investigating "a potential political rival of his wife." Mr. Lehtinen resigned his position as US Attorney.

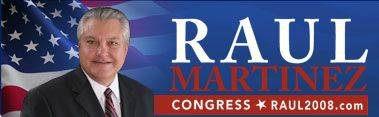
Raul Martinez 2008 Congressional election banner

== Congressional election 2008 ==
On January 21, 2008, Martínez announced on the America TeVe show A Mano Limpia his intention to run in the November 2008 election for the Florida 21st congressional district seat held by Republican Lincoln Díaz-Balart. Martinez officially announced his candidacy the following day at the Raul L. Martinez Government Center (Hialeah City Hall). Martinez lost to Díaz-Balart, garnering 42% of the vote.

== Controversies ==
In June 1999, during a protest of more than 400 people blocking an expressway in Hialeah, the city's then police chief, Rolando Bolanos, was hit in the head with a rock. Bolanos called Martínez to the scene and, during the battle, Martinez punched a butcher, Ernesto Mirabal. Mirabal was charged with battery on an elected official, resisting arrest with violence and inciting a riot. The charges against Mirabal were later dropped.

In February 2007, when a "caustic" press release from Florida Republican Party Chairman Jim Greer criticized Hillary Clinton's presence at a fundraiser at the ex-mayor's home, Martinez responded by using profane language.

== Footnotes ==
- Progresso Weekly article
- The Miami Herald article "Battle of the Titans: Martinez vs. Díaz-Balart"
- Alfonso Chardy & Laura Figueroa (January 23, 2008) "Congressional candidates Martinez, Díaz-Balart start swinging", The Miami Herald
- The Miami Herald; "Losing Castro Will Redefine Cubans' Issues" by Ana Menéndez, January 23, 2008, page 1B
- The Miami Herald; "Martinez Should Run" by Alonso R. del Portillo, January 19, 2008, page 26A
- The Miami Herald; "Neither Lehtinen nor Ros Lehtinen responded to Herald phone calls for comment", January 21, 2008
- The Miami Herald; "Timing of investigation raises questions about 'the motivation of the prosecution" February 17, 1991
- The Miami Herald; "Lehtinen declined to comment about the timing of the investigation", February 17, 1991
- The Miami Herald; "Lehtinen wanted to neutralize Martínez as a political rival of his wife, Ileana Ros-Lehtinen" February 15, 1991
- The Miami Herald; "Justice Investigating Miami U.S. Attorney for Misconduct", April 20, 1990
- The Miami Herald; "Martinez insists he is not interested in changing the four-decades' old embargo against Cuba", January 21, 2008
- El Nuevo Herald; "The embargo should not be modified in any way - Raul Martinez", January 21, 2008
- Maria Elvira Live: show on Mega TV, January 15, 2008; "It's very troubling that the congressman of that district (Lincoln Díaz-Balart) gets his news on Cuba from El Granma."
