= Julio Robaina =

American politician (born 1965)

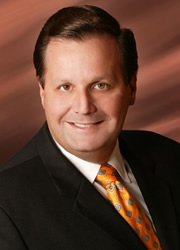

Mayor of Hialeah
- In office December 2005 – May 23, 2011
- Preceded by: Raúl L. Martínez
- Succeeded by: Carlos Hernández

Personal details
- Born: April 21, 1965 (age 61) Newark, New Jersey, U.S.
- Party: Republican

Julio Robaina (born April 21, 1965) is an American politician who served as the mayor of Hialeah, Florida. He was first elected in 2005 and was re-elected for a second term in 2009. Robaina also served as Hialeah's city manager, with a total annual compensation for both positions, including expenses and travel, for $261,010.

On April 12, 2011, Robaina announced his intention to resign as Mayor of Hialeah in order to campaign for the office of Mayor of Miami-Dade County. His resignation took effect on May 23, 2011.

On June 28, 2011, Robaina lost the election for Mayor of Miami-Dade County to Carlos A. Giménez.
