= Victor De Yurre =

Member of the Miami City Commission
- In office 1987–1995
- Preceded by: Joe Carollo
- Succeeded by: Joe Carollo
- Constituency: 2nd at-large seat

Vice Mayor of Miami
- In office December 1992–November 1993
- Mayor: Xavier Suarez
- Preceded by: Miriam Alonso
- Succeeded by: Miller Dawkins
- In office December 1988–November 1989
- Mayor: Xavier Suarez
- Preceded by: Rosario Kennedy
- Succeeded by: Miller Dawkins

Personal details
- Relatives: Victor De Yurre Sr. (father)
- Education: University of Miami (BAA); St. Mary's University School of Law (JD); University of Miami School of Law (ML)

Victor H. De Yurre is an American lawyer and politician who served as a member of the Miami City Commission for two terms.

== Family, education, and early career ==
De Yurre is Cuban American. He is the son of Victor De Yurre Sr., who served as mayor of Havana, Cuba.

De Yurre received a Bachelor of Business Administration (BBA) degree in accounting from the University of Miami. He received a Juris Doctor (JD) from St. Mary's University School of Law, and also received a Master of Laws (ML) in Taxation from the University of Miami School of Law.

De Yurre's career began as a traffic court officer in Florida. After approximately one-and-a-half years, he founded his own law firm circa 1977: the Law Office of Victor H. De Yurre.

== Miami City Commission (1987–95) ==
In 1985, De Yurre unsuccessfully ran for Miami City Commission (city council), challenging incumbent commissioner Miller Dawkins (the only black incumbent on the commission, at the time).

Two years after his first campaign, De Yurre was elected to the city commission in 1987, unseating incumbent member Joe Carollo by a broad margin. He was only 34 years old when elected. The race was described in The Miami Herald as "the fiercest, most expensive campaign" in Miami that year.

De Yurre was re-elected to a second term in 1991.

In 1989, and 1993, De Yurre served as the city's vice mayor.

De Yurre's tenure on the commission was tarnished by several criminal investigations into alleged misconduct. In May 1989, a federal probe into De Yurre was publicized investigating whether he had failed to properly disclose a series of loans he received from numerous banks in order to finance the purchase of a house in Miami's Coconut Grove neighborhood. Later in 1989, he faced investigations into his ties to developer Leonel Martinez. Martinez who had been arrested for attempting to smuggle the drugs cocaine and cannabis in South Florida. De Yurre, who was Martinez's real estate agent, insisted that Martinez was no more than a real estate client of his. In May 1992, the FBI investigated an alleged misuse of campaign finances by De Yurre during his 1991 re-election. De Yurre initially blamed the allegations on a city official, but ultimately admitted that he would be unable to account for approximately $290,000 in campaign funds. De Yurre would face other publicized allegations of improprieties in regards to campaign finances during his second term on the commission, which further tarnished his reputation.

De Yurre held animus against Miriam Alonso, another prominent Cuban-American resident of Miami. This animus grew ever more intense after Alonso won a seat on the city commission in 1989. The two rivals regularly jockeyed against each other to assert themselves as the dominant voice for the Cuban community on the council. The two regularly criticized each other to the press. Staffers for the two commissioners were also frequently combative with the other camp. De Yurre explored running in the 1993 Miami mayoral election, but ultimately abandoned his bid. However, with Alonso being a candidate, De Yurre involved himself in the mayor's race by seeking to sabotage her chances. He unsuccessfully attempted to persuade Arthur Teele to publicly position himself against Alonso's mayoral bid by endorsing Stephen P. Clark, but Alonso ultimately persuaded Teele to endorse her.

In 1995, De Yurre ran for a third term on the city commission, but was unseated by Carollo.

== Subsequent career ==
After losing re-election, De Yurre returned to working full time at his commercial law firm.

In 2012, De Yurre ran for a judgeship on the Eleventh Circuit Court of Florida. He secured a strong amount of fundraising for his campaign. Ultimately, he received only 43.6% of the vote and lost to opponent Teresa Mary Pooler.
