= Joe Carollo =

Cuban-American politician

- Official mayoral portrait photograph, circa 1996

38th and 40th Mayor of Miami
- In office March 12, 1998 – November 11, 2001
- Preceded by: Xavier Suarez
- Succeeded by: Manny Diaz
- In office July 24, 1996 – November 14, 1997
- Preceded by: Stephen P. Clark; Willy Gort (acting)
- Succeeded by: Xavier Suarez

Member of the Miami City Commission
- In office December 2, 2017 – December 10, 2025
- Preceded by: Frank Carollo
- Succeeded by: Rolando Escalona
- Constituency: 3rd district
- In office 1995 – July 1996
- Preceded by: Victor De Yurre
- Succeeded by: Tomás Regalado
- Constituency: 2nd at-large seat
- In office 1979–1987
- Succeeded by: Victor de Yurre
- Constituency: 2nd at-large seat

Vice Mayor of Miami
- In office December 13, 1984–November 25, 1985
- Mayor: Maurice Ferré
- Preceded by: Demetrio Perez Jr.
- Succeeded by: Miller Dawkins
- In office November 12, 1981–November 3, 1982
- Mayor: Maurice Ferré
- Preceded by: Theodore Gibson
- Succeeded by: J. L. Plummer

City Manager of Doral
- In office June 21, 2017
- Preceded by: Edward Rojas
- Succeeded by: Edward Rojas
- In office January 9, 2013 – April 21, 2014
- Appointed by: Luigi Boria
- Preceded by: Yvonne Soler-McKinley; Merrett R. Stierheim (acting)
- Succeeded by: Edward Rojas

Personal details
- Born: Joseph Xavier Carollo; March 12, 1955 (age 71) Caibarién, Cuba
- Party: Republican
- Spouse(s): Karen Chestnut (div.); Mari Ledon (div.); Marjorie
- Children: 4
- Relatives: Frank Carollo (brother)
- Education: Florida International University

Joseph Xavier Carollo (born March 12, 1955) is a Cuban-American politician who served as mayor of Miami from 1996 to 1997 and again from 1998 to 2001. Following his loss in the 2001 mayoral election, he served as Doral, Florida city manager from January 2013 until his firing in April 2014. After a lawsuit by Carollo, he was reinstated as city manager in June 2017, before immediately resigning. He successfully ran for election to the Miami City Commission in 2017. He was a candidate in the 2025 Miami mayoral election.

Carollo's combative and erratic behavior in his political career earned him the name "Crazy Joe" from Miami Herald journalist and author Carl Hiaasen. The Miami New Times similarly called him "Loco Joe."

== Early life, education and early career ==
Carollo was born in Caibarién, Cuba.

At the age of 18, Carollo became the youngest police officer in the state of Florida. In 1979, as a police officer, he was reprimanded for putting Ku Klux Klan cartoon pamphlets in the locker of a fellow Black officer. He soon after quit the police force. His early career also included work as a security guard, and as a campus police officer at Florida International University (FIU).

Carollo received two bachelor degrees from FIU, one in criminal justice and another in international relations.

During the 1976 Democratic presidential primaries, Carollo (at the age of 20) supported the candidacy of George Wallace, the segregationist governor of Alabama. That same year, Carollo also worked as a campaign aide to John Grady, a right wing candidate in the Republican Party's primary election in Florida's election for United States Senate. Grady was a leader of the John Birch Society, which was considered an ultra-right wing group, and had previously had run for senate in 1974 as the American Independent Party's nominee in Florida. Carollo would later reflect that his work on Grady's campaign played a pivotal role in recognizing that he felt his own politics most aligned with the Republican Party, believing that his strong anti-communist sentiments were most at home in the Republican Party.

== First tenure on the Miami City Commission (1979–87) ==
In 1977, at the age of 22, Carollo ran unsuccessfully for the Miami City Commission, challenging Theodore Gibson. In his campaign, he positioned himself as vehemently anti-communist and spoke of his desire to represent the city's rising Cuban population. He regularly appeared on Spanish-language radio, calling himself "Jose" in those appearances. He lost this campaign, but learned enough to have more success two year later.

In 1979, Carollo was elected to the Miami City Commission at the age of 24, He was the youngest member that had ever been elected to the commission. defeating Demetrio Perez Jr. Carollo was elected to hold the 2nd at-large seat on the commission. Both Carollo and Perez were Cuban-American. Carollo was regarded to have run a campaign more appealing to Latin American voters, aligning himself with city's Latin-American political establishment political figures, such as Mayor Maurice Ferré. Perez had run a campaign that was more appealing to black voters, which had received endorsements from figures such as U.S. Congresswoman Carrie Meek and former city commission M. Athalie Range.

In 1982 and 1985, Carolllo served as vice mayor, a position held by one of the city's five commissioners tasked with setting policies for the city manager to follow.

=== Political feuding ===
Carollo quickly gained a reputation for making enemies, frequently battling with others in Miami government. A 2017 Miami Herald article would later say of Carollo's combative approach to politics, "he built a political career destroying opponents."

Carollo's combative and erratic behavior in his political career earned him the name "Crazy Joe" from noted Miami Herald journalist and author Carl Hiaasen. This name was popular among his critics. The Miami New Times similarly called him "Loco Joe."

It became clear from the start of his tenure on the City Commission, that Carollo was independent of other politicians in the city and willing to be combative with them. In his first meeting as a commissioner, he voted six times against Mayor Ferré's preferred positions. This was despite Ferré having endorsed his election. After the meeting, Ferré publicly characterized Carollo as "out of control". Carollo and Ferré frequently fought with each other. Their negative relationship heightened in 1983, after Ferré had made what he initially thought was a successful overture to make peace. Carollo promised to give Ferré his endorsement in the 1983 mayoral election, in which Ferré was being challenged by Xavier Suarez. At the public event in which Carollo was expected to deliver his endorsement, Carollo instead blindsided Ferré and delivered remarks lambasting him with a tirade of accusations. Among accusations he lodged was that Ferré (a Puerto Rican) was anti-Cuban. Ferré won the election. Carollo's 1983 "double cross" of Ferré remains a memorable moment in Carollo's political career.

Carollo and the city's police chief, Kenneth Harms, fought with each other. Carollo called Harms a "two-bit punk", and publicly accused Harms of harboring agents of the Fidel Castro government of Cuba within the ranks of the city's police department. In 1982, Harms sent a memo accusing Carollo of seeking political favors for Sheik Mohammed Al-Fassi, bribing the police, seeking career favors for his friends on the police force, and enforcing these demands by withholding budget funds for the police.

While Carollo had originally played a role in facilitating the appointment of Howard Gary as Miami's city manager, after Gary took office Carollo fought with him relentlessly and played a role in pressuring the controversial firing of Gary (the city's first black city manager). The ousting of Gary particularly angered black residents.

Carollo also acted as a frequent adversary to Xavier Suarez. In 1985, after mayor-elect Suarez (elected in the 1985 mayoral election) had had success in electing a slate of candidates promising reform, Suarez promised that he would cooperate with the new mayor and his council allies rather than be combative with them. This promise, however, was not honored. In 1987, Mayor Suarez (in a speech as a fundraiser for his mayoral re-election campaign) said of Carollo "He's really kind of an embarrassment to those people who really are fighting communism and giving their lives and their talents and their time and their money, and in the halls of the U.S. Congress, and in South America and Africa they sometimes give their lives. In fact I think he's an all-around embarrassment."

=== Anti-communism ===
Carollo frequently postured against communism. He blocked a Sister Cities convention from being hosted in the city, citing opposition to the fact that it would include delegates from communist nations. In 1987, Carollo and several other city officials traveled on an eight-day city-funded trip to Miami's new sister city of Kaohsiung, Taiwan.

In 1986, Carollo attacked a plan to build a major waterfront development on Watson Island by alleging it was funded by communists. This was despite plan being backed by several conservative leaders, such as former U. S. Ambassador Jeane Kirkpatrick, conservative anti-Castro lobbyist Jorge Mas Canosa, and then-mayor Xavier Suarez. In support of this accusation, Carollo cited a revelation that one investor in the project had previous business in a communist country. Carollo's vocal opposition helped kill the planned development.

=== Operation of private security firm, allegations of impropriety ===
Art the time, city commissioners were paid a government salary of only $5,000 annually. Carollo founded a private security firm named Genesis Security Services. Several journalistic investigations by the Miami Herald highlighted that many of his strongest consumers were individuals that had business with the city.

Carollo faced an investigation into allegations that he pressured city contractors to do business with his private security firm. He was never prosecuted, however. He was also accused of giving a key to the city to a wealthy Middle East oil sheik in an effort to receive a contract from the businessman for his security firm.

=== "Carollo amendment" ===
The titular "Carollo amendment" required agreements leasing city property to be subject to voter approval (through ballot measures).

=== Re-election defeat in 1987 ===
Carollo floated a possible run in the 1987 city mayoral election before shying away after polls indicated he would receive little support. He instead sought re-election for a third term in his seat on the city commission. He lost re-election, being defeated by lawyer Victor De Yurre, losing by a broad margin in a runoff election. Leading black figures in the city's politics had come out in opposition to Carollo's re-election, as had Mayor Suarez, the Cuban American National Foundation, the Latin Builders Association, and the editorial board of the Miami Herald.

In the first round of the election, Carollo placed second behind De Yurre, with the third-place candidate (school administrator and activist Bill Perry) fell only 5% shy of outperforming Carollo (which would have eliminated Carollo before the runoff). Perry had previously run against Carollo four years earlier. The Miami Herald wrote that, in the first round, "Black and Anglo voters teamed up against Carollo, but scattered their votes among seven challengers," with the divided vote enabling a politically-weakened Carollo to still advance to a runoff. The newspaper described the race as "the fiercest, most expensive campaign" in Miami that year, as well as the "toughest campaign of [Carollo's] 10-year political career", leaving Carollo both exhausted and with a runoff still to campaign for. Analysis of voter behavior in the election indicated that, in the runoff, De Yurre won a majority of the hispanic vote for the seat, and won even more strongly among non-hispanic voters (evidently winning 80% of the non-hispanic participating electorate).

== Political wilderness; founding of Stone Crab King company; unsuccessful 1987 and 1993 pursuits of office ==
For much of the next eight years after losing re-election, Carollo was considered to be in "political exile", and was regarded by numerous political pundits to be a "has been".

After he left government, his security business lost customers. Political opponents alleged this was because city government influence peddling had been driving business when he was in office, while Carollo alleged this was untrue and that he lost business because prior investigations into his business (which he alleged were driven by his political rivals) had spooked customers away. Carollo turned to new work in the private sector, including owning and operating restaurants. Recalling the high Asian-market demand for seafood he noticed during his 1987 trip to Taiwan, Carollo founded the Stone Crab Company. This company purchased crabs and other seafood delicacies at cheap prices from nations in Latin America and exported them to Japan and other Far Eastern nations at a profit.

Carollo first unsuccessfully sought to regain office in 1989. In 1993, Carollo made two unsuccessful efforts to regain political office. He first sought a newly-created seat on the Miami–Dade County Commission, but was defeated by former mayor Ferré. During the campaign, Corollo accused Ferré of impropriety, falsely purporting that documents Carollo provided to reporters evidenced that Ferré had been indicted by a grand jury for violation of election law. Later in 1993, Carollo unsuccessfully ran for a seat on the Miami City Commission. Pundits noted that he had campaigned with a far less combative attitude than he had exhibited in his earlier tenure on the commission, but that memory of his first tenure persisted in voters' minds. Six others ran for the seat, including Willy Gort (who won). Gort received the Miami Herald editorial board's endorsement, but the editorial board did not that it believed that Carollo had made personal improvement during his years out of office and that the ditorial board might have endorsed him "against a less-qualified opponent [than Gort]".

== Second tenure on the Miami City Commission (1995–96) ==
Eight years after being unseated, in 1995, Joe Carollo beat De Yurre to retake his seat on the Miami City Commission. De Yurre had faced controversies during his own two terms, including various federal investigations into possible financial crimes. The Miami Herald editorial board initially endorsed Humberto Hernandez in the election, but after some allegations of possible impropriety were surfaced against Hernandez they shifted their endorsement to Carollo. In the first round of the election, Carollo led the vote. De Yurre narrowly surpassed Hernandez's vote share in order to advance to the runoff election. Ahead of the runoff, Carollo received heavy amounts of contributions. Carollo highlighted De Yurre's representation of several drug dealers as a lawyer., and the race turned incredibly ugly. Carollo was able to, for the first time in his political career, receive significant backing from black voters, with Miller Dawkins (the city commission's sole black commissioner) and Art Teele (a black member of the Metro Dade Commission) endorsing him against De Yurre in literature which read, "Corollo [sic] is not great, but we must demand respect! Let's change City Hall". Carollo won 63% of the vote in the runoff.

During his second tenure as a commission, Carollo faced accusations (including in a May 1996 article published in the Miami Herald) that he was behaving erratic, with critics alleging that cracks were forming in the image of a reformed more calm individual he had presented while campaigning. Carollo responded to the May article by rhetorically asking, "how often does The Herald print a rumor proven not to be true?" Carollo was working to mend former political feuds, including making momentary peace with his past rivals Ferré and Suarez.

=== Opposition to Melreese Golf Course management deal ===
The first major splash Carollo made after his return to the city commission was to object vociferously to a proposed deal for the city to sell a 340-year lease of the city-owned Melreese Golf Course to a politically-connected group of buyers. The agreement would have given the group a lucrative lease and a payment of $3.9 million in exchange for the group managing and redeveloping the golf course. Carollo assailed this as a "sweetheart deal" for the group that had been facilitated by the government burying earlier the requests for proposals in low-circulation newspapers, with a description of requirements that would discourage all major existing Florida golf course contractors from placing competing bids.

Carollo also alleged that the deal required voter approval under the existing Carollo amendment, because it was effectively a lease of city property. However, City Manager Cesar Odio argued that it was a management contract and not a land lease, and therefore the deal did not require voter approval. The deal was passed by the city commission by a vote of 3–2, with Mayor Stephen P. Clark (the tie-breaker vote) joining Commissioners Gort and J.L. Plummer in voting in favor, while Carollo and Commissioner Dawkins voted in opposition. Carollo accepted this defeat quietly after the votes were cast, rather than lambasting the deal further.

=== Head of the Miami Sports and Exhibition Authority ===
De Yurre had, as city commissioner, served as the head of the Miami Sports and Exhibition Authority. At his first meeting being returned to the city commission, Carollo was appointed to the now-vacant post. Carollo came into conflict with other members of the commission, alleging that the agency's budget suffered from cronyism and excessive spending. Among others, Carollo came into conflict with the agency's executive director, Chris Korge. Carollo ousted a number of individuals from the authority, including many who were considered allies of Mayor Clark.

Carollo believed that it was necessary for a new arena to replace to Miami Arena to be negotiated with the Miami Heat as well as the Florida Panthers in order to prevent the teams from leaving the city, something he argued Korge had been reticent to initiate talks about at the peril of losing the team. Carollo involved Knight Ridder newspapers businessman Tony Ridder in talks. Ridder had been privately advocating to keep the team in the city. The construction of a new downtown arena was not popular among voters, as the existing arena was less than a decade old. However, Carollo believed that losing the Heat would be more problematic than any backlash over controversy of a deal for a new arena. Ultimately, deadlines set by the Broward County Commission resulted in the Panthers agreeing to a deal to move to suburban Broward County, while the Miami Heat were persuaded by a pledge of a $200 million downtown arena to remain in the city of Miami.

== Mayoralties ==
Between 1996 and 2001, Carollo served two stints as mayor of Miami, the first from 1996 to 1997 and the second from 1998 to 2001. As with his earlier time on the city commission, he was considered a polarizing figure while mayor.

=== First mayoralty (1996–97) ===
==== 1996 election ====
Less than one year after rejoining the City Commission, Carollo won a special election to fill the mayoral vacancy left after Mayor Clark died of cancer. By early 1996, it had been widely known that Mayor Steve C. Clark was dying of cancer. Rumors emerged that Carollo, who had been undertaking many public appearances across the city resembling those of a candidate for mayor, was already gearing up to run in the instance of a special election to fill his seat. However, he refused to validate these rumors, and argued that these public appearances were "just grass-roots work that any good official should do. After Clark's death on June 4, 1996, Carollo attended the funeral. However, Clark's widow was upset at Carollo over his recent political battle with her late husband regarding the golf course management deal, as well as his removal of several of her husband's allies from the sports authority. Carollo was asked to leave the funeral, and complied with this request.

Carollo announced his candidacy for mayor several days after Clark's funeral. The campaign for mayor, triggered by Clark's death, was short and attracted no other major names. Despite being a controversial figure in the city's politics, Corollo was widely regarded as an all-but-certain winner prior to vote due to the lack of any substantial challenger and Carollo's heavy name recognition. Carollo received nearly 76% of the vote, with the runner-up receiving nearly 11%. He became the city's second mayor of Cuban descent (the first having been Suarez).

==== Aftermath of Operation Greenpalm; government fiscal crisis recovery plan ====
Not long after the start of Carollo's first mayoralty, the city's politics was shaken after several city commissioners and others were arrested in Operation Greenpalm, an FBI-led bribery sting during which it came to light that the City of Miami was $68 million in debt. Among those indicted and removed from office by the sting was a key political adversary of Carollo's: City Manager Cesar Odio (whom Carollo had already been attempting to oust). Others indicted include City Commissioner Dawkins. Separately from this, Commissioner Humberto Hernandez –another adversary of Carollo's– was ousted after an FBI investigation led to his indictment for money laundering.

The revelations of the Operation Greenpalm probe left Carollo with a $70 million government budget shortfall to address. Carollo brought in Merritt Stierheim as interim city manager to create a recovery plan. While the city faced scrutiny from Governor Lawton Chiles, reduced bond ratings from Moody, and calls to dissolve the city government, Stierheim’s plan was approved by the city commission. In December 1996, Governor Lawton Chiles established a five-member financial oversight board to oversee the implementation of the city's recovery plan, a move that Carollo strongly supported. However, after the board's creation, Carollo and the board regularly fought over measures recommended by the board. In 2001, the Miami Herald praised Carollo's work as mayor towards remedying a crisis the city government had faced in its finances.

==== Sports arena deal ====
Carollo (left) shakes hands with County Mayor Alex Penelas in October 1997 after the signing of an agreement related to the arena projection

1999 press event at the then-under construction American Airlines Arena, L—R: Maria Teresa Larios, County Mayor Penelas, Miami Heat owner Micky Arison, Quintin Larios (restauranteur), Carollo, Miami Heat president and head coach Pat Riley

Other challenges that Carollo dealt with included continuing work to persuade the Miami Heat team against leaving the city, negotiating with the team and County Mayor Alex Penelas to finalize the deal for the team's new arena. During this, Carollo sued Wayne Huizenga's Miami Panthers team, accusing them of attempting to establish a local sports monopoly and kill the deal for a new downtown arena. After Huizenga won a court decision, Carollo accused the judge of being prejudiced in favor of the Panthers on the basis of the judge holding season tickets to their hockey games. He also, at another point, accused Huizenga of being corrupt.

==== Other matters ====
Lt. Gov. Frank Brogan, Spec. Envoy Buddy MacKay, FL. Sec. of State Katherine Harris, County Mayor Penelas, Carollo, and Luis Laredo at Summit of The Americas at the James L. Knight Center on November 17, 1999

Carollo supported and championed a proposal for the construction of a World Trade Center in the Overtown/Park West areas of the city. He cited the city's role in trade with Latin American and overall world trade as reason for it to construct such a complex. This was a signature issue of his in both his 1996 and 1997 mayoral campaigns.

Carollo faced the challenge of repairing the city's image of corruption, and staving off a growing movement that supported the abolition of a city government and a full city-county consolidation with the Dade County government.

=== 1997 election ===
In 1997, with a referendum to potentially adopt a strong-mayor system also on the ballot, Carollo lost re-election to Xavier Suarez in a runoff election Although Carollo alleged ballot fraud in the first voting round, Suarez took office.

Carollo continued his lawsuit alleging ballot fraud in the first round of voting of the 1997 mayoral race. On March 5, 1998, Thomas S. Wilson Jr., a judge in the Florida circuit court voided the first round of the election writing "this scheme to defraud, literally and figuratively, stole the ballot from the hands of every honest voter in the city of Miami."

A Miami Herald investigation of the mayoral race found that campaign workers for Xavier Suarez and city commissioner Humberto Hernandez were registering voters where they didn't live, punched absentee ballots for voters without permission, casting ballots for voters who did not vote, and signed absentee ballots as witnesses that they did not witness, including for dead people.

=== Second mayoralty (1998–2001) ===
Carollo (center) joins County Mayor Penelas (center left) and other officials in May 1998 to unveil bilingual anti-littering signage for Little Havana

On March 13, 1998, Joe Carollo was sworn in as Miami mayor after the 3rd District Court of Appeals threw out 5,100 fraudulent absentee ballots.

Carollo's second mayorship was marked from the beginning with struggles with the City Commission. After City Commissioner Humberto Hernandez was removed from his office by Governor Lawton Chiles, Carollo fired the City Manager Jose Garcia-Pedroza, who had been appointed by his predecessor, Mayor Xavier Suarez. The City Commission voted to reinstate Garcia-Pedroza and Carollo fired him again, a back-and-forth that led to Garcia-Pedroza being fired three times before asking the City Commission to let his dismissal stand.

==== Miami Circle ====
Real estate developer Michael Baumann tore down an existing apartment building in the summer of 1998 and after being pushed to do a required archaeological survey, discovered an ancient 2,000 year old, 38-foot-wide circle beneath the soil at the mouth of the Miami River. Carollo and the developer first attempted to move the site away from its historical location. Carollo opposed preserving the site as it stood because of the possibility of significant tax revenue from Baumann's planned apartment building. However, Miami-Dade County Mayor Alex Penelas took up the cause of preserving the site after pressure from Native American groups, schoolchildren, archaeologists, the Smithsonian Institution, as well as international scrutiny.

==== 1999 strong mayoralty referendum ====
On Election Day, November 3, 1999, Miami voters voted to change their system of government to a strong-mayor model. As a result, city manager Donald Warshaw was fired and Carollo was forced to run for re-election the following March, effectively cutting his term in half. After the election, Carollo sued to overturn the results of the election, arguing that it constitutes an illegal recall vote.

The results of the election found defenders with City Commissioners Arthur Teele, Tomás Regalado, and Joe Sanchez, whose attorneys asked the Florida Supreme Court to intervene so they could begin to plan and advertise the March election. When the Florida Supreme Court refused to intervene, Carollo successfully defended his seat against the election results.

==== Elián González affair; ousting of Warshaw as city manager ====
In November 1999, Elián González and his mother, along with other Cuban migrants, left Cuba for the United States. While at sea, their boat failed, and most of the passengers, including González's mother, died. González and two other survivors were rescued at sea by fishermen. After arriving, González's family in Miami sued to retain custody of Elián while his father in Cuba, Juan Miguel González Quintana in Cuba, demanded that Elián be returned to Cuba.

The cause to keep Elián González in the United States was taken up by Miami's Cuban community. On March 29, Miami-Dade County Mayor Alex Penelas held a press conference where he announced that the county police department would not assist federal police in removing Elián González from Little Havana.

At that point Joe Carollo began a media blitz where he appeared on television more than 50 times, including on Rivera Live, Nightline, Hannity. During this media blitz, he also made frequent appearances on Miami-area Spanish-language talk radio station Radio Mambi. Carollo's media appearances garnered local and national derision. He accused Juan Miguel González of child abuse. In the days leading up to the April 21 federal raid, City Manager Donald Warshaw wrote memos saying that Carollo was attempting to direct the police to defend the González's home. After Elián was taken by federal agents and reunited with his father, Carollo was one of the first to say that photos of Elián with his father were faked, and said that any supporters of Elián in Little Havana with guns were agents of Fidel Castro.

Carollo fired City Manager Donald Warshaw, who had not supported Carollo's actions in regulation to the Elián González affair. Subsequently, City of Miami Police Chief William O'Brien resigned. Those protesting this shakeup directed massive loads of banana to Miami City Hall, in reference to negative characterization likening Carollo's leadership to that of a "banana republic". Boxes of bananas were delivered and drivers, and protesters also threw bananas at the building. After firing Warshaw, Carollo successfully appointed Carlos A. Giménez as the new city manager.

=== Domestic violence arrest, political fallout ===
In February 2001, Carollo was arrested on charges of domestic violence against his wife. The charges were dropped by the Office of the Miami-Dade State Attorney after Carollo agreed to take anger management courses. The arrest harmed Carollo's political standing.

Subsequently, in March 2001, Carollo was scheduled to give a key to the city to Marie St. Fleur at a banquet for a local Haitian women's organization. With Haitians being a rising voting bloc in Miami-area politics, Carollo likely saw the event as an opportunity to ingratiate themselves to local Haitians. St. Fleur (a Massachusetts state legislator, and the banquet's featured speaker) was a strong advocate of the cause of combatting domestic violence and protecting women against battery, and spoke at length on the subject (seemingly unaware of the mayor's recent arrest). Carollo left the banquet in the middle of St. Fleur's speech without giving St. Fleur the key to the city. His office later denied his early departure from the banquet was motivated by the content of St. Fleur's speech.

=== 2001 re-election loss ===
Facing a field of nine opponents and the pressure of a public domestic violence scandal, Carollo failed to make the runoff in the November 2001 election for mayor. Outperforming him and advancing to the runoff were former mayor Maurice Ferré and attorney Manny Diaz. Diaz won the runoff.

== Doral city manager (2013–14) ==
After the resignation of Doral City Manager Yvonne Soler-McKinley, Carollo was appointed 3 as city manager without a search being held for a new manager. He was nominated by Mayor Luigi Boria, and was confirmed by the Doral City Council by unanimous vote on January 9, 2013.Interim City Manager Merrett R. Stierheim, who had originally been brought in to lead a search, called the appointment "a terrible decision."

After several months, Carollo and Mayor Boria came into disagreement, with Carollo publicly criticizing Boria in late 2013 over concerns about a real estate project on land owned by Boria's own children. This precipitated a feud between the two. Boria twice attempted to pass motions through the City Council that would fire Carollo. The first attempt failed, but the second attempt succeeded. Fifteen months after he was appointed, Carollo was fired by the City Council in a 3-2 vote on April 21, 2014. According to Vice Mayor Christi Fraga, the firing was motivated by Carollo "[having] escalated to nonsense, untrue allegations, insubordination, intimidation, and bullying by our manager." Carollo had accused several members of the council of taking bribes for votes and predicted his firing in an earlier press conference. The city council members who voted to remove him said that he was creating a toxic work environment leading to high turnover in city staff. Carollo sued the mayor and city council members on first amendment grounds and Florida whistleblower protections. In 2017, Carollo and the city of Doral settled the lawsuit, and as part of the settlement terms Carollo was reinstated as city manager so he could resign. Carollo was reinstated on June 21, 2016, and submitted his formal resignation hours later.

== Third tenure on the Miami City Commission (2017-25) ==
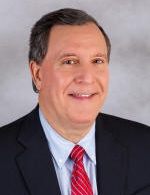
official portrait, 2017

November 21, 2017, Joe Carollo defeated Alfie Leon in a runoff election to take the district 3 seat on the Miami city commission. The seat was presently held by his brother, Frank Carollo, who was term limited. The district represented the neighborhoods and communities of Little Havana, East Shenandoah, West Brickell, as well as parts of Silver Bluff and The Roads. Ahead of the 2017 general campaign, Carollo accused his opponent of being guilty of voter fraud and perjury, and (without providing specifics) alleged that money from the Chavista money was being used to influence his election. He also made vague allegations that a collective of "influence peddlers" were seeking to run the city's government, and that he would thwart them if elected.

A 2017 piece in the Miami New Times opined, "Carollo [is] one of Miami’s most infamous political characters who has somehow kept his political career alive for decades despite acting like a Trumpian lunatic long before [Donald Trump] ever entered politics." A 2025 article published by WLRN-TV observed,

[Carollo's] brash style of governing has kept the city in the headlines for decades and, in recent years, in legal trouble....Known to go on long personal tirades against perceived enemies, Carollo has long been a divisive figure, eliciting intense loyalty from friends and hostility from opponents. But with so much experience in the city, Carollo showed deep knowledge of how the city government operates, and he is known to zero in on tiny line-items in budgeting and to ask probing and revealing questions about city operations and efficiencies. His office has opened new parks around his district and he has championed services for the elderly, who have made up a core part of his base.

Carollo's term ended when he resigned on December 10, 2025.

=== Replacing Viernes Culturales ===
Viernes Culturales (Cultural Fridays) is a festival in the Little Havana neighborhood in Miami held on the last Friday of the month run by a nonprofit made up of area business-owners and community members. In 2018, Carollo applied for permits on the same space and time that would have held Viernes Culturales in a move to force the festival to shut down. Carollo said that he felt the existing event had become "a flea market." One of the Viernes Culturales nonprofit board members, William "Bill" Fuller, said that the actions were taken to attack him personally.

=== Ouster of police chief ===
In March 2021, Mayor Francis Suarez announced that he had recruited and hired Houston police chief Art Acevedo. Acevedo said he would "not tolerate mediocrity at the Miami Police Department", and would make reforms to improve the department. Acevedo quickly began to follow through with high profile firings of police officers starting in June 2021, which brought controversy to his position, and criticism from the Miami City Commission.

Although Art Acevedo won praise from the Cuban community of Miami for standing with them during rallies to support the 2021 Cuban protests, the relationship soured when, in a statement to staff, he referred to a "Cuban mafia" that controlled the Miami Police Department. Carollo criticized him for the statement, calling it "unbelievable," and pointed out that Fidel Castro used the same language to denigrate Cubans in Miami. Carollo expressed disbelief that Acevedo, himself Cuban, could be unaware of that history.

Acevedo accused Carollo (as well as fellow commissioners Alex Díaz de la Portilla and Manolo Reyes) of repeatedly interfering with the affairs of the police department. Carollo ultimately led an effort to oust Acevedo. During a September 2021 hearing on the future of Acevedo as police chief, commissioners aired grievances against Acevedo, including his "Cuban mafia" comments, the firings of popular officers, and the hiring process by the mayor. Carollo brought in a video of Acevedo impersonating Elvis for a fundraiser. Carollo then proceeded to freeze the video and bring attention to Acevedo's crotch, stating "Do you find it acceptable for your police chief to go out in public with pants like that, with his mid-section and pants so tight?"

Art Acevedo was fired by the city manager in October 2021. At the swearing in of his replacement, Manny Morales, Carollo played the theme from the film The Godfather, referencing the "Cuban mafia" statement.

=== Homelessness ordinances ===
In October 2021, Carollo sponsored an ordinance criminalizing tent encampments in the city of Miami. Critics said that the ordinance would criminalize being homeless. Carollo and his supporters say that homelessness is a choice, with Carollo himself saying that the homeless are "people that are out there because they want to be out there."

As a result of this action, the city of Miami was sued by the ACLU of Florida in federal court alleging that the city was destroying the property of residents. The plaintiffs in the case reported city workers destroying personal belongings such as clothing, family photos, identification documents, and an urn containing one plaintiff's mother's ashes.

Carollo also pushed a plan to build an encampment on Virginia Key to keep homeless people. The plan drew sharp criticism from many sectors of Miami, including the Miami-Dade County Homeless Trust, Miami-Dade County Mayor Daniella Levine Cava, advocates for the homeless, area historians, environmentalists, and nearby residents. After vocal disagreement from the Virginia Key Beach Park Trust, which manages the beach due to its history as a Black beach during the Jim Crow era, the city commission took over the board.

=== 2024–23 first amendment lawsuit against Carollo ===
While serving as a commissioner, Carollo was sued by two businessmen for actions he took as commissioner that they felt violated their First Amendment rights. They claimed Carollo "weaponized" the code enforcement department against them and their businesses as a result of them supporting one of his political opponents. Carollo claims he exercised his powers as commissioner properly. In June 2023, a jury found Carollo liable for $15.9 million in compensatory damages and an additional $47.6 million in punitive damages. Carollo says he plans to appeal. November 2023 a Federal court ordered the city of Miami to garnish his wages to pay the $63.5 million judgment against him. In January 2024 a Federal court approved a writ of execution for US Marshals to begin seizing $63.5 million in assets.

=== Other matters ===
In 2023, filmmaker Billy Corben accused Carollo of using "an anti-Semitic dog foghorn" (meaning a non-subtle dog whistle) when Carollo teased him repeatedly using his Jewish birth name instead of his professional name during a tense committee meeting.

== 2025 mayoral campaign ==
On September 20, 2025, Carollo announced that he would be running for mayor in the 2025 election. He promised that he intended for the effort to be his final campaign for public office. Lifetime term limits ratified by voters in a referendum conducingly with the election's first round helped make this pledge more likely to be realized, as Carollo is now barred from being elected to Miami city office. After his defeat in the 2025 election, Carollo re-affirmed his intent to never again run for elected office.

In the lead-up to the election's first round, Carollo was considered one of the six leading candidates in the thirteen-candidate field. Despite being one of the later candidates to file their candidacy (launching his campaign near the last available opportunity to do so), by October he had fundraised more money than any other candidate, with his campaign and political committee raising $712,781 during the third quarter of 2025.

During his campaign, Carollo named housing affordability as the city's most pressing concern, and has also cited public safety and the provision of tutoring to school aged children as key priorities he would have if elected to again serve as mayor.

== Personal life ==
At the age of 21, Carollo married his first wife, Karen Chestnut. Together, they moved into a modest house near Carol Way in Miami. They had two kids, including a son and daughter. In August 1984, they moved to a larger residence in the more prestigious Coconut Grove neighborhood. Within a year, their marriage fractured, and the two ultimately divorced. Their divorce was kept a rather private matter. By the time he ran unsuccessfully for re-election in 1987, he was accompanied by his new partner, Mari Ledon.

In the years between his first and second tenures on the Miami City Commission, Carollo married Ledon and had two daughters with her.

On February 8, 2001, Carollo was arrested on charges of domestic violence. He was accused of throwing a terra cotta pot at his then-wife, leaving a golf ball-sized welt on her head. During the incident, of his daughters had placed a 911 call during the incident, in which she urged urging the emergency operator "help, my dad is hurting my mom! Please come now, please!" while a woman's screams could be heard in the background. The Miami-Dade State Attorney's Office eventually dropped domestic violence charges against Carollo after he agreed to attend anger-management courses. After his marriage to Mari ended, Carollo later remarried to his current wife, Marjorie.

== See also ==
- List of mayors of Miami
- Government of Miami

Political offices
Preceded by Willy Gort	Mayor of Miami; 1996–1997	Succeeded by Xavier Suárez
Preceded by Xavier Suárez	Mayor of Miami; 1998–2001	Succeeded by Manny Díaz
