= Humberto Hernandez Jr. =

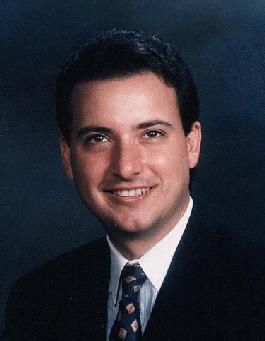
- official portrait photograph, 1997

Member of the Miami City Commission
- In office 1998
- Preceded by: Thelma Gibson
- Succeeded by: Joe Sanchez
- Constituency: 3rd district
- In office 1997
- Preceded by: Richard Dunn
- Succeeded by: Thelma Gibson
- Constituency: 5th at-large seat

Vice Mayor of Miami
- In office 1998
- Preceded by: Tomás Regalado
- Succeeded by: Arthur Teele

Personal details
- Born: June 14, 1962 (age 63) City of Miami
- Occupation: attorney

Humberto Hernandez Jr. (born June 14, 1962) was a City of Miami Commissioner and attorney.

Hernandez, the son of a Bay of Pigs Invasion veteran, was a graduate of Belen Jesuit Preparatory School in Miami in 1980.

In 1995, Hernandez ran for the City of Miami Commission. He lost the runoff election by 55 votes and challenged the election. He lost his challenge the eventual winner was Joe Carollo.

In 1996, a special election was called to fill the position of Mayor of Miami because of the death of Mayor Stephen P. Clark. Joe Carollo resigned his seat to run for mayor and Hernandez decided to run for the Commission again. He lost that election to Tomas Regalado.

In 1997, Commissioner Miller Dawkins resigned his seat and Rev. Richard Dunn was appointed to hold the seat until a new election was called. Hernandez then ran for that position against Rev. Dunn and won that seat and for the first time in 31 years the city of Miami had no “black” commissioner. One of the things promised by Hernandez if he was elected was to replace “at-large” commission seats with “single member” commission seats. The following year, Florida Governor Lawton Chiles suspended Hernandez from the City of Miami Commission because Hernandez was indicted for money laundering and bank fraud. Thelma Gibson, the wife of Theodore Gibson (the first black elected commissioner for the City of Miami), was appointed to fill his seat on the commission.

In 1998, Hernandez ran again for a seat on the City of Miami Commission claiming he was innocent of the federal charges. He won that election with 65.42% of the vote. Yet a few months later he was again suspended from office by Governor Chiles because he was arrested for election fraud. In his trial for the election fraud the court acquitted Hernandez of a felony count of fabricating evidence and a misdemeanor count of conspiracy to fabricate evidence. He was convicted of being an accessory after the fact. He was sentenced to 364 days in prison. He was replaced by Joe Sanchez on the commission. During this time it was revealed that his attorney, Jose Manuel Quinon, was having an affair with his wife of 8 years, Esther M. Ortiz. He tried to have the courts give him a new trial based on the affair but was unsuccessful. He and his wife finally divorced in 1999 (in 2003 Ortiz married Quinon). Hernandez was disbarred by the Florida Supreme Court but is eligible to reapply in 2008.
