= J. L. Plummer =

American politician

- official portrait photograph

Member of the Miami City Commission
- In office October 1970 – December 1999
- Preceded by: Maurice Ferré
- Succeeded by: Johnny Winton
- Constituency: 3rd at-large seat (1970–1997); 2nd district (1997–1999)

Vice Mayor of Miami
- In office December 1994–November 1995
- Mayor: Stephen P. Clark
- Preceded by: Miller Dawkins
- Succeeded by: Willy Gort
- In office December 1990–November 1991
- Mayor: Xavier Suarez
- Preceded by: Miller Dawkins
- Succeeded by: Miriam Alonso
- In office December 1986–November 1987
- Mayor: Xavier Suarez
- Preceded by: Miller Dawkins
- Succeeded by: Rosario Kennedy
- In office November 1982–December 1983
- Mayor: Maurice Ferré
- Preceded by: Joe Carollo
- Succeeded by: Demetrio Perez Jr.
- In office December 1978–December 1979
- Mayor: Maurice Ferré
- Preceded by: Manolo Reboso
- Succeeded by: Armando Lacasa
- In office December 1974–December 1975
- Mayor: Maurice Ferré
- Preceded by: Manolo Reboso
- Succeeded by: Rose Gordon
- In office December 1970–November 1971
- Mayor: David T. Kennedy
- Preceded by: M. Athalie Range
- Succeeded by: Edward T. Graham

Chair of the City of Miami Planning and Zoning Board
- In office August 1967 – August 1968

Member of the City of Miami Planning and Zoning Board
- In office July 1966 – October 1970

Personal details
- Born: December 3, 1936 Victoria Hospital in Miami, Florida
- Died: December 16, 2021 (aged 85) Miami, Florida
- Education: Cincinnati College of Mortuary Science
- Profession: funeral director and funeral home owner

Joseph Lionel Plummer Jr. (December 3, 1936 – December 16, 2021) was an American politician who for 29 years (1970–1999) served as a member of the Miami City Commission (city council). His tenure remains the longest in the commission's history. Before this, he served as a member of the City of Miami Planning and Zoning Board for four years (1966–1970).

Plummer was a professional funeral home director, and held many appointed roles in Miami in addition to his elected city council office. After Maurice Ferré's mayoralty ended in the mid-1980s, Plummer assumed an increased role of major influence in the city's politics.

== Early life, education, professional career ==
Born December 3, 1936, Plummer was a son of J. L. Plummer Sr. (who served as a member of the Dade County School Board) and a brother of Larry Plummer, (who represented the 39th district in the Florida Senate). He was born into the fifth generation of his family to reside in Florida. His great-grandfather, Joseph W. Plummer, served as mayor of Key West in the 19th century.

In 1953, Plummer graduated from Miami Senior High School. In 1957, he graduated from the Cincinnati College of Mortuary Science. At the age 21, he became the youngest person to have (up to that time) ever received a funeral director license in the state of Florida.

Plummer long worked as a funeral director, including as the chairman of the board of the Ahern-Plummer Funeral Homes. He was affiliated with the Independent Funeral Directors of Florida.

== City of Miami Planning and Zoning Board (1966–1970) ==
Plummer served on the City of Miami Planning and Zoning Board from July 1966 until being appointed to a vacant seat on the Miami City Commission in October 1970. He served as chair from August 1967 to August 1967.

== Miami City Commission (1970–1999) ==
Plummer (standing at center left in tan suit) with other officials at the 1999 signing ceremony of a curatorial agreement between the Miami Museum of Science and the Smithsonian Institution

Plummer was appointed to the Miami City Commission in October 1970 to the seat left vacant when Maurice Ferré resigned in order to run for Metro Mayor. He was sworn-in on October 8. In November 1971, he won election to a full four-year term. He was re-elected in 1975, 1979, 1983, 1987, 1991, and 1995. He received his best-yet result in his 1987 re-election, with 65% of the vote. In 1991, he surpassed this and received 80.1% of the vote. For nearly all of his tenure, Plummer represented the 3rd at-large seat. In 1997, the city transitioned to single-member districts, with Plummer representing the newly-drawn 2nd district. Overall, Plummer served eight terms. His 29-year tenure remains the longest in the city commission's history. In November 1999, Plummer lost re-election after 29 years in office. He was defeated by Johnny Winton by a sizable margin

In December 1970, his fellow commissioners voted for him to serve a one year term as the vice mayor. Overall, he served seven stints as vice mayor, serving as vice mayor in 1971, 1975, 1979, 1983, 1987, 1991, and 1995.

Plummer did not support the appointment of César Odio as city manager in early 1985, viewing him as too loyal to then-mayor Maurice Ferré. After Ferré lost re-election that November, and political novice Xavier Suarez became mayor, Odio and Plummer became politically aligned. Plummer also garnered increased influence in city politics after Mayor Ferré departed office.

In his final two years of life, Plummer was honorarily titled "Commissioner Emeritus".

=== Related civic work ===
In March 1986, Plummer was appointed by Governor Bob Graham to the Florida Growth Management Advisory Board. In January and April 1987, also received further appointments to the South Florida Regional Planning Council, Greater Miami Drug Abuse Council, and board of directors of Mercy Hospital Outpatient Center.

Plummer served as chairman of a Super Bowl host committee for an iteration of the game held in Miami. He was also involved in organizing the Grand Prix of Miami. He also served on the board of directors of Sister Cities International. He also served as general chairman of the Budweiser Unlimited Hydroplane Regatta.

Plummer served as chairman of the Downtown Development Authority and the Miami Sports & Exhibition Authority. He also served on the City of Miami Ecology and Environment Committee.

In the 1990s, Plummer served as Chairman of the Miami International Trade Board, and Chairman of the Bayfront Park Management Trust and Advisory Committee member for the Florida Department of Highway Safety and Motor Vehicles.

Plummer was also a board member at the University of Miami/Jackson Memorial Hospital Burn Center. He was also a member of the Dade County Citizens Safety Council and the Dade County Criminal Justice Council.

== Personal life and death ==
Plummer was a longtime resident of the Coconut Grove neighborhood.

Plummer was involved in several fraternal orders. He was the youngest exalted ruler in the history of the Miami Elks Lodge 948, and was the inaugural chairman of the South Florida Elks Cripples Children's Clinic. He was also long a member of the Knights of Columbus, being both a 3rd degree and 4th degree member.

Plummer was also a member of the Syrian Lebanese American Club, the Manatee Bay Club, Fraternal Order of Police, Hispanic Heritage Council, and the A.H.E.P.A.

Plummer died December 16, 2021 in Miami.
