= 2009 Miami mayoral election =

- November 3, 2009

Candidate	Tomás Regalado	Joe Sanchez
Popular vote	27,937	11,128
Percentage	71.51%	28.49%
Mayor before election
Manny Diaz
Nonpartisan
Elected Mayor
Tomás Regalado
Republican

The 2009 Miami mayoral election took place on November 3, 2009. Incumbent Mayor Manny Diaz was term-limited and unable to seek re-election to a third term. Two candidates ran to succeed him: City Commissioner Tomás Regalado and City Commission Chairman Joe Sanchez.

== Candidates ==
- Tomás Regalado, City Commissioner
- Joe Sanchez, City Commission Chairman

== Campaign ==
The candidates sharply differed on the direction of the city, with Sánchez positioning himself as a supporter of outgoing (term limited) mayor Many Diaz's administration, while Regalado positioning himself as an opponent of Diaz's administration, and over the construction of Marlins Park, with Sánchez supporting it and Regalado opposed. Sanchez aligned with Diaz's support support for large development projects in the city. Regalado had been a frequent critic of Diaz and preceding mayors.

Though observers predicted a close race, Regalado defeated Sánchez in a landslide, winning his first term with 72 percent of the vote. Voter turnout was low, and Regalado was regarded to have benefited with dissatisfaction at the poor state of the local economy and a national wave of anti-incumbent sentiment (capitalizing on the perception that Sanchez was tied to Diaz).

In the final weeks of the campaign, Regaldo focused his messaging on lambasting billions of dollars spent on major public works projects in the city (many of which had been backed by both Sanchez and Diaz), characterizing them as an insulting use of money amid high property taxes and increasing unemployment in Miami.

== Results ==
2009 Miami mayoral election results
Candidate	Votes	%
Tomás Regalado	27,937	71.51
Joe Sanchez	11,128	28.49
Total votes	39,065	100
