= Cincinnati College of Mortuary Science =

Private mortuary science college in Ohio, US

Coordinates: 39°12′24″N 84°30′20″W

- School logo
- Type: Private college
- Established: 1882
- Faculty: 12
- Undergraduates: 144
- Location: Cincinnati, Ohio, US
- Campus: Urban/suburban
- Colors: Purple and gold
- Website: www.ccms.edu

Cincinnati College of Mortuary Science (CCMS) is a private mortuary science college in Cincinnati, Ohio. CCMS is the oldest school of its kind in the United States, tracing its history back to the Clarke School, which organized its first class on March 8, 1882. The school was later called the Cincinnati College of Embalming, arriving at the present name in 1966. CCMS offers associate degrees and bachelor's degrees in mortuary science.

== History ==
=== Joseph Henry Clarke ===
During the early periods of embalming in the United States, it became necessary to teach the skills required for new and reliable embalming techniques. To meet the need for training, a man named Joseph Henry Clarke founded a school of embalming at the corner of Park and Sixth Streets in Cincinnati, Ohio. Born November 28, 1840, in Connersville, Indiana, Clarke later would be known as the "father of American embalming schools."

After a period of working in his brother's pharmacy, Clarke studied medicine in Keokuk, Iowa, at about the time the Civil War broke out. Eventually he was permitted by the Union Army to serve in the position of assistant hospital steward in the 5th Iowa Infantry. His brother-in-law, W. Darrow, allowed him to help with amputations and visiting sick wards.

After the war Clarke became a casket salesman for the Whitewater Valley Coffin Company and began to realize the need for better methods of preservation for human bodies. To learn more, he enrolled in an anatomy course taught in Cincinnati by C. M. Lukens at the Pulte Homeopathic Medical College (1873–1910). Together they worked out the ideas for a school of embalming. Their schooling began as a demonstration of newly-developed embalming chemicals along with rudimentary teaching of arterial and venous embalming techniques. The success of their classes was based on what the students could learn as well as the quality of products sold.

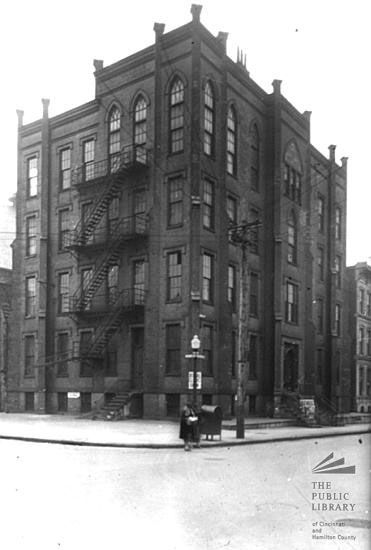
Pulte Medical College

The first class was organized Monday, March 8, 1882, and ended Saturday, March 13, 1882. Six days of intensive training were held in the amphitheater of Pulte Medical College at Seventh and Mound Streets. The original class consisted of seven students.

Following the second class Clarke was financially able to make the school a permanent institution of learning. The second class was organized April 24, 1882, at the Pulte Medical College with ten students. The school gained its first public recognition when a trade paper published the class material. The third class was organized June 6, 1882, with only six students. In addition, the fourth class, organized July 11, contained the same number of students, but it was conducted at Luken's office on Race Street. The fifth class, organized September 19, became the second largest class of that year with sixteen students. The sixth class was the last class of 1882 that was conducted in Cincinnati. It was organized November 7 with four students and was held at the Eclectic Medical College at Court and Plum Streets. To broaden the knowledge of students and to stimulate interest in the school, Professor Clarke and his colleagues traveled to three larger cities. The first stop was Philadelphia, Pennsylvania, on November 22, 1882, where a class was held with fifteen students. It was held in a hallway over a drug store at 11th and Market Streets in Philadelphia.

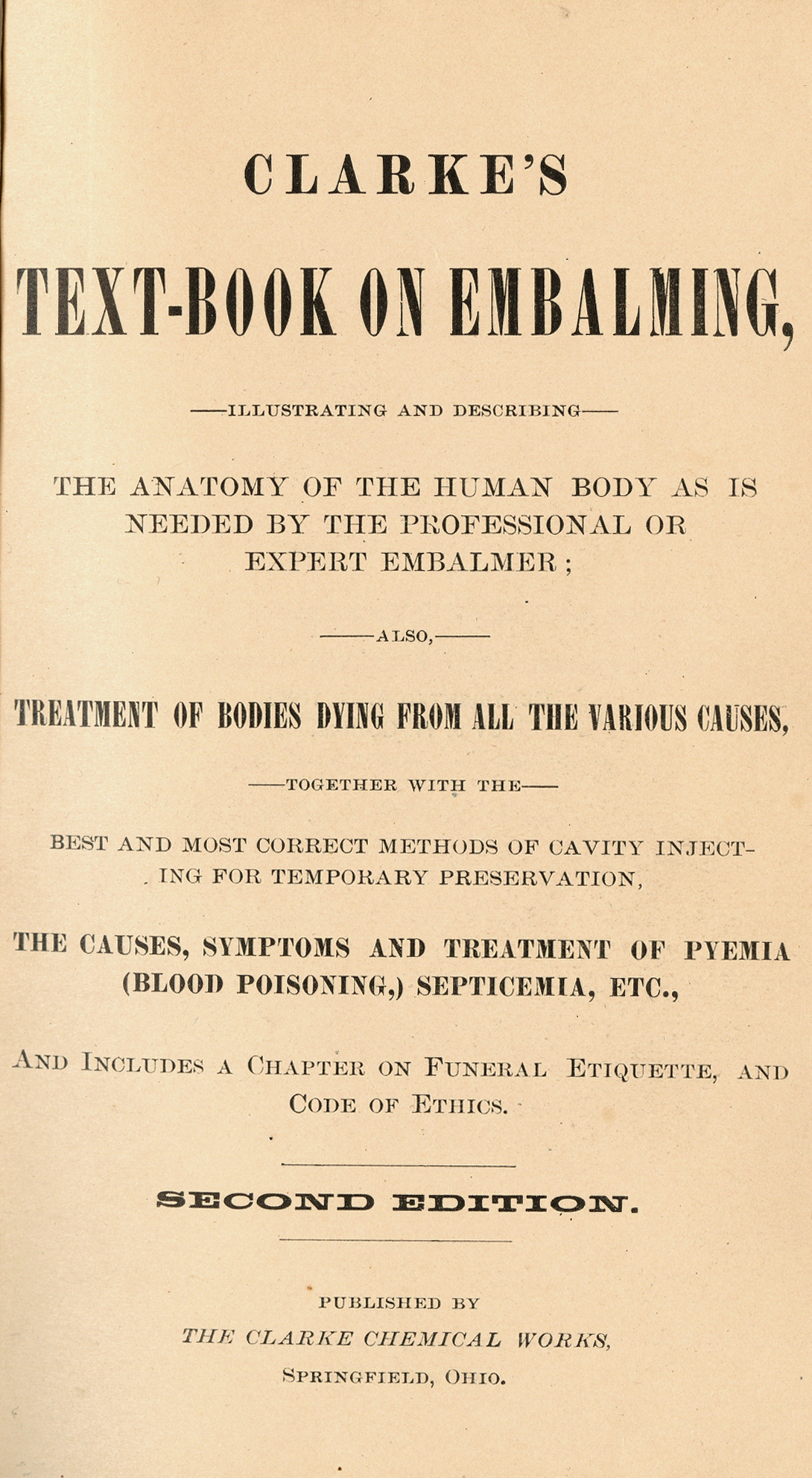
Clarke's Book

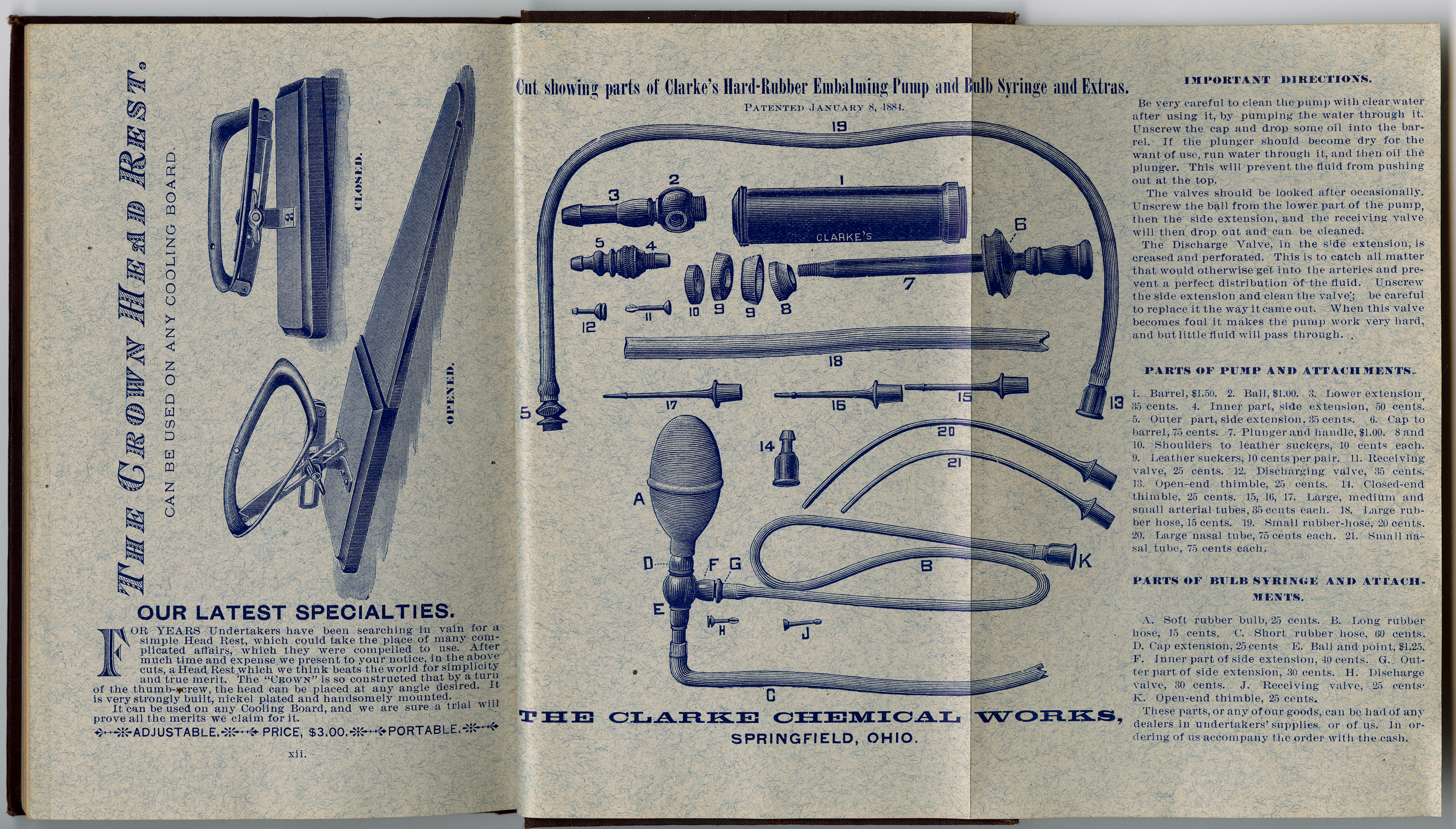
Clarke's embalming instruments

Following the Philadelphia adventure the school moved on to New York City, where, on December 1, 1882, the school encountered its largest class. It contained seventeen students, and the lectures were given in a society hall. As the year-end approached, the Clarke School of Embalming proceeded to conduct its last few classes of the year. One was in Boston on December 11, and the other was in New York City for a second time. The year of 1882 was prosperous. Having taught 106 students in four major cities, Clarke stated that "This ended our first year's effort to convince the people that embalming was a successful way of preserving the human dead." Coincidentally the year 1882 was also the founding year for the National Funeral Directors Association.

As the Clarke School continued over the next few years, other schools began to develop. Their enrollments were boosted by various state laws that required licensing of embalmers. Schooling often consisted of a system of memorizing questions and model answers for licensing exams. The result was that many students were licensed without having proper knowledge. The early courses consisted of anatomy, sanitary science, and embalming.

=== Charles O. Dhonau ===
In 1909, the ownership and management of Clarke's School was secured by Charles O. Dhonau, under whom it acquired its status as the Cincinnati College of Embalming. Dhonau was born on March 23, 1886, in Cincinnati. Early on he decided to enter the career of funeral service and work in his father's funeral home at Knowlton's Corner. But after the two-week period of instruction, Charles was dissatisfied with the length and depth of the program. He believed that mortuary education should be improved and expanded and, therefore, decided to enter the field of education. Clarke himself was soon to retire, and he encouraged Dhonau to accept the challenge of teaching and taking over the college. Dhonau accepted his advice and purchased the college in 1909.

Over the years it became clear that Dhonau was very concerned about the educational and licensing system and wrote, "Whatever a student really understood was secondary to his ability to memorize." He sought to change this philosophy and in doing so stated, 'When one has learned to know and understand, learned to think through the use of suitable thinking instrumentalities, one may more intelligently apply what one has learned to know and has developed the ability to do.' Six years later Dhonau moved the college to the Cincinnati General Hospital where the large number of hospital cases gave students the experience that was required. In 1919, more classroom and office space was assigned to the college at the General Hospital to accommodate larger class sizes. Even though additional space was allocated, classes were still too large for the hospital. In 1933, Dhonau moved the administrative offices and classrooms into a newly remodeled arts and science building at 3200 Reading Road. The space was greatly appreciated when the college enrolled the largest classes in its history shortly after World War II.

In 1954, Dhonau continued to promote that mortuary education consisted of more than simply memorizing questions and their model answers. He said, "Since 1909, it has been our opinion, here at Cincinnati, that a mortuary college can be an educational institution rather than a state examination coaching facility; and we have never lost sight of that academic point." To support his vision of competence and education in funeral service, Dhonau established a cooperative relationship with the University of Cincinnati for general studies and professional subjects. In 1966, Dhonau changed the name of the college to the Cincinnati College of Mortuary Science. By fostering an atmosphere of support for research and publication, Dhonau also stimulated productivity in the faculty. Over the years, some 20 books were written by CCMS faculty, and several patents were produced at the college. Among the books was the series written by Dhonau and A. J. Nunnamaker on Anatomy for Embalmers, Hygiene and Sanitary Science, Manual of Case Analysis, Manual of Restorative Art, Personalities in Funeral Management, and Dissecting Guide for Embalmers. In 1940, Thomas Stueve, a Cincinnati attorney and member of the CCMS faculty, wrote Mortuary Law, which has become a standard in funeral service and in funeral service education. In 1985, James Dorn, CCMS faculty member and Chairman of Embalming Sciences, and Barbara Hopkins, Chairperson of the Xavier University Chemistry Department, co-authored and published Thanatochemistry, which is the standard chemistry textbook in funeral service education.

As the years progressed, Dhonau came to believe that a small proprietary college would need broader support if it were to survive. In the late 1960s he worked with Thomas Stueve, and they formed the Cincinnati Foundation for Mortuary Education, a private, non-profit 501(c)(3) organization that would support the Cincinnati College of Mortuary Science. In 1970, Dhonau transferred all personal assets and responsibility to the Foundation. When Dhonau retired, George M. Sleichter became Director of the institution. Sleichter had served CCMS for over 40 years as a faculty member and chemistry teacher. In 1975, owing to health problems, Sleichter resigned, and David FitzSimmons was appointed President of CCMS early in 1976. FitzSimmons reorganized the college, renewed its faculty, and conducted a revision of the curriculum. Soon after he arrived, FitzSimmons negotiated a two- and four-year degree program with Edgecliff College in addition to the CCMS one-year diploma program.

The association with Edgecliff College gave CCMS new opportunities for growth. In 1979, CCMS moved from 3200 Reading Road to 2220 Victory Parkway on the Edgecliff campus under the terms of a lease agreement. The new surroundings offered campus life but still recognized CCMS as a distinctive and separate college. One year later Xavier University purchased Edgecliff College and changed the name to the Edgecliff Campus of Xavier University. In 1980, CCMS received authorization from the Ohio Board of Regents to award the Associate of Applied Science degree, and in 1982 it received accreditation of that degree by the North Central Association of Colleges and Schools. In 1986, CCMS became the first private college of mortuary science in the nation to be authorized to award the Bachelor of Mortuary Science degree. In 1987, CCMS was accredited by the North Central Association and by the American Board of Funeral Service Education at the bachelor's degree level. In 1994, because of continued growth, CCMS purchased 16 acres of land in Finneytown and built its own permanent home across the street from St. Xavier High School. CCMS moved into the state-of-the-art facilities in 1995.

== Notable alumni ==
- Rhine McLin – former mayor of Dayton, Ohio
- J. L. Plummer –longest serving member in the history of the Miami City Commission
- Rob Rue – mayor of Springfield, Ohio
- Charlie Wilson – member of the U.S. House of Representatives from Ohio's 6th congressional district
