= Joe Sanchez (politician) =

- Official portrait photograph, circa 2003

Member of the Miami City Commission from the 3rd district
- In office 1998–2009
- Preceded by: Humberto Hernandez Jr.
- Succeeded by: Frank Carollo

Personal details
- Born: April 13, 1965 (age 61) Cardenas, Cuba
- Party: Republican
- Occupation: highway patrol officer, politician

Joe M. Sanchez (born April 13, 1965) is an Cuban-American politician who formerly served as a member of the Miami City Commission. He unsuccessfully ran for mayor of Miami in 2009 and sheriff of Miami-Dade County in 2024.

== Early life, education, and career ==
Sanchez was born in Cárdenas, Cuba, on April 13, 1965. He arrived in the United States at the age of five, settling in the Little Havana neighborhood of Miami.

Sanchez graduated from Miami Senior High School (in 1983) and Miami Dade College. He served for eight years in the United States Army Reserves, From 1987 to 1994 serving in the 324th General Hospital in Perrine as a Petroleum Supply specialist

Sanchez joined the Florida Highway Patrol (FHP) in 1987. Through, he remained a patrol trooper. As of late 2025, he worked as an information officer for the FHP. During his career as a state trooper, other positions he has held have included working as a community affairs officer and an hispanic affairs officer on the tactical response team.

In 1996, the government of Miami-Dade County awarded him its Medal of Valor for his leadership as a member of the search recovery team that searched for victims of ValuJet Flight 592 (which had crashed in the Everglades).

Sanchez married Betty Figueroa Sanchez, with whom he had children.

== City of Miami Commission ==
Official portrait, circa 2001

Sanchez served as a member of the Miami City Commission (city council) for eleven years. He took office on June 5, 1998.

As a commissioner, Sanchez served as chairman of the International Trade Board, a board member of the Miami River Commission, and vice chairman of the Miami Sports and Exhibition Authority.

In 2008, he urged for temporary federal protection status for Haitian arrivals.

=== 2009 mayoral campaign ===
Sanchez ran for mayor of Miami in 2009. He faced fellow city commissioner Tomás Regalado.

During the campaign, Sanchez was seen as more aligned with outgoing (term limited) mayor Many Diaz's support for large development projects in the city, while Regalado had been a frequent critic of Diaz and other previous mayors.

== 2024 sheriff campaign and subsequent politics ==
Sanchez ran for sheriff of Miami-Dade County in 2024. The election was held after a state constitutional amendment required the county to establish an elected sheriff. It had previously not had an elected sheriff since 1966. Sanchez was the runner-up on the Republican primary.

Sanchez was considered a possible contender for mayor of Miami in 2025, but did not run. He also considered running for Miami-Dade Commission in 2025.

In November 2025, Sanchez was one of five who applied for appointment to the Miami-Dade County Commission seat vacated by Eileen Higgins. Commissioners passed over him in favor of appointing Vicki Lopez. Sanchez ran in the 2026 special election for the seat, placing third of three candidates in a three-candidate race and failing to advance to the runoff election.
