= Willy Gort =

American politician (born 1940)

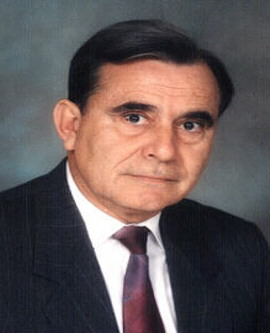
- Official portrait photograph, 1990s

37th Mayor of Miami
- Acting
- In office June 4, 1996 – July 24, 1996
- Preceded by: Stephen P. Clark
- Succeeded by: Joe Carollo

Vice Mayor of Miami
- In office 1996–1997
- Preceded by: J. L. Plummer
- Succeeded by: Tomás Regalado

Member of the Miami City Commission
- In office January 12, 2010 – January 7, 2020
- Preceded by: Angel Gonzalez
- Succeeded by: Alex Díaz de la Portilla
- Constituency: 1st district
- In office November 9, 1993 – November 7, 2001
- Preceded by: Miriam Alonso
- Constituency: at-large seat 4 (1993–1997)

Personal details
- Born: Wilfredo Gort de los Llanos; November 9, 1940 (age 85) Havana, Cuba

official portrait, circa 2010

portrait, circa 2020s

Wilfredo Gort de los Llanos (born November 9, 1940) is a Cuban-American politician who served as the 37th and acting Mayor of Miami from June to July 1996. Gort was a City of Miami Commissioner from 1993 to 2001 and again from 2010 to 2020.

Born in Havana, Cuba, Gort is the son of photographer, Alfredo “Willy” Gort (1909–2003) and Miami Cuban civic leader, Esther de los Llanos de Gort (1915–1984). He and his parents fled Cuba in 1952 after Fulgencio Batista overthrew the government and moved to Miami. In 1959, after Fidel Castro came to power, he returned to Cuba for 3 days and again went into exile.

In 1993, Gort ran against Joe Carollo, a former City of Miami commissioner and won the election. In 1996, Gort who was Vice-Mayor at the time became acting mayor at the death of Stephen P. Clark. In 2001, Gort resigned his commission seat to run for mayor of Miami, but did not make the runoff election that eventually elected Manny Diaz, mayor of Miami. In 2010, Gort returned to the City commission in the special election and was reelected in 2011 and 2015. Gort retired and opted to not run in the 2019 elections being succeeded by Alex Díaz de la Portilla.

== See also ==
- List of mayors of Miami
- Government of Miami

Political offices
Preceded by Stephen P. Clark	Mayor of Miami; 1996	Succeeded by Joe Carollo
