= Alex Penelas =

American politician (born 1961)

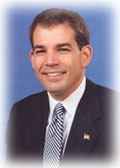

5th Mayor of Miami-Dade County
- In office October 1, 1996 – November 6, 2004
- Preceded by: Stephen P. Clark (Metropolitan Dade County)
- Succeeded by: Carlos Álvarez

Member of the Miami-Dade Board of County Commissioners
- In office 1990–1996

Member of the Hialeah City Council
- In office 1987–1990

Personal details
- Born: Alexander Penelas; December 18, 1961 (age 64) Miami, Florida, U.S.
- Party: Democratic
- Spouse: Lilliam
- Children: 3
- Education: St. Thomas University (A.B.); University of Miami (J.D.)
- Profession: Lawyer; Politician

Alexander Penelas (born December 18, 1961) is an American attorney who is the former mayor of Miami-Dade County, Florida.

== Education and personal life ==
Penelas, an American of Cuban descent, attended St. Thomas University and graduated in 1981 with a degree in political science. In 1985, he received his J.D. degree from the University of Miami School of Law, where he graduated cum laude and was inducted into the university's Iron Arrow Honor Society.

Penelas and his wife, Lilliam, have two adult sons, William and Christopher, and a younger daughter, Alexandra.

== City council and county commission ==
Alex Penelas served on the city council of Hialeah, Florida from 1987 to 1990. In 1990, he was elected to serve as a county commissioner in Dade County.

== County mayor ==
Penelas ran in 1996 for Mayor of Dade County, renamed Miami-Dade County in 1997. Penelas advanced to the runoff for Mayor against fellow commissioner Arthur Teele. Penelas scored 37% to Teele's 25% with former mayor of Miami Maurice Ferre and Xavier Suarez in third and fourth. In the run-off Penelas soundly beat Teele with 60.56% to Teele's 39.44%. Penelas ran for reelection in 2000 and beat Miami Dade Commissioner Miguel Diaz de la Portilla with 51.6% to Diaz de la Portilla's 20.9%. Because Penelas reached the 50% threshold, a runoff was not needed.

Penelas championed the "Transit, Not Tolls" campaign in 1999, urging residents to vote in support of a one-cent sales tax that was to have funded a large public transportation expansion. The revenue from the tax was intended to fund a plan that aimed to relieve traffic congestion through the construction of eight new Metrorail, a doubling the number of buses operated by the county, and the construction of additional roads, and removing some existing road tolls. The measure was defeated.

As mayor, he vocally opposed the repatriation of Elián González in 2000, but was not successful in stopping the repatriation.

During his mayoralty, Penelas garnered a public perception as being tied to Miami-area political corruption.

== 2004 U.S. Senate campaign ==
In 2004, Penelas was term-limited as mayor and ran for 2004 United States Senate election in Florida. This was the first open Senate seat since 1980, it was being vacated by longtime incumbent and Dade County native Bob Graham. Penelas finished third in the primary, behind Betty Castor and Peter Deutsch. His campaign was made more difficult when Al Gore called him "the single most treacherous and dishonest person I dealt with during the 2000 presidential election campaign anywhere in America."

Penelas was also voted to be an at-large Florida alternate delegate to the 2004 Democratic National Convention.

== 2020 county mayoral bid ==
In April 2019, Penelas announced his campaign to be returned to the county mayoralty. While he initially led in most polls, he ultimately finished in third in the first round of the election, behind Daniella Levine Cava and Esteban Bovo.

Political offices
Preceded by Position abolished 1993-1996	Mayor of Miami-Dade County, Florida; 1996-2004	Succeeded by Carlos Alvarez
