= 1975 Miami mayoral election =

- November 8, 1975
- Turnout: 24.6% (of registered voters)

Candidate	Maurice Ferré	Peter Williams
Popular vote	23,149	4,173
Percentage	67.13%	14.96%
Mayor before election
Maurice Ferré
Elected mayor
Maurice Ferré

The 1975 Miami mayoral election was held November 8, 1975. It saw incumbent mayor Maurice Ferré win a second term in a landslide victory over a single weak opponent.

== Background ==
Maurice Ferré, the incumbent mayor, had two years prior won a landslide victory in which he had led in all but one precinct.

== Candidates ==
- Maurice Ferré, incumbent mayor
- Peter Napoleon Williams Jr.

== Campaign ==
Ferre's campaign relied primarily on direct mail advertising.

While the campaign finance laws at the time capped total contributions a campaign could accept at $20,000, Williams had received a mere $305 by late October.

== Results ==
Result
Candidate	Votes	%
Maurice Ferré (incumbent)	22,768	81.64
Peter Williams	4,173	14.96
Total votes	27,888	100
