= M. Athalie Range =

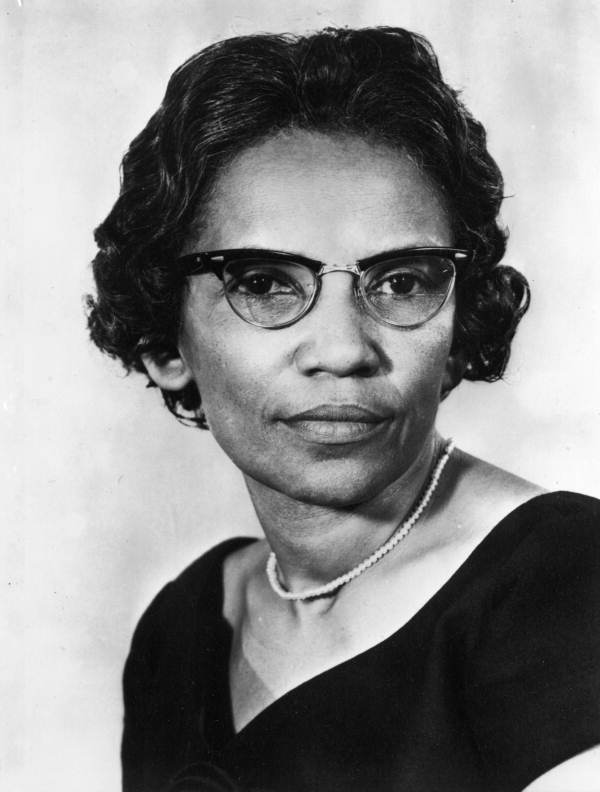
- portrait of Range, circa 1972

Head of the Florida Department of Community Affairs
- In office 1971–1973
- Appointed by: Reubin Askew

Vice Mayor of Miami
- In office 1970
- Mayor: Stephen P. Clark
- Preceded by: Irwin Christie
- Succeeded by: J. L. Plummer

Member of the Miami City Commission
- In office 1966–1971

Personal details
- Born: Mary Athalie Wilkinson; November 7, 1915 Key West, Florida, U.S.
- Died: November 14, 2006 (aged 91) Miami, Florida, U.S.

M. Athalie Range (born Mary Athalie Wilkinson; November 7, 1915 in Key West, Florida – November 14, 2006 in Miami, Florida) was a Bahamian American civil rights activist and politician who was the first African-American to serve on the Miami, Florida City Commission, and the first African-American since Reconstruction and the first woman to head a Florida state agency, the Department of Community Affairs.

== Early life and marriage ==
Mary Athalie Wilkinson was born in Key West, Florida on November 7, 1915. Her grandparents had all been immigrants from the Bahamas. When Athalie was five or six years old, the Wilkinson family moved to Miami. Athalie Wilkinson graduated from all-black Booker T. Washington High School in Overtown, Miami. She married Oscar Lee Range in 1937 and had 4 children, Myrna, Patrick, Oscar, and Gary. During this period the Ranges lived in the Liberty Square Housing Project. During World War II Athalie Range found work cleaning trash from railroad cars.

In 1953 Oscar Range became a certified funeral director and opened the Range Funeral Home in the Liberty City neighborhood in Miami. Oscar Range died unexpectedly of a heart attack in 1960. Athalie Range then enrolled in the New England Institute of Anatomy and Embalming and obtained her funeral director certification so that she could operate the family business. The Range Funeral Homes eventually expanded to three locations, and Athalie Range continued to work in the business for the rest of her life.

== School activism ==
In 1948 Athalie Range became president of the Parent Teacher Association at her children's school, Liberty City Elementary. The school had 1200 students and consisted of all portable classrooms, with no permanent buildings. There were only some twelve toilets for boys and for girls. The only drinking fountains were outside, fed by pipes laid on top of the ground, so that the water was usually too hot to drink. There were no trees or grassy areas on the school grounds and no lunchroom. Liberty City Elementary was one of the few schools in the (county-wide) school district holding two half-day sessions.

Range led 125 African-American parents from the school to a meeting of the school board to present their demands for improvements to the school. After delaying the start of the meeting for an hour, the board heard Athalie Range speak. Much to her surprise, the board agreed to make improvements. They ordered hot meals to be provided by a nearby white school to Liberty City Elementary, moved another portable to the school to use in serving the hot lunches, and began construction of a new, permanent school building, the first school for African-Americans built in the district in twenty-one years. Althalie Range continued to serve as President of school and county-wide PTAs for sixteen years.

== City Commission ==
In 1965 Alice Wainwright, who was the first woman to serve on the Miami City Commission, decided to not seek re-election. Athalie Range became a candidate for the vacant seat, the first African-American to run for the City Commission. She won a plurality in the primary election, although not a majority. In the runoff election, Range's opponent, a white man named Irwin Christie, sent a sound truck through white neighborhoods the day before the election broadcasting the message that if the white people did not get out and vote, they would have a black woman making laws for them. Athalie Range would later say, "His campaign decided to play the race card, which took me out of contention." Many black voters had been allowed to take time off from work to vote in the primary, but were not allowed to do so for the runoff. Range lost the runoff, receiving about 17,000 votes, while Christie received about 18,000. Christie later apologized to Range for the way he had run his campaign, and she accepted the apology.

In 1966 one of the city commissioners resigned his seat, possibly with the encouragement of Miami Mayor Robert King High. High was running for the Democratic Party nomination for Governor of Florida at the time. He appointed Athalie Range to fill the unexpired term of the commissioner who had resigned. In 1967 and again in 1969 Athalie Range was reelected to the City Commission. While on the commission, Range sought to have garbage collection improved in black neighborhoods, which sometimes went three weeks between garbage pickups, while white neighborhoods got twice a week pickups. After a vote on her proposed ordinance to equalize garbage service was twice postponed, Range had her neighbors bring bags of garbage to the commission meeting and dump them on the commissioners' desks. After that, the ordinance was passed. She also pressed for tighter gun controls but was able to get only part of what she wanted. After a fire caused by a kerosene heater killed eleven people in a house in a black neighborhood, Range led an effort to have such heaters banned in Miami.

Range approached City Manager Melvin Reese about having an African-American police officer assigned to motorcycle patrol. When Reese resisted, Range made a deal with Mayor High; her vote for buying the land for the proposed Alice Wainwright Park in exchange for an African-American motorcycle patrolman. The first African-American motorcycle patrolman in Miami was Robert Ingraham, who later became Chief of Police and then Mayor of Opa-locka, Florida

When asked about her accomplishments in office, Range said, "There were so many inequities in those days that you could just reach out and pick something and change it."

== Later accomplishments ==
In 1971 newly elected Florida Governor Reubin Askew appointed Athalie Range as Secretary of the Department of Community Affairs. She became the first African-American since Reconstruction and the first woman ever to head a state agency in Florida. As Secretary, she managed a department with 200 employees and a US$5.2 million annual budget. She remained in the position until 1973.

In 1974, Athalie Range became the first honorary member of Alpha Kappa Alpha sorority in the state of Florida. Her membership into the historic African-American sorority was sponsored by the Gamma Zeta Omega chapter of Alpha Kappa Alpha.

Athalie Range was one of the first African-Americans in Florida to back Jimmy Carter when he ran for President. Range introduced Carter to African-American groups in Florida before he had announced his candidacy. President Carter later appointed Range to a two-year term on the National Railroad Passenger Corporation (AMTRAK) governing board. In a little over thirty years she had gone from cleaning railroad cars to helping run AMTRAK.

In 1989 Athalie Range was once again appointed to fill a vacancy on the Miami City Commission. Athalie Range was inducted into the Florida Women's Hall of Fame in 1997. In 2004 she was still helping run the family funeral homes and served as the founding Chairman of the Virginia Key Beach Park Task Force later known as the Virginia Key Beach Park Trust, which was established to preserve the Virginia Key Beach Park which re-opened in 2008 as Historic Virginia Key Beach Park, once the only public beach in Dade County open to African-Americans.

Athalie Range Park, and the Athalie Range Olympic Swimming Complex are named after her. There is also a strip of Miami's Biscayne Boulevard named in her honor. M. Athalie Range died November 14, 2006, in Miami, at the age of 91.
