= Maurice Ferré =

American politician and former Mayor of Miami (1935–2019)

Maurice Antonio Ferré
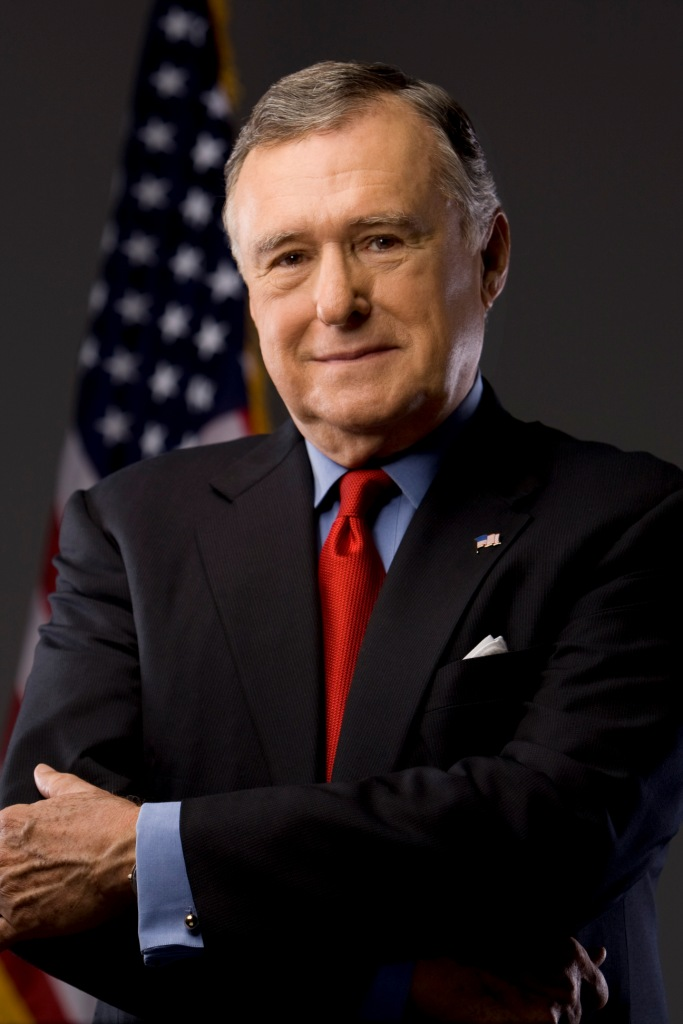
- Portrait photograph, 2009

Mayor of Miami
- In office November 8, 1973 – November 14, 1985
- Preceded by: David T. Kennedy
- Succeeded by: Xavier Suarez
- Interim; April 19, 1973 – August 17, 1973
- Preceded by: David T. Kennedy
- Succeeded by: David T. Kennedy

Vice Chairman of the Dade County Commission
- In office 1993–1996

Member of the Dade County Commission from district 7
- In office May 1, 1993 – January 3, 1997
- Preceded by: Constituency established
- Succeeded by: Jimmy Morales

Member of the Miami City Commission
- In office 1967–1970
- Preceded by: Stephen P. Clark
- Succeeded by: J. L. Plummer
- Constituency: 3rd at-large seat

Member of the Florida House of Representatives from the 91st district
- In office April 4, 1967 – March 1, 1968

Personal details
- Born: June 23, 1935 Ponce, Puerto Rico
- Died: September 19, 2019 (aged 84) Miami, Florida, U.S.
- Resting place: Caballero Rivero Woodlawn North Park Cemetery and Mausoleum
- Party: Democratic
- Spouse: Mercedes Ferré
- Children: 6
- Education: University of Miami (BS, MBA)
- Occupation: Politician

Maurice Antonio Ferré (June 23, 1935 – September 19, 2019) was an American politician and businessman who served six terms as the Mayor of Miami (1973–1985). Ferré was the first Latino person to serve as mayor of Miami. He also served on the Dade County Board of Commissioners (1993–1997), Florida House of Representatives (1967–1968), and Miami City Commission (1967–1970). He unsuccessfully ran for mayor of Miami-Dade County in 1996 and 2004. In 2001, he unsuccessfully ran for city mayor again. He was a candidate for U.S. Senate in 2010, unsuccessfully seeking the Democratic nomination.

== Early years, family, and education ==
Ferré was born in Ponce, Puerto Rico. His family is considered to have held aristocratic status in Puerto Rico. He was the son of businessman José Ferré and nephew of governor of Puerto Rico Luis A. Ferré (1904–2003). Ferre's father José visited Miami, Florida in the 1920s and wondered why the city did not have any tall buildings. He then ventured into construction and real estate development in Miami. Ferré was born when José and his family returned to their hometown of Ponce.

In 1953, Ferré graduated high school at The Lawrenceville School (a boarding school in Lawrenceville, New Jersey). In 1957, Ferré graduated from the University of Miami with a bachelor of science in architectural engineering. In 1958, he completed graduate studies at the same university for an Master of Business Administration.

== Private sector work ==
Ferré was also a businessman. He served as a director of fourteen different corporations that the Ferré family operated in Florida, Puerto Rico, and Venezuela. The family's businesses included a $600 million concrete company, Maule Industries, which went bankrupt in 1976 amid a recession. Ferré was also a property owner and property developer. He also worked as a banker and business consultant, and held various research and teaching posts

== Political career ==
Ferré had a decades-long career in elected office. During his political career, he was active in national political campaigns, and was a member of several presidential advisory boards. A member of the Democratic Party, he was a delegate to four Democratic National Conventions.

Prior to holding elected office, Ferré was a member of the Non-Group —a largely-secretive group of city business elites that was for decades considered a de facto force in local governance.

Ferré was a founding member of the National Association of Latino Elected Officials (NALEO), Caribbean/ Central America Action, and Inter-American Dialogue. He was the founding chairman of the Hispanic Council on Foreign Affairs. He also served as a board member of the National Democratic Institute for International Affairs and the advisory board of the National Institute Against Prejudice & Violence. He also was a member of the Council on Foreign Relations.

Ferré was on a fellowship at Princeton University and was writing a book about the contributions that Hispanics have made to American culture. Ferré was one of the driving forces behind the "intermestic" (an abbreviation of international and domestic) dialogue, which attempts to seek consensus regarding Puerto Rico's political status problem from both an international and domestic vantage point. He spoke about this effort to deal with Puerto Rico's political status in an address to the Puerto Rico Senate as keynote speaker during the Governors' Day special session on February 16, 2006.

In 1996, Florida International University political science professor Dario Moreno opined that Ferré had a brand of politics that most appealed to "middle-class-and-higher Anglos and Latins," describing him as not being a populist and having a political brand shaped in large part by his family background as "a patrician, a Latin aristocrat."

=== Florida House of Representatives (1967–1968) and Miami City Commission (1967–1970) ===
Ferré and other state reps being administered their oath of office by Chief Justice B. Campbell Thornal on April 4, 1967 (left to right: Gerald Lewis, Ferré, Ken Myers, Louis Wolfson II, Murray Dubbin, Carey Matthews)

Ferré unsuccessfully ran for Florida State Senate in 1966, but soon after won a seat in the Florida House of Representatives (being elected as a Democrat). He served in the state house from 1967 to 1968, representing the 91st district and first taking office on April 4, 1967.

In late-1967, Ferré was appointed to the Miami City Commission (city council), filling the seat left vacant when City Commissioner Stephen P. Clark became mayor following the death Mayor Robert King High. For some time, Ferré held both his state house seat and city commission seat coincidingly. He resigned from the State House on March 1, 1968. In late-1970, he resigned from the Miami City Commission in order to run for county mayor.

=== 1970 Metro Mayor campaign ===
In 1970, Ferré ran for Metropolitan Dade County Mayor (county executive). He lost to Stephen P. Clark (the mayor of the city of Miami).

=== Mayor of Miami (1973–1985) ===
Ferré (back row, fourth from right) poses with little league players at the 1974 dedication of Roberto Clemente Park. He is joined by other politicians, including Rep. Claude Pepper, Gov. Reubin Askew, and City Commissioner Rose Gordon

Ferré (second from right) with other dignitaries at the 1974 dedication of Roberto Clemente Park. From left to right: unidentified man, Rafael Hernández Colón (Gov. of Puerto Rico), Gov. Askew, Ferré, Rep. Pepper, and Mildred Pepper

Ferré served as mayor of Miami from 1973 to 1985. He was the first Latino person to serve as mayor of Miami, and the first Puerto Rican-born mayor of a major city in the mainland United States.

Ferré's mayoral tenure included six consecutive elected 2-year terms. He first took office on an acting basis in mid-1973, being appointed by Governor Reubin Askew to serve as mayor while David T. Kennedy was suspended from the office. Ferré soon re-assumed the office after being elected to his first full term in November 1973. He was re-elected in 1975, 1977, 1979, 1981, and 1983. In 1985, he again sought re-election, but was defeated (failing to advance to the runoff). In 1987 he attempted unsuccessfully to win back the mayoralty.

Ferré is sometimes referred to as the "father of modern-day Miami." To pay tribute to him and his legacy, a park district in Miami, formerly called Museum Park, was named after him in early 2019. After his death, the city's local CBS News affiliate recalled, "Ferré led Miami during tumultuous times and shaped the city's future as an international banking center and gateway to Latin America."

In 1996, Jim DeFede of the Miami New Times opined that, after Ferré's own ambitions of developing high-rise additions to Miami's skyline were scuttled by the bankruptcy of his family concrete company, he retained his ambition to see the city's skyline grow and shifted his attention towards motivating other businessmen to build up the city's skyline. DeFede opined,

By encouraging the proliferation of skyscrapers, Ferre shifted Miami’s tax base. The government, once dependent on the property taxes of individual homeowners, now drew its largest block of revenue from the corporations that had settled in the city’s core. Lost, however, in Ferre’s drive to build was an understanding that a municipality is more than just the sum of its largest buildings. It is actually made up of people whose needs are far less grandiose and visionary — people who want their garbage collected regularly, their streets well maintained, and their neighborhoods kept safe from criminals.

Ferré (far right) in group portrait during the 1975 dedication of the Abe Goldman Building in Miami's Flagami Park

Ferré speaking in front of the Main Library at Bayfront Park in October 1977

Much of Ferré's tenure coincided with the Metro Dade Government having a liberal city manager. The 1970s, were consequently perceived as a particularly progressive era for Miami in regards to local governance.

As mayor, Ferré participated in the United States Conference of Mayors.

In 1975, President Gerald Ford appointed Ferré to the Presidential Advisory Committee on Refugees, a newly-created committee. In 1977, President Jimmy Carter appointed Ferré to the Presidential Advisory Board of Ambassadorial Appointments. Ferré was a member of the delegation that President Carte sent to the 1978 UNESCO General Assembly.

In 1980, several events brought a general sense of chaos and crisis to the city. The Mariel boatlift (mass emigration from Cuban between April 15 and October 31) brought mass arrivals that overwhelmed local resources. The city requested new assistance from the county government to deal with the new arrivals. Immigration policies were altered in 1980, which led to friction between local agencies and higher levels of government. Additionally, the local impacts of the crack cocaine epidemic worsened. Additionally, riots erupted on May 18, 1980 in reaction to the acquittal of police officers involved in the murder of Arthur McDuffie.

Ferré had enjoyed strong African American support in all of his successful mayoral elections. However, his firing of Howard Gary (who was African American) from the position of city manager had caused African American support for him to dissipate prior to the 1985 election. Anger over Gary's firing was seen as a major factor in Ferré's ultimate first round defeat in the 1985 election.

=== Dade County Board of Commissioners (1993–1997) ===
From 1993 to 1997, Ferré served in the Dade County Board of Commissioners and from 1993 to 1996 was the Vice-Chairman of the board.

=== 1996 and 2004 county mayoral campaigns; 2001 city mayoral campaign; 2010 U.S. Senate campaign ===
Ferré campaigning for the U.S. Senate at a July 2010 picnic hosted in Tallahassee by the Democratic Club of North Florida

Ferré ran for mayor of Miami-Dade County in 1996, finishing in third against fellow Commissioners Alex Penelas and Arthur Teele. Ferré won 20% and did not make it to the runoff.

In November 2001, Ferré lost his bid to be once again elected as Mayor of Miami.

Ferré attempted his second run for mayor of Miami-Dade County in 2004; however, he won only 17.76% of the vote, and did not make the run-off.

In October 2009, Ferré announced that he was running for the open U.S. Senate seat of Mel Martinez. He finished in fourth place (last place) in the Democratic primary, with only 4.9% of the vote.

=== Florida Transportation Commission and later work ===
Ferré endorsed the candidacy of Rick Scott (the Republican nominee) in the 2010 Florida gubernatorial election. In 2011, Governor Scott appointed Ferré to the Florida Transportation Commission, which was one of the most high-profile appointments of a Democrat during Scott's governorship.

Ahead of the primaries for the 2014 gubernatorial election, Ferré endorsed Democratic candidate Nan Rich. However, he held off on criticizing Governor Scott. After Rich lost the primary to former governor Charlie Crist (a former Republican, turned Democrat), Ferré endorsed Scott's re-election in the general election. He went as far as to film a Spanish-language television advertisement in support of Scott's re-election (co-starring former Puerto Rican governor Luis Fortuño). Ahead of the Democratic primary for the 2018 gubernatorial election, Ferré endorsed the unsuccessful candidacy of Gwen Graham.

== Personal life and death ==
In the mid-1950s, Ferré married his wife Mercedes, a Venezuelan-born heiress. Together they had four sons and two daughters.

Ferré's granddaughter, Sonia Succar Rodriguez, married Democratic Florida state senator Jose Javier Rodriguez. One of Ferré's sons married Helen Aguirre Ferré, who served as Director of White House Media Affairs and advisor to the president during the First Trump administration.

On December 20, 1995, Francisco Ferré Malaussena, Mariana Gómez de Ferré, and Felipe Antonio Ferré Gómez (the son, daughter-in-law, and grandson of Ferré) died when American Airlines Flight 965 crashed into a mountain in Colombia.

Ferré died in Miami on September 19, 2019, from an aggressive spinal cancer he had fought for two years. He was 84 years of age. His passing occurred at his longtime residence in the southern portion of Miami's Coconut Grove neighborhood. His wife, Mercedes, and his children and grandchildren were present by his side when he died. He had recently undergone chemotherapy shortly before his death. He was buried at Caballero Rivero Woodlawn Park North Cemetery and Mausoleum in Miami.

== See also ==
- List of mayors of Miami
- Government of Miami
- List of Puerto Ricans

Political offices
Preceded by David T. Kennedy	Mayor of Miami; 1973	Succeeded by David T. Kennedy
Preceded by David T. Kennedy	Mayor of Miami; 1973–1985	Succeeded by Xavier Suárez
