= Tomás Regalado (American politician) =

American politician (born 1947)

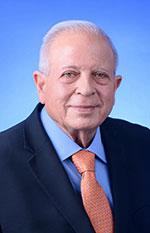
- Official portrait, 2025

Property Appraiser of Miami-Dade County
- Incumbent
- Assumed office January 7, 2025
- Preceded by: Pedro Garcia

42nd Mayor of Miami
- In office November 11, 2009 – November 7, 2017
- Preceded by: Manny Diaz
- Succeeded by: Francis Suarez

Member of the Miami City Commission
- In office November 1996 – November 2009
- Preceded by: Joe Carollo
- Succeeded by: Francis Suarez

Vice Mayor of Miami
- In office 1997
- Preceded by: Willy Gort
- Succeeded by: Humberto Hernandez Jr.

Personal details
- Born: Tomás Pedro Regalado y Valdez; May 24, 1947 (age 79) Havana, Cuba
- Party: Republican
- Spouses: Raquel Ferreiro (m. 1972; died 2008) Ana Cristina Carrodeguas (m. 2015)
- Children: 3

Tomás Pedro Regalado y Valdez (born May 24, 1947) is a Cuban American politician and former broadcast journalist who has served as the property appraiser of Miami-Dade County since 2025. A member of the Republican Party, he previously served as the 42nd mayor of Miami from 2009 to 2017.

He served as the news director for Radio Mambí WAQI and as a reporter for Univisión.

== Early life and education ==
Born in Havana, Cuba, on May 24, 1947, Tomás Pedro Regalado was the first-born child of Tomás Regalado Molina and Carmen Rita Váldez de Regalado. His father was an attorney and a journalist who was the last president of the Cuban Association of Journalists and Reporters and a political prisoner under the U.S.-backed Batista dictatorship. Prior to leaving Cuba, Tomás attended elementary school at La Salle Catholic School in Havana. In April 1962, when Tomás was 14, he and his younger brother Marcos were placed on a flight to Miami as participants of Operation Peter Pan. The two brothers lived at the boys' camp in Kendall and then Florida City for several months until their aunt, Silvia Váldez, claimed them. They lived with her until their mother arrived in Miami a year later.

In Miami, Regalado attended high school at Immaculata-Lasalle High School in Coconut Grove and then at the Lindsey Hopkins vocational school. He attended seminars at the University of Miami Koubek Center for journalism.

== Journalism career ==
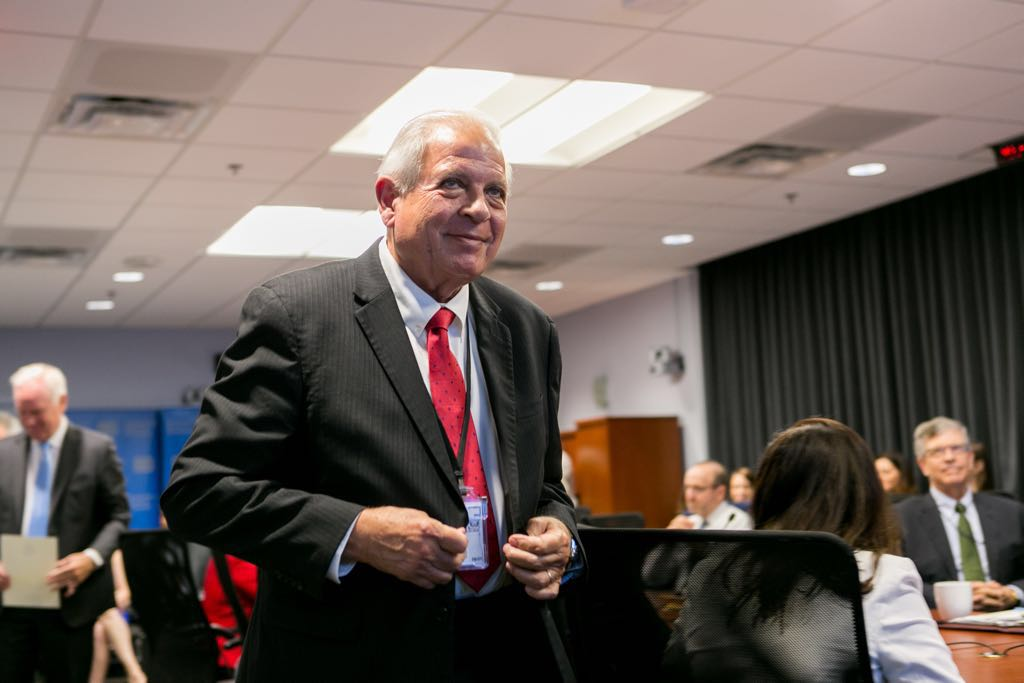
Regalado, in 2018 as Director of Office of Cuba Broadcasting at a BBG meeting in Washington, D.C.

Regalado became the youngest reporter on staff at WFAB, La Fabulosa. He quickly ascended from reporter to assistant producer. At twenty one, Regalado was hired by WCKT (now WSVN) an NBC affiliate as the Latin American news editor and host of the news program Tele-Amigo. After two years at WCKT then Channel 7, Regalado returned to WFAB as a news producer and anchor.

In 1974, Regalado became a reporter for WLTV Channel 23 but returned to radio in 1977 as the news director in charge of all programming for La Fabulosa, WFAB. In 1970, Regalado decided to leave the news desk and became the station's first international news correspondent. In the years that followed, Regalado traveled to Africa and covered the civil war in Angola, the riots in Soweto, South Africa and the civil war in Mozambique.

Regalado had interviewed Presidents Richard Nixon, Gerald Ford and Jimmy Carter. In 1983, he became the first Cuban American member of the White House Press Corps. As a member of the Press Corps, Regalado traveled with Presidents Ronald Reagan, George H. W. Bush, and Bill Clinton. Regalado accompanied the presidents on their foreign trips, including but not limited to summits from 1983 to 1993 and met such figures as Mikhail Gorbachev, Boris Yeltsin, and Anwar Al Sadat. In this time period, Regalado also covered the presidential campaigns and national party conventions.

In 1986, Regalado was approved as an applicant to NASA's Journalist in Space Program which was canceled after the Challenger explosion. While a full-time news director on Spanish-language radio Regalado also worked for El Miami Herald as a weekly columnist. Regalado covered the civil war in Nicaragua and El Salvador and has visited over 78 countries throughout the world. Along with his wife Raquel, Tomas spoke several times before the Human Rights Commission of United Nations in Geneva Switzerland against human rights violations in Cuba.

In June 2018, Regalado was sworn in as the Director of the Office of Cuba Broadcasting (OCB).

== Political career ==
=== Miami Commissioner (1996–2009) ===
official portrait photograph, circa early 2000s

official portrait, circa 2000s

On September 3, 1996, Regalado was elected in a special election for the 4th district city commissioner seat vacated by newly elected Mayor Joe Carollo. He defeated CC Reed.

One week after his election, the city of Miami's economic crisis was exposed by Operation Green Palm and an oversight board was installed. Governor Lawton Chiles declared Miami a state of financial emergency. He opposed laying off police officers saying "The police have been the darling of the city of Miami."

During that time, he kept the news director position in the Spanish Broadcasting Systems by working as a daily host and commentator on WWFE la Poderosa and a host of a daily news program on the Cable Network TeleMiami.

Regalado won re-election in 1999 (unknown), 2003 (unopposed), and 2007 (90%).

=== Mayor of Miami (2009–2017) ===
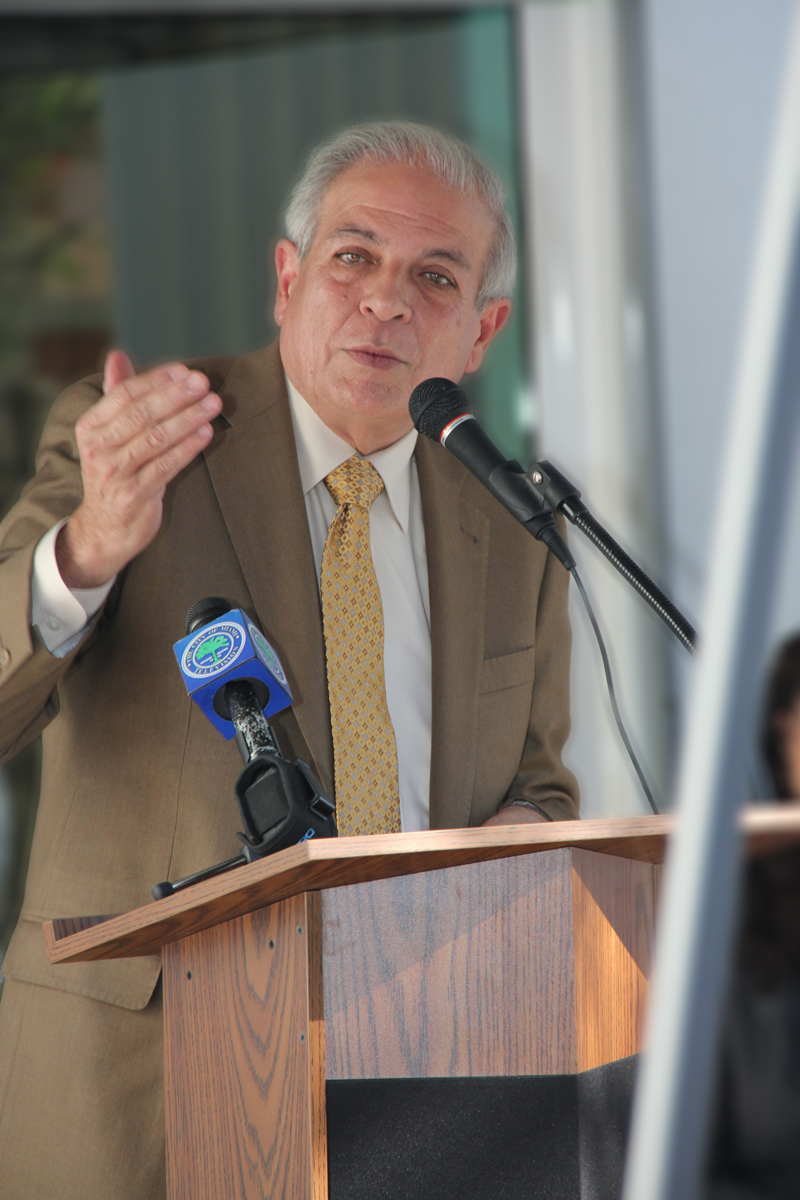
Regalado, speaking in 2012 at the grand opening of an affordable housing community in Miami

Regalado speaking in 2015 at a veterans event

On November 3, 2009, Regalado was elected Miami's 42nd Mayor with 72% of the vote, defeating Joe Sanchez.

As mayor, Realado kept his promise he would lower his salary by $50,000 as well as reducing his pension by 25%. In 2012 he received from the hands of Roman Viotto Leandro Award "Referrer" awarded by the Foundation Young Leaders. Regalado said in August 2011: "I feel like Bill Clinton. Some people really hated him, and some people loved him."

Regalado said of his goals: "Do I have a vision? Keep taxes down. Reduce the size of government. Fix the potholes. Fix the streets. Pick up the garbage." His biggest accomplishments are balancing the budget three times and striking deals with the unions.

Regalado was re-elected to a second term in office in 2013 with 78% of the vote, garnering over 20,000 votes out of over 26,000 votes cast.

Regalado got national attention in 2017 for challenging President Donald Trump on the issue of sea level rise. Prior to leaving office, Regalado placed on the ballot and campaigned for a sea level rise bond which received overwhelming support.

=== Miami-Dade County Property Appraiser ===
After incumbent property appraiser Pedro Garcia, age 87, announced he would not seek re-election, Regalado defeated Democratic nominee Marisol Zenteno in the 2024 general election with 57% of the vote. Upon assuming office, Regalado proposed lowering taxes for Miami-Dade residents by incorporating harm from climate change into property evaluations.

== Personal life ==
Regalado married a fellow radio commentator, Raquel Ferreiro, in 1972 at St. Hugh Catholic Church in Coconut Grove. The couple were married for thirty-seven years, until Ferreiro's death in 2008. Since 2015, Regalado has been married to Ana Cristina Carrodeguas.

Regalado's father was a political prisoner. In 1979, Tomás Regalado Molina, was released from prison thanks to the intercession of the then President of Costa Rica, Rodrigo Carazo. Regalado Sr. worked alongside his son and daughter-in-law as a producer and news editor at WRHC, the Cadena Azul, and was also a contributor to el Diario de las Americas and El Nuevo Herald until his sudden death in 1995 at the age of 74. Regalado's mother, Carmen Rita, died soon after in 1998.

Regalado has three children:

- His eldest son, Tomás N. Regalado, known as Tommy, is an anchor and producer at TV Marti with political ambitions. In April 2017, he announced his candidacy to City Council for District 3. He was defeated in the general election in November 2017.
- His daughter, Raquel Regalado, is an attorney and was an elected Miami-Dade County Public School Board member for six years representing District 6 and ran for Mayor of Miami-Dade County in 2016. She became a candidate after taking on the proposed Courthouse tax, and took the incumbent Mayor, Carlos A. Giménez, to an unexpected run off. She eventually lost to Giménez, a Republican who supported Hillary Clinton. She later ran for Florida's 27th congressional district, after the incumbent, Ileana Ros-Lehtinen, said she would not be running for re-election. However, she dropped out in November 2017. She currently represents the District 7 seat of the Miami-Dade County Commission.
- His youngest son, José, volunteered for a few years in his father's office, shortly after he began to work in adventure television. As of 2017, he is a legislative aide to Miami's Commissioner from the 4th district, Manolo Reyes.

== See also ==
- List of mayors of Miami
- Government of Miami

Political offices
Preceded by Manny Diaz	Mayor of the City of Miami; 2009–2017	Succeeded by Francis Suarez
