= Miami City Commission =

The Miami City Commission is the city council of Miami, Florida. It is the unicameral legislative branch of the government of Miami. Since Miami has a council-manager form of government, the council and the city manager (whom they appoint) have more statutory power than the mayor of Miami.

== Overview ==
The mayor of Miami is the city's executive and is directly elected; the mayor appoints a city manager to act as Miami's chief administrative officer.

Five city commissioners are also elected from single-member districts of which they are residents. City commissioners also must be qualified voters. The City Commission holds regular meetings in Miami City Hall, located at 3500 Pan American Drive in the neighborhood of Coconut Grove. The Commission has the power to pass ordinances, adopt regulations, and exercise other powers. All city commission offices and that of the mayor are nonpartisan.

== History ==
The current iteration of the Miami City Commission was created in 1921, after the residents of Miami voted to enact a new city charter that included its establishment. The new charter switched the city to a council-manager form of government, with voters electing a five-member city council and a mayor. An election was held thereafter to elect the first commission. The winners of the first election were all presidents of different local banks, leading to the commission to initially carry the nickname of "Banker's Commission".

Originally, all members of the City Commission were elected at-large. In the mid-1990s, reforms began to be explored to instead elect its members from single-member districts. This effort was successfully pursued in 1997, being approved by the city voters that September. Despite some debate about potentially enlarging the size of the commission, this was not pursued and its membership remained five.

In 2024, Miami voters passed a referendum which amended the city's term limits to create a lifetime prohibition on city commissioners serving more than two full terms. Before this, term limits had only prohibited more than two consecutive terms of service, allowing additional non-consecutive terms. For much of the commission's history, there had been no term limits.

== Current members ==
- Miguel Angel Gabela - Commissioner, district 1 (Republican)
- Damián Pardo - Commissioner, district 2 (Democrat)
- Rolando Escalona - Commissioner, district 3
- Ralph "Rafael" Rosado - Commissioner, district 4 (Republican)
- Christine King - Commissioner, district 5 (Democrat)

== Former members ==
- James H. Gilman (1921–????)
- C. D. Leffler (1921–????)
- J. E. Lummus (1921–????)
- Edward C. Romfh (1921–1925)
- J.I. Wilson (1921–????)
- F. H. Wharton
- Alexander Orr Jr. (1935–1940)
- Orville H. Rigby (1935–????)
- Robert R. Williams (1935–1939)
- Robert L. Floyd
- Leonard K. Thomson
- Perrine Palmer Jr. (1945–????)
- Chelsie J. Senerchia
- Henry L. Balaban
- Randy Christmas (1953–1955)
- George DuBreuil (1955–????)
- Irwin Christie
- David T. Kennedy (1961–1970)
- M. Athalie Range (1966–1971)
- Otis W. Shiver

=== At-large seat 2 ===
- Joe Carollo (1979–1987)
- Victor De Yurre (1987–1995)
- Joe Carollo (1995–1996)
- Tomás Regalado (1996–1997) -redistricted to 4th district in 1997

=== At-large seat 3 ===
- Stephen P. Clark (1963–1967)
- Maurice Ferré (1967–1970)
- J. L. Plummer (1970–1997) –redistricted to 2nd district in 1997

=== At-large seat 4 ===
- Manolo Reboso
- Armando Lacasa
- Miriam Alonso (1989–1993)
- Willy Gort (1993–1997) –redistricted in 1997

=== At-large seat 5 ===
- Edward T. Graham
- Theodore Gibson
- Miller Dawkins (1987–1996)
- Richard Dunn (1996–1997)
- Humberto Hernandez Jr. (1997)
- Thelma Gibson (1997) –redistricted to 3rd district in 1997

=== District 1 ===
- Angel Gonzalez
- Willy Gort (2010–2020)
- Alex Díaz de la Portilla (2020–2023)
- Miguel Ángel Gabela

=== District 2 ===
- J. L. Plummer (1997–1999) –redistricted in 1997 from 1st seat
- Johnny Winton (2000–2006)
- Marc Sarnoff (2006–2015)
- Ken Russell (2015–2022)
- Sabina Covo (2023)
- Damian Pardo (2023–present)

=== District 3 ===
- Thelma Gibson (1997–1998) –redistricted in 1997 from 5th seat
- Humberto Hernandez Jr. (1998)
- Joe Sanchez (1998–2009)
- Frank Carollo (2009–2017)
- Joe Carollo (2017–2025)
- Rolando Escalona (2025–present)

=== District 4 ===
- Tomás Regalado (1997–2009) –redistricted in 1997 from 2nd seat
- Francis Suarez (2009–2017)
- Manolo Reyes (2017–2025)
- Rafael Rosado (2025-)

=== District 5 ===
- Arthur Teele (1998–2005)
- Jeffery L. Allen

== Chair position ==
The council features a chairperson role, held either by a commissioner or the mayor themselves.

Those who have held the position have included:

- Willy Gort
- Christine King (2021–2026)
- Eileen Higgins (2026–present)

== Former vice mayor position ==
The City Commission was previously led by a "vice mayor", elected from among the members of the council on a rotating basis. The vice mayor would serve as acting mayor in the instance of mayoral vacancy.

The post was created in 1958 by the Commission, and was also meant to serve as an official who could assist the mayor in meeting social and public relations obligations. The vice mayor was also tasked with setting policies for the city manager to implement.

=== Vice mayors ===
The following table chronologically lists the tenures of individuals as vice mayor: (#) denotes different instances of a commissioner serving as vice mayor

Vice Mayors of Miami
Name	Tenure	Seat held	Mayor at time
George DuBreuil	1958–1960		Robert King High
Henry L. Balaban	1961–1962		Robert King High
David T. Kennedy	1963		Robert King High
Sidney Aronovitz	1964		Robert King High
Alice Wainwright	1965		Robert King High
Stephen P. Clark (Note: became acting mayor in September 1967 after death in office of Mayor Robert King High)	1966–1967		Robert King High
Irwin Christie	1967–1969		Stephen P. Clark
M. Athalie Range	1970		Stephen P. Clark
J. L. Plummer (1)	1971	3rd	David T. Kennedy
Edward T. Graham	1972	5th	David T. Kennedy
Theodore Gibson (1)	1973	5th	David T. Kennedy
Theodore Gibson (1)	1973	5th	Maurice Ferré (interim)
Theodore Gibson (1)	1973	5th	David T. Kennedy
Manolo Reboso	1974	4th	Maurice Ferré
J. L. Plummer (2)	1975	3rd	Maurice Ferré
Rose Gordon	1976	2nd	Maurice Ferré
Theodore Gibson (2)	1977	5th	Maurice Ferré
Manolo Reboso (2)	1978	4th	Maurice Ferré
J. L. Plummer (3)	1979	3rd	Maurice Ferré
Armando Lacasa	1980	4th	Maurice Ferré
Theodore Gibson (3)	1981	5th	Maurice Ferré
Joe Carollo (1)	1982	2nd	Maurice Ferré
J. L. Plummer (4)	1983	3rd	Maurice Ferré
Demetrio Perez Jr.	1984	4th	Maurice Ferré
Joe Carollo (2)	1985	2nd	Maurice Ferré
Miller Dawkins (1)	1986	5th	Xavier Suarez
Rosario Kennedy	1988	4th	Xavier Suarez
Victor De Yurre (1)	1989	2nd	Xavier Suarez
Miller Dawkins (2)	1990	5th	Xavier Suarez
J. L. Plummer (5)	1991	3rd	Xavier Suarez
Miriam Alonso	1992	4th	Xavier Suarez
Victor De Yurre (2)	1993	2nd	Xavier Suarez
Miller Dawkins (3)	1994	5th	Stephen P. Clark
J. L. Plummer (6)	1995	3rd	Stephen P. Clark
Willy Gort (Note: became acting mayor after death in office of Mayor Stephen P. Clark)	1996	4th	Stephen P. Clark; himself (acting); Joe Carollo
Tomás Regalado	1997		Francis Suarez; Joe Carollo
Humberto Hernandez Jr.	1998		Joe Carollo
Arthur Teele	1998	5th	Joe Carollo

Gallery of Vice Mayors of Miami (partial)
George DuBreuil
(1958–1960)

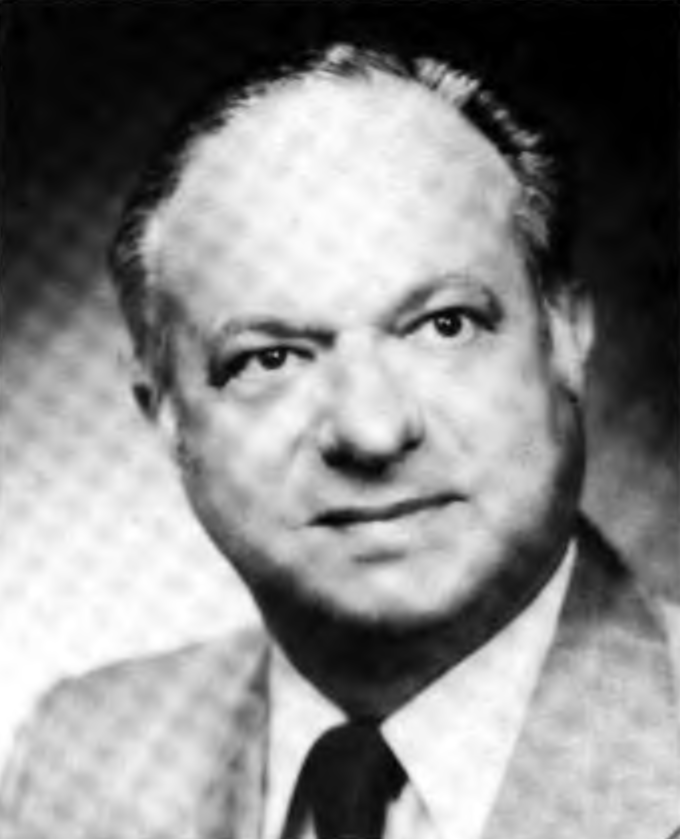
Sidney Aronovitz
(1964)

Stephen P. Clark
(1966)

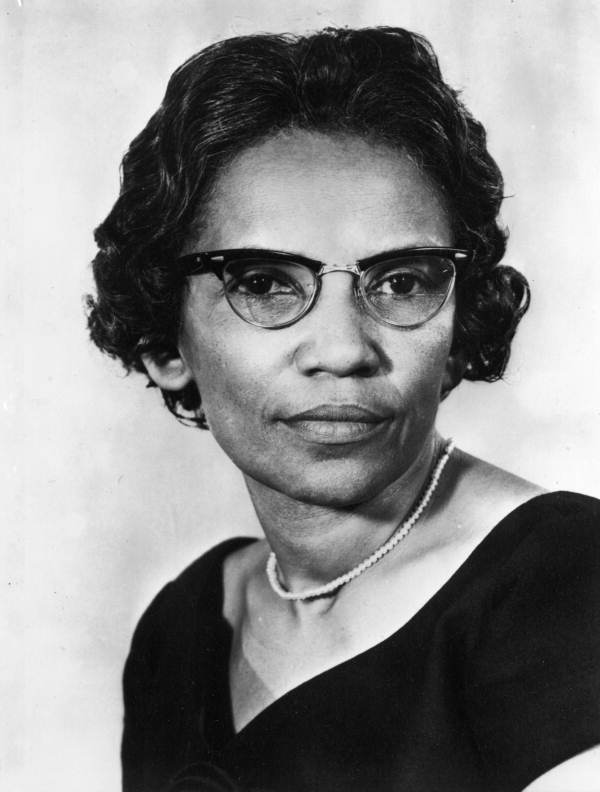
M. Athalie Range
(1970)

J. L. Plummer (1971, 1975, 1979, 1983, 1991, 1995)

Rose Gordon
(1976)

Joe Carollo
(1982; 1985)

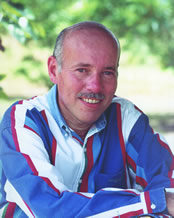
Demetrio Perez Jr.
(1984)

Miriam Alonso
(1992)

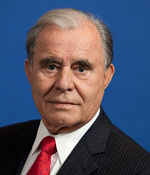
Willy Gort
(1996)

Tomás Regalado
(1997)

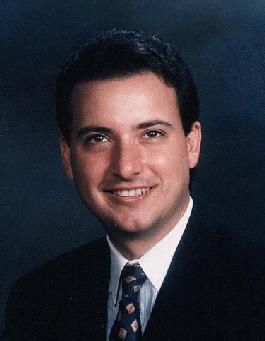
Humberto Hernandez Jr.
(1998)

Arthur Teele
(1998)
