= Manny Diaz (Florida politician) =

Cuban American politician

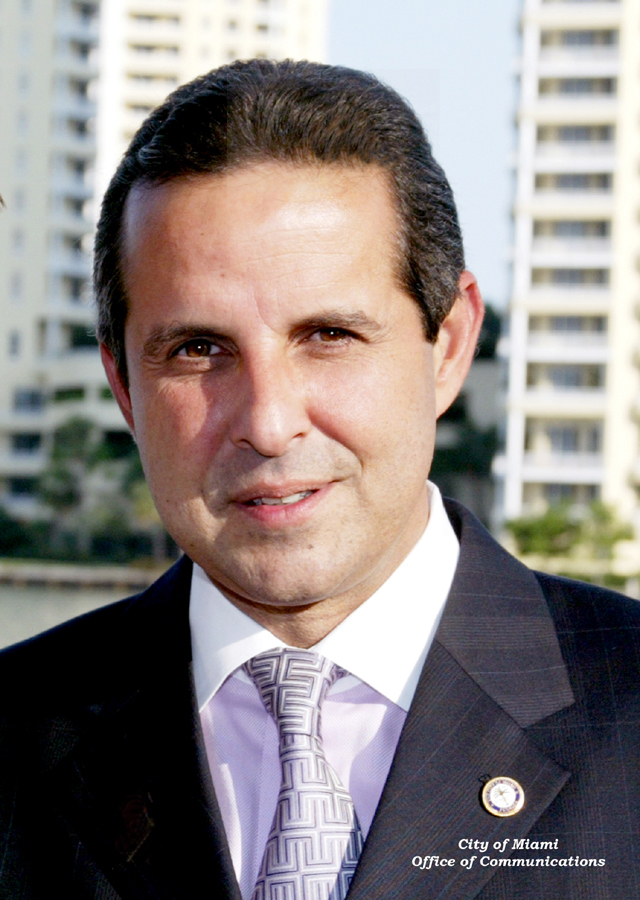
- Official portrait, c. 2001–2005

Chair of the Florida Democratic Party
- In office January 9, 2021 – January 19, 2023
- Preceded by: Terrie Rizzo
- Succeeded by: Nikki Fried

41st Mayor of Miami
- In office November 17, 2001 – November 11, 2009
- Preceded by: Joe Carollo
- Succeeded by: Tomás Regalado

66th President of the United States Conference of Mayors
- In office 2008–2009
- Preceded by: Douglas Palmer
- Succeeded by: Greg Nickels

Personal details
- Born: November 5, 1954 (age 71) Havana, Cuba
- Party: Democratic (before 2000, 2008–present)
- Other political affiliations: Independent (2000–2008)
- Children: 4, including Manny
- Education: Florida International University (BA); University of Miami (JD)

Manuel Alberto Diaz (born November 5, 1954) is a Cuban-American politician who served as the chair of the Florida Democratic Party from 2021 to 2023. From 2001 to 2009, he served as the mayor of Miami, Florida.

== Early life and career ==
Diaz and his mother, Elisa, left Cuba in 1961. He graduated from Belen Jesuit Preparatory School in 1973. He scored the first touchdown in his high school's football history, and was named "Mr. Belén" in his graduating class. In 1977, Díaz received his bachelor's degree in political science from Florida International University. In 1980, he earned his Juris Doctor degree from the University of Miami School of Law.

Diaz's law firm was hired to represent Lázaro Gonzalez in the custody case over his grand-nephew Elián González. Diaz's participation in the trial and presence at the González household during the April 22, 2000, raid propelled him to national prominence.

== Mayoralty ==
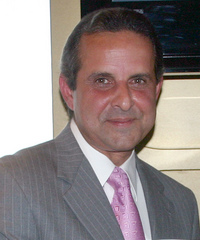
2008 photograph of Diaz

Diaz ran in the 2001 Miami mayoral election as an independent. He and Maurice Ferré were the top candidates in the first round, locking out incumbent mayor Joe Carollo. Diaz won the runoff election, and was re-elected in 2005. As mayor, Díaz remained a partner in the law firm, but stated he would not be able to take new cases.

When he first took office, Miami city government was bankrupt, held junk bond status, and was under a state financial oversight board. Mayor Diaz pursued a vast administrative overhaul that brought with it financial stability, healthy level of financial reserves, continued tax cuts, lowered millage rates, and an A+ bond rating on Wall Street.

Diaz was awarded the "Urban Innovator of the Year" award by the Manhattan Institute in 2004. In 2007, Diaz served on the selection committee for the Rudy Bruner Award for Urban Excellence.

In 2008, Diaz became president of the U.S. Conference of Mayors. As an independent, and a former registered Democrat, Diaz spoke at the 2008 Democratic National Convention and endorsed Obama's presidential bid. Following Obama's election, Diaz was considered for HHS Secretary; the position would ultimately go to Kathleen Sebelius.

During his mayoralty work was undertaken on major public and private projects, many receiving Diaz's backing. Such projects included new highrises in Downtown Miami and the new Marlins Stadium. Diaz also championed a full overhaul of the city's zoning code that was adopted.

== Later career ==
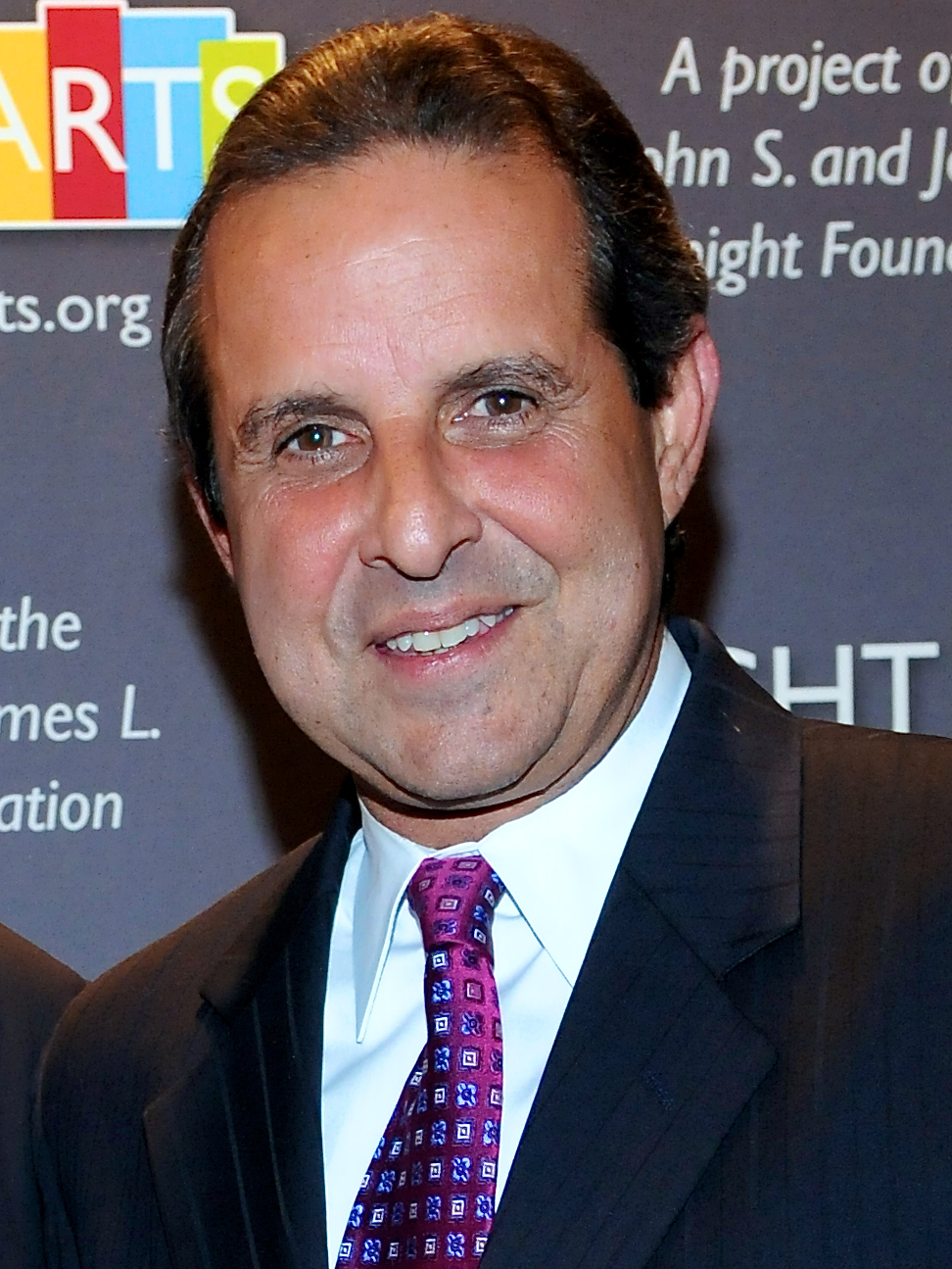
2009 photograph of Diaz

Díaz left office in 2009 because of term limits. In the spring of 2010, Díaz was an IOP Fellow at the Kennedy School of Government at Harvard. Today Díaz is a partner at Lydecker Díaz, LLP in Miami.

On January 22, 2014, Diaz and four other attorneys from his law firm, Lydecker Diaz, filed papers to represent Walmart in its battle to build in Midtown Miami.

In 2018, Diaz was considered a possible candidate in the Democratic primary for the United States House of Representatives in Florida's 27th congressional district, but declined to run.

On November 23, 2020, Diaz declared his campaign for chair of the Florida Democratic party. He has been endorsed by Mike Bloomberg, whom he supported when Bloomberg ran for president. He was elected as Chair of the Florida Democratic Party; he resigned within two years in a letter "replete with excuses" after the "Florida Democrats suffer[ed] some of their worst losses ever" in the 2022 midterm elections.

== Personal life ==
Diaz is married to Robin Smith and has four children. His son, Manny, is the head coach of the football team at Duke University.

== See also ==
- List of mayors of Miami
- Government of Miami

Political offices
Preceded by Joe Carollo	Mayor of Miami; 2001–2009	Succeeded by Tomás Regalado
Party political offices
Preceded by Terrie Rizzo	Chair of the Florida Democratic Party; 2021–2023	Succeeded by Judy Mount; Acting
