= Xavier Suarez =

American politician (born 1949)

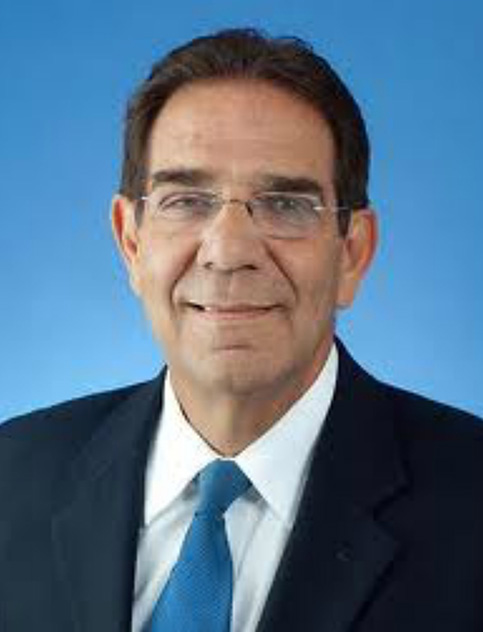
- Official portrait, c. 2010s

35th and 39th Mayor of Miami
- In office November 14, 1997 – March 12, 1998
- Preceded by: Joe Carollo
- Succeeded by: Joe Carollo
- In office November 14, 1985 – November 11, 1993
- Preceded by: Maurice Ferré
- Succeeded by: Stephen P. Clark

Member of the Miami-Dade Board of Commissioners from the 7th district
- In office May 24, 2011 – November 17, 2020
- Preceded by: Carlos A. Giménez
- Succeeded by: Raquel Regalado

Personal details
- Born: Xavier Louis Suarez; May 21, 1949 (age 77) Las Villas, Cuba
- Party: Democratic (before 2010); Republican (2010–2012, 2020–2025); Independent (2012–2020, 2025–present)
- Spouse: Rita Suarez
- Children: 4, including Francis
- Relatives: Alex Mooney (nephew)
- Education: Villanova University (BS); Harvard University (MPP, JD)

Xavier Louis Suarez (born May 21, 1949) is an American politician who twice served as Mayor of Miami (1985–1993 and 1997–1998). He was the first Cuban-born individual to serve as the city's mayor. Suarez latter served as a Miami-Dade county commissioner (2011–2020). He was an unsuccessful candidate in the 1996 Dade County mayoral election, 2020 Miami-Dade County mayoral election, and the 2025 Miami mayoral election.

== Early life and education ==
Suarez was born on May 21, 1949, in Las Villas, Cuba. His father was a college professor. Suarez moved to Florida and attended the Colegio de Belén, but graduated from St. Anselm's Abbey School in 1967. He earned a bachelor's in mechanical engineering from Villanova University in 1971, followed by a Master of Public Policy and Juris Doctor from Harvard University.

After completing his education, Suarez returned to Miami.

== Early political career ==
Suarez ran twice unsuccessfully for seats on the Miami City Commission. Believing incumbent mayor Maurice Ferré to be vulnerable to a challenge, Suarez ran in the 1983 Miami mayoral election. Despite substantial financial backing from wealthy car dealer Norman Braman, Suarez was unsuccessful in unseating the mayor.

== Mayoralties ==
=== First mayoralty (1985–1993) ===
Suarez was first elected Mayor of Miami after running again in 1985, unseating Ferré. Suarez was re-elected in 1987 (fending off challenges from Ferré and Marvin Dunn). He was elected for a third term in 1989, with this third election being for a four-year term.

Suarez was sworn in as mayor on November 13, 1985, succeeding Ferré. He was the first Cuban-born individual serve as the city's mayor.

As mayor, Suarez was famous for keeping blue slips of paper in an office binder on which he recorded neighborhood concerns that had been brought to his attention by individual residents. This included concerns as small and local as an individual pothole. A joke arose in Miami politics that, as mayor, Suarez was more akin to a great public works director.

Suarez (at the time a political independent) endorsed the successful 1986 gubernatorial campaign of endorsed Bob Martinez (a Republican). His endorsement of Martinez came prior to the 1986 Republican gubernatorial primary, with Suarez actively campaigning for him.

After the police shooting of Clement Lloyd, a Black motorcyclist, Suarez personally engaged with a crowd of protesting residents. This gesture earned him praise. According to a March 30, 1993 article in The Miami Herald, "In 1989, [Suarez] won national admiration when he waded through hostile crowds in Overtown during civil disturbances to try to make peace."

Suarez received attention for refusing to greet South African President Nelson Mandela during his 1990 tour of the United States which included a stop in Miami. Suarez was in disagreement with Mandela's comments where he referred to Cuban President Fidel Castro as a "comrade in arms" due to Castro's support for the African National Congress. Suarez faced criticism for his refusal to greet Mandela, which led to a boycott by the local African American community of all Miami tourist and convention facilities until Mandela received an official greeting. Efforts to resolve the dispute failed for months, resulting in an estimated loss of over US$10 million in tourism revenue.

On October 7, 1990, Suarez issued a proclamation declaring "Yahweh ben Yahweh Day" in honor of the leader of the Nation of Yahweh, a religious sect based in Miami. A month later, the group's founder was indicted on charges of conspiracy to commit murder.

Suarez cited the construction of 1,500 affordable homes as one of his "proudest achievements" during his tenure. He was also given the name "pothole Mayor" for his attention to City neighborhoods. In 1993 Suarez got the Latin Builder's Association to donate $150,000 to rebuild the only Catholic elementary school in Overtown.

During his first tenure as mayor, some observers speculated that Suarez had a major future in politics ahead of him. In 1996, Florida International University political science professor Christopher Warren opined that Suarez, however, had failed to demonstrate a strong political drive during his first tenure, remarking, "Suarez never showed himself to be a particularly aggressive leader. He was never someone who had a strong agenda."

Having spent eight years as mayor, and perhaps grown momentarily bored with politics, Suarez opted against seeking re-election in 1993 in order to dedicate more time to his legal practice and his family.

=== Second mayoralty (1997–1998) ===
After leaving office as mayor, Suarez returned to practice law in Miami before he decided to run again for mayor in 1997, challenging incumbent Joe Carollo. Suárez was initially returned to the office, appearing to have won the runoff election by a narrow margin. He was initially returned to the office after the November 1997 election. However, his opponent, Joe Carollo, challenged the election in court. Following a wide-ranging investigation into allegations of election fraud pertaining to absentee ballots, the judge presiding over the case decided to throw out all absentee ballots, effectively handing the election to Carollo and overturning Suárez's victory. The judge found "a pattern of fraudulent, intentional and criminal conduct" involving nearly 400 fraudulent absentee ballots, including votes cast in the names of deceased individuals and felons. While Suárez was not personally implicated, several individuals connected to his campaign were convicted, including campaign volunteer Miguel Amador and supporter Alberto Russi. In total, 55 individuals were charged and 54 were convicted in connection with the fraud, including a city commissioner, his chief of staff, and the staffer's father. A federal appeals court ultimately invalidated the election and declared Carollo the winner without a new vote.

During his brief return to office in 1997, Suarez attracted controversy for erratic conduct that drew widespread media attention and earned him the nickname “Mayor Loco.” His actions included threatening to cut off city advertising to local media outlets, attempting to fire the police chief without proper authority, and making unannounced visits to constituents' homes late at night. A judge eventually barred him from making personnel decisions, citing violations of the city charter. Though never criminally charged, the chaotic period contributed to the perception of instability in city leadership.

== Miami-Dade County Commissioner (2011–2020) ==
Suarez was elected as a Miami-Dade County Commissioner for District 7 on May 24, 2011 and was re-elected by a 44 point margin on August 30, 2016. During his tenure as Commissioner, Suarez continued to advocate for affordable housing, as well as workforce development programs and funding for public transit.

== County mayoral campaigns ==
=== 1996 ===
In 1996, between his two terms as city mayor, Suarez ran unsuccessfully for county mayor. His campaign focused on criticizing the current county commission of misconduct, hoping to tap into voter discontent. However, he received criticism for failing to articulate new solutions to county problems.

=== 2020 ===
Suarez was an unsuccessful candidate in the 2020 election for Mayor of Miami-Dade County. In the first round, Suarez placed fourth with 10.5% of the vote.

== 2025 Miami mayoral campaign ==
In July 2025, Suarez confirmed that he would run again for mayor in the 2025 Miami mayoral election. Suarez was at the time, either an independent or a Republican. He was considered one of the six leading candidates in the thirteen-candidate field, but was eliminated in the primary after receiving only 4.9% of the vote.

His main policies included supporting an expansion of the Miami-Dade Transit "trolley" service; support for a state freeze of property taxes for residences in Miami under the county's median value of $575,000 (a proposal introduced by State Rep. Vicki Lopez); and support for a state takeover of disaster insurance for new affordable housing projects. Suarez also proposed making public transit in Miami fare free. Suarez voiced support for a proposal to amend the city charter to expand the Miami Commission from five seats to nine seats and to move city elections from off-years to even years (coinciding with federal elections).

== Family ==
He was the ninth child and second son of 14 children of Manuel Suarez-Carreno, the first Dean of the School of Engineering at the Universidad Católica de Santo Tomás de Villanueva (St. Thomas of Villanova Catholic University), and Eloisa Gaston. He is married to Rita and they have four children: Francis Xavier Suarez, who became Mayor of Miami in 2017, Olga Marie Vieira, Anna Teresita, and Carolina Suarez. His sister, Lala, is the mother of former U.S. Congressman Alex Mooney of West Virginia.

== See also ==
- List of mayors of Miami
- Government of Miami

Political offices
| Preceded by Maurice Ferré | Mayor of Miami; 1985–1993 | Succeeded by Stephen P. Clark |
| Preceded by Joe Carollo | Mayor of Miami; 1997–1998 | Succeeded by Joe Carollo |
