= Arthur Teele =

American lawyer and politician

- official portrait as city commissioner

Administrator of the Urban Mass Transportation Administration
- In office 1981–1983
- President: Ronald Reagan
- Preceded by: Theodore C. Lutz
- Succeeded by: Ralph L. Stanley

Dade County Commissioner
- In office 1993–1996

Miami City Commissioner
- In office 1998–2005
- Succeeded by: Jeffery L. Allen
- Constituency: district 5

Vice Mayor of Miami
- In office 1998
- Preceded by: Humberto Hernandez Jr.

Personal details
- Born: May 14, 1946
- Died: July 27, 2005 (aged 59)
- Party: Republican

Arthur E. "Art" Teele Jr. (May 14, 1946 – July 27, 2005) was an American lawyer and politician from the Republican Party. In the early 1980s, he served as the head of the Urban Mass Transportation Administration (now known as the Federal Transit Administration) from 1981 to 1983. Born into a wealthy black family in Florida, Teele received an excellent education and became an officer in the US Army, and later had a successful career in private practice and politics. The Miami Herald published claims of legal wrongdoing against Teele during his fight to have a conviction against him overturned, after which he killed himself. Posthumously, his case was appealed and his conviction was overturned, exonerating him of all charges.

Art Teele married Celestra Patton Teele, of whom he had one son Arthur Patton Teele. (Trey) Teele, later married Stephanie K. Teele of whom he was married upon his death.

== Military and legal careers ==
Teele was a law student who went into the military after his graduation. Teele served the US Army as a Judge Advocate General on the personal staff of General Henry Emerson, Commander of the XVIII Airborne Corps at Fort Bragg from July 1975 to June 1977. Teele earned his law degree from Florida State University College of Law.

After his honorable discharge from the US Army, Teele provided pro bono services to the defendants in the Wilmington Ten which was the most prominent civil rights case in America during the 1970s. Teele met with the attorneys for the Wilmington Ten as well as attorneys and administrative staff of North Carolina Attorney General Rufus Edmisten. In 1980, the federal courts ordered a new trial for the Wilmington Ten, and Attorney General Edmisten dropped all charges after hearing appeals from Teele and others permitting the Wilmington Ten to go free.

Returning to the private practice of law in his home state of Florida, Teele became the attorney for Bill France Sr., the founder of NASCAR, before entering politics in Miami. In Europe, Teele consulted with Interpol on investigations into organized crime and international homicide cases.

== Political career ==
In March 1981, President Ronald Reagan appointed Teele to lead the Urban Mass Transportation Administration (UMTA), a position officially known as Administrator of UMTA (now FTA). He served as UMTA Administrator from April 1981 to June 1983.

Teele unsuccessfully ran for mayor of Miami in 1987. In September, Teele disclosed that he had been recently approached by an aide to President Reagan about potentially being appointed to serve as United States Secretary of Transportation (a cabinet post being vacated by Elizabeth Dole). He disclosed that he had declined the position, opting to instead carry forward with his mayoral candidacy, and that he had recommended that the Reagan administration instead consider U.S. Senator Paula Hawkins (of Florida) for the position. Teele ultimately placed third in the election (failing to advance to the runoff), receiving 22.75% of the vote.

official portrait, circa 2004

In September 1990, Teele was elected Dade County Commissioner in Miami, Florida. He was re-elected in March 1993, and served as the Commission's chairman. He resigned from the county commission in 1996 to run for mayor of Dade County. Teele was one of the top two candidates to emerge from the general election, but he was narrowly defeated in a runoff by Alex Penelas. In November 1997, he was elected to a four-year term as a city commissioner for the city of Miami.

Following a controversial investigation and trial, Teele was removed from office by Governor Jeb Bush on March 2, 2005. Although Teele was convicted of corruption by threat against a public servant, the verdict was overturned on appeal after his death by suicide.

== Suicide and tabloid scandal ==
On July 27, 2005, Teele walked into the Miami Herald building and shot himself fatally in the head.

At the time of his death, Teele was a popular politician with a loyal following in Miami-Dade. Teele's conviction stemmed from an incident with a Miami-Dade County detective who had been conducting surveillance as part of a corruption probe. That probe was triggered in part by investigative articles published in the Miami Herald by journalist Oscar J. Corral. That probe had resulted in Teele being charged with ten felony counts of unlawful compensation, with trial set for October 2005. Teele was also under federal indictment for money laundering, mail fraud and wire fraud for allegedly helping a minority company win more than $20 million worth of electrical contracts at Miami International Airport for work that was actually undertaken by a larger non-minority company. Teele faced a possible 20 years in prison if convicted of the federal charges, but an examination of his personal financial records after his death revealed that Teele was not a rich man and was actually in debt for half a million dollars.

On the day of his suicide, the Miami New Times published a cover story on Teele which was based on the report of the corruption probe and detailed alleged dealings with illegal drugs and a transvestite prostitute with a criminal record. Shortly before he shot himself, Teele called Miami Herald columnist Jim DeFede, who taped their conversation. This taping led to the dismissal of DeFede. According to the tape, Teele professed his love for his wife, Stephanie, in a rambling conversation that revealed a spike in his personal anxiety.

=== Conviction overturned and Teele exonerated ===
On April 18, 2007, almost two years after his death, Teele's conviction for corruption by threat against a public servant was overturned by the Florida Third District Court of Appeal. The court allowed the appeal by a deceased individual on the basis that Teele's conviction precluded his wife from making a valid claim for death benefits under the City of Miami's pension plan and other merits of his case.

=== Miami Noir ===
A documentary about Teele's final days that concentrated on his suicide was produced by two University of Miami film students, Josh Miller and Sam Rega. Miller and Rega's student documentary, Miami Noir, was screened at the 2008 Miami International Film Festival. Their documentary re-examined the scandal in the context of political pressures from the Florida State Attorney's Office during Jeb Bush's administration that raised concerns about the motives for the persecution of Art Teele.
