= Stephen P. Clark =

American politician

Stephen Clark
- Clark in 1968

30th and 36th Mayor of Miami
- In office November 11, 1993 – June 4, 1996
- Preceded by: Xavier Suarez
- Succeeded by: Joe Carollo; Willy Gort (acting)
- In office August 31, 1967 – November 25, 1970
- Preceded by: Robert King High; W. E. Master Johnson (acting)
- Succeeded by: David T. Kennedy

2nd and 4th Mayor of Metropolitan Dade County
- In office 1974–1993
- Preceded by: Jack Orr
- Succeeded by: Office abolished Alex Penelas (1996; Miami-Dade County)
- In office November 25, 1970 – October 17, 1972
- Preceded by: Chuck Hall
- Succeeded by: Jack Orr

Member of the Miami City Commission
- In office 1963–1967
- Succeeded by: Maurice Ferré

Personal details
- Born: November 19, 1923 Manhattan, Kansas, U.S.
- Died: June 4, 1996 (aged 72) Miami, Florida, U.S.
- Party: Democratic
- Relatives: Dick Clark (brother)

Stephen Patrick Clark (November 19, 1923 – June 4, 1996) was an American politician who served as Mayor of Metropolitan Dade County (now Miami-Dade County), Florida from 1970 to 1972 and from 1974 to April 1993, when a federal judge abolished the post. He was also Mayor of Miami from 1967 to 1970 and from 1993 to his death from stomach cancer in 1996.

== Early life and family ==
Clark was a brother of Florida state senator Dick Clark.

== Political career ==
In 1993, The Washington Post described Clark as an "old-style, ribbon-cutting politician." Upon his death in 1996, the Miami Herald lauded his political longevity to his penchant for inclusivity and fairness to all communities.

Miami and its surrounding county endured many eventful years over the course of his years as an elected mayor, including race riots, waves of arrivals of Cuban refugees, and hurricanes. Some critics derided him as the "marshmallow" mayor, due to his ability to avoid political damage from controversies and tumult that Miami and the county endured over the course of his career.

=== Miami City Commission (1963–1967) ===
Clark was elected to the Miami City Commission (city council) in 1963. In 1966, Clark began serving as vice mayor (deputy mayor), a position which was rotated between members of the city commission.

=== First tenure as city mayor (1967–1970) ===
After the death-in-office of Mayor Robert King High, as the next-in-line (being vice mayor), Clark ascended to the city's mayoralty. He ran for election to a full term as city mayor later that year, winning election with 26,471 votes (73.95% of the overall vote). He was re-elected in 1969, receiving 17,378 votes (76.81% of the overall vote).

=== Tenures as county mayor (1970–1972; 1974–1993) ===
In 1970, Clark was elected mayor of Metropolitan Dade County (county executive), defeating Maurice Ferré (a former state legislator and Miami city commissioner). He held the position until 1972. From 1974 until 1993, Clark served a second (and longer) stint as county mayor.

=== Second tenure as city mayor (1993–1996) ===
In 1993, Clark won an election to again serve as mayor of the City of Miami, defeating a popular opponent (City Commissioner Miriam Alonso).

== Death and legacy ==
Clark died of stomach cancer at the age of 72 on June 4, 1996. His death came at his residence in Miami with his wife, Teresa, beside him.

The Stephen P. Clark Government Center, the county hall of Miami-Dade County, is named in his honor.

== See also ==
- List of mayors of Miami
- Government of Miami
- History of Miami
- Timeline of Miami

== Sources ==
- Musical Mayors
- "Ex-Mayor of Miami Gets His Job Back". The New York Times.

Political offices
Preceded by Robert King High	Mayor of Miami; 1967–1970	Succeeded by David T. Kennedy
Preceded by Xavier Suarez	Mayor of Miami; 1993–1996	Succeeded by Willy Gort
