= 2008 Miami-Dade County mayoral election =

- August 26, 2008
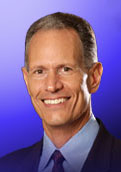

Candidate	Carlos Álvarez	Helen B. Williams
Party	Nonpartisan	Nonpartisan
Popular vote	116,181	60,191
Percentage	65.87%	34.13%
Mayor before election
Carlos Álvarez
Nonpartisan
Elected mayor
Carlos Álvarez
Nonpartisan

The 2008 Miami-Dade County mayoral election took place on August 26, 2008. Incumbent Mayor Carlos Álvarez ran for re-election to a second term. Despite speculation that State House Speaker Marco Rubio would challenge Álvarez for re-election, Rubio ultimately declined to run, leaving Álvarez without a serious competitor. Retired teacher Helen Williams filed to run against Álvarez, but raised little money prior to the election. Álvarez ultimately won re-election in a landslide, receiving 65 percent of the vote. However, Álvarez would not end up serving his full term as Mayor; in 2011, he was recalled by voters.

== Primary election ==
=== Candidates ===
- Carlos Álvarez, incumbent Mayor
- Helen B. Williams, retired teacher

=== Results ===
2004 Miami-Dade County mayoral election
Party	Candidate	Votes	%
Nonpartisan	Carlos Álvarez (incumbent)	116,181	65.87%
Nonpartisan	Helen B. Williams	60,191	34.13%
Total votes		176,372	100.00%
