= 2004 Miami-Dade County mayoral election =

- August 31, 2004; November 2, 2004
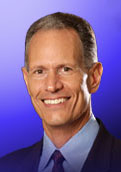

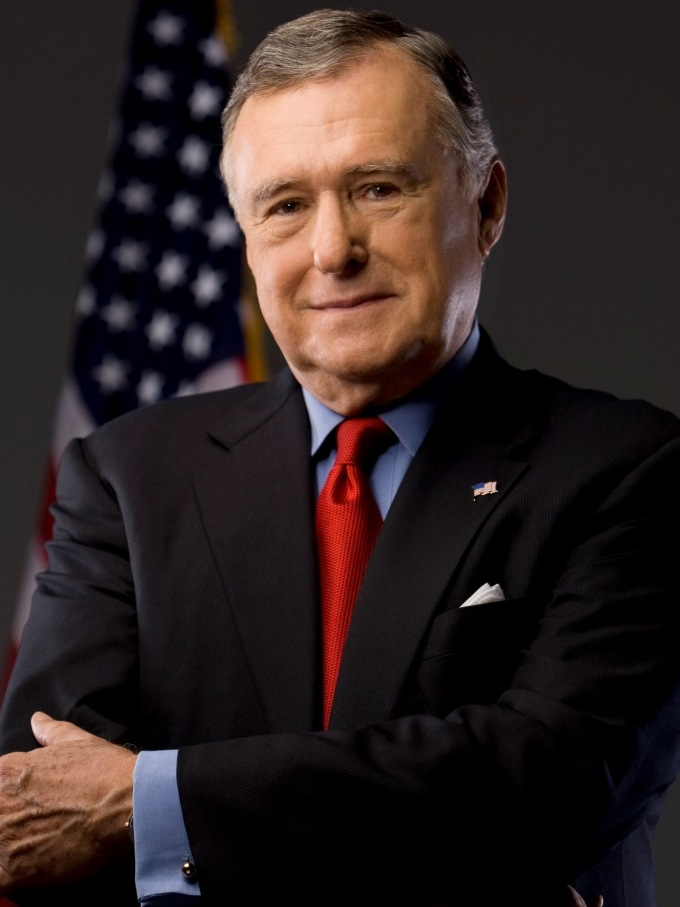

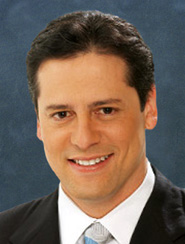
Candidate	Carlos Álvarez	Jimmy Morales
First round	79,902; 27.55%	58,388; 20.13%
Runoff	396,798; 55.20%	322,032; 44.80%
Candidate	Maurice Ferré	Miguel Díaz de la Portilla
First round	51,384; 17.72%	36,725; 13.79%
Runoff	Eliminated	Eliminated
Mayor before election
Alex Penelas
Nonpartisan
Elected mayor
Carlos Álvarez
Nonpartisan

The 2004 Miami-Dade County mayoral election took place on November 2, 2004, following a primary election on August 31, 2004. Incumbent Mayor Alex Penelas was term-limited and could not run for a third consecutive term, instead opting to unsuccessfully run for Senate. Nine candidates ran to succeed Penelas. Carlos Álvarez, the Director of the Miami-Dade Police Department, placed first in the primary, winning 28 percent of the vote. County Commissioner Jimmy Morales defeated former Miami Mayor Maurice Ferré for second place, 20–18 percent, and advanced to the runoff election against Álvarez. Álvarez defeated Morales by a wide margin, winning 55–45 percent.

== Primary election ==
=== Candidates ===
- Carlos Álvarez, Director of the Miami-Dade Police Department
- Jimmy Morales, County Commissioner
- Maurice Ferré, former County Commissioner, former Mayor of Miami, 2001 candidate for Mayor of Miami, 1996 candidate for Mayor of Dade County
- Miguel Díaz de la Portilla, former County Commissioner, 2000 candidate for Mayor
- Jose Cancela, media executive
- Jay Love, businessman, 2000 candidate for Mayor
- Dave Slater, former WPLG traffic reporter, 2000 candidate for Mayor
- Deliverance Charles Blue, minister

=== Results ===
2004 Miami-Dade County mayoral primary election
Party	Candidate	Votes	%
Nonpartisan	Carlos Álvarez	79,902	27.55%
Nonpartisan	Jimmy Morales	58,388	20.13%
Nonpartisan	Maurice Ferré	51,384	17.72%
Nonpartisan	Miguel Díaz de la Portilla	44,319	15.28%
Nonpartisan	Jose Cancela	34,740	11.98%
Nonpartisan	Jay Love	12,752	4.40%
Nonpartisan	Dave Slater	5,155	1.78%
Nonpartisan	Deliverance Charles Blue	3,367	1.16%
Total votes		290,007	100.00%

== Runoff election ==
=== Results ===
2000 Miami-Dade County mayoral runoff election
Party	Candidate	Votes	%
Nonpartisan	Carlos Álvarez	396,798	55.20%
Nonpartisan	Jimmy Morales	322,032	44.80%
Total votes		718,830	100.00%
