= List of Sigma Lambda Beta chapters =

Sigma Lambda Beta is a historically Latino based collegiate fraternity that was established at the University of Iowa in 1986. It has collegiate and alumni chapters that are located throughout the United States and in Puerto Rico and the United Kingdom.

U.S.-based chapters are assigned to one of nine regions:

1. Central (Chapters that reside in Illinois, Indiana, Kentucky, Tennessee, and Wisconsin)
2. East (Chapters that reside in Michigan and Ohio)
3. Midwest (Chapters that reside in Iowa, Kansas, Minnesota, Missouri, and Nebraska)
4. Northeast (Chapters that reside in Massachusetts, New Jersey, New York, Pennsylvania, and Rhode Island)
5. Northwest (Chapters that reside in Idaho, Oregon, and Washington)
6. South (Chapters that reside in Oklahoma and Texas)
7. Southeast (Chapters that reside in Alabama, Florida, Georgia, Louisiana, Mississippi, and South Carolina)
8. Southwest (Chapters that reside in Arizona and Colorado)
9. West (Chapters that reside in California)

== Collegiate chapters ==
Chartered collegiate chapters have received official recognition from the fraternity and are assigned Greek letter chapter names. Unchartered chapters or colonies are in the process of obtaining charter status. In the following collegiate chapters list, active chapters are indicated in bold and its inactive chapters are in italics.

Chapter	Charter date and range	Institution	Location	Region	Status	Ref.
**Alpha**	April 4, 1986	University of Iowa	Iowa City, Iowa	Midwest	Active	
**Beta**	December 6, 1986	Western Illinois University	Macomb, Illinois	Central	Active	
Gamma	December 6, 1986 – 2023	Illinois State University	Bloomington, Indiana	Central	Inactive	
Delta	1987 – xxxx ?	Pontifical Catholic University of Puerto Rico	Ponce, Puerto Rico		Inactive	
**Epsilon**	April 3, 1988	Western Michigan University	Kalamazoo, Michigan	East	Active	
**Zeta**	April 6, 1989	University of Michigan	Ann Arbor, Michigan	East	Active	
**Eta**	August 20, 1989	Northern Illinois University	DeKalb, Illinois	Central	Active	
**Theta**	December 1, 1989	Indiana University Bloomington	Bloomington, Indiana	Central	Active	
**Iota**	September 9, 1990	Colorado State University	Fort Collins, Colorado	Southwest	Active	
**Kappa**	April 14, 1991	University of Illinois Urbana-Champaign	Champaign, Illinois	Central	Active	
**Lambda**	April 14, 1991	University of Colorado Boulder	Boulder, Colorado	Southwest	Active	
**Mu**	March 31, 1991	University of Houston	Houston, Texas	South	Active	
Nu	1991–xxxx ?	Harvard University	Cambridge, Massachusetts	Northeast	Inactive	
Xi	May 17, 1992 – 20xx ?	University of Illinois Chicago	Chicago, Illinois	Central	Inactive	
**Omicron**	April 12, 1992	Iowa State University	Ames, Iowa	Midwest	Active	
Pi	April 4, 1992 – xxxx ?	Stony Brook University	Stony Brook, New York	Northeast	Inactive	
**Rho**	April 16, 1992	Central Michigan University	Mount Pleasant, Michigan	East	Active	
Sigma	1992–xxxx ?	Illinois Institute of Technology	Chicago, Illinois	Central	Inactive	
**Tau**	August 12, 1992	California State University, Dominguez Hills	Carson, California	West	Active	
Upsilon	April 3, 1993 – xxxx ?	Purdue University Northwest	Hammond, Indiana	Central	Inactive	
Phi	April 9, 1994 – 202x ?	Kansas State University	Manhattan, Kansas	Midwest	Inactive	
Chi	November 20, 1992 – 202x ?	Pace University	New York City, New York	Northeast	Inactive	
**Psi**	April 8, 1995	University of South Florida	Tampa, Florida	Southeast	Active	
**Omega**		Chapter Eternal			Memorial	
**Alpha Alpha**	August 23, 1996	Purdue University	West Lafayette, Indiana	Central	Active	
Beta Alpha	January 26, 1996 – 20xx ?	State University of New York at Old Westbury	Old Westbury, New York	Northeast	Inactive	
Gamma Alpha	July 10, 1996 – xxxx ?	Johnson & Wales University	Providence, Rhode Island	Northeast	Inactive	
Delta Alpha	July 10, 1996 – xxxx ?	Kean University	Union, New Jersey	Northeast	Inactive	
**Epsilon Alpha**	March 12, 1995	University of Toledo	Toledo, Ohio	East	Active	
Zeta Alpha	October 31, 1995	University of Wisconsin–Parkside	Kenosha, Wisconsin	Central	Inactive	
**Eta Alpha**	November 22, 1996	University of Texas at Austin	Austin, Texas	South	Active	
Theta Alpha	June 3, 1997 – 20xx ?	University of California, Irvine	Irvine, California	West	Inactive	
Iota Alpha	1995–xxxx ?	New York City College of Technology	New York City, New York	Northeast	Inactive	
**Kappa Alpha**	September 20, 1997	University of Arizona	Tucson, Arizona	Southwest	Active	
Lambda Alpha	August 25, 1996 – 20xx ?	San Jose State University	San Jose, California	West	Inactive	
**Mu Alpha**	1997–xxxx ?	Eastern Michigan University	Ypsilanti, Michigan	East	Active	
Nu Alpha	November 24, 1996 – 20xx ?	Southern Illinois University Carbondale	Carbondale, Illinois	Central	Inactive	
Xi Alpha	February 21, 1998 – 20xx ?	Truman State University	Kirksville, Missouri	Midwest	Inactive	
**Omicron Alpha**	November 6, 1997	Pennsylvania State University	State College, Pennsylvania	Northeast	Active	
**Pi Alpha**	November 24, 1996	Michigan State University	Lansing, Michigan	East	Active	
**Rho Alpha**	May 8, 1997	Florida State University	Tallahassee, Florida	Southeast	Active	
**Sigma Alpha**	May 29, 1997	DePaul University	Chicago, Illinois	Central	Active	
Tau Alpha	June 25, 1999 – 20xx ?	Rutgers University–New Brunswick	New Brunswick, New Jersey	Northeast	Inactive	
Upsilon Alpha	June 25, 1999 – xxxx ?	State University College at Buffalo	Buffalo, New York	Northeast	Inactive	
**Phi Alpha**	June 25, 1999	University of Nebraska–Lincoln	Lincoln, Nebraska	Midwest	Active	
**Chi Alpha**	September 21, 1997	University of Texas at Arlington	Arlington, Texas	South	Active	
**Psi Alpha**	December 7, 1999	Santa Clara University	Santa Clara, California	West	Active	
Omega Alpha	December 6, 1999 – 202x ?	University of Texas Rio Grande Valley	Edinburg, Texas	South	Inactive	
**Alpha Beta**	May 20, 2000	University of Minnesota	Minneapolis, Minnesota	Midwest	Active	
**Beta Beta**	May 20, 2000	Loyola Marymount University	Los Angeles, California	West	Active	
**Gamma Beta**	May 17, 2000	Marquette University	Milwaukee, Wisconsin	Central	Active	
**Delta Beta**	September 30, 2000	University of Nebraska Omaha	Omaha, Nebraska	Midwest	Active	
**Epsilon Beta**	January 16, 1999	Texas Tech University	Lubbock, Texas	South	Active	
**Zeta Beta**	January 30, 1999	University of Florida	Gainesville, Florida	Southeast	Active	
**Eta Beta**	April 18, 1998	Texas A&M University	College Station, Texas	South	Active	
**Theta Beta**	April 29, 2001	University of North Texas	Denton, Texas	South	Active	
Iota Beta	2000–20xx ?	Loyola University Chicago	Chicago, Illinois	Central	Inactive	
**Kappa Beta**	February 23, 2002	California State University, Long Beach	Long Beach, California	West	Active	
Lambda Beta	February 23, 2002 – 20xx ?	Sam Houston State University	Huntsville, Texas	South	Inactive	
Mu Beta	April 20, 2002 – 20xx ?	University of Kansas	Lawrence, Kansas	Midwest	Inactive	
Nu Beta	June 23, 2002 – 20xx ?	Bowling Green State University	Bowling Green, Ohio	East	Inactive	
Xi Beta	November 23, 2002 – 20xx ?	Hofstra University	Hempstead, New York	Northeast	Inactive	
Omicron Beta	2002–20xx ?	Occidental College	Los Angeles, California	West	Inactive	
**Pi Beta**	December 12, 2002	California State University, Los Angeles	Los Angeles, California	West	Active	
**Rho Beta**	July 31, 2002	Wichita State University	Wichita, Kansas	Midwest	Active	
**Sigma Beta**	2002	Texas State University	San Marcos, Texas	South	Active	
Tau Beta	2002–20xx ?	Northeastern Illinois University	Chicago, Illinois	Central	Inactive	
Upsilon Beta	October 27, 2003– 20xx ?	University of Northern Colorado	Greeley, Colorado	Southwest	Inactive	
**Phi Beta**	March 3, 2001	University of Washington	Seattle, Washington	Northwest	Active	
**Chi Beta**	July 29, 2004	Arizona State University	Tempe, Arizona	Southwest	Active	
Psi Beta	July 29, 2004 – 202x ?	Wayne State University	Detroit, Michigan	East	Inactive	
Omega Beta	July 29, 2004 – 2017	Miami University	Oxford, Ohio	East	Inactive	
**Alpha Gamma**	November 4, 2004	Grand Valley State University	Allendale, Michigan	East	Active	
**Beta Gamma**	May 31, 2003	University of Idaho	Moscow, Idaho	Northwest	Active	
**Gamma Gamma**	April 9, 2003	University of Central Florida	Orlando, Florida	Southeast	Active	
Delta Gamma	February 3, 2006 – 20xx ?	Florida A&M University	Tallahassee, Florida	Southeast	Inactive	
**Epsilon Gamma**	December 31, 1991	Prairie View A&M University	Prairie View, Texas	South	Active	
**Zeta Gamma**	June 11, 2006	University of Nebraska at Kearney	Kearney, Nebraska	Midwest	Active	
**Eta Gamma**	2006–20xx ?; November 22, 2015	University of Oklahoma	Norman, Oklahoma	South	Active	
Theta Gamma	April 6, 2006 – 20xx ?	University of Alabama	Tuscaloosa, Alabama	Southeast	Inactive	
Iota Gamma	October 12, 2006 – xxxx ?	New Jersey Institute of Technology	Newark, New Jersey	Northeast	Inactive	
**Kappa Gamma**	October 27, 2004	California State University, Northridge	Northridge, Los Angeles, California	West	Active	
**Lambda Gamma**	April 2, 2007	University of California, Santa Cruz	Santa Cruz, California	West	Active	
**Mu Gamma**	July 14, 2007	University of California, Davis	Davis, California	West	Active	
**Nu Gamma**	April 15, 2008	University of Houston–Downtown	Houston, Texas	South	Active	
Xi Gamma	April 23, 2004 – 20xx ?	Texas Southern University	Houston, Texas	South	Inactive	
**Omicron Gamma**	May 1, 2008	Brooklyn College	Brooklyn, New York	Northeast	Active	
**Pi Gamma**	March 9, 2009	Eastern Washington University	Cheney, Washington	Northwest	Active	
Rho Gamma	March 29, 2009 – 202x ?	University of Tampa	Tampa, Florida	Southeast	Inactive	
**Sigma Gamma**	May 13, 2009	University of California, Santa Barbara	Santa Barbara, California	West	Active	
**Tau Gamma**	April 11, 2009	Boise State University	Boise, Idaho	Northwest	Active	
**Upsilon Gamma**	April 17, 2009	University of Denver	Denver, Colorado	Southwest	Active	
Phi Gamma	April 25, 2009 – 20xx ?	California State University, Sacramento	Sacramento, California	West	Inactive	
Chi Gamma	February 27, 2007 – 20xx ?	University of Miami	Miami, Florida	Southeast	Inactive	
**Psi Gamma**	February 27, 2010	San Diego State University	San Diego, California	West	Active	
**Omega Gamma**	February 1, 2010	University of Southern California	Los Angeles, California	West	Active	
**Alpha Delta**	February 27, 2010	Texas A&M University–Kingsville	Kingsville, Texas	South	Active	
**Beta Delta**	February 27, 2010	Rutgers University–Newark	Newark, New Jersey	Northeast	Active	
Gamma Delta	February 27, 2010 – 20xx ?	Sonoma State University	Sonoma, California	West	Inactive	
**Delta Delta**	February 27, 2010	University of Wisconsin–Madison	Madison, Wisconsin	Central	Active	
Epsilon Delta	July 15, 2010 – 20xx ?	Columbia University	New York City, New York	Northeast	Inactive	
Zeta Delta	October 10, 2011	Kutztown University	Kutztown, Pennsylvania	Northeast	Inactive	
Eta Delta	March 5, 2011 – 20xx ?	Ohio University	Athens, Ohio	East	Inactive	
**Theta Delta**	March 5, 2011	Florida International University	Miami, Florida	Southeast	Active	
Iota Delta	March 5, 2011 – 20xx ?	Binghamton University	Binghamton, New York	Northeast	Inactive	
Kappa Delta	March 5, 2011 – 202x ?	California State University, San Bernardino	San Bernardino, California	West	Inactive	
**Lambda Delta**	March 5, 2011	University of Texas at San Antonio	San Antonio, Texas	South	Active	
**Mu Delta**	June 25, 2011	Southern Methodist University	Dallas, Texas	South	Active	
**Nu Delta**	June 25, 2011	University of California, Los Angeles	Los Angeles, California	West	Active	
**Xi Delta**	June 25, 2011	Metropolitan State University of Denver	Denver, Colorado	Southwest	Active	
**Omicron Delta**	April 21, 2012	Washington State University	Pullman, Washington	Northwest	Active	
Pi Delta	May 15, 2012 – 20xx ?	University of California, Riverside	Riverside, California	West	Inactive	
**Rho Delta**	July 12, 2012	Georgia Southern University	Statesboro, Georgia	Southeast	Active	
**Sigma Delta**	July 12, 2012	Florida Gulf Coast University	Fort Myers, Florida	Southeast	Active	
Tau Delta	201x ? – 20xx ?	Fairleigh Dickinson University	Teaneck, New Jersey	Northeast	Inactive	
Upsilon Delta	July 12, 2012 – 20xx ?	Lewis University	Romeoville, Illinois	Central	Inactive	
**Phi Delta**	February 23, 2013	Stephen F. Austin State University	Nacogdoches, Texas	South	Active	
**Chi Delta**	February 23, 2013	Mississippi State University	Mississippi State, Mississippi	Southeast	Active	
Psi Delta	201x ?– 202x ?	Ohio State University	Columbus, Ohio	East	Inactive	
Omega Delta	October 14, 2013 – 20xx ?	University of New Haven	West Haven, Connecticut	Northeast	Inactive	
Alpha Epsilon	February 17, 2014	City College of New York	New York City, New York	Northeast	Inactive	
**Beta Epsilon**	February 17, 2014	Oklahoma State University	Stillwater, Oklahoma	South	Active	
**Gamma Epsilon**	February 17, 2014	Texas A&M International University	Laredo, Texas	South	Active	
Delta Epsilon	February 17, 2014 – 20xx ?	Millikin University	Decatur, Illinois	Central	Inactive	
Epsilon Epsilon	February 17, 2014 – 20xx ?	Huston–Tillotson University	Austin, Texas	South	Inactive	
Zeta Epsilon	January 13, 2015 – 20xx ?	University of South Carolina	Columbia, South Carolina	Southeast	Inactive	
Eta Epsilon	January 14, 2015 – 20xx ?	West Chester University	West Chester, Pennsylvania	East	Inactive	
Theta Epsilon	January 15, 2015 – 2022	The College of New Jersey	Ewing Township, New Jersey	Northeast	Inactive	
Iota Epsilon	February 9, 2015 – 20xx ?	University of Texas at Dallas	Dallas, Texas	South	Inactive	
Kappa Epsilon	May 13, 2015 – 202x ?	University of Texas at El Paso	El Paso, Texas	South	Inactive	
Lambda Epsilon	March 19, 2016 – 20xx ?	Northwestern University	Evanston, Illinois	Central	Inactive	
**Mu Epsilon**	May 1, 2015	University of North Texas at Dallas	Dallas, Texas	South	Active	
Nu Epsilon	July 29, 2016 – 20xx ?	San Francisco State University	San Francisco, California	West	Inactive	
**Xi Epsilon**	June 6, 2017	University of Oregon	Eugene, Oregon	Northwest	Active	
**Omicron Epsilon**	September 12, 2017	St. Mary's University, Texas	San Antonio, Texas	South	Active	
**Pi Epsilon**	August 14, 2018	Creighton University	Omaha, Nebraska	Midwest	Active	
**Rho Epsilon**	October 20, 2018	Valdosta State University	Valdosta, Georgia	Southeast	Active	
**Sigma Epsilon**	April 2, 2019	Dickinson College	Carlisle, Pennsylvania	Northeast	Active	
**Tau Epsilon**	June 11, 2019	California State Polytechnic University, Pomona	Pomona, California	West	Active	
**Upsilon Epsilon**	June 11, 2019	Ferris State University	Big Rapids, Michigan	East	Active	
Phi Epsilon	July 16, 2019 – 202x ?	Saint Leo University	St. Leo, Florida	Southeast	Inactive	
Chi Epsilon	April 30, 2020	Eastern Kentucky University	Richmond, Kentucky	Central	Inactive	
**Psi Epsilon**	November 10, 2020	University of Illinois at Springfield	Springfield, Illinois	Central	Active	
**Omega Epsilon**	May 11, 2021	California State University, Fullerton	Fullerton, California	West	Active	
**Alpha Zeta**	February 8, 2022	Montclair State University	Montclair, New Jersey	Northeast	Active	
**Beta Zeta**	April 12, 2022	Coe College	Cedar Rapids, Iowa	Midwest	Active	
**Gamma Zeta**	June 8, 2022	Bradley University	Peoria, Illinois	Central	Active	
**Delta Zeta**	January 8, 2025	Elmhurst University	Elmhurst, Illinois	Central	Active	
**Epsilon Zeta**	April 28, 2025	Louisiana State University	Baton Rouge, Louisiana	Southeast	Active	
**Zeta Zeta**	January 23, 2026	University of Kentucky	Lexington, Kentucky	Central	Active	
**Eta Zeta**	May 3, 2026	Dartmouth College	Hanover, New Hampshire	Northeast	Active	
		University of Alabama at Birmingham	Birmingham, Alabama	Southeast	Colony	
		Washburn University	Topeka, Kansas	Midwest	Colony	
		Austin Peay State University	Clarksville, Tennessee	Central	Colony	

== Alumni chapters ==
Sigma Lambda Beta has alumni networks (consist of alumni of multiple collegiate chapters) and alumni association (consists of alumni of one collegiate chapter). In the following chapter list, active chapters are indicated in bold and its inactive chapters are in italics.

Networks	Location	Status	Ref.
Alamo City Alumni Network	Alamo, Texas	Inactive	
Aloha Alumni Network	Hawaii	Inactive	
**Alumni Network of West Michigan**	Grand Rapids, Michigan	Active	
**Arizona Alumni Network**	Phoenix, Arizona	Active	
**Atlanta Alumni Network**	Atlanta, Georgia	Active	
**Austin Alumni Network**	Austin, Texas	Active	
Boise Alumni Network	Boise, Idaho	Inactive	
**Central Indiana Alumni Network**	Indianapolis, Indiana	Active	
**Chicago Alumni Network**	Chicago, Illinois	Active	
Cleveland Area Alumni Network	Cleveland, Ohio	Inactive	
**Dallas/Ft. Worth Alumni Network**	Dallas, Texas	Active	
**Detroit Metro Alumni Network**	Detroit, Michigan	Active	
**El Paso Alumni Network**	El Paso, Texas	Active	
**Heartland Alumni Network**	Wichita, Kansas	Active	
High Plains Alumni Network		Inactive	
**Houston Alumni Network**	Houston, Texas	Active	
Long Island Alumni Network	Long Island, New York	Inactive	
**Los Angeles Alumni Network**	Los Angeles, California	Active	
McAllen Alumni Network	McAllen, Texas	Inactive	
**Michigan Capitol Area Alumni Network**	Lanshing, Michigan	Active	
**Mid-Atlantic Alumni Network**	Washington, D.C.	Active	
Military Alumni Network		Inactive	
**Minnesota Alumni Network**	Minnesota	Active	
**New England Alumni Network**	Boston, Massachusetts	Active	
**New Jersey Alumni Network**	New Jersey	Active	
**New York City Alumni Network**	New York City, New York	Active	
**Northern California Alumni Network**	San Francisco, California	Active	
**Northwest Ohio Alumni Network**	Toledo, Ohio	Active	
**Oklahoma Alumni Network**	Oklahoma City, Oklahoma	Active	
**Orlando Metro Alumni Network**	Orlando, Florida	Active	
**Pennsylvania Alumni Network**	Pennsylvania	Active	
Puerto Rico Alumni Network	San Juan, Puerto Rico	Inactive	
**Quad Cities Alumni Network**	Moline, Illinois	Active	
Rocky Mountain Alumni Network	Colorado	Inactive	
**San Antonio Alumni Network**	San Antonio, Texas	Active	
San Diego Alumni Network	San Diego, California	Inactive	
Seattle Alumni Network	Seattle, Washington	Inactive	
Southern Arizona Alumni Network	Arizonza	Inactive	
Southwest Michigan Alumni Network	Kalamazoo, Michigan	Inactive	
**Tampa Bay Alumni Network**	Tampa Bay, Florida	Active	
United Kingdom Alumni Network	United Kingdom	Inactive	
Wisconsin Alumni Network	Wisconsin	Inactive	
