= Renier Díaz de la Portilla =

American politician

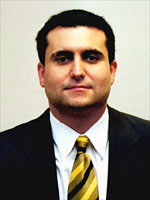

Member of the Florida House of Representatives from the 115th district
- In office January 26, 2000 – November 5, 2002
- Preceded by: Alex Díaz de la Portilla
- Succeeded by: Juan-Carlos Planas

Personal details
- Born: April 29, 1971 (age 55) Miami, Florida, U.S.
- Relations: Miguel Díaz de la Portilla (brother); Alex Díaz de la Portilla (brother)
- Education: Florida International University (BS); Cornell University (MPA); Nova Southeastern University (JD)

Renier Díaz de la Portilla (born April 29, 1971) was a member of the Florida House of Representatives as a Republican from 2000 to 2002 for District 115.

In January 2000, he replaced his brother, Alex Díaz de la Portilla, in the Florida House. He ran for the State House again in 2012, but lost the Republican primary to Manny Díaz Jr. He previously served two stints on the Miami-Dade County School Board (1996–1998 and 2006–2012). Díaz de la Portilla earned an undergraduate degree from Florida International University, a masters from Cornell University, and a law degree from Nova Southeastern University. In 2022, he ran for Judge of the Miami-Dade County Court, but lost the primary.

Florida House of Representatives
Preceded by Alex Díaz de la Portilla	Member of the Florida House of Representatives from the 115th district 2000–2002	Succeeded by Juan-Carlos Planas
