= Carlos Manrique =

American politician

Member of the Florida House of Representatives from the 115th district
- In office November 3, 1992 – November 8, 1994
- Preceded by: Mario Díaz-Balart
- Succeeded by: Alex Díaz de la Portilla

Personal details
- Born: November 10, 1959 (age 66) Havana, Cuba

Carlos Andres Manrique (born November 10, 1959, in Havana, Cuba) was a member of the Florida House of Representatives as a Republican from 1992 to 1994 for District 115.

He graduated from Belen Jesuit Preparatory School in Miami in June 1978. He was the legislative aide to Representative Javier Souto for four years when he ran for State Representative the first time in 1988 against Mario Díaz-Balart. In 1994, he lost his re-election bid to Alex Diaz de la Portilla. In 2004, Manrique ran for State House seat 114 but lost that election in the Republican primary.

Florida House of Representatives
Preceded by Mario Díaz-Balart	Member of the Florida House of Representatives from the 115th district 1992–1994	Succeeded by Alex Díaz de la Portilla
