= Jimmy Morales (disambiguation) =

Jimmy Morales (born 1969) was president of Guatemala from 2016 to 2020.

Jimmy, Jim or Jaime Morales may also refer to:

- Jaime Morales Carazo (born 1936), vice president of Nicaragua in 2009–2012
- Jimmy Morales (American politician), politician in the U.S. state of Florida
- Jim Morales, a character in French animated TV series Code Lyoko, see List of Code Lyoko characters#Jim Morales

== See also ==
- Tnte. FAP Jaime Montreuil Morales Airport, an airport in Chimbote, Peru
