= Tim Murphy (Florida politician) =

American politician (born 1946)

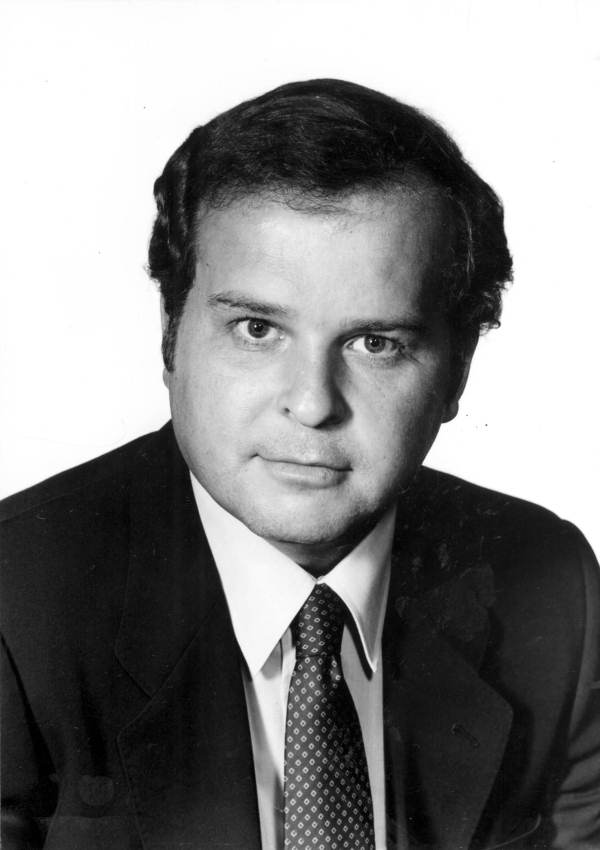

Member of the Florida House of Representatives from the 115th district
- In office November 2, 1982 – November 6, 1984
- Preceded by: Jim Brodie
- Succeeded by: Javier Souto

Personal details
- Born: September 30, 1946 (age 79) Topeka, Kansas, U.S.
- Party: Democratic
- Education: University of Georgia (A.B.); Washington and Lee University School of Law (J.D.); Harvard Law School (LL.M.)
- Occupation: Attorney

Military service
- Allegiance: United States
- Branch/service: United States Air Force
- Years of service: 1971–1975

Tim Murphy (born September 30, 1946) is an American politician in the state of Florida. A member of the Democratic Party, he served as a member of the Florida House of Representatives from the 115th district from 1982 to 1984.

== Life and career ==
Murphy is a former prosecutor.

In 1982, Murphy was elected to represent the 115th district of the Florida House of Representatives, succeeding Jim Brodie. He served until 1984, when he was succeeded by Javier Souto.
