= Florida's 36th Senate district =

American legislative district

Florida's 36th State Senate district
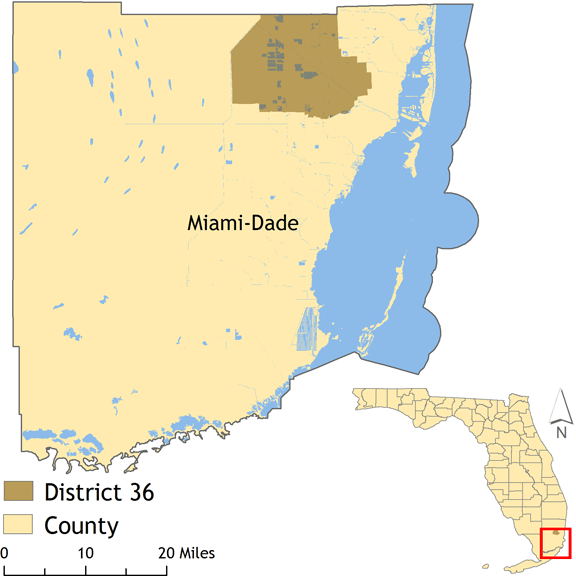
Senator
Ileana Garcia; R–Miami

Florida's 36th Senate district elects one member to the Florida State Senate. It contains parts of Miami-Dade County.

== Members ==
- Alex Díaz de la Portilla (2002–2010)
- Miguel Díaz de la Portilla (2010–2012)
- René García (2016–2018)
- Manny Díaz Jr. (2018–2022)
- Ileana Garcia (since 2022)
