= Miguel Díaz de la Portilla =

American politician (born 1963)

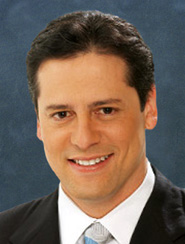

Member of the Florida Senate
- In office November 2, 2010 – November 8, 2016
- Preceded by: Alex Díaz de la Portilla
- Succeeded by: Frank Artiles
- Constituency: 36th district (2010–2012); 40th district (2012–2016)

Member of the Miami-Dade County Commission from the 11th District
- In office April 20, 1993 – October 17, 2000
- Preceded by: District established
- Succeeded by: Joe A. Martinez

Personal details
- Born: January 30, 1963 (age 63) Miami, Florida, U.S.
- Party: Republican
- Relations: Alex Díaz de la Portilla (brother); Renier Díaz de la Portilla (brother)
- Children: 5
- Education: University of Miami (BA, JD)
- Profession: Attorney at Gunster, Yoakley & Stewart

Miguel Díaz de la Portilla (born January 30, 1963) is a Cuban-American attorney and politician from Florida. A Republican, he served in the Florida Senate from 2010 to 2016, representing parts of Miami, Coral Gables, and the surrounding area. Prior to that, he was a member of the Miami-Dade County Commission from 1993 to 2000.

== Early life and education ==
Díaz de la Portilla's great-grandfather served in the Cuban Senate, while two of his great-uncles served simultaneously in the Cuban House of Representatives. A graduate of Miami's Belen Jesuit Preparatory School, Díaz de la Portilla went on to earn his bachelor's and law degrees at the University of Miami.

He is one of the four children of Cuban exiles Miguel Díaz Isalgué and Fabiola Pura de la Portilla García. Díaz de la Portilla's two brothers, Alex and Renier, are also Miami-Dade politicians. Alex preceded Miguel in the Florida Senate (2000–2010), and previously served in the Florida House of Representatives (1993–2000). Renier served two stints on the Miami-Dade County School Board (1996–1998 and 2006–2012), and one term in the Florida House (2000–2002).

Díaz de la Portilla has two sons and one daughter from his first marriage to María Feito. He lives in Coral Gables, Florida, with his wife Elinette Ruiz-Díaz de la Portilla, also a Land Use and Zoning Attorney, and the couple's two daughters. He has a black belt in Brazilian jiu-jitsu.

== Miami-Dade County Commission ==
Díaz de la Portilla's career in public service began in 1993 when he was elected to the Miami-Dade County Commission from a new Hispanic-majority district. The district was created after a federal court ruled in 1992 that the county's system of electing its nine commissioners at-large violated the Voting Rights Act, and ordered special elections to elect a new, 13-member commission elected from single-member districts.

On the County Commission, Díaz de la Portilla chaired the transportation committee, and also served as the commission's chair. Among his legislative initiatives were the creation of the county's Office of the Inspector General, the establishment of the Miami-Dade County Expressway Authority, and reforms to land use policy and the zoning process.

In 2000, Díaz de la Portilla opted to run for Miami-Dade County Mayor rather than re-election. He lost to incumbent Mayor Alex Penelas in the first-round nonpartisan primary, 51.6 to 20.9%. He again ran unsuccessful for that office in 2004.

== Florida Senate ==
In 2010, Díaz de la Portilla was elected to the Florida Senate from the 36th district, which encompassed parts of Miami, Coral Gables, and the surrounding area, without general election opposition. Decennial redistricting renumbered his seat the 40th, and he was re-elected unopposed in 2012 and 2014.

When the Florida Environmental Regulation Commission signed off on controversial limits for toxic compounds that can go into Florida's surface waters, Díaz de la Portilla called on Governor Scott to do a do-over and reconsider their position.

In 2014, Díaz de la Portilla was downgraded to a "F rating" by the National Rifle Association of America. On February 19, 2016, USF Executive Director and NRA Past President Marion P. Hammer sent a "Florida Alert!" to USF & NRA Members and Friends regarding de la Portilla's actions. Portilla rejected several key gun bills including HB4001, HB163, and SB68.

When dealing with campus carry, Díaz de la Portilla took meetings with university presidents, college police chiefs, faculty members, and students from around the state. All of them voiced their opposition to the bill. It's not clear whether the bills would have passed had Díaz de la Portilla allowed them to come up for vote, but there were 26 Republicans and 14 Democrats in the Senate, and approval for either measure would have required only a simple majority. In an interview with Sun Sentinel reporter Dan Sweeney, Díaz de la Portilla stated, "I don't think I'm an anti-gun guy. I'm a pro-common sense guy."

In April 2016, Díaz de la Portilla was recognized nationally by the American Psychiatric Association for championing efforts to address the need to improve mental health services in the Criminal Justice system in the state of Florida.

Court-ordered redistricting in 2015 significantly altered the 37th district, making it more Democratic. Díaz de la Portilla lost re-election in 2016 to Democratic state Representative José Javier Rodríguez in the 2016 general election, 48.9 to 45.6%.

== Electoral history ==
=== County elections, 1993-2004 ===
March 15, 1993 Nonpartisan Primary, Dade County Commission District 11
| Candidate | Votes | % |
|---|---|---|
| Joe Garcia | 2,917 | 29.4 |
| Miguel Díaz de la Portilla | 1,927 | 19.4 |
| Pozo | 1,748 | 17.6 |
| Clein | 920 | 9.2 |
| Alvarez | 787 | 7.9 |
| Portela | 695 | 7.0 |
| Gonzalez | 418 | 4.2 |
| Rosello | 304 | 3.1 |
| Marin | 192 | 1.9 |
| Padierne | 44 | 0.4 |
| Total votes | 9,952 | |

April 20, 1993 Nonpartisan General Election, Dade County Commission District 11
| Candidate | Votes | % |
|---|---|---|
| Miguel Díaz de la Portilla | 5,035 | 51.4 |
| Joe Garcia | 4,769 | 48.6 |
| Total votes | 9,804 | |

1996 Nonpartisan General Election, Dade County Commission District 11
| Candidate | Votes | % |
|---|---|---|
| Miguel Díaz de la Portilla | Unopposed | – |

2000 Nonpartisan Primary, Miami-Dade County Mayor
| Candidate | Votes | % |
|---|---|---|
| Alex Penelas | 133,686 | 51.6 |
| Miguel Díaz de la Portilla | 54,088 | 20.9 |
| Jay Love | 51,836 | 20.0 |
| Al Woods | 4,497 | 1.7 |
| Dave Slater | 4,095 | 1.6 |
| Pamela Lynn Cheatham | 3,968 | 1.5 |
| Juan A. Montes | 2,846 | 1.1 |
| Nicholas ‘Nick’ Cappetta | 1,606 | 0.6 |
| Joseph Perea | 1,274 | 0.5 |
| Frank Cervoni | 1,008 | 0.4 |
| Total votes | 272,433 | |

2004 Nonpartisan Primary, Miami-Dade County Mayor
| Candidate | Votes | % |
|---|---|---|
| Carlos Álvarez | 79,902 | 27.6 |
| Jimmy Morales | 58,388 | 20.1 |
| Maurice Ferré | 51,384 | 17.7 |
| Miguel Díaz de la Portilla | 44,319 | 15.3 |
| Jose Cancela | 34,740 | 12.0 |
| Jay N. Love | 12,752 | 4.4 |
| Dave Slater | 5,155 | 1.8 |
| Deliverance Charles Blue | 3,367 | 1.2 |
| Total votes | 290,007 | |

=== Florida Senate, 2010–2016 ===
2010 Republican Primary, Florida Senate District 36
| Party | Candidate | Votes | % |
|---|---|---|---|
| Republican | Miguel Díaz de la Portilla | 12,970 | 52.3% |
| Republican | Julio Robaina | 10,752 | 43.3% |
| Republican | J. Nillo | 1,092 | 4.4% |
| Total votes | | 24,814 | |

2010 General Election, Florida Senate District 36
| Party | Candidate | Votes | % |
|---|---|---|---|
| Republican | Miguel Díaz de la Portilla | 58,138 | 99.9% |
| | write-ins | 37 | 0.1% |
| Total votes | | 58,175 | |

2012 General Election, Florida Senate District 40
| Party | Candidate | Votes | % |
|---|---|---|---|
| Republican | Miguel Díaz de la Portilla | Unopposed | – |

2014 General Election, Florida Senate District 40
| Party | Candidate | Votes | % |
|---|---|---|---|
| Republican | Miguel Díaz de la Portilla | Unopposed | – |

2016 General Election, Florida Senate District 37
| Party | Candidate | Votes | % |
|---|---|---|---|
| Democratic | José Javier Rodríguez | 87,794 | 48.9% |
| Republican | Alex Díaz de la Portilla | 81,938 | 45.6% |
| No Party Affiliation | Mercedes Christian | 9,979 | 5.6% |
| Total votes | | 179,711 | |

Florida Senate
| Preceded by Alex Díaz de la Portilla | Member of the Florida Senate from the 36th district 2010–2012 | Succeeded by Oscar Braynon |
| Preceded by René García | Member of the Florida Senate from the 40th district 2012–2016 | Succeeded by Frank Artiles |
