= Tom Fabricio =

American attorney and politician

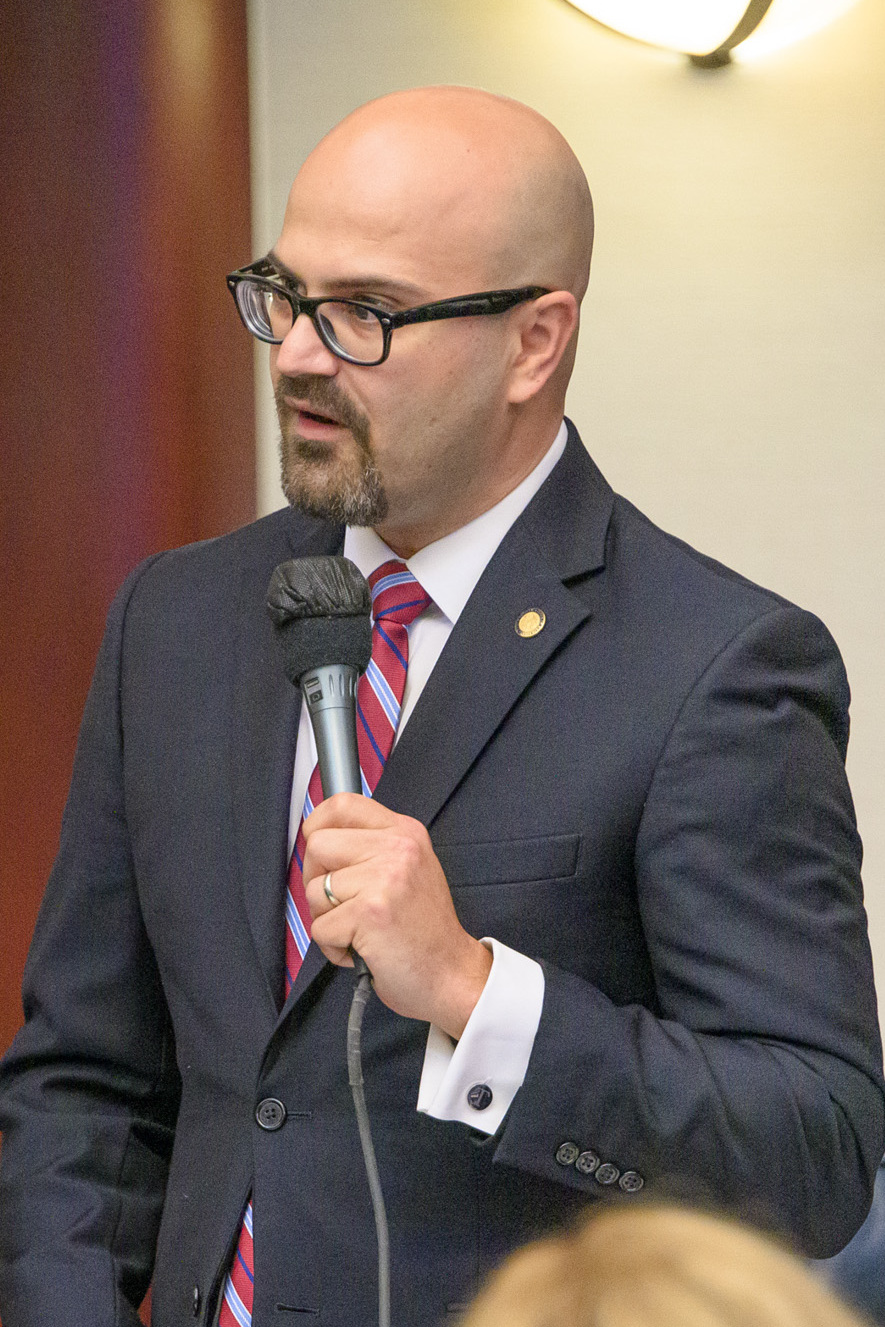

Member of the Florida House of Representatives
- Incumbent
- Assumed office November 3, 2020
- Preceded by: Cindy Polo
- Constituency: 103rd district (2020–2022); 110th district (2022–present)

Personal details
- Born: Miami, Florida, U.S.
- Party: Republican
- Spouse: Laura
- Children: 2
- Education: Marymount Manhattan College (BA); Nova Southeastern University (JD)

Tom Fabricio is an American attorney and politician serving as a member of the Florida House of Representatives from the 110th district which includes the Town of Miami Lakes, Palm Springs North, the Country Club of Miami and Hialeah. He assumed office on November 3, 2020. In 2020 after redistricting his legislative district was renumbered from district 103 to the current district 110.

== Early life and education ==
Fabricio was born in Miami. He earned a Bachelor of Arts degree in world literatures and political science from Marymount Manhattan College in 2005 and a Juris Doctor from the Shepard Broad College of Law at Nova Southeastern University in 2008.

== Career ==
In 2006, Fabricio was a law clerk for the Florida Third District Court of Appeal. From 2011 to 2017, he was an associate at Walton Lantaff Schroeder & Carson LLP. In 2017 and 2018, he was an attorney at Mintzer Sarowitz Zeris Ledva & Meyers LLP. From 2016 to 2018, Fabricio was a member of the Broward County Charter Review Commission. He was elected to the Florida House of Representatives in November 2020. He is a member of the House Commerce Committee. Mr. Fabricio is a litigator and the managing partner of The Fabricio Law Firm, P.A., as well as an owner of True Freedom Title, LLC.
