= Jim Brodie (politician) =

American politician (born 1947)

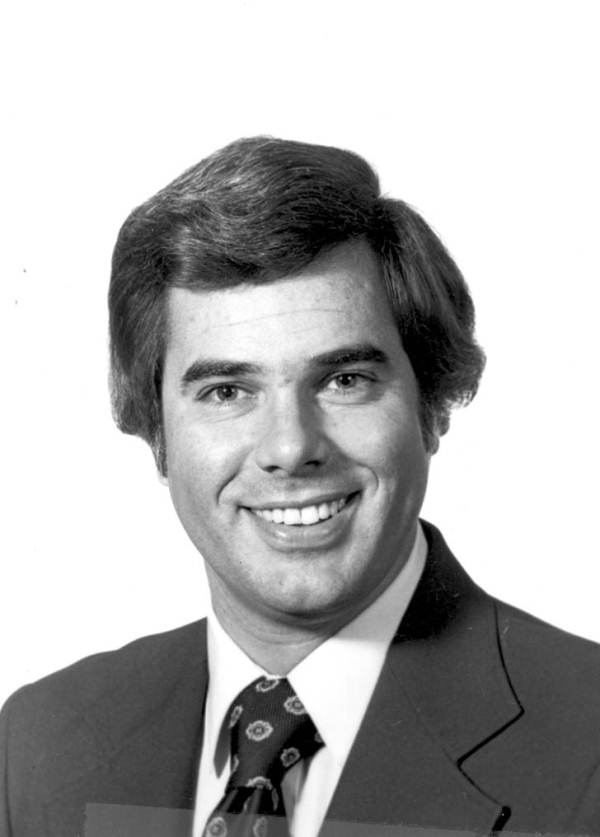
- Brodie in 1980

Member of the Florida House of Representatives from the 115th district
- In office 1980–1982
- Preceded by: Jim Eckhart
- Succeeded by: Tim Murphy

Personal details
- Born: March 11, 1947 (age 79)
- Party: Republican
- Education: Winona State University; Ball State University

Jim Brodie (born March 11, 1947) is an American politician. He served as a Republican member for the 115th district of the Florida House of Representatives.

== Life and career ==
Brodie attended Winona State University and Ball State University.

In 1980, Brodie was elected to represent the 115th district of the Florida House of Representatives, succeeding Jim Eckhart. He served until 1982, when he was succeeded by Tim Murphy.
