= List of Sigma Lambda Gamma chapters =

Sigma Lambda Gamma is a multicultural sorority. It was established in 1990 at the University of Iowa in Iowa City, Iowa.

The sorority's chapters are categorized into eleven regions, as follows:

- Central Region: Indiana, Kentucky, Michigan, Ohio, and Tennessee
- Mid-Atlantic Region: Delaware, District of Columbia, Maryland, New Jersey, Pennsylvania, Virginia, and West Virginia
- Mid-West Region: Illinois, Iowa, and Wisconsin
- North Central Region: Iowa, Minnesota, North Dakota, and South Dakota
- Northeast Region: Connecticut, Maine, Massachusetts, New Hampshire, New York, Rhode Island, and Vermont
- Northwest Region: Idaho, Montana, Oregon, and Washington
- Plains Region: Arkansas, Kansas, Missouri, Nebraska, and Oklahoma
- Southeast Region: Alabama, Florida, Georgia, Louisiana, Mississippi, North Carolina, and South Carolina
- Southern Region: Texas (excluding El Paso)
- Southwest Region: Arizona, Colorado, New Mexico, Utah, Wyoming, and El Paso, Texas
- Western Region: California and Nevada

== Collegiate chapters ==
In the following list, active chapters are indicated in bold, and inactive chapters are indicated in italics.

Chapter	Charter date and range	Institution	Location	Region	Status	Ref.
**Alpha**	April 9, 1990	University of Iowa	Iowa City, Iowa	North Central	Active	
**Beta**	1990	University of Michigan	Ann Arbor, Michigan	Central	Active	
**Gamma**	1992	Iowa State University	Ames, Iowa	North Central	Active	
**Delta**	1992	University of Illinois Urbana-Champaign	Urbana, Illinois	Mid-West	Active	
**Epsilon**	1994	Central Michigan University	Mount Pleasant, Michigan	Central	Active	
**Zeta**	199x ?–xxxx ?, xxxx ?	Illinois State University	Normal, Illinois	Mid-West	Active	
**Eta**	1993	Northern Illinois University	DeKalb, Illinois	Mid-West	Active	
**Theta**	1994	Western Illinois University	Macomb, Illinois	Mid-West	Active	
**Iota**	1994	Kansas State University	Manhattan, Kansas	Plains	Active	
**Kappa**	1994	University of Toledo	Toledo, Ohio	Central	Active	
Lambda	1994–xxxx ?	Saginaw Valley State University	University Center, Michigan	Central	Inactive	
**Mu**	1995	University of South Florida	Tampa, Florida	Southeast	Active	
**Nu**	1995	California State University, Dominguez Hills	Carson, California	Western	Active	
**Xi**	1995	University of Texas at Austin	Austin, Texas	Southern	Active	
**Omicron**	1995	Bowling Green State University	Bowling Green, Ohio	Central	Active	
**Pi**	1995	Southern Methodist University	Dallas, Texas	Southern	Active	
Rho	1995–xxxx ?	University of Chicago	Chicago, Illinois	Mid-West	Inactive	
**Sigma**	1996 ?	University of Illinois Chicago	Chicago, Illinois	Mid-West	Active	
Tau	1995–xxxx ?	Stony Brook University	Stony Brook, New York	Northeast	Inactive	
**Upsilon**	1996–xxxx ?, 2016	Eastern Michigan University	Ypsilanti, Michigan	Central	Active	
**Phi**	1997	Western Michigan University	Kalamazoo, Michigan	Central	Active	
**Chi**	1997	Purdue University	West Lafayette, Indiana	Central	Active	
**Psi**	1997	Indiana University	Bloomington, Indiana	Central	Active	
**Omega**					Memorial	(Note: The name Omega is reserved to recognize and pay respect to deceased sisters)
Alpha Alpha	1997–xxxx ?	Truman State University	Kirksville, Missouri	Plains	Inactive	
**Beta Alpha**	1997	Southern Illinois University	Carbondale, Illinois	Mid-West	Active	
**Gamma Alpha**	1997	DePaul University	Chicago, Illinois	Mid-West	Active	
**Delta Alpha**	1997	University of Kansas	Lawrence, Kansas	Plains	Active	
**Epsilon Alpha**	1998–xxxx ?, xxxx ?	Bradley University	Peoria, Illinois	Mid-West	Active	
Zeta Alpha	1998–xxxx ?	Johnson & Wales University	Providence, Rhode Island	Northeast	Inactive	
**Eta Alpha**	1998	Purdue University Northwest	Hammond, Indiana	Central	Active	
**Theta Alpha**	1998	Michigan State University	East Lansing, Michigan	Central	Active	
Iota Alpha	1998	Florida State University	Tallahassee, Florida	Southeast	Inactive	
**Kappa Alpha**	1998–xxxx ?, xxxx ?	Colorado State University	Fort Collins, Colorado	Southwest	Active	
**Lambda Alpha**	1998	Texas A&M University	College Station, Texas	Southern	Active	
Mu Alpha	1999–xxxx ?	Pace University	New York, New York	Northeast	Inactive	
**Nu Alpha**	1999	University of Southern California	Los Angeles, California	Western	Active	
**Xi Alpha**	1999	Texas State University	San Marcos, Texas	Southern	Active	
**Omicron Alpha**	1999	Grand Valley State University	Allendale, Michigan	Central	Active	
**Pi Alpha**	1999	Santa Clara University	Santa Clara, California	Western	Active	
Rho Alpha	1999–xxxx ?	University of Florida	Gainesville, Florida	Southeast	Inactive	
**Sigma Alpha**	2000	University of Minnesota	Minneapolis, Minnesota	North Central	Active	
**Tau Alpha**	2000	Northwestern University	Evanston, Illinois	Mid-West	Active	
**Upsilon Alpha**	2000	Elmhurst College	Elmhurst, Illinois	Mid-West	Active	
**Phi Alpha**	2000	Pennsylvania State University	State College, Pennsylvania	Mid-Atlantic	Active	
**Chi Alpha**	2000	University of Houston	Houston, Texas	Southern	Active	
**Psi Alpha**	2000	Rutgers University	New Brunswick, New Jersey	Mid-Atlantic	Active	
**Alpha Beta**	2000	Loyola Marymount University	Los Angeles, California	Western	Active	
**Beta Beta**	2000	University of Missouri	Columbia, Missouri	Plains	Active	
Gamma Beta	2000–20xx ?	Kean University	Union, New Jersey	Mid-Atlantic	Inactive	
**Delta Beta**	2000	University of Northern Colorado	Greeley, Colorado	Southwest	Active	
**Epsilon Beta**	2000	University of California, Irvine	Irvine, California	Western	Active	
**Zeta Beta**	2000	Sam Houston State University	Huntsville, Texas	Southern	Active	
Eta Beta	2000–20xx ?	Loyola University Chicago	Chicago, Illinois	Mid-West	Inactive	
**Theta Beta**	2000	Stephen F. Austin State University	Nacogdoches, Texas	Southern	Active	
**Iota Beta**	2000	University of Central Florida	Orlando, Florida	Southeast	Active	
Kappa Beta	2000–20xx ?	Colorado College	Colorado Springs, Colorado	Southwest	Inactive	
**Lambda Beta**	2000	California State University, Northridge	Los Angeles, California	Western	Active	
**Mu Beta**	2000	United States Military Academy	West Point, New York	Northeast	Active	
Nu Beta	2000–2016	University of Nebraska–Lincoln	Lincoln, Nebraska	Plains	Inactive	
**Xi Beta**	2001	University of Oklahoma	Norman, Oklahoma	Plains	Active	
**Omicron Beta**	2002	University of Texas at Arlington	Arlington, Texas	Southern	Active	
Pi Beta	2002–20xx ?	Georgia State University	Atlanta, Georgia	Southeast	Inactive	
**Rho Beta**	2002	University of North Texas	Denton, Texas	Southern	Active	
**Sigma Beta**	2002	University of Tampa	Tampa, Florida	Southeast	Active	
**Tau Beta**	2002	California State University, Long Beach	Long Beach, California	Western	Active	
**Upsilon Beta**	2002	University of Texas at El Paso	El Paso, Texas	Southwest	Active	
**Phi Beta**	2003	University of Central Oklahoma	Edmond, Oklahoma	Plains	Active	
**Chi Beta**	2003	University of Texas Rio Grande Valley	Edinburg, Texas	Southern	Active	
**Psi Beta**	2003	Florida A&M University	Tallahassee, Florida	Southeast	Active	
**Alpha Gamma**	2004	University of Miami	Miami, Florida	Southeast	Active	
**Beta Gamma**	2004	University of Arizona	Tucson, Arizona	Southwest	Active	
**Gamma Gamma**	2004	Northeastern Illinois University	Chicago, Illinois	Mid-West	Active	
**Delta Gamma**	2004	University of California, Los Angeles	Los Angeles, California	Western	Active	
**Epsilon Gamma**	2004	Occidental College	Los Angeles, California	Western	Active	
**Zeta Gamma**	2004	Ohio University	Athens, Ohio	Central	Active	
Eta Gamma	2004–20xx ?	University at Buffalo	Buffalo, New York	Northeast	Inactive	
**Theta Gamma**	2005	Binghamton University	Binghamton, New York	Northeast	Active	
**Iota Gamma**	2006	San Diego State University	San Diego, California	Western	Active	
**Kappa Gamma**	2006	University of Wisconsin–Madison	Madison, Wisconsin	Mid-West	Active	
**Lambda Gamma**	2006	University of Wyoming	Laramie, Wyoming	Southwest	Active	
**Mu Gamma**	2006	University of California, Davis	Davis, California	Western	Active	
**Nu Gamma**	2006	University of Colorado Boulder	Boulder, Colorado	Southwest	Active	
**Xi Gamma**	2007	California State University, Sacramento	Sacramento, California	Western	Active	
**Omicron Gamma**	2007	Marquette University	Milwaukee, Wisconsin	Mid-West	Active	
**Pi Gamma**	2007	Miami University	Oxford, Ohio	Central	Active	
**Rho Gamma**	2007	Texas Southern University	Houston, Texas	Southern	Active	
**Sigma Gamma**	2007	Towson University	Towson, Maryland	Mid-Atlantic	Active	
Tau Gamma	2007–20xx ?	University of Alabama	Tuscaloosa, Alabama	Southeast	Inactive	
**Upsilon Gamma**	2007	University of Washington	Seattle, Washington	Northwest	Active	
**Phi Gamma**	2008	Florida International University	Miami, Florida	Southeast	Active	
**Chi Gamma**	2008	University of Nebraska at Kearney	Kearney, Nebraska	Plains	Active	
**Psi Gamma**	2009	University of California, Santa Cruz	Santa Cruz, California	Western	Active	
**Alpha Delta**	2009	University of Houston–Downtown	Houston, Texas	Southern	Active	
**Beta Delta**	2009	Chicago State University	Chicago, Illinois	Mid-West	Active	
**Gamma Delta**	2009	Vanderbilt University	Nashville, Tennessee	Central	Active	
**Delta Delta**	2010	Texas Women's University	Denton, Texas	Southern	Active	
**Epsilon Delta**	2010	University of California, Santa Barbara	Santa Barbara, California	Western	Active	
**Zeta Delta**	2010	University of Idaho	Moscow, Idaho	Northwest	Active	
Eta Delta	2010–20xx ?	City College of New York	New York, New York	Northeast	Inactive	
**Theta Delta**	2010	Columbia University	New York, New York	Northeast	Active	
**Iota Delta**	2010	Millikin University	Decatur, Illinois	Mid-West	Active	
**Kappa Delta**	2010	University of Massachusetts Amherst	Amherst, Massachusetts	Northeast	Active	
**Lambda Delta**	2010	Houston Christian University	Houston, Texas	Southern	Active	
**Mu Delta**	2010	Eastern Washington University	Cheney, Washington	Northwest	Active	
Nu Delta	2010–20xx ?	Eastern Illinois University	Charleston, Illinois	Mid-West	Inactive	
**Xi Delta**	2010	Texas A&M University–Corpus Christi	Corpus Christi, Texas	Southern	Active	
**Omicron Delta**	2011	University of Denver	Denver, Colorado	Southwest	Active	
**Pi Delta**	2010	Arizona State University	Phoenix, Arizona	Southwest	Active	
**Rho Delta**	2011	State University of New York at New Paltz	New Paltz, New York	Northeast	Active	
Sigma Delta	2011–20xx ?	Rutgers University–Newark	Newark, New Jersey	Mid-Atlantic	Inactive	
**Tau Delta**	2012	Creighton University	Omaha, Nebraska	Plains	Active	
**Upsilon Delta**	2012	Denison University	Granville, Ohio	Central	Active	
**Phi Delta**	2012	Florida Gulf Coast University	Fort Myers, Florida	Southeast	Active	
**Chi Delta**	2012	Wayne State University	Detroit, Michigan	Central	Active	
Psi Delta	2012–20xx ?	South Carolina State University	Orangeburg, South Carolina	Southeast	Inactive	
**Alpha Epsilon**	2012	Washington State University	Pullman, Washington	Northwest	Active	
**Beta Epsilon**	2012	Dickinson College	Carlisle, Pennsylvania	Mid-Atlantic	Active	
**Gamma Epsilon**	2012	DePauw University	Greencastle, Indiana	Central	Active	
**Delta Epsilon**	2012	California State University, Los Angeles	Los Angeles, California	Western	Active	
**Epsilon Epsilon**	2012	Oklahoma State University–Stillwater	Stillwater, Oklahoma	Plains	Active	
**Zeta Epsilon**	2012	University of Wisconsin–Parkside	Somers, Wisconsin	Mid-West	Active	
**Eta Epsilon**	2012	Louisiana State University	Baton Rouge, Louisiana	Southeast	Active	
**Theta Epsilon**	2012	Prairie View A&M University	Prairie View, Texas	Southern	Active	
**Iota Epsilon**	2012	University of Nebraska Omaha	Omaha, Nebraska	Plains	Active	
**Kappa Epsilon**	2012	Lewis University	Romeoville, Illinois	Mid-West	Active	
**Lambda Epsilon**	2013	University of Texas at Dallas	Richardson, Texas	Southern	Active	
Mu Epsilon	2013–20xx ?	Florida Atlantic University	Boca Raton, Florida	Southeast	Inactive	
**Nu Epsilon**	2013	West Chester University	West Chester, Pennsylvania	Southeast	Active	
**Xi Epsilon**	2013	University of North Florida	Jacksonville, Florida	Southeast	Active	
**Omicron Epsilon**	2013	University of Dubuque	Dubuque, Iowa	North Central	Active	
**Pi Epsilon**	2013	Ohio State University	Columbus, Ohio	Central	Active	
**Rho Epsilon**	2014	Texas Tech University	Lubbock, Texas	Southern	Active	
**Sigma Epsilon**	2014	Saint Leo University	St. Leo, Florida	Southeast	Active	
**Tau Epsilon**	2014	University of Louisiana at Lafayette	Lafayette, Louisiana	Southeast	Active	
**Upsilon Epsilon**	2015	California State Polytechnic University, Pomona	Pomona, California	Western	Active	
**Phi Epsilon**	2015	Texas A&M International University	Laredo, Texas	Southern	Active	
**Chi Epsilon**	2016	Ferris State University	Big Rapids, Michigan	Central	Active	
**Psi Epsilon**	2016	University of Alabama at Birmingham	Birmingham, Alabama	Southeast	Active	
**Alpha Zeta**	2016	Boise State University	Boise, Idaho	Northwest	Active	
**Beta Zeta**	2016	Georgia Southern University	Statesboro, Georgia	Southeast	Active	
**Gamma Zeta**	2016	San Francisco State University	San Francisco, California	Western	Active	
**Delta Zeta**	2017	Valparaiso University	Valparaiso, Indiana	Central	Active	
**Epsilon Zeta**	2017	The College of New Jersey	Ewing Township, New Jersey	Mid-Atlantic	Active	
**Zeta Zeta**	2017	University of Missouri–Kansas City	Kansas City, Missouri	Plains	Active	
**Eta Zeta**	2017	Simpson College	Indianola, Iowa	North Central	Active	
**Theta Zeta**	2017	Valdosta State University	Valdosta, Georgia	Southeast	Active	
**Iota Zeta**	2017	California State University, San Bernardino	San Bernardino, California	Western	Active	
**Kappa Zeta**	2017	University of Wisconsin–Milwaukee	Milwaukee, Wisconsin	Mid-West	Active	
**Lambda Zeta**	2017	University of North Texas at Dallas	Dallas, Texas	Southern	Active	
**Mu Zeta**	2017	University of Texas at San Antonio	San Antonio, Texas	Southern	Active	
**Nu Zeta**	2017	University of Maryland, College Park	College Park, Maryland	Mid-Atlantic	Active	
**Xi Zeta**	2019	Nova Southeastern University	Fort Lauderdale, Florida	Southeast	Active	
**Omicron Zeta**	2020	University of Kentucky	Lexington, Kentucky	Central	Active	
**Pi Zeta**	2019	Franklin & Marshall College	Lancaster, Pennsylvania	Mid-Atlantic	Active	
**Rho Zeta**	2020	Clemson University	Clemson, South Carolina	Southeast	Active	
**Sigma Zeta**	2022	Coe College	Cedar Rapids, Iowa	North Central	Active	
**Tau Zeta**	2022	Washburn University	Topeka, Kansas	Plains	Active	
**Upsilon Zeta**	2023	Metropolitan State University of Denver	Denver, Colorado	Southwest	Active	
**Phi Zeta**	2023	Missouri State University	Springfield, Missouri	Plains	Active	
**Chi Zeta**	2023	Case Western Reserve University	Cleveland, Ohio	Central	Active	
**Psi Zeta**	2025	Idaho State University	Pocatello, Idaho	Northwest	Active	
**Alpha Eta**	2025	Morgan State University	Baltimore, Maryland	Mid-Atlantic	Active	
**Beta Eta**	2025	Bowie State University	Bowie, Maryland	Mid-Atlantic	Active	
**Kutztown University Associate**		Kutztown University	Kutztown, Pennsylvania	Mid-Atlantic	Active	
**University of Arkansas at Little Rock Associate**		University of Arkansas at Little Rock	Little Rock, Arkansas	Plains	Active	
**SUNY Potsdam Associate**		State University of New York at Potsdam	Potsdam, New York	Northeast	Active	
**Robert Morris University Associate**		Robert Morris University	Moon Township, Pennsylvania	Mid-Atlantic	Active	

== Alumnae associations ==
In the following list, active chapters are indicated in bold and inactive chapters are indicated in italics.

Chapter	Location	Status	Ref.
Alabama	Alabama	Inactive	
**Central Iowa**	Iowa	Active	
Central Florida	Orlando, Florida	Inactive	
**Chicago Metropolitan**	Chicago, Illinois	Active	
**Dallas–Fort Worth**	Dallas and Fort Worth, Texas	Active	
**District of Columbia Metro Area**	Washington, D.C.	Active	
**Eastern Iowa/Quad Cities**	Iowa	Active	
**El Paso**	El Paso, Texas	Active	
**Georgia**	Atlanta, Savannah, and Valdosta, Georgia	Active	
**Greater Area of Milwaukee-Madison**	Milwaukee and Madison, Wisconsin	Active	
**Greater Austin**	Austin, Texas	Active	
**Houston Metro**	Houston, Texas	Active	
Indianapolis	Indianapolis, Indiana	Inactive	
**Inland Empire**	California	Active	
**Kansas City Metropolitan**	Kansas City, Missouri	Active	
**Maryland**	Baltimore, Maryland	Active	
Metropolitan Atlanta	Atlanta, Georgia	Inactive	
**Michigan**	Michigan	Active	
**Nebraska**	Nebraska	Active	
New England		Inactive	
**New Jersey**	New Jersey	Active	
**New York City**	New York City, New York	Active	
**North Florida**	Jacksonville, Florida	Active	
**Northeast Ohio**	Cleveland, Ohio	Active	
**Northern California**	California	Active	
**Oklahoma**	Oklahoma	Active	
**Philadelphia Metro**	Philadelphia, Pennsylvania	Active	
Rio Grande Valley		Inactive	
**San Antonio Metropolitan**	San Antonio, Texas	Active	
**San Diego**	San Diego, California	Active	
**South Florida**	Broward County; Miami-Dade County; and Palm Beach County, Florida	Active	
**Southeast Louisiana**	Louisiana	Active	
**Southern Arizona**	Arizona	Active	
**Southern California**	California	Active	
**Southwest Florida**	Cape Coral, Charlotte County, Collier County, Fort Myers, Lee County, and Naples, Florida	Active	
Suburbs of Chicago	Chicago, Illinois	Inactive	
Tallahassee	Tallahassee, Florida	Active	
**Tampa Bay**	Tampa, Florida	Active	
Texas Gulf Cost	Texas	Inactive	
Twin Cities	Minneapolis and Saint Paul, Minnesota	Inactive	
**West Michigan**	Michigan	Active	
