= Cindy Polo =

American politician from Florida

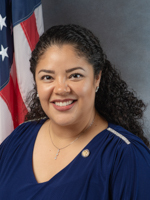

Member of the Florida House of Representatives from the 103rd district
- In office November 6, 2018 – November 3, 2020
- Preceded by: Manny Díaz Jr.
- Succeeded by: Tom Fabricio

Personal details
- Born: November 29, 1977 (age 48) Providence, Rhode Island
- Party: Democratic
- Education: Florida International University (B.S., M.B.A.)

Cindy Sofia Polo (born November 29, 1977) is a Democratic politician from Florida. She served one term in the Florida House of Representatives, representing the 103rd district in northwestern Miami-Dade and southwestern Broward Counties from 2018 to 2020.

== Early life ==
Cindy Sofia Polo was born in Providence, Rhode Island, on November 29, 1977, to Ramon and Carmen Polo who left their homeland of Colombia in search of a better future for their young family.

Ramon worked for many years as a unionized foreman for Entenmann's, Carmen as a seamstress. The youngest of three children, Polo was the first to be born stateside. At the age of two, their family moved from Providence to Miami Lakes, Florida.

== Career ==
Her professional career includes time with the Miami Heat and the Miami-Dade Expressway Authority as a Communications Director. For several years, Polo took a professional hiatus as she has dedicated her time and energy to raising her son, CJ. In February 2018, moved by the tragedy of the Parkland shooting, Polo filed to run for office as a Democratic candidate.

Although a clear underdog in a Republican district since 1998, she won the election on November 6, 2018. She secured 53% of the vote while her closest rival Frank Mingo, a Republican candidate secured 47%. In August 2019, Republican Tom Fabricio announced his intention to run against Polo for the seat.

Polo's push to have Florida legislators vote to hold a special session discussing gun laws did not receive the appropriate amount to move forward.

Polo lost reelection in 2020 to Republican Tom Fabricio, who won 54–46%.

== Personal life ==
Polo is a member of the multicultural sorority Sigma Lambda Gamma.

== Education ==
Polo graduated from Hialeah-Miami Lakes Senior High School in 1995. In 2004, she earned a Bachelor of Science from Florida International University in Mass Communication and subsequently received her master's degree in Business Administration from the same institution.
