= José Javier Rodríguez (Florida politician) =

American attorney & politician (born 1978)

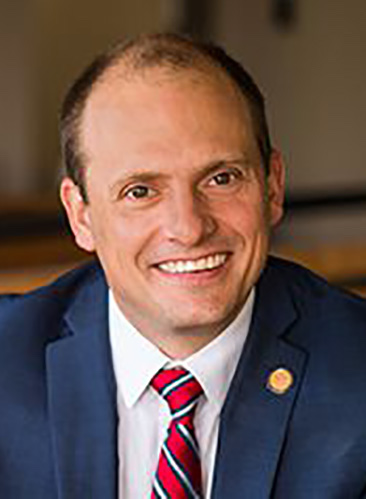

Assistant Secretary of Labor for Employment and Training
- In office April 2024 – January 20, 2025
- President: Joe Biden
- Preceded by: Brent Parton (acting)
- Succeeded by: Vacant

Member of the Florida Senate from the 37th district
- In office November 8, 2016 – November 3, 2020
- Preceded by: Redistricted
- Succeeded by: Ileana Garcia

Member of the Florida House of Representatives from the 112th district
- In office November 6, 2012 – November 8, 2016
- Preceded by: Redistricted
- Succeeded by: Nicholas Duran

Personal details
- Born: August 8, 1978 (age 48) High Point, North Carolina, U.S.
- Party: Democratic
- Spouse: Sonia Succar Ferré
- Education: Brown University (BA); Harvard University (JD)
- Website: Campaign website

José Javier Rodríguez (born August 8, 1978) is an American politician and attorney who served the as assistant secretary of labor for employment and training under President Joe Biden from 2024 to 2025. A member of the Democratic Party, he served as a member of the Florida Senate from 2016 to 2020 and as a member of the Florida House of Representatives from 2012 to 2016.

== Early life and education ==
Jose Javier Rodríguez grew up in Miami, Florida. His father fled Cuba when he was fifteen years old during Operation Pedro Pan, and his mother's family has midwestern roots.

Rodríguez was an Eagle Scout and graduated from Miami Palmetto Senior High School. He attended Brown University, receiving a degree in international relations in 2000. He served in the U.S. Peace Corps from 2000 to 2003. Rodríguez earned his Juris Doctor from Harvard Law School in 2006.

== Career ==
=== Florida House of Representatives ===
==== 2012 Florida House of Representatives ====
In 2012, Rodríguez defeated a veteran lawmaker, which stunned some observers. He faced Alex Dominguez in the Democratic primary, which the Miami Herald called a "low-key" race compared to the acidic Republican primary. Rodríguez won the primary with 58% of the vote. In the general election, Rodríguez faced former State Senator Alex Díaz de la Portilla. Rodríguez campaigned on supporting public education, encouraging economic growth, and the fresh perspective that he would bring to the legislature, noting, "[m]y opponent practically invented the business model of pandering to voters in Miami and then selling us out in Tallahassee." Rodríguez defeated Díaz de la Portilla, receiving 54% of the vote.

Rodríguez was known as a thoughtful legislator. He served on the Select Committee on Patient Protection and Affordable Care Act; the Finance & Tax Subcommittee; Select Committee on Redistricting; and the Health Quality Subcommittee, among others.

==== 2014 Florida House of Representatives ====
In 2014, Rodríguez faced another competitive race for the Florida House of Representatives. He enjoyed bipartisan support for this race. He won this race with 51% of the vote against Daniel Diaz Leva.

Rodríguez served on the Finance & Tax Committee, Judiciary Committee, Justice Appropriations Subcommittee, and Agriculture & Natural Resources Appropriations Subcommittee.

=== 2016 Florida Senate ===
In 2016, court-ordered redistricting created a new 37th district which included all of Rodríguez's house district. Rodríguez decided to run for the new seat against incumbent state senator Miguel Díaz de la Portilla, the brother of Alex. Rodríguez defeated Díaz de la Portilla in the general election, 49% to 46%. The ballot also included an independent candidate, Mercedes Christian, who raised less than $2000 and received more than 9,900 votes.

Rodriguez served on the Judiciary Committee; Appropriations Subcommittee on Agriculture, Environment, and General Government; Ethics and Elections Committee; and Rules Committee.

=== 2020 Florida Senate race ===
In 2020, Rodríguez lost his re-election bid to Republican Ileana Garcia by a narrow margin of 32 votes. The ballot also included an independent candidate with the same surname, Alex Rodríguez, who was previously registered as Republican. Alex Rodríguez's campaign was funded with dark money linked to Republican strategists. Alex Rodríguez received more than 6,000 votes.

Former state Senator Frank Artiles, a Republican, took credit for engineering Alex Rodríguez's run and Garcia's subsequent victory, according to a report by The Miami Herald. Artiles was arrested after it became apparent that he had paid $44,708.03 to the sham candidate.

=== Biden administration ===
On July 2, 2021, President Joe Biden nominated Rodriguez to serve as the assistant secretary for employment & training in the United States Department of Labor. Hearings were held on the nomination in the Senate HELP Committee on October 7, 2021. The committee deadlocked on the nomination on October 26, 2021. Rodriguez's initial nomination expired at the end of the year and was returned to President Biden on January 3, 2022. President Biden re-sent his nomination to the Senate the following day. On January 13, 2022, the committee reported his nomination favorably to the Senate floor. His nomination again expired and was re-sent on January 23, 2023. On November 28, 2023, the Senate failed to invoke cloture on his nomination by a 44–51 vote. His nomination was confirmed by the Senate on March 21, 2024 by a 50–48 vote.

=== Florida attorney general campaign ===
On June 2, 2025, Rodriguez launched his campaign for Florida attorney general, saying he wants to be the "people's lawyer." He told political correspondents that he is running on an anti-corruption platform, with a focus on consumer protection and bringing independence back to the office of the Florida attorney general.

James Uthmeier, who was appointed to serve as attorney general in 2025, is also running. Uthmeier has denied wrongdoing in the Hope Florida scandal.

== Personal life ==
Rodríguez married Sonia Succar Ferré, the granddaughter of former Miami mayor Maurice Ferré, in 2014. Rodriguez and Ferré have two sons.
