= Sigma Lambda Gamma =

Multicultural-based collegiate sorority in the United States

- ΣΛΓ
- Founded: April 9, 1990; 36 years ago University of Iowa
- Type: Social
- Affiliation: Independent
- Former affiliation: NALFO
- Status: Active
- Scope: National
- Motto: "Culture is Pride, Pride is Success"
- Colors: Shocking Pink; Majestic Purple
- Symbol: Purple panther
- Flower: Pink rose
- Jewel: Purple amethyst
- Publication: La Mensajera
- Chapters: 151 undergraduate, 7 associate, 32 alumnae associations
- Nicknames: Gammas, SLG
- Headquarters: PO Box 3267; Iowa City, Iowa 52244; United States
- Website: sigmalambdagamma.org

Sigma Lambda Gamma (ΣΛΓ), also known as Gammas or SLG, is a multicultural sorority in the United States with predominantly Latina membership. It was founded in 1990, at the University of Iowa in Iowa City, Iowa. It now comprises 235 entities, and membership is open to both women and nonbinary students and graduates.

== History ==
=== Establishment ===
In the fall of 1989, a group of women met to form an organization that would "empower women from every culture". By April 9, 1990, the University of Iowa Panhellenic Council officially recognized the organization as a sorority, which Sigma Lambda Gamma celebrates as its founding date. The five women who were instrumental in establishing the organization–Gloria Cuevas, Julieta Maria Miller, Maria Ester Pineda, Danell Marie Riojas, and Guadalupe Temiquel–are collectively referred to as the Five Founding Mothers (initially known as the "Lambda Ladies").

Five Founding Mothers

The group received support in their establishment by fellow fraternity Sigma Lambda Beta which was established at the University of Iowa four years prior. A national headquarters was initially housed out of the Iowa Memorial Student Union moving to 900 West Penn Street in North Liberty, Iowa. They later moved to their current address at 1295 Jordan Street, Suite 3 in North Liberty, Iowa. Along with housing national records and staff, it was also home to the sorority's national biannual publication, La Mensajera. The Omega chapter was later established to recognize and pay respect to deceased sisters.

=== F.I.R.M. Family ===
In the early 1990s, following the establishment of Sigma Lambda Gamma, members of the sorority, along with Sigma Lambda Beta, Phi Beta Sigma, and Zeta Phi Beta, formed the First Inter-Racially Mixed (F.I.R.M) Family network. This network was created to embody a shared commitment to unity and mutual support across these diverse Greek organizations. Although Sigma Lambda Beta and Sigma Lambda Gamma share a historical connection and similarities in their founding processes, they are not constitutionally bound organizations.

=== Withdrawal from NALFO ===
As the sorority grew, Sigma Lambda Gamma's membership became more multicultural. In acknowledging this, the organization, which was a part of the National Association of Latino Fraternal Organizations (NALFO) from January 2001 to May 2010, left due to a desire for autonomy and due to its increasing multicultural membership.

=== 21st century expansion ===
The sorority celebrated their 100th and 101st chapters simultaneously with the addition of the Theta Delta chapter at Columbia University and the Iota Delta chapter at Millikin University in 2010, having expanded to more than 100 chapters in twenty years.

While chapters have always organized local programming on their respective campuses, Sigma Lambda Gamma later created the Education Foundation. The Young Women's Leadership program was designed to promote confidence and leadership skills for middle-school aged girls. An emotional intelligence education program was also started up. Scholarships were later added to support members in higher education. In 2012, the Panther Dash For Education was developed to generate funds that will support scholastic achievement and leadership training. A virtual race, sisters are encouraged to participate in any run/walk event of their choice and then later upload it to media sites.

== Philanthropy and social awareness ==
=== Philanthropy ===
Sigma Lambda Gamma's first philanthropy is to raise awareness about breast cancer. Although Sigma Lambda Gamma's website once stated support for the Susan G. Komen for the Cure and Y-ME National Breast Cancer Organization, they currently do not affiliate with either one. In 2013, one member shaved her head to raise money for cancer research, eventually topping $2,650, while the Theta Gamma chapter organized a fashion show and raised over $800 in 2014. The following year, the Xi Beta chapter organized a ball with the men of Phi Beta Sigma to raise funds for breast cancer and the March of Dimes. In 2014, the sorority raised over $14,000 collectively to donate to twenty different breast cancer research organizations.

The sorority also supports the Federal TRiO Programs, which are programs in the United States designed to identify and provide services for individuals from disadvantaged backgrounds. Similar to breast cancer awareness, chapters have organized local fundraisers to donate to the programs: the Beta Epsilon chapter hosted a bake sale in 2017, while the Tau Delta chapter organized a volleyball tournament in 2018.

=== Social issues and awareness ===
The sorority has partnered with different organizations to raise awareness about different societal issues.

In the 2014 Voto Latino's RepUrLetters Challenge, in which historically Latino Greek-lettered organizations competed to register voters on their campuses and in their communities, Sigma Lambda Gamma's voter registration efforts accounted for 36% of the total number of voters registered, with the highest number of voters registered. In 2014, the sorority launched their "Gammas Go Red" campaign in partnership with the American Heart Association on social media in an effort to raise awareness about heart disease in women. Additionally, they launched a partnership with the American Red Cross after attending the 2017 Diversity in Aquatics Symposium, focusing on educating about the importance of water safety. In 2020, they publicly voiced their support for the Black Lives Matter movement after the murder of Ahmaud Arbery, an unarmed 25-year-old African-American man, who was pursued and fatally shot while jogging near Brunswick in Glynn County, Georgia.

Additionally, chapters also organize local philanthropic projects and have hosted events about other social issues. The Chi Gamma chapter raised funds for the 2013 Oklahoma tornado disaster the same year it occurred. The Beta Gamma chapter adopted a highway in 2015. The Gamma chapter held a fundraiser for animal shelters in 2015. The Kappa Gamma chapter hosted a panel about LGBTQ identities in 2017. The Epsilon Zeta chapter raised awareness about male sexual assault with the men of Alpha Phi Alpha in 2019.

Associate chapters are encouraged to foster and establish local philanthropies early on. Notably, the Morgan State University Associate chapter has advocated for social justice and advocating for the environment since 2018. The Bowie State University Associate chapter has marched in Washington D.C. to hold Congress accountable.

== Education Foundation ==
These programs are under the Sigma Lambda Gamma Education Foundation, an umbrella philanthropic entity.

=== Young Women's Leadership Program ===
An eight-week program, the Young Women's Leadership Program is a series of exercises and activities for school-age girls. Members serve as facilitators of these activities, in addition to mentors. The Sigma Lambda Gamma Education Foundation assists programs across the country to provide materials, transportation, food, and other program costs for facilitators and participants.

=== Panther Dash for Education ===
To encourage members to mobilize their bodies as well as give back to the community, Sigma Lambda Gamma created the Panther Dash for Education in 2012. Members can participate in any 5K race of their choice and purchase Sigma Lambda Gamma packages, such as a bib, T-shirt, or water bottle with the sorority's letters and logo, to raise funds.

=== Emotional Intelligence ===
This Emotional Intelligence program focuses on members addressing the needs of the sisterhood in the most timely and effective way. All members complete the EI Profile: An Emotional Intelligence Self-Assessment. Based on the results of this self-assessment, members will have the chance during the academic year to learn more about the nineteen different skills of emotional intelligence.

=== Scholarships ===
Annual scholarships are given to members who have been initiated into the organization and are in good standing, as defined by Sigma Lambda Gamma policy, who are enrolled as degree-seeking students during the academic year. Sisters who are studying abroad are not eligible. The two offered are the Mary L. Peterson Scholarship and the Esther Materon-Arum Scholarship, named after the two women who helped the Founding Mothers in creating the sorority.

== Chapters ==
Chapters are categorized into eleven regions. Each region has a Regional Director, who serves as the liaison between university personnel and the National Board of Directors through annual entity visits. The Omega chapter is established to recognize and pay respect to deceased sisters.

The regions are as follows:

- Northeast Region: New York, Vermont, Maine, Rhode Island, New Hampshire, Massachusetts, Connecticut
- Southeast Region: Louisiana, Mississippi, Alabama, Florida, Georgia, North Carolina, South Carolina
- Central Region: Indiana, Michigan, Ohio, Kentucky, Tennessee
- Midwest Region: Illinois, Wisconsin
- North Central Region: Minnesota, Iowa, North Dakota, South Dakota
- Southern Region: Texas (excluding El Paso)
- Northwest Region: Washington, Oregon, Idaho, Montana
- Western Region: California, Nevada
- Southwest Region: Wyoming, Colorado, Arizona, New Mexico, Utah & El Paso, Texas
- Plains Region: Nebraska, Kansas, Oklahoma, Missouri, Arkansas
- Mid-Atlantic Region: New Jersey, Pennsylvania, Maryland, Delaware, District of Columbia, West Virginia, Virginia

== Membership ==
A criterion for membership into Sigma Lambda Gamma is that a woman or non-binary individual must have exceptional morals and ethics with a demonstrated commitment to academic excellence, and is pursuing or has completed courses leading to a degree in an accredited college or university. Memberships are categorized as undergrad or alumnae. According to Sigma Lambda Gamma's national constitution, they believe that a multicultural experience during the college years enhances each member's ability to function in a pluralistic society. They do not discriminate based on age, race, national origin, religious preference, sexual orientation, or disability. They encourage their members to celebrate the diverse backgrounds of all the members of the sorority, and currently claim to have over 110 nationalities. Sigma Lambda Gamma does not condone hazing and requires all members to respect the dignity of all people, and therefore, shall not physically, mentally, psychologically, or sexually abuse or haze any human being. Memberships are categorized as undergraduate or alumnae.

== Notable members ==
- Vannessa Vasquez (Chi Alpha) – actress
- Cindy Polo (Iota Alpha) – Florida State House Representative

== See also ==
- Cultural interest fraternities and sororities
- List of social sororities and women's fraternities
- List of Sigma Lambda Gamma chapters
