= Alex Díaz de la Portilla =

American politician (born 1964)

Álex Díaz de la Portilla
- Official portrait, 2020

Member of the Miami City Commission from the 1st district
- In office January 7, 2020 – September 15, 2023
- Preceded by: Willy Gort
- Succeeded by: Miguel Ángel Gabela

Majority Leader of the Florida Senate
- In office November 4, 2008 – November 2, 2010
- Preceded by: Daniel Webster
- Succeeded by: Andy Gardiner

President Pro Tempore of the Florida Senate
- In office 2002–2004

Member of the Florida Senate
- In office January 25, 2000 – November 2, 2010
- Preceded by: Alberto Gutman
- Succeeded by: Miguel Díaz de la Portilla
- Constituency: 34th district (2000–2002); 36th district (2002–2010)

Member of the Florida House of Representatives from the 115th district
- In office November 8, 1994 – January 25, 2000
- Preceded by: Carlos Manrique
- Succeeded by: Renier Díaz de la Portilla

Personal details
- Born: Alejandro Díaz de la Portilla; August 25, 1964 (age 62) Miami, Florida, U.S.
- Party: Republican
- Spouse: Claudia Davant (divorced)
- Relatives: Miguel Díaz de la Portilla (brother); Renier Díaz de la Portilla (brother)

Alejandro Díaz de la Portilla (born August 25, 1964) is an American political consultant and former politician from Florida. A Republican, Díaz de la Portilla was a City of Miami commissioner for District 1 and a member of the Florida Senate from 2000 to 2010, representing parts of Miami-Dade County. He also served in the Florida House of Representatives from 1994 until his election to the Senate. Former Miami Commissioner Álex Díaz de la Portilla is no longer facing charges following an investigation into alleged bribery and money laundering.

== Early life and family ==
Díaz de la Portilla was born in the Little Havana community of Miami. He was previously married to Claudia Davant.

Díaz is one of the four children of Cuban exiles Miguel Ángel Díaz Pardo and Fabiola Pura de la Portilla García. Díaz de la Portilla's progenitors include several men (including his great-grandfather) who had served in the Cuban government (including in the Senate and House of the former Congress of Cuba and as the Minister of Justice). His paternal great-grandfather served in the Cuban Senate; two of his sons served simultaneously in the Cuban House of Representatives. His maternal great-grandfather served as the Cuban Minister of Justice..

Díaz de la Portilla's two brothers have also held public office. Miguel Díaz de la Portilla served as a member of the Miami-Dade County Commission from 1993 to 2000 and succeeded Alex in the Florida Senate, serving from 2010 to 2016. Renier Díaz de la Portilla served two terms on the Miami-Dade County School Board (1996–1998 and 2006–2012). He also succeeded Alex in the House of Representatives, serving one term from 2000 to 2002.

== State legislature (1995–2010) ==
Florida Senate official portrait photograph, circa 2000

Díaz de la Portilla served in the Florida House of Representatives (1995–2000) and the Florida Senate (2000–2010).

Díaz de la Portilla's career in politics began in 1994, when he was elected to the Florida House of Representatives, District 115. Díaz de la Portilla served in the Florida House until 2000, when he was elected to the Florida Senate in a special election. He was reelected to the Senate three times. He served as president pro tempore from 2002 to 2004.

Díaz de la Portilla ran unsuccessfully to return to the Florida House of Representatives in 2012, for the Florida Senate in 2017. He also ran for the Miami-Dade County Commission in 2018.

== Miami City Commission (2019–2023) ==
In 2019, Díaz de la Portilla won a run-off election to the district 1 seat on the Miami City Commission (city council).

=== Arrest and suspension from office by Governor DeSantis ===
In September 2023, Díaz de la Portilla was arrested on charges of money laundering, bribery, criminal conspiracy, and illegal compensation for official acts. The arrest affidavit cited a combined 14 charges against Díaz de la Portilla and William “Bill” Riley Jr., an attorney and lobbyist. Díaz de la Portilla pleaded not guilty.

Díaz de la Portilla left office on September 15, 2023, after Governor Ron DeSantis suspended him from serving. The commission voted to leave the seat vacant until the November election. Díaz de la Portilla remained a candidate for another term in his seat. On November 21, 2023, Díaz de la Portilla was defeated by Miguel Angel Gabela in the election for Miami Commissioner District 1.

== 2025 mayoral campaign ==
Díaz de La Portilla was an unsuccessful candidate in the 2025 Miami mayoral election, and was regarded to be one of the six leading candidates in the thirteen-candidate field.

== Electoral history ==
=== Florida House of Representatives, 1990-1998 ===
1990 Republican Primary, Florida House District 114
Party	Candidate	Votes	%
Republican	Bruce Hoffman	2,270	52.9%
Republican	Thomas "Tom" Borell	1,020	23.8%
Republican	Alex Díaz de la Portilla	1,000	23.3%
Total votes		4,290	

1992 Republican Primary, Florida House District 115
Party	Candidate	Votes	%
Republican	Alex Díaz de la Portilla	1,953	36.4%
Republican	Carlos Manrique	1,250	23.3%
Republican	Manuel Casas	671	12.5%
Republican	Hugo D. Menendez	554	10.3%
Republican	Luis Rodriguez	523	9.8%
Republican	Raul Perez Sanz	410	7.6%
Total votes		5,361	

1992 Republican Primary Runoff, Florida House District 115
Party	Candidate	Votes	%
Republican	Carlos Manrique	1,612	53.8%
Republican	Alex Díaz de la Portilla	1,386	46.2%
Total votes		2,998	

1994 Republican Primary, Florida House District 115
Party	Candidate	Votes	%
Republican	Alex Díaz de la Portilla	6,787	70.7%
Republican	Carlos Manrique	2,809	29.3%
Total votes		9,596	

1994 General Election, Florida House District 115
Party	Candidate	Votes	%
Republican	Alex Díaz de la Portilla	Unopposed	–

1996 Republican Primary, Florida House District 115
Party	Candidate	Votes	%
Republican	Alex Díaz de la Portilla	8,968	87.8%
Republican	Fred A. Naaman	1,249	12.2%
Total votes		10,217	

1996 General Election, Florida House District 115
Party	Candidate	Votes	%
Republican	Alex Díaz de la Portilla	Unopposed	–

1998 Republican Primary, Florida House District 115
Party	Candidate	Votes	%
Republican	Alex Díaz de la Portilla	2,747	57.7%
Republican	Bernie Navarro	2,016	42.3%
Total votes		4,763	

1998 General Election, Florida House District 115
Party	Candidate	Votes	%
Republican	Alex Díaz de la Portilla	Unopposed	–

=== Florida Senate, 1999-2006 ===
December 14, 1999 Special Republican Primary, Florida Senate District 34
Party	Candidate	Votes	%
Republican	Alex Díaz de la Portilla	6,545	57.7%
Republican	Carlos L. Valdes	3,780	33.3%
Republican	Charles Rousseau	596	5.3%
Republican	Arthur Arnau	429	3.8%
Total votes		11,350	

January 25, 2000 Special General Election, Florida Senate District 34
Party	Candidate	Votes	%
Republican	Alex Díaz de la Portilla	Unopposed	–

2000 General Election, Florida Senate District 34
Party	Candidate	Votes	%
Republican	Alex Díaz de la Portilla	Unopposed	–

2002 Republican Primary, Florida Senate District 36
Party	Candidate	Votes	%
Republican	Alex Díaz de la Portilla	15,439	49.2%
Republican	Carlos Lacasa	13,186	42.0%
Republican	Mike Gorrie	2,764	8.8%
Total votes		31,389	

2002 General Election, Florida Senate District 36
Party	Candidate	Votes	%
Republican	Alex Díaz de la Portilla	66,945	100.0%
	write-ins	6	0.0%
Total votes		66,951	

2006 General Election, Florida Senate District 36
Party	Candidate	Votes	%
Republican	Alex Díaz de la Portilla	50,879	99.9%
	write-ins	30	0.1%
Total votes		50,909	

=== Post-Senate electoral career ===
2012 Republican Primary, Florida House District 112
Party	Candidate	Votes	%
Republican	Alex Díaz de la Portilla	4,396	58.8%
Republican	Gustavo Barreiro	3,075	41.2%
Total votes		7,471	

2012 General Election, Florida House District 112
Party	Candidate	Votes	%
Democratic	José Javier Rodríguez	28,053	53.7%
Republican	Alex Díaz de la Portilla	24,195	46.3%
Total votes		52,248	

July 25, 2017 Special Republican Primary, Florida Senate District 40
Party	Candidate	Votes	%
Republican	José Félix Díaz	7,678	57.8%
Republican	Alex Díaz de la Portilla	3,398	25.6%
Republican	Lorenzo J. Palomares	2,217	16.7%
Total votes		13,293	

Florida House of Representatives
Preceded by Carlos Manrique	Member of the Florida House of Representatives from the 115th district 1994–2000	Succeeded by Renier Díaz de la Portilla
Florida Senate
Preceded by Alberto Gutman	Member of the Florida Senate from the 34th district 2000–2002	Succeeded by Debbie Wasserman Schultz
Preceded by Kendrick Meek	Member of the Florida Senate from the 36th district 2002–2010	Succeeded by Miguel Díaz de la Portilla
Preceded by Daniel Webster	Majority Leader of the Florida Senate; 2008–2010	Succeeded by Andy Gardiner
Political offices
Preceded by Willy Gort	Member of the Miami City Commission from the 1st district 2020–2023	Succeeded by Miguel Ángel Gabela
