= 2000 Miami-Dade County mayoral election =

- September 5, 2000
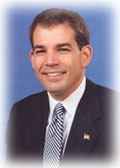

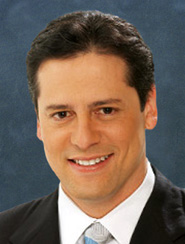

Candidate	Alex Penelas	Miguel Díaz de la Portilla	Jay Love
Party	Nonpartisan	Nonpartisan	Nonpartisan
Popular vote	133,686	54,088	51,836
Percentage	51.64%	20.89%	20.02%
Mayor before election
Alex Penelas
Nonpartisan
Elected mayor
Alex Penelas
Nonpartisan

The 2000 Miami-Dade County mayoral election took place on September 5, 2000. Incumbent Mayor Alex Penelas ran for re-election to a second term. He faced nine opponents, including County Commissioner Miguel Díaz de la Portilla and businessman Jay Love. In the primary election, Penelas won a second term outright, receiving 52 percent of the vote and avoiding the need for a runoff election.

== Primary election ==
=== Candidates ===
- Alex Penelas, incumbent Mayor
- Miguel Díaz de la Portilla, County Commissioner
- Jay Love, businessman
- Al Woods, former retail worker, 1992 independent candidate for Congress
- Dave Slater, former WPLG traffic reporter
- Pamela Lynn Cheatham, aviation company executive
- Juan Armando Montes, deputy regional director for the State Comptroller's office
- Nicholas "Nick" Cappetta, legal technician
- Joseph Perea, Miami-Dade Community College instructor
- Frank Cervoni, architect

=== Results ===
2000 Miami-Dade County mayoral election
Party	Candidate	Votes	%
Nonpartisan	Alex Penelas (inc.)	133,686	51.64%
Nonpartisan	Miguel Díaz de la Portilla	54,088	20.89%
Nonpartisan	Jay Love	51,836	20.02%
Nonpartisan	Al Woods	4,497	1.74%
Nonpartisan	Dave Slater	4,095	1.58%
Nonpartisan	Pamela Lynn Cheatham	3,968	1.53%
Nonpartisan	Juan Armando Montes	2,846	1.10%
Nonpartisan	Nicholas "Nick" Cappetta	1,606	0.62%
Nonpartisan	Joseph Perea	1,274	0.49%
Nonpartisan	Frank Cervoni	1,008	0.39%
Total votes		258,904	100.00%
