= Jim Eckhart =

American politician

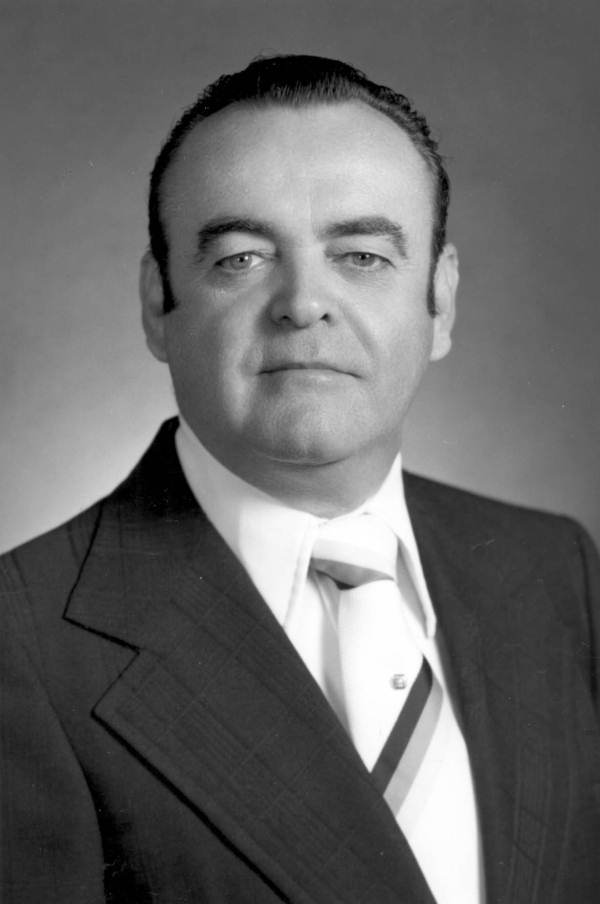
- Eckhart in 1976

Member of the Florida House of Representatives from the 115th district
- In office 1974–1980
- Preceded by: Murray Dubbin
- Succeeded by: Jim Brodie

Personal details
- Born: June 7, 1923 Camden, New Jersey, U.S.
- Died: October 17, 2007 (aged 84)
- Party: Democratic

James F. Eckhart (June 7, 1923 – October 17, 2007) was an American politician. He served as a Democratic member for the 115th district of the Florida House of Representatives.

== Life and career ==
Eckhart was born in Camden, New Jersey. He served in the United States Army Air Force during World War II.

In 1974, Eckhart was elected to represent the 115th district of the Florida House of Representatives, succeeding Murray Dubbin. He served until 1980, when he was succeeded by Jim Brodie.

Eckhart died in October 2007, at the age of 84.
