= Ileana Garcia =

American politician

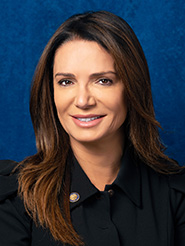

Member of the Florida Senate
- Incumbent
- Assumed office November 3, 2020
- Preceded by: José Javier Rodríguez
- Constituency: 37th district (2020–2022); 36th district (2022–present)

Personal details
- Born: Ileana Garcia Miami, Florida, U.S.
- Party: Republican

Ileana Garcia is an American politician who has served as a member of the Florida Senate since 2020. She is a member of the Republican Party.

== Early life ==
Garcia is an American of Cuban descent and was raised in Florida. She pursued working in both television and radio. Garcia identifies as a Christian.

== Political career ==
Garcia served as the first Hispanic female Deputy Press Secretary at the Department of Homeland Security under President Donald Trump. She founded the group Latinas for Trump and in 2016 was the Trump campaign's communications director for Latino outreach.

Garcia has served as Chair and Vice Chair of the Children, Families, and Elder Affairs Committee, Vice Chair of Community Affairs, Vice Chair of Appropriations Committee on Health and Human Services, Vice Chair of the Rules Committee, and has been named chair of Appropriations Committee on Criminal and Civil Justice for 2025.

Through appropriation requests, Garcia has brought monetary support to her constituents over the years, including funds to help kids aging out of the foster care system, food banks, road improvements, numerous anti-flooding initiatives, funding for the Miami Beach Holocaust Memorial, as well as millions of dollars for improvements and protections for Biscayne Bay.

As Chair of the Children, Families, and Elder Affairs Committee, Garcia supported the “No Patient Left Alone Act,” which strengthened patient visitation rights in hospitals and nursing homes. She also filed legislation to guarantee nursing home patients the right to record their rooms, and helped fund the Mia Casa facility for senior citizens experiencing homelessness. Garcia has also sponsored laws establishing a system in which schools can craft personalized “seizure action plans” for students with epilepsy has provided funding for Nicklaus Children’s Hospital’s Comprehensive Epilepsy Center, a Level 4 epilepsy center, designated by the National Association of Epilepsy Centers.

Garcia initiated measures to improve boating safety, enhance background screenings for apartment workers with potential access to living units, ban minors from getting a social media account, introduced a bill aimed at increasing oversight of community association managers and community association management firms, filed a bill aimed at improving Florida’s guardianship system, and was appointed to the Florida Alliance to End Human Traffickings Board of Directors.

In March 2022 during debate for the Parental Rights in Education bill in the Florida Senate, Garcia stated, "Gay is not a permanent thing. LGBT is not a permanent thing, and it’s not a bad thing," and then told a personal story about a friend who is transgender. Garcia later apologized for failing “to convey the complexity and nuances of this matter,” and denounced those who sent her threats of physical harm.

In June 2025, Garcia criticized Stephen Miller and the Trump Administration's immigration policy during his second term, though she did not criticize Trump himself.

== Electoral history ==
=== 2022 ===
Florida Senate District 36 – General Election (2022)
Party	Candidate	Votes	%
Republican	Ileana Garcia (incumbent)	75,773	59.0%
Democratic	Raquel Pacheco	52,600	41.0%
Total votes		128,373	100%

=== 2020 ===
Florida Senate District 37 – General Election (2020)
Party	Candidate	Votes	%
Republican	Ileana Garcia	104,630	48.5%
Democratic	Jose Javier Rodriguez (incumbent)	104,598	48.5%
No Party Affiliation	Alex Rodriguez	6,382	3.0%
Total votes		215,610	100%

The 2020 Florida Senate District 37 results triggered a manual and machine recount. Garcia won by a margin of 32 votes. This election came under scrutiny by local news outlets due to the inclusion of independent candidate Alex Rodríguez on the ballot. Alex shares the same surname as then incumbent Democrat José Javier Rodríguez and received more than 6,000 votes without campaigning. Former state senator Frank Artiles was arrested and found guilty of 3 counts of election fraud involved with funding Alex Rodríguez as a "ghost candidate." Alex Rodriguez also plead guilty to two campaign finance charges in a plea deal to cooperate with the investigation into Artiles. Miami-Dade County State Attorney emphasized there was no evidence that Senator Ileana Garcia knew of or partook in the plot, and Garcia has denied involvement.

Florida Senate
Preceded by José Javier Rodríguez	Member of the Florida Senate from the 36th district 2020–present	Incumbent
