= Javier Souto =

American politician (born 1938)

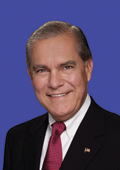

Member of the Miami-Dade County Commission from the 10th district
- In office April 22, 1993 – November 22, 2022
- Preceded by: District created
- Succeeded by: Anthony Rodriguez

Member of the Florida Senate from the 40th district
- In office November 8, 1988 – November 3, 1992
- Preceded by: Dexter Lehtinen
- Succeeded by: Daryl Jones (redistricting)

Member of the Florida House of Representatives from the 115th district
- In office November 6, 1984 – November 8, 1988
- Preceded by: Tim Murphy
- Succeeded by: Mario Díaz-Balart

Personal details
- Born: December 15, 1938 (age 87) Sancti Spíritus, Cuba
- Party: Republican
- Spouse: Berta Cepero
- Children: 3
- Education: University of Havana; Miami Dade College; University of Miami (B.A.)
- Occupation: Marketing

Javier D. Souto (born December 12, 1938) is a Republican politician from Florida who served as a member of the Miami-Dade County Commission from 1993 to 2022. He previously served in the Florida Legislature, representing the 115th district in the House of Representatives from 1984 to 1988 and the 40th district in the Senate from 1988 to 1992.

== Early life ==
Souto was born in Sancti Spíritus, Cuba, and graduated from La Salle High School in Havana in 1956. He later attended Villanova University and the University of Havana. Souto immigrated to the United States in 1960, and later participated in the Bay of Pigs Invasion in 1961. After settling in Miami, he attended Miami Dade College and graduated from the University of Miami in 1967. Souto worked in marketing for Burroughs Wellcome.

== Florida House of Representatives ==
In 1984, Souto ran for the Florida House of Representatives from the 115th district, challenging State Representative Tim Murphy, a Democrat. He was one of several Cuban-American Republicans challenging incumbent Democrats in districts with growing Hispanic populations. He defeated Murphy by a wide margin, winning 57 percent of the vote to Murphy's 43 percent. He was re-elected in 1986, defeating Democrat Dennis Regan in a landslide, winning 71 percent of the vote.

== Florida Senate ==
In 1988, Souto initially planned on seeking re-election, but when State Senator Dexter Lehtinen resigned from the legislature to serve as U.S. Attorney, Souto ran to succeed him in the 40th district. He won the Republican primary over Ted Lyons, and narrowly defeated former State Senator Dick Anderson in the general election, winning 53 percent of the vote to Anderson's 47 percent. Souto ran for re-election in 1990, and defeated State Representative Tom Easterly by a thin margin, receiving 52 percent of the vote to Easterly's 48 percent.

== 1992 congressional campaign ==
Following the 1990 census, the 21st congressional district was created, and Souto ran to represent it in 1992. He was defeated by fellow State Senator Lincoln Díaz-Balart in the Republican primary by a wide margin, winning just 31 percent of the vote to Díaz-Balart's 69 percent.

== Miami-Dade County Commission ==
In 1992, Judge Donald Graham struck down the at-large election system for the Miami-Dade County Commission, and ordered that a special election take place under newly drawn districts on March 16, 1993. Souto ran to represent the 10th district, which included Kendall, Westchester, and parts of Miami. He faced incumbent Commission Charles Dusseau in the election, and the two advanced to a runoff after no candidate received a majority of the vote. Souto narrowly defeated Dusseau, winning 53 percent of the vote to his 47 percent, in a race that was sharply divided on racial lines. He was sworn in on April 22, 1993.

Souto was re-elected without opposition in 1994, 1998, and 2002.

In 2006, he was challenged by Community Council member Millie Herrera, and won re-election in a landslide. He defeated Mimi Planas in 2010, and Marina Meadows in 2014, avoiding runoffs each time.

Souto ran for a seventh term in 2018, and faced four opponents, including Jose Garrido, one of his former staffers. The Miami Herald endorsed Garrido, praising Souto as a "powerhouse of constituent service," but stating that "it's time for a new commission representative," criticizing him for "seem[ing] unfocused at commission meetings," "go[ing] off on tangents," and "inadvertently delaying or derailing whatever commission matter is being discussed." However, Souto won re-election by a wide margin, receiving 62 percent of the vote to Garrido's 14 percent.

After county voters approved term limits for county commission members in 2012, Souto was unable to seek another term in 2022. He was succeeded by Republican State Representative Anthony Rodriguez.
