= Florida's 115th House of Representatives district =

Florida district

Florida's 115th State House of Representatives district
Representative
Omar Blanco; R–Miami

Florida's 115th House of Representatives district elects one member of the Florida House of Representatives. It contains parts of Miami-Dade County.

== Members ==
- Javier Souto (until 1988)
- Mario Díaz-Balart (November 8, 1988 – November 3, 1992)
- Carlos Manrique (1992–1994)
- Alex Díaz de la Portilla (November 8, 1994 – January 25, 2000)
- Renier Díaz de la Portilla (2000–2002)
- Michael Bileca (2012–2018)
- Vance Aloupis (2018–2022)
- Alina Garcia (2022–2024)
- Omar Blanco (since 2024)
