= Manny Díaz Jr. =

American politician

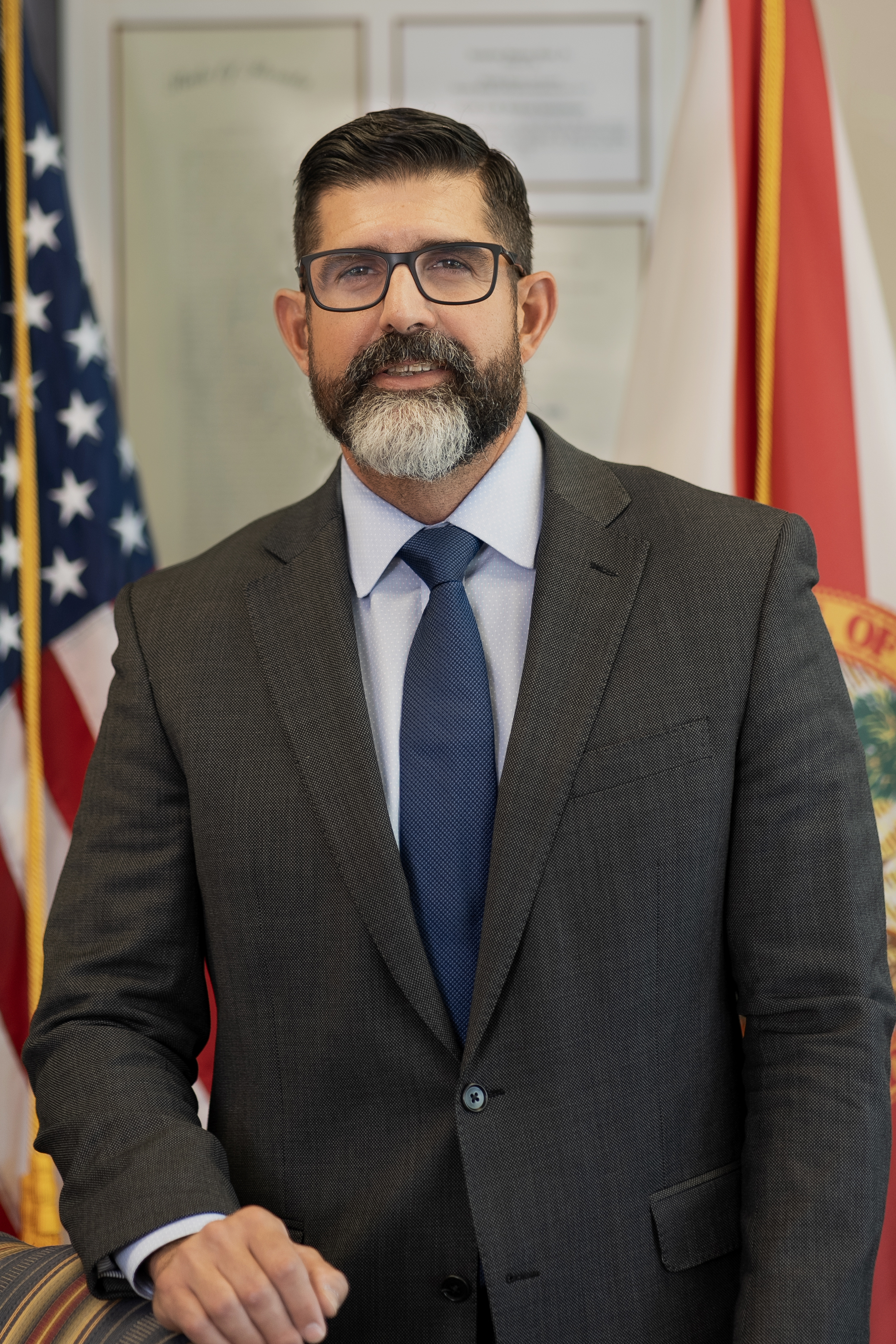
- Official portrait, 2023

7th President of the University of West Florida
- Incumbent
- Assumed office January 8, 2026
- Governor: Ron DeSantis
- Preceded by: Martha Dunagin Saunders

28th Education Commissioner of Florida
- In office June 1, 2022 – July 12, 2025
- Preceded by: Richard Corcoran
- Succeeded by: Anastasios Kamoutsas

Member of the Florida Senate from the 36th district
- In office November 6, 2018 – May 31, 2022
- Preceded by: René García
- Succeeded by: Bryan Avila (redistricting)

Member of the Florida House of Representatives from the 103rd district
- In office November 6, 2012 – November 6, 2018
- Preceded by: Redistricted
- Succeeded by: Cindy Polo

Personal details
- Born: March 2, 1973 (age 53) Hialeah, Florida, U.S.
- Party: Republican
- Spouse: Jennifer Díaz
- Children: 4
- Education: St. Thomas University (BA); Nova Southeastern University (MS)
- Profession: Politician; educator

Manny Díaz Jr. (born March 2, 1973) is an American politician who is currently serving as the president of the University of West Florida. Díaz served as the 28th education commissioner of Florida from 2022–2025. A Republican, Díaz was a member of the Florida Senate from 2018 to 2022, representing the 36th district, which encompasses the Hialeah area in northwest Miami-Dade County. He also served three terms in the Florida House of Representatives from 2012 to 2018, which encompassed parts of Hialeah and Northwest Miami-Dade County, Florida.

== Background ==
Díaz was born in Hialeah, graduated from Miami Springs High School, and attended St. Thomas University, where he graduated with a degree in human resources in 1994. He then attended Nova Southeastern University, graduating with a master's degree in educational leadership in 1998. In 2006 Díaz completed the Harvard University Graduate School of Education Principal's Summer Institute as part of the Superintendent's Urban Principal Initiative.

== Education career ==
=== Secondary school teacher (1995-2013) ===
Díaz first worked as a teacher and baseball coach at Miami Springs High School. From 1995 to 1999, he taught social studies at Hialeah-Miami Lakes High School, where he spent eight years as an assistant principal. In 2013, he was assistant principal at George T. Baker Aviation School, a public vocational school near Miami International Airport.

Díaz denied allegations of discussions about partying and inappropriate comment to a female student during his teaching career in the 1990’s, Díaz attributed the decades old allegations to political attacks by a democratic marketing consultant who was employed by the Biden campaign in 2020. Diaz also showed evidence of positive media posts over the years from the same person.

In 2012, Díaz filed for bankruptcy, citing $1.3 million in debts as a result of dissolution of several business partnerships and properties.

=== Doral College (2013-2022) ===
From 2013 to 2022, Díaz worked for Doral College, a private college affiliated with the for-profit Academica charter school operator founded by Fernando Zulueta. For most of this time, he was its chief operating officer. Doral College was unable to pursue accreditation by Southern Association of Colleges and Schools; eventually it received accreditation from a U.S. Department of Education approved national accreditor.The school’s general education courses are all listed on the state common course listing along with the state colleges. While serving as the Doral College, Florida Senate Diaz supporting funding for charter schools.

=== University of West Florida (2025-) ===
Díaz was named interim president of UWF starting July 14, 2025, following the resignation of Martha Dunagin Saunders. While interim president, he fired the university's general counsel after she objected to his hiring of Lawson Huck Gonzalez, a Ron DeSantis-linked law firm, as outside counsel for the presidential search.

Díaz was appointed President of the University of West Florida on January 8, 2026, with a starting salary of $950,000. The selection process was characterized by some controversy. Search requirements were implemented to allow Díaz's lack of a doctoral degree, Diaz holds a graduate degree in Educational Leadership. Díaz's history as an advocate of charter school expansion was another matter of concern, even as universities are statutorily authorized to sponsor charters that may function as lab schools with each university. Diaz announced in April 2026 that UWF is moving to Division 1 athletics in the fall of 2026. UWF set records for highest enrollment, fundraising and state performance metrics during Díaz’s first year, which were established from the legacy that Dr. Saunders created.

== Political career ==
In 2010, Díaz ran for the Miami-Dade County School Board, but lost to Perla Tabares Hantman in the primary, receiving only 39% of the vote to her 61%.

=== Florida House of Representatives ===
In 2012, following the reconfiguration of Florida House of Representatives districts, Díaz ran in the newly created 103rd district in the Republican primary against former state representative Renier Díaz de la Portilla and Alfredo Naredo-Acosta. Despite the nastiness and perceived closeness of the race, Díaz ended up defeating his opponents by a wide margin, winning 55% of the vote to Díaz de la Portilla's 39% and Naredo-Acosta's 6%. He faced only write-in opposition in the general election and won by a wide margin. Díaz went on to be re-elected in 2014 and 2016.

He was Chair of the Choice and Innovation and K-12 Appropriations committee during his tenure. He was a key member of Representative José R. Oliva's team. Oliva rose to become the second Cuban-American speaker of the House in Florida. Diaz became known as the education policy expert in the house, having his fingerprints on every piece of substantive legislation during his time in the house.

=== Florida Senate ===
In 2018, Díaz was elected to the Florida Senate District 36, defeating Democrat David Perez 54.1% to 45.9%. His re-election bid received substantial funding from health care and education companies. Díaz was Chair of the Senate Education committee from 2018 to 2020 and chaired the Senate Health Policy committee from 2020 to 2022.

During the 2022 legislative session, Díaz was the sole Republican to vote against the congressional redistricting plan, thus signaling his alignment to Governor Ron DeSantis.

=== Florida Commissioner of Education ===
On June 1, 2022, he assumed the office of Education Commissioner after his predecessor, Richard Corcoran, stepped down. In 2024, the Florida Board of Governors eliminated sociology as a core course at its public universities. Díaz said, "Sociology has been hijacked by left-wing activists and no longer serves its intended purpose as a general knowledge course for students."

== Political positions ==
=== Education ===
While serving in the legislature, Díaz sponsored legislation that would "allow more private online education providers, some from outside Florida," to offer classes to public school students; allow students to take classes in public virtual schools in other counties, and require the Florida Department of Education "to create a catalogue of online offerings."

He rejected allegations of conflict of interest when, in 2017, he sponsored, along with Richard Corcoran and Michael Bileca, legislation that directed $140 million of public funds to charter schools. The three men and their wives were involved in the charter school industry. Diaz’s wife was a non paid board member at a Tallahassee area classical charter school.

Díaz authored and sponsored the 2019 Family Empowerment Scholarship legislation and in 2020 a bill that significantly expanded publicly-funded vouchers for private schools, seen as the largest expansion of school choice in the nation by many. Florida is considered the top school choice state in the nation by many rankings thanks to this expansion. Diaz also created the Florida Charter Innovation Center at Miami Dade College and the Adam Smith Center at Florida International University during his tenure in the senate.

=== Public health ===
During the COVID-19 pandemic, Díaz opposed COVID-19 vaccine requirements. In 2021, Díaz also said that he wanted to "review" any additional vaccine requirements for students, such as those for mumps and measles. As of September 2021, Díaz had not been vaccinated against COVID-19.

=== Culture wars ===
In 2022, Díaz sponsored SB148/ HB7 in the Florida Senate, the "anti-woke" legislation backed by Governor Ron DeSantis. After the legislation was signed into law in April 2022, Chief U.S. district judge Mark E. Walker blocked some employment provisions of the law in November 2022. In his 139-page decision, he called the law "positively dystopian." The court did not affect the K-12 portions of this legislation.

== Personal life ==
Díaz was a four year letterman college baseball player at St. Thomas University where he played for head coach Al Avila. Díaz's second wife, Jennifer, worked in Miami Dade Public Schools and in Miami-Dade charter schools. They married on December 11, 2010. She is former vice-chair of the governing board of the Tallahassee Classical School, affiliated with Hillsdale College. They have three children. Díaz's son Dominic, from his first marriage to Linet Gonzalez, played baseball at Longwood University.

Florida House of Representatives
Preceded by Barbara Watson	Member of the Florida House of Representatives from the 103rd district 2012–2018	Succeeded by Cindy Polo
Florida Senate
Preceded by René García	Member of the Florida Senate from the 36th district 2018–2022	Succeeded by TBA
Political offices
Preceded by Richard Corcoran	Education Commissioner of Florida; 2022–present	Incumbent
