= 2011 Miami-Dade County mayoral recall election =

- March 15, 2011
- Shall Carlos Álvarez be recalled from the office of Mayor?

Results
Choice	Votes	%
Yes	183,652	88.10%
No	24,796	11.90%
Valid votes	208,448	99.59%
Invalid or blank votes	864	0.41%
Total votes	209,312	100.00%
Registered voters/turnout	1,212,205	17.27%
Mayor before election
Carlos Álvarez
Republican
Mayor after election
Vacant

The 2011 Miami-Dade County mayoral recall election was a recall election that saw the voters of Miami-Dade County, Florida vote to remove mayor of Miami-Dade County Carlos Álvarez from office.

The election was held coincidingly with a vote that also saw Miami-Dade county commissioner Natacha Seijas also successfully recalled.

In terms of population, the county was considered the largest United States municipality to recall its executive. The county was also, at the time, the second-largest recall vote of any kind in the United States, after the 2003 California gubernatorial recall election.

Months after the vote, a special election was held to fill the vacant mayoralty.

== Background ==
=== Previous effort ===
An earlier effort to recall the mayor had been launched in December 2009, being motivated by the mayor's failures in handling the county's budget deficit and his double-digit increases to the wages of county advisors. In January 2010, several local unions (including AFSCME Local 121 and Transport Workers Union Local 291) gave their support to the effort. However, this effort ultimately fell short of collecting the 52,108 petition signatures needed to force a recall.

=== Recall campaign ===
The recall effort against Mayor Álvarez began in late-September 2010, shortly after the Miami-Dade County Board of County Commissioners passed a budget which both raised property taxes and increased the salaries of county employees. The property tax increase was harshly received by voters of the county, who were still notably reeling from the impact of the Great Recession.

The recall effort was led and financially-backed by billionaire Norman Braman.

== Election results ==
2011 Miami-Dade County mayoral recall election
Vote on recall	Votes	Percentage
Yes	183,652	88.10
No	24,796	11.90
Totals	208,448	100
Voter turnout	17.27%	
