= Sigma Lambda Beta =

Collegiate fraternity in the United States

- ΣΛΒ
- Founded: April 4, 1986; 40 years ago University of Iowa
- Type: Social
- Affiliation: Independent
- Former affiliation: CNHL; NALFO; NIC
- Status: Active
- Emphasis: Service
- Scope: International
- Motto: "Opportunity for Wisdom, Wisdom for Culture"
- Pillars: Brotherhood, Scholarship, Community Service, Cultural Awareness
- Colors: Royal Purple; Pure White
- Flower: Red carnation
- Mascot: White stallion mustang
- Publication: El Iluminador
- Philanthropy: Victor Correa CPR Awareness Day
- Chapters: 151 undergraduate 3 associate 42 alumni networks
- Members: 777 active >14,000 lifetime
- Nickname: Betas, Lambda Betas, SLB
- Headquarters: 7 Hawkeye Dr. Suite 103-104; North Liberty, Iowa 52317; United States
- Website: www.sigmalambdabeta.com

Sigma Lambda Beta International Fraternity, Incorporated (ΣΛΒ) is a multicultural fraternity with historically-Latino roots. It was founded in 1986 at the University of Iowa in Iowa City, Iowa.

== History ==
Sigma Lambda Beta fraternity was founded at the University of Iowa on April 4, 1986. Its founder was Baltazar Mendoza-Madrigal, along with seventeen other men. Mendoza-Madrigal, a member of Phi Beta Sigma fraternity, was inspired by the significant contributions of his fraternity to the African American community and recognized a similar need within the Latino community.

The founding meeting, held on March 7, 1986, at the Chicano Native American Cultural Center (now the Latino Native American Cultural Center), brought together diverse students from different cultural backgrounds to discuss the feasibility of the new fraternity. The overwhelming support and collective enthusiasm at the meeting led to the formal establishment of the fraternity, with its ideology and philosophy solidified on its founding date. The list of the Founding Fathers of the Fraternity are the following:

- Bro. Mario Buendia
- Bro. Enrique Carbajal
- Bro. Thomas Carrasquillo
- Bro. Manuel Chavarria
- Bro. Jose Fong
- Bro. Rodolfo Garza
- Bro. Luis Jimenez
- Bro. Luis Marquez
- Bro. Baltazar Mendoza-Madrigal
- Bro. Eric Montes
- Bro. Kuy Ou
- Bro. Olakunle Oyeyemi
- Bro. Jaime Ramirez
- Bro. Olivero Rivera
- Juan Jose Rojas-Cardona (Disaffiliated)
- Bro. Eugenio Soria
- Bro. Juan Valdez
- Bro. Ricardo Zamudio

In early 1990, former founding Brother Juan Jose Rojas-Cardona was expelled from the fraternity after him and five other members of the University of Iowa's student government were found guilty of embezzling nearly $2,000 in funds. That same year Sigma Lambda Beta assisted with the establishment of Sigma Lambda Gamma sorority. Despite the aid provided in its creation, the sorority is not constitutionally bound to Sigma Lambda Gamma. Soon after the creation of the sorority, Sigma Lambda Beta, along with Phi Beta Sigma, Zeta Phi Beta sorority, and Sigma Lambda Gamma, formed the First Inter-Racially Mixed (F.I.R.M) Family network. F.I.R.M. was created to embody a shared commitment to unity and mutual support across the four different Greek letter organizations.

In the 21st century, Sigma Lambda Beta's membership grew beyond its Hispanic-Latino origins. The organization eventually withdrew from the National Association of Latino Fraternal Organizations (NALFO) due to its increasingly multicultural membership and focus, which no longer aligned with the regulations required of NALFO's membership criteria.

In 2025, the fraternity had 777 active collegiate members and 14,000 total initiates. Its national headquarters is in North Liberty, Iowa.

== Symbols ==
Sigma Lambda Beta's motto is "Opportunity for Wisdom, Wisdom for Culture". Its principles or pillars are Brotherhood, Scholarship, Community Service, and Cultural Awareness.

The fraternity's colors are royal purple and pure white. Its flower is the red carnation. Its mascot is the white stallion mustang. Its publication is El Iluminador. Its nicknames are Betas, Lambda Betas, and SLB.

== Chapters ==
Sigma Lambda Beta has chartered 151 chapters in over thirty states in the United States. It also has 3 associate chapters and 42 alumni networks.

== Activities ==
BetaCon is the fraternity's biennial convention. Its Leadership Institute is a three-day conference held every other year, alternating with BetaCon, where collegiate brothers are taught how to enhance their leadership and organizational skills to better meet the mission of the fraternity.

== Philanthropy ==
The Víctor Correa CPR Awareness Day was created in honor of Victor "Ziggy" Correa Ortiz, a Sigma Lambda Beta member who drowned during an accident where none of the bystanders knew how to administer CPR. The fraternity encourages its members to host CPR training and awareness events.

In 2001, members of the fraternity formed the Sigma Lambda Beta International Fraternity Inc.'s Educational Foundation as a 501(c) tax-exempt organization. The money raised by the Sigma Lambda Beta Education Foundation is used mainly to fund educational and leadership development programs for Sigma Lambda Beta, as well as for scholarships that are made available to undergraduate and graduate student members.

== Member and chapter misconduct ==
In 1990, one of the fraternity’s founders, Juan Jose Rojas-Cardona, was expelled from Sigma Lambda Beta after he and other student government leaders at the University of Iowa were found guilty of misusing student funds. In the mid-1990s, he faced theft and forgery charges in the United States before fleeing to Mexico, where he later became a wealthy casino operator. By the 2000s, media and diplomatic reports had linked him to drug trafficking, organized crime, and the 2007 assassination of a rival casino owner in Monterrey, Mexico. He and his family drew further national attention in 2012, when they donated over $200,000 to President Barack Obama’s re-election campaign, contributions that were ultimately returned.

In March 2015, the University of Nebraska–Lincoln chapter of Sigma Lambda Beta was temporarily suspended following allegations of hazing. According to the university, the fraternity’s international office received complaints, leading to an investigation by police. The alleged hazing was reported to be non-physical. The university's Greek Affairs office and Sigma Lambda Beta International Fraternity conducted independent investigations into the matter, but no specific details regarding individuals or acts involved were made public.

In February 2019, at the University of Nebraska at Kearney. The chapter was suspended due to allegations of misconduct. The suspension halted all fraternity operations, including social events and academic programming, pending investigations by both the university and law enforcement authorities. That same year in November, more than 30 students held a sit-in at the Rho Alpha chapter's informational meeting at Florida State University. It was reported that the protest concerned the chapter’s alleged handling of a student’s accusation that a member had sexually assaulted her. According to the report, the chapter president canceled the meeting after a confrontation with protesters, and fraternity members left without answering their follow-up questions.

In March 2020, founding father Baltazar Mendoza Madrigal was admitted to Stateville Correctional Center to serve a nine-year sentence after being convicted of felony theft exceeding one million dollars. He was subsequently released under supervision in September 2021. That same year, the Sigma Lambda Beta chapter at the University of California, Davis, was placed on revocation of registration until at least spring 2025 due to hazing-related incidents.

In 2021, the fraternity's chapter at the University of Texas at Austin faced disciplinary action for hazing violations. New members were reportedly required to wear specific attire and blindfolds during activities, sing songs in unison before exiting rooms, and answer questions amidst loud music, leading to concerns about mental health threats. The university imposed conditional registration on the chapter from November 2021 through December 2022.

In April 2025, the Sigma Alpha chapter of Sigma Lambda Beta at DePaul University faced controversy after various chapter alumni were found to have made homophobic remarks online after its undergraduate members hosted a drag event called the "Purple Reign Extravaganza" which aimed at challenging machismo and promoting LGBTQ+ inclusion. Fraternity alumni both within and outside the chapter criticized the event as being disgraceful and inconsistent with the fraternity’s values, which upset various undergraduate members of the chapter and others within the local community. The fraternity's national leadership did not release a formal response to the incident.

== See also ==
- List of social fraternities and sororities
