= Carlos Álvarez (American politician) =

Cuban American politician

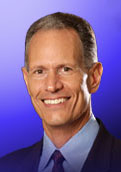

6th Mayor of Miami-Dade County
- In office November 6, 2004 – March 18, 2011
- Preceded by: Alex Penelas
- Succeeded by: Carlos A. Giménez

Personal details
- Born: September 30, 1952 Havana, Cuba
- Party: Republican
- Children: 3
- Education: Florida International University (BBA)
- Profession: Police officer, politician

Carlos Álvarez (born September 30, 1952) is a Cuban American politician, and the former mayor of Miami-Dade County. He was first elected mayor in 2004, and re-elected in 2008. His mayoralty ended in March 2011 after a recall election. In both mayoral elections, he listed his party as "No Party Preference", but an article in The Christian Science Monitor described him as a member of the Republican Party.

== Early life ==
Carlos Álvarez was born in Cuba September 30, 1952. When he was eight years old, his family emigrated to Miami, Florida. Alvarez earned his Bachelor of Business Administration from Florida International University in 1974. He completed training at the Senior Management Institute for Police and graduated from the FBI National Academy, 145th Session in June 1986.

== Police work ==
Fred Taylor (Álvarez's predecessor as police director), Miami-Dade Mayor Alex Penelas, and Álvarez at a 1997 press conference

In 1976, Álvarez joined the Miami-Dade Police Department. He was promoted through the ranks and, in 1997, became director of the MDPD. He served as director from 1997 to 2004. His tenure as director was called "relatively free of trouble, at least by local standards" by the Miami New Times, although in 2004 a group of policemen who served in the department described his management style as marked by "favoritism and retaliation".

== Mayoralty ==
Carlos Álvarez ran for mayor in the 2004 Miami-Dade mayoral election, and defeated his opponent County Commissioner Jimmy L. Morales. He became Miami-Dade County's sixth mayor, replacing Alex Penelas. In 2007, Alvarez successfully launched a referendum to give the mayoralty more power, giving him direct control of the county's bureaucracy.

He was re-elected as county mayor on August 26, 2008, for his second term. In 2009, Alvarez led a successful yet controversial effort to spend hundreds of millions of dollars of the city's money to build what would eventually be LoanDepot Park on the site of the Orange Bowl to retain the Major League Baseball Marlins in the region. In August 2009, The Miami Herald revealed that Alvarez had recently given pay raises to close aides, including his chief of staff Dennis Morales, whose new salary was over $200,000 a year. In September 2010, Alvarez pushed for a 12% increase in the property tax rate.

== Recall ==
An effort to recall Alvarez began in October 2010, backed by billionaire businessman Norman Braman, a former owner of the Philadelphia Eagles, over Alvarez's simultaneous tax increases and pay raises for upper echelon county workers. Braman spent more than $1 million of his own money on the effort. Alvarez was recalled in a March 15, 2011 election. More than 88% of the voters (some 176,000 people) voted for recalling Alvarez. The election was the largest municipal recall vote in United States history, and the second largest in the U.S. of any kind after the 2003 recall election of California governor Gray Davis. He officially left office on March 18, 2011 when the county canvassing board certified the results.

== Personal life ==
Álvarez was divorced twice, and is the father of two sons and one daughter. His eldest son, Carlos Alvarez Jr., is a convicted serial rapist and registered sexual predator.

After the recall, Álvarez began bodybuilding. In January 2013, he emerged from relative seclusion to compete in the National Physique Committee's South Florida “Over 60s” Master's bodybuilding competition, where he won first place.

In April 2016, he was arrested on a domestic battery charge after a fight with his girlfriend. According to the police report, his girlfriend's teenage daughter told police that Álvarez had been violent toward her mother since 2013.

== See also ==
- List of mayors of Miami-Dade County, Florida
