= Jimmy Morales (American politician) =

American attorney and politician

- Morales as county commissioner in the late-1990s

Chief Operating Officer of Miami-Dade County
- In office December 2020 – June 4, 2026
- Appointed by: Daniella Levine Cava
- Preceded by: office established

City Manager of Miami Beach
- In office March 2013 – December 2020
- Preceded by: Jorge M. Gonzalez
- Succeeded by: Alina T. Hudak

Chair of the Miami-Dade County Democratic Party
- In office 2005 – January 2007
- Succeeded by: Joe Garcia

Member of the Miami-Dade County Commission from district 7
- In office January 1997 – January 2005
- Preceded by: Maurice Ferré
- Succeeded by: Carlos A. Giménez

Personal details
- Party: Democratic
- Spouse: Dori Foster
- Children: 2
- Education: Harvard (undergraduate and law)
- Profession: lawyer

Jimmy L. Morales is an American attorney and politician who formerly served as member of the of Miami-Dade County Commission (1997–2005); chair of the Miami-Dade County Democratic Party (2005–2007); city attorney of Marathon and of Doral; city manager of Miami Beach (2013–2020); and chief operating officer of Miami-Dade County (2020–2026). He unsuccessfully ran for Miami-Dade county mayor in 2004.

== Early life and education ==
Morales was born and raised on Miami Beach, Florida. He attended Biscayne Elementary School, Nautilus Junior High School, and Miami Beach Senior High School.

Morales graduated with an undergraduate degree from Harvard University with Magna Cum Laude recognition in 1984. He had been a member of Phi Beta Kappa. He graduated Magna Cum Laude from Harvard Law School in 1987.

== Legal career ==
As an attorney, Morales has held membership in the Dade County Bar Association, the Cuban American Bar Association, the National Hispanic Bar Association, and the Inter-American Bar Association.

After graduating law school, Morales clerked for U.S. District Court Judge Edward B. Davis in the Southern District of Florida. He then worked in international corporate law at firms in Washington, D.C. and New York City before returning to the Miami area in 1993.

Morales has previously practiced law at the firms Davis Polk & Wardwell, LLP; Debevoise & Plimpton LLP; and Morgan, Lewis & Bockius, P.A.

Morales was a shareholder and a member of the board of directors at the law firm Stearns Weaver Miller Weissler Alhadeff & Sitterson, P.A., where he specialized in corporate, international law, and local government law as an attorney.

In 2026, Morales returned to private practice at the firm Bilzin Sumberg, joining its Land Development & Government Relations Group.

== Miami-Dade County Commission (1997–2006) ==
Morales represented district 7 on the Miami-Dade County Commission for two terms. He won election to his seat in 1996 and 2000.

Morales served stints as chairman of the Budget and Finance Committee, as well as a stint as chairman of the Mayor's Task Force on Efficiency and Competition. Morales also served as the Miami-Dade Liaison to the Miami Downtown Development Authority and the Miami-Dade County League of City.

In 2004, Morales unsuccessfuly ran for county mayor.

== Chair of Miami–Dade County Democratic Party (2005–2007) and other work ==
In early 2005, Morales became chairman of the Miami-Dade County Democratic Party. He held this position until 2007.

In 2008, Morales was elected to serve as a Florida delegate to the 2008 Democratic National Convention.

Morales served as city attorney of Marathon, Florida. Morales also served as the city attorney of Doral, until leaving in 2013 to serve as city manager of Miami Beach. He also served as general counsel to the Florida Atlantic Research and Development Authority. He also served as a special master for Surfside, Miami Gardens, and North Miami. He also served as chief special master for Miami Beach.

== Miami Beach city manager (2013–2020) ==
Morales served as city manager of Miami Beach from 2013 to 2020. He was confirmed to the position in March 2013. The office saw him overseeing operations of a municipality with 2,200 employees and an operating budget of $625.6 million.

During his tenure as city manager, he oversaw major capital projects including a $620 million renovation of the Miami Beach Convention Center and in excess of $500 million of projects to water, sewer, and stormwater infrastructure.

Until March 2016, Morales served as hispanic outreach coordinator for the Democratic National Committee.

In 2018, Morales was considered a possible candidate in the Democratic primary the for the United States House of Representatives in Florida's 27th congressional district, but declined to run.

In October 2020, Morales announced that he would be resigning as city manager effective February 2021, with intention of being able to become involved in politics again in a way his nonpartisan city manager role had prevented him from. He left before the end of 2020 to take a position in county government.

== COO of Miami-Dade County (2020–2026) ==
Morales served as chief operating officer (COO) of Miami-Dade County for six years, from 2020 to 2026. This position made him one of the most powerful unelected officeholders in the county. The office saw him tasked with seeing day-to-day operations of the county government. He had been appointed to the office by county mayor Daniella Levine Cava in December 2020.

County departments that were under his oversight included the Aviation, Seaport, Transportation, Public Works, Housing and Community Development. In October 2025, the Departments of Cultural Affairs and Libraries were also added to his office's portfolio.

Among major projects that Morales was involved with as COO was a $1.7 billion dollar improvement program to the water and sewer systems; $12 billion capital program at Miami International Airport; $10 billion SMART Plan for transit expansion; and preparations to host games of the 2026 FIFA World Cup. Morales headed the County Mayor's Infrastructure Group, which secured the county $2 billion in state and federal infrastructure grants. He was also involved in contract negotiations with labor unions and organizations. He also was involved in the rescue and recovery response after the Surfside condominium building collapse.

Morales resigned on June 4, 2026, after a public disagreement with Mayor Levine Cava over the county government's acquisition of a marine fuel terminal on Fisher Island. Morales stood by the deal that he had negotiated to acquire it, while the mayor disagreed and sought to use eminent domain instead. Multiple other resignations wrestlers tenured over it, including Port Director Hyde Webb and Deputy Port Director Frederick Wong.

== Nonprofits and other local organizations ==
Morales serves on the Orange Bowl Committee and the board of the Leroy Collins Institute. He was formerly chair of The Miami Foundation. Moraleswas a board member of Leadership Florida. He also co-founded and served as co-chairman of the board for the Miami chapter of Autism Speaks.

Morales has also served as a member of the Board of Governors of the Miami Beach Chamber of Commerce; chairman of the board of directors for the Silver Knight Alumni Legacy Network; chairman of Heart of a Chef.

== Personal life ==
Morales and his wife, Dori Foster-Morales, have two children (daughter Nora Leigh and son, Peter Jay). Since 1999, Morales has resided in Coral Gables, Florida.
