= 2025 Miami mayoral election =

Mayoral election in Florida, US

- November 4, 2025 (first round); December 9, 2025 (runoff)

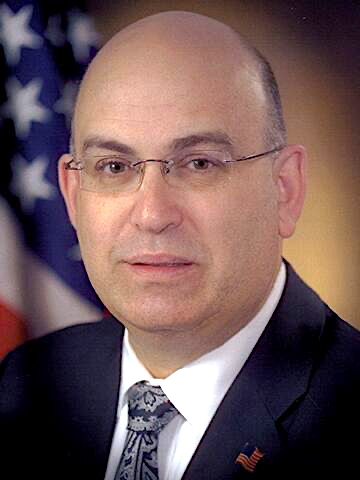

Candidate	Eileen Higgins	Emilio Gonzalez	Ken Russell
Party	Democratic	Republican	Democratic
First round	13,403; 35.95%	7,258; 19.47%	6,550; 17.57%
Runoff	22,145; 59.46%	15,099; 40.54%	Eliminated
Candidate	Joe Carollo	Alex Díaz de la Portilla	Xavier Suarez
Party	Republican	Republican	Independent
First round	4,277; 11.47%	1,929; 5.17%	1,841; 4.94%
Runoff	Eliminated	Eliminated	Eliminated
- Precinct runoff results Higgins: 50–60% 60–70% 70–80% 80–90% >90% Gonzalez: 50–60% 60–70% 70–80% >90% No votes
Mayor before election
Francis Suarez
Republican
Elected mayor
Eileen Higgins
Democratic

The 2025 Miami mayoral election had its initial round held on November 4, 2025, with a runoff election on December 9, 2025.

Incumbent Mayor Francis Suarez was term-limited and could not run for a third term. Miami holds runoffs if no mayoral candidate receives a majority of the vote. County Board member Eileen Higgins and former city manager Emilio Gonzalez advanced to the runoff. This was the first Miami mayoral election to advance to a runoff since 2001.

Higgins defeated Gonzalez in the runoff, making her the first Democrat to be elected mayor since 1997, the first elected by merit since 1993, and the first woman elected to lead Miami in the city's history.

== Background ==
Incumbent Mayor Francis Suarez was re-elected in 2021 with 78.6% of the vote, defeating opponent Max Martinez. He was term-limited, preventing him from running again in 2025.

== Scheduling ==
The 2025 election cycle was marred by early controversy. In June 2025, the Miami City Commission passed an ordinance that would change the election dates from odd-numbered to even-numbered years, citing voter turnout and the financial cost of elections as key factors. This ordinance would suspend the November 2025 elections until November 2026, giving incumbents an extra year in office. One of the candidates, Emilio Gonzalez, filed a lawsuit challenging the Commission's ordinance. Both the 11th Judicial Circuit and Third District Court of Appeal ruled in Gonzalez's favor, finding that the ordinance violated the Florida Constitution, the Miami-Dade County Home Rule Charter, and the City of Miami Charter. The City of Miami soon after filed a motion to obtain a rehearing en banc. This means that the entire Third District Court would hear the case as opposed to the customary three-judge panel.

== Candidates ==
=== Declared ===
==== Advanced to runoff ====
- Emilio Gonzalez, former city manager and former director of U.S. Citizenship and Immigration Services (Republican)
- Eileen Higgins, Miami-Dade County commissioner and candidate for Florida's 27th congressional district in 2022 (Democratic)

==== Eliminated in first round ====
- Laura Anderson (Socialist Workers Party)
- Elijah John Bowdre, Miami-Dade County Crypto Currency chairman (Republican)
- Joe Carollo, city commissioner and former mayor (Republican)
- Christian Cevallos, former member of the Miami-Dade Community Council for the 11th district and former Miami zoning czar (Republican)
- Alyssa Crocker, activist (Republican)
- Kenneth James DeSantis, attorney (Independent)
- Alex Díaz de la Portilla, former city commissioner and former state senator (Republican)
- Michael Hepburn, community activist and perennial candidate (Note: Hepburn previously had run for Congress in 2018 and 2020; state house in 2010, 2014, and 2020; state senate in 2020; Miami Board of Commissioners in 2021; Miami-Dade County Public Schools school board in 2024) (Democratic)
- Ken Russell, former city commissioner and candidate for Florida's 27th congressional district in 2022 (Democratic)
- June Savage, real estate agent and perennial candidate (Republican)
- Xavier Suarez, former mayor, former county commissioner, and father of incumbent Mayor Francis Suarez (Republican/Independent)

=== Withdrew ===
- Ijamyn Gray (Note: While Ijamyn Gray had launched a campaign, they were not among those who filed petitions by the ballot deadline) (Democratic)
- Maxwell Martinez, (Note: Maxwell Martinez withdrew prior to petition deadline) podcast producer and perennial candidate

=== Did not run/declined ===
Individuals who were substantially speculated to run, but who ultimately did not, included:

- Manolo Reyes, (Note: Reyes had announced plans to run, but died prior to the filing period for the election.) city commissioner
- Joe Sanchez, former city commissioner, candidate for sheriff of Miami–Dade in 2024, mayoral candidate in 2009
- Fred Voccola, (Note: Fred Voccola had expressed public interest in running, but was not among the candidates who filed to run) vice chairman and former CEO of Kaseya

== First round ==
=== Endorsements ===
Emilio Gonzalez (R)

U.S. senators

- Ted Cruz, U.S. senator from Texas (2013–present)
- Rick Scott, U.S. senator from Florida (2019–present)

Statewide officials

- Ron DeSantis, governor of Florida (2019–present)

Local officials

- Jorge Colina, former Miami Police Department chief (2018–2021)
- Rodolfo Llanes, former Miami Police Department chief (2014–2018)
- Manuel Orosa, former Miami Police Department chief (2011–2014)
- Juan Perez, former Miami-Dade Police Department director (Note: This appointed position was replaced by Miami-Dade sheriff, an elected position, in January 2025.) (2016–2020)
- David Rivero, former University of Miami police chief (2006–2025)
- Milton Vickers, former Miami director of human services (2018–2021)

Individuals

- Jorge Masvidal, UFC boxer
- Michael Putney, reporter and columnist

Labor unions

- American Federation of State, County and Municipal Employees Local 154

Organizations

- Associated Builders and Contractors Florida East Coast Chapter
- Log Cabin Republicans of Miami
- Miami Young Republicans
- Veterans for America First
Eileen Higgins (D)

State legislators

- Ashley Gantt, state representative from the 109th district (2022–present)
- Shevrin Jones, state senator from the 34th district (2020–present)
- Joe Saunders, former state representative from the 49th district (2012–2014)

Local officials

- Danielle Cohen Higgins, Miami-Dade County commissioner from the 8th district (2022–present)
- Javier Fernandez, mayor of South Miami (2022–present)
- Dan Gelber, former mayor of Miami Beach (2017–2023)
- Oliver Gilbert, Miami-Dade County commissioner from the 1st district (2020–present)
- Daniella Levine Cava, mayor of Miami-Dade County (2020–present)

Labor unions

- 1199SEIU United Healthcare Workers East and SEIU 32BJ
- Laborers' International Union of North America Local 1652
- UNITE HERE Local 355

Organizations

- EMILY's List
- Equality Florida Action PAC
- Ruth's List Florida
- SAVE Dade Action PAC

Newspapers and other media

- Miami Herald
Michael Hepburn (D)

Individuals

- Maxwell Martinez, entrepreneur and runner-up for mayor in 2021
Ken Russell (D)

Local officials

- Cindy Lerner, former mayor of Pinecrest (2008–2016)
- Philip Stoddard, former mayor of South Miami (2010–2020)
- Dean Trantalis, mayor of Fort Lauderdale (2018–present)

Individuals

- Marvin Dunn, historian, professor, filmmaker, 1985 mayoral candidate
- Udonis Haslem, retired NBA player

=== Polling ===
Poll source	Date(s) administered	Sample size (Note: Key: A – all adults RV – registered voters LV – likely voters V – unclear)	Margin of error	Joe Carollo	Emilio Gonzalez	Eileen Higgins	Ken Russell	Xavier Suarez	Undecided
MDW Communications (D) (Note: Poll sponsored by Ethical Leadership for Miami, which supports Higgins)	July 27 – August 1, 2025	511 (LV)	–	11%	15%	36%	12%	7%	19%

=== Debates and forums ===
Debates and forums
No.	Date	Host	Moderator(s)	Link	Participants												
Key: P Participant/Invited A Absent N Non-invitee O Out of race																	
Key: P Participant/Invited A Absent N Non-invitee O Out of race					Anderson	Bowdre	Carollo	Cevallos	Crocker	Gonzalez	Gray	Díaz de la Portilla	Hepburn	Higgins	Russell	Savage	Suarez
1	September 20, 2025	Various local & statewide organizations	Dwight Bullard; Michi Ceard Francois	YouTube	P	N	N	P	P	A	P	N	P	P	P	A	P
2	October 1, 2025	Downtown Neighbors Alliance, CBS Miami	Eliott Rodriguez	YouTube	N	N	P	N	N	P	O	P	N	P	P	N	P
3	October 5, 2025	Coconut Grove Democratic Club, Miami–Dade Democratic Party	Don Finefrock	YouTube	N	P	N	N	N	N	O	N	P	P	P	N	N
4	October 16, 2025	Biscayne Neighborhoods Association, NBC Miami, Miami Herald, Griffin Catalyst	Jackie Nespral and David Smiley	YouTube	N	N	A	N	N	P	O	N	N	P	P	N	P

=== Results ===
Turnout among registered voters was unofficially reported in excess of 21.6%, with more than 37,600 ballots being cast. There were 174,462 registered voters in Miami ahead of the first round.

2025 Miami mayoral election
Candidate	Votes	%
Eileen Higgins	13,403	35.95
Emilio Gonzalez	7,258	19.47
Ken Russell	6,550	17.57
Joe Carollo	4,277	11.47
Alex Díaz de la Portilla	1,929	5.17
Xavier Suarez	1,841	4.94
Michael A. Hepburn	688	1.85
Laura Anderson	415	1.11
Christian E. Cevallos	287	0.77
Kenneth James DeSantis	224	0.60
Elijah John Bowdre	180	0.48
Alyssa Crocker	147	0.39
June E. Savage	84	0.23
Total votes	37,283	100.00

== Runoff ==
=== Runoff endorsements ===
The following individuals and groups (who had not already endorsed either Gonzalez or Higgins ahead of the first round) made endorsements for the runoff:

Emilio Gonzalez (R)

2025 mayoral candidates

- Xavier Suarez, former Miami-Dade County commissioner (2011–2020) and former Miami mayor (1985–1993, 1997–1998)

Executive branch officials

- Donald Trump, president of the United States (2017–2021, 2025–present)

U.S. senators

- Ashley Moody, U.S. senator from Florida (2025–present)

U.S. representatives

- Byron Donalds, U.S. representative from Florida's 19th congressional district (2021–present)
- María Elvira Salazar, U.S. representative from Florida's 27th congressional district (2021–present)

Statewide officials

- Jay Collins, lieutenant governor of Florida (2025–present)

State legislators

- Paul Renner, former speaker of the Florida House of Representatives (2022–2024) from the 19th district (2015–2024)

Local officials

- Dariel Fernandez, Miami-Dade County tax collector (2025–present)
Eileen Higgins (D)

Executive branch officials

- Pete Buttigieg, former U.S. secretary of transportation (2021–2025) and former mayor of South Bend, Indiana (2012–2020)
- Rahm Emanuel, former U.S. ambassador to Japan (2022–2025) former mayor of Chicago (2011–2019), and former White House chief of staff (2009–10)

U.S. senators

- Ruben Gallego, U.S. senator from Arizona (2025–present)

U.S. representatives

- Debbie Wasserman-Schultz, U.S. representative from Florida's 25th congressional district (2005–present)
- Frederica Wilson, U.S. representative from Florida's 24th congressional district (2013–present)

Party officials

- Nikki Fried, chair of the Florida Democratic Party (2023–present) and former Florida commissioner of agriculture (2019–2023)
- Ken Martin, chair of the Democratic National Committee (2025–present)

Individuals

- Marvin Dunn, historian, professor, filmmaker, candidate in the 1985 mayoral election

Labor unions

- American Federation of State, County and Municipal Employees Local 1907
- Miami Association of Fire Fighters IAFF Local 587
- Miami Fraternal Order of Police Lodge #20
- Service Employees International Union Florida State Council
- Service Employees International Union Local 1991

Organizations

- Giffords PAC
- Miami Realtors PAC

=== Polling ===
Poll source	Date(s) administered	Sample size	Margin of error	Emilio Gonzalez	Eileen Higgins	Undecided
APL Consulting (Note: Poll sponsored by Mission Miami PAC, which supports Gonzalez)	November 21–23, 2025	307 (V)	± 5.9%	31%	34%	35%
MDW Communications (D)	October 14–18, 2025	307 (LV)	± 6.0%	24%	50%	26%

=== Debates and forums ===
Debates and forums
No.	Date	Host	Moderator	Link	Participants	
Key: P Participant/Invited A Absent N Non-invitee O Out of race						
Key: P Participant/Invited A Absent N Non-invitee O Out of race					Gonzalez	Higgins
1	November 13, 2025	League of Women Voters; ACLU of Florida; Miami Shenandoah Neighborhood Association; One Grove Alliance; ACDC (Note: The Allapattah Collaborative Community Development Corporation)	Nicole Perez	YouTube	P	P
2	November 25, 2025	CBS Miami	Jim DeFede	YouTube; CBS News	P	P

=== Results ===
2025 Miami mayoral runoff
Candidate	Votes	%
Eileen Higgins	22,145	59.46
Emilio Gonzalez	15,099	40.54
Total votes	37,244	100.00

== Notes ==
Partisan clients
