= Luis Garcia (politician) =

American politician (born 1945)

Luis R. García, Jr.
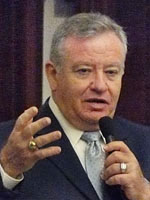

Member of the Florida House of Representatives from the 107th district
- In office November 7, 2006 - November 6, 2012
- Preceded by: Gustavo Barreiro
- Succeeded by: Redistricted

Personal details
- Born: December 8, 1945 (age 80) Marianao, Cuba
- Party: Democratic
- Education: Miami-Dade Community College (AS)
- Profession: Firefighter, Paramedic

Luis R. García, Jr. is a Democratic politician from Florida and the retired Fire Department Chief of Miami Beach. He served three terms in the Florida House of Representatives, representing parts of Miami Beach, Miami, and Coral Gables from 2006 to 2012. Previously, he served for seven years on the Miami Beach City Commission.

In 2012, rather than run for re-election to the House, García ran for the Miami-Dade County Commission in District 5. He was defeated by incumbent Bruno Barreiro in the general election, 52 to 48%.

State Representative Luis R. García, Jr.

== Early life and career ==
García was born in Marianao, Cuba on December 8, 1945 and moved to Florida in 1960. He was certified as an E.M.T. in 1974, and as a paramedic in 1977. He earned his Associate of Science degree from Miami-Dade Community College in 1990 in Emergency Medical Services Management. In 1997, he completed training as an Executive Fire Officer at the National Fire Academy in Emmitsburg, Maryland.

García was the first Cuban-American to serve with the Miami Beach Fire Department.

In 1996, García was named as the city's first Cuban-American Fire Chief. Under his watch, fire-related deaths were reduced to zero in 2 years. Identifying the vulnerability of Miami Beach during hurricane season, he launched a public awareness on "hurricane evacuation" and "high rise fire safety" that aired on public television.

== Political career ==
=== Miami Beach City Commission ===
After retiring as Miami Beach Fire Chief in 1999, García successfully ran for the Miami Beach City Commission and continued to serve in that capacity for 7 years. As a commissioner, García worked with bipartisan support to introduce the Florida Fire Safety Bill in 2002-03, sponsored by State Representative Gus Barreiro and State Senator Ron Silver. This legislation ensures that safety violations identified by fire departments do not go ignored. He also created the Senior Crime Task Force to protect Miami Beach's elderly citizens and the Condo Task Force to identify and deal with condominium legislation to protect the rights of individual owners.

=== Florida House of Representatives ===
In November 2006, García was elected to the Florida House of Representatives in District 107. He was subsequently re-elected in 2008 and 2010. His district included South Beach in addition to areas of Downtown Miami, Little Havana, Overtown, Allapattah, Coral Gables, Coconut Grove, Key Biscayne, Fisher Island, Coco Plum and a small section of Pinecrest.

He served as the Ranking Member on the State Affairs Committee in addition to serving on the State's Agriculture and Natural Resources Appropriations Committee; Agriculture and Natural Resources Subcommittee and the Federal Affairs Subcommittee. He is the past Vice-Chairman of the Miami-Dade County Legislative Delegation and is the former Vice-Chairman of the Florida Democratic Party and former Vice-Chairman of the Florida Legislative Hispanic Caucus.

In 2009, he was appointed by the Speaker of the House Larry Cretul to serve as one of five Florida leaders on The Education Commission of the States; a national education organization dedicated to helping states develop effective education policy.

In 2009, García was honored by the Florida Nurses Association as their "Legislator of the Year."

== Legislation ==
=== 2007 legislative session ===
- HB 409; Primary Sponsor; bill entitled "Criminal Sentencing": The bill prohibits suspending, deferring, or withholding adjudication of guilt or imposition of sentence if offense is attempted felony murder committed against law enforcement officer, correctional officer, state attorney, assistant state attorney, justice, or judge; conforms worksheet of Criminal Punishment Code. The Bill was signed into law by Florida's Governor on June 20, 2007.

=== 2008 legislative session ===
- HB 1; Primary Sponsor; bill entitled "Relief/Alan Jerome Crotzer/DFS": The bill provides for relief of Alan Jerome Crotzer for wrongful imprisonment & for being victim of miscarriage of justice. In 2006, after 24 and ½ years of wrongfully imprisonment Alan Crotzer was freed from prison. The bill directed the State of Florida to pay Mr. Crotzer $1,250,000; $50,000 for each year of wrongful imprisonment. The bill was passed as HB 7037 and signed into law by Florida's Governor on April 10, 2008. ArticleArticleArticle
- HB 1035; Primary Sponsor; bill entitled "Human Immunodeficiency Virus Testing": The bill provides conditions under which HIV test on blood sample of individual who has not given consent may be performed; requires documentation by certain medical personnel under supervision of licensed physician prior to testing in accordance with written protocols based on National Centers for Disease Control and Prevention guidelines. This bill protects Florida's First Responders who are exposed to bodily fluids while in the line of duty. Individuals exposed to HIV can be effectively treated against HIV infection by a prescribed drug regiment; however; early detection is essential to a successful treatment. The bill was passed as SB 1648 and signed into law by Florida's Governor on June 23, 2008.
- HR 9181; Primary Sponsor; resolution entitled "Lung Cancer Awareness Month": The resolution recognized November 2008 as "Lung Cancer Awareness Month" in Florida.

=== 2009 legislative session ===
- HB 53; Primary Sponsor; bill entitled "Clinical Laboratories/Drug Tests/Human Specimens [SPSC]": The bill requires clinical laboratories to accept human specimens submitted by advanced registered nurse practitioners. The bill was passed as SB 408 and signed into law by Florida's Governor on June 10, 2009.
- HB 545; Primary Sponsor; bill entitled "Use of Lights on Motor Vehicles": The bill authorizes vehicles owned, operated, or leased by any county correctional agency to show or display blue lights when responding to emergencies. The bill was passed as SB 1030 and signed into law by Florida's Governor on June 24, 2009.
- HR 9079; Primary Sponsor; resolution entitled "Fair Housing Month": The resolution recognized April 2009 as "Fair Housing Month."

=== 2010 legislative session ===
- HB 765; Primary Sponsor; bill entitled "Ivonne Rodriguez and Victoria McCullough Horse Protection Act": In 2009, there was a substantial increase in the unlawful slaughter of horses in Florida, particularly in Miami-Dade County. Many horses were being slaughtered in connection with the illegal sale of horse meat. The bill increases the criminal penalty for the illegal slaughter of horses to a third-degree felony. It also imposes a mandatory minimum fine of $3,500 and a minimum period of incarceration of one year for the killing of a horse in violation of this statute. The law also expands the scope of the statute to include any person who knowingly transports, distributes, sells, purchases or possesses horse meat that is not clearly stamped, marked and described as horse meat for human consumption or horse meat that has not been acquired from a legally licensed slaughterhouse. Additionally, local governments are now authorized to revoke or suspend local business licenses of restaurants, stores or other businesses after being convicted of violating this statute. The bill also expands the scope of the statute to include all horses, not just recognized breeds and hybrids. The bill was signed into law by Florida's Governor on May 17, 2010. ArticleArticleArticle
- HB 813; Primary Sponsor; bill entitled "Juvenile Justice Facilities and Programs": The bill defines term "ordinary medical care"; requires that DJJ adopt rules to ensure effective delivery of services to youth in facilities or programs operated or contracted by it; requires DJJ to coordinate its rule-adoption process with DCFS & APD to ensure that its rules do not encroach upon substantive jurisdiction of those agencies. The bill was passed as SB 1012 and signed into law on May 28, 2010. Article
- HR 9125; Primary Sponsor; resolution entitled "Miami-Dade County Days": The resolution designated April 21–22, 2010, as "Miami-Dade County Days" at Capitol.

=== 2011 Legislative Session ===
- HB 4075;Primary Sponsor; bill entitled "Saving Dogs": The bill deletes language that includes any dog used primarily or in part for purpose of dog fighting or any dog trained for dog fighting within definition of "dangerous dog" for purposes of provisions regulating dangerous dogs. The bill was signed into law by Florida's Governor on June 21, 2011. The bill was passed with overwhelming support both in the State House and State Senate; the bill received bipartisan support from both Republican and Democratic Parties.

== Sources ==
- Florida House of Representatives Profile
- Project VoteSmart
