= Eileen Higgins =

American politician (born 1964)

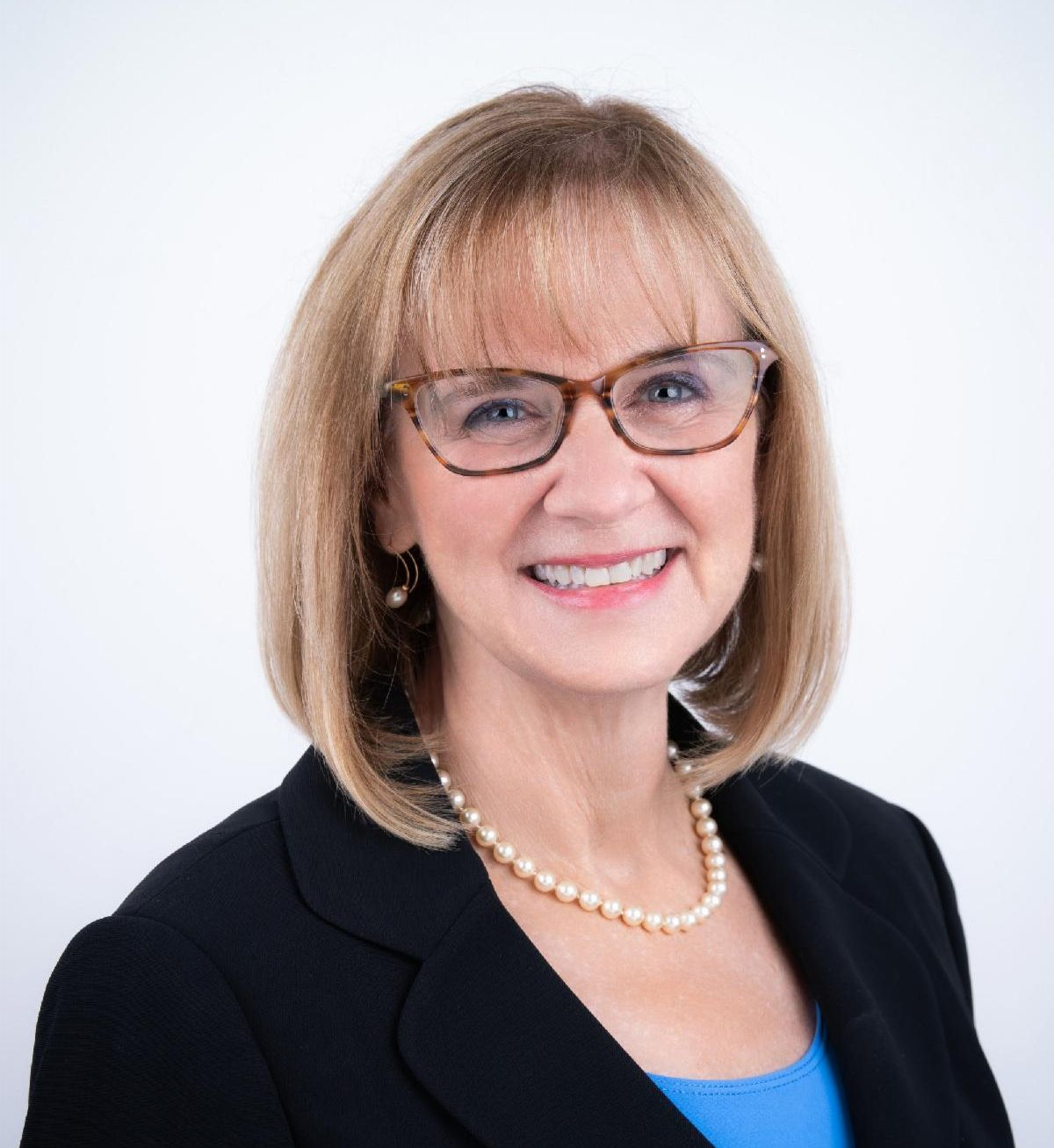
- Official portrait, c. 2020s

44th Mayor of Miami
- Incumbent
- Assumed office December 18, 2025
- Preceded by: Francis Suarez

Member of the Miami-Dade County Commission from the 5th district
- In office June 2, 2018 – November 5, 2025
- Preceded by: Bruno Barreiro
- Succeeded by: Vicki Lopez

Personal details
- Born: June 30, 1964 (age 62) Dayton, Ohio, U.S.
- Party: Democratic
- Education: University of New Mexico (BS); Cornell University (MBA)
- Website: Official website

Eileen Higgins (born June 30, 1964) is an American politician and former diplomat who is currently serving as the 44th mayor of Miami since 2025. A member of the Democratic Party, she previously served as a member of the Miami-Dade County Commission from 2018 to 2025.

In the 2025 Miami mayoral election, Higgins defeated Emilio Gonzalez in a runoff. She is the first woman mayor, the first non-Hispanic mayor since 1996, and the first member of the Florida Democratic Party to be elected mayor since 1997. (Note: The Mayor of Miami is officially elected in a non-partisan election.)

== Early life, education, and career ==
Higgins was born in Dayton, Ohio and raised in Albuquerque, New Mexico. She earned her Bachelor of Science degree in mechanical engineering from the University of New Mexico and a Master of Business Administration from Cornell University.

Higgins moved to Miami in the early 2000s, where she became active in local community and advocacy groups.

Before entering electoral politics, Higgins worked in international development and consulting with a focus on transportation and infrastructure projects in Latin America. In 2006, she became Country Director of the Peace Corps in Belize. After holding this position, Higgins became a foreign service officer for the U.S. Department of State. As a foreign service officer, her work was focused on matters in Mexico as well as in economic development areas of South Africa. After returning to the United States following her work abroad, Higgins worked in private sector marketing, working for such brands as Pfizer and Jose Cuervo.

== Miami–Dade County Commission (2018–2025) ==
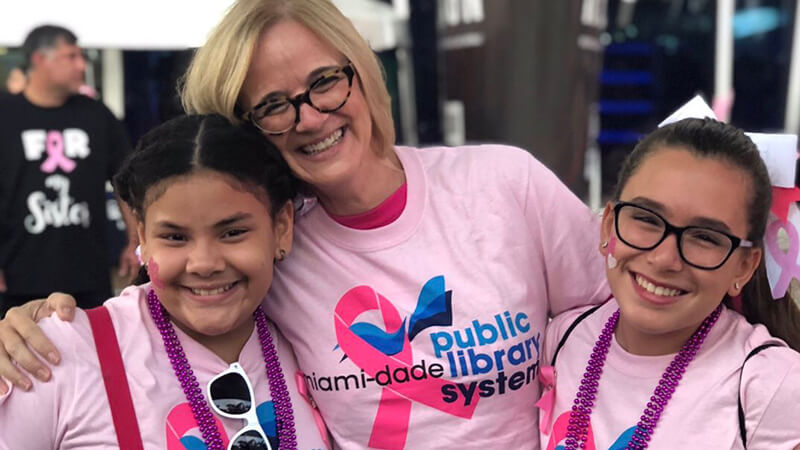
Higgins posing for a group portrait at a Miami–Dade Public Library System event

Higgins was first elected to the Miami-Dade County Commission in June 2018 during a special election to fill the seat vacated by Bruno Barreiro. She won re-election in 2022, and was re-elected again in 2024 without opposition.

As commissioner, Higgins has championed affordable housing, environmental sustainability, and transit expansion, including the implementation of the "Better Bus Network" and the expansion of the Metrorail and trolley systems.

In May 2022, Higgins announced her candidacy for Florida's 27th congressional district. However, she ended her candidacy days later citing her desire to avoid an "unnecessary" Democratic primary between Annette Taddeo and herself.

Among other achievements, in October 2025, Higgins presented the commission's funding for the Bay of Pigs Brigade 2506 Museum and Library in Little Havana.

Higgins's 2025 mayoral campaign necessitated her resignation in November due to the resign to run law in Florida. After filing by petition to run for the office in August 2025, Higgins also tendered a resignation from the commission that would take effect on November 5, 2025. At the time of her departure, she was the commission's longest-serving member, having served for more than six years.

== Mayor of Miami (2025–present) ==
=== 2025 campaign ===
In early 2025, Higgins announced her campaign for Mayor of Miami, seeking to succeed incumbent Francis X. Suarez, who was term-limited. A poll conducted between July 27 and August 1, 2025, showed Higgins with 74% name recognition and a 21-point lead over her closest rival. She was characterized as the main front-runner among candidates affiliated with the Democratic Party, with Ken Russell being the only other Democrat among the candidates characterized as being in a competitive position per polling.

Higgins qualified for the ballot by submitting 3,000 signatures in support of her candidacy on the ballot, as opposed to the alternate option of qualifying for the ballot by paying a fee. She touted the collection of signatures as a demonstration of her candidacy enjoying both sizable and organized support.

Higgins's campaign emphasized a number of key issues, including government transparency, government efficiency, housing affordability and other resident affordability concerns, climate resilience, efficiency and interconnected public transportation services, advocacy for the city's police and first responders, and the reform of permitting processes. She received endorsements from several local labor and environmental groups.

Before the first round of voting, Higgins was considered one of the leading candidates in the election. Higgins had a strong lead in the first round, but failed to reach a majority of the vote. She faced Emilio T. Gonzalez on December 9, 2025, and won the election with 59.3% of the vote. She is the first female mayor of Miami. She is also the first Democratic as well as non-Hispanic mayor since the 1990s.

== See also ==
- List of mayors of Miami
- Government of Miami

== Notes ==
Political offices
Preceded by Francis Suarez	Mayor of Miami; 2025–present	Incumbent
