= Florida's 118th House of Representatives district =

American legislative district

Florida's 118th State House of Representatives district
Representative
Mike Redondo; R–Miami
- Registration: 52.3% Republican; 46.5% Democratic; 1.3% No party preference
- Demographics: 7.7% White; 5.6% Black; 85.7% Hispanic; 2.2% Asian; 0.6% Native American; 0.1% Hawaiian/Pacific Islander
- Population (2022) • Voting age: 183,655; 18

Florida's 118th House of Representatives district elects one member of the Florida House of Representatives. Its current representative is Mike Redondo. The district covers areas west of Kendall and Zoo Miami.

== Members ==
Representative	Party	Years of service	Hometown	Notes
Frank Artiles	Republican	November 2, 2010 – November 8, 2016		Redistricted from State House District 119. Elected State Senator in 2016
Robert Asencio	Democratic	November 8, 2016 – November 6, 2018		Lost to Anthony Rodriguez
Anthony Rodriguez	Republican	November 6, 2018 – November 8, 2022		Elected Miami Dade County Commissioner for District 10 in 2022
Juan Fernandez-Barquin	Republican	November 8, 2022 – June 11, 2023	Kendale Lakes	Elected State Representative for District 119 in 2018. Redistricted into District 118 in 2022. Won landslide victories in Primary and General redistricting elections. Resigned in 2023.
Mike Redondo	Republican	December 5, 2023 - present	Miami	Won in special election with 52% of the votes.
