= Anthony Rodriguez (politician) =

American politician (born 1988)

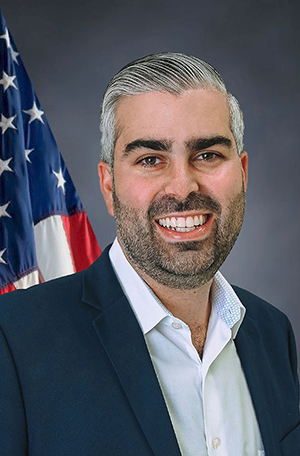

Chairman of the Miami-Dade County Commission
- Incumbent
- Assumed office December 11, 2024
- Preceded by: Oliver Gilbert

Member of the Miami-Dade County Commission from the 10th district
- Incumbent
- Assumed office November 22, 2022
- Preceded by: Javier Souto

Member of the Florida House of Representatives from the 118th district
- In office November 6, 2018 – November 8, 2022
- Preceded by: Robert Asencio
- Succeeded by: Juan Fernandez-Barquin (redistricting)

Personal details
- Born: March 24, 1988 (age 38) Miami, Florida
- Party: Republican
- Spouse: Licette Rodriguez
- Children: 3
- Occupation: Property manager
- Website: anthonyforflorida.com

Anthony Rodriguez is an American politician serving Miami-Dade County since 2018. A member of the Republican party, Rodriguez served as a member of the Florida House of Representatives from 2018 to 2022 and as a Miami-Dade County Commissioner from 2022 to present.

== History ==
Rodriguez was born and raised in Miami, Florida, and attended Miami Sunset Senior High School.

== Florida House of Representatives ==
In 2016, the Representative for Florida House District 118, Frank Artiles, did not run for reelection, opting instead to run for the Florida Senate. In response, Rodriguez and four other Republicans vied for the open seat. Rodriguez lost the primary election to former U.S. Representative David Rivera, with 34% of the vote to Rivera's 36%. Rivera lost the general election to Robert Asencio.

Running again in 2018, Rodriguez was unopposed in the Republican primary. In the general election, Rodriguez won 51.15% of the vote, defeating the incumbent, Democrat Robert Asencio.

== Miami Dade County Commission ==
In June 2021 Rodriguez announced his candidacy to succeed term limited incumbent Javier Souto. Rodriguez faced no serious opposition and winning 56% of the vote in August 2022 wins the seat by default no requiring a second round. In 2026, he was re-elected with no opposition.
