= 1977 Miami mayoral election =

- November 8, 1977
- Turnout: 27.1% (of registered voters)

Candidate	Maurice Ferré	Evaristo Marina	Celeste Coonan
Popular vote	23,237	5,778	3,644
Percentage	67.39%	16.76%	10.57%
Mayor before election
Maurice Ferré
Elected mayor
Maurice Ferré

The 1977 Miami mayoral election was held November 7, 1977. Incumbent mayor Maurice Ferré easily won re-election to a third-consecutive term in a landslide victory over two opponents.

== Candidates ==
- Celeste Coonan, former county employee (Note: Coonan had worked as a county drug counselor, but resigned this position in order to run for mayor)
- Maurice Ferré, incumbent mayor and head of Maule Industries
- Evaristo "Ever" Marina, president of the Inter-American Chamber of Commerce of Greater Miami; former Cuban director of general order for 6 years in the Batisa government

== Campaign ==
The New York Times characterized the race as primarily being between Ferré and Marina, highlighting that this pitted the Puerto Rican Ferré against a challenger that belonged to the city's Cuban immigrant community. The New York Times further highlighted among all candidates for city offices in 1977, 8 of 10 were similarly identified as Latin American; perhaps reflective of the city's by-then influential Latin American population that was expected to provide half of the participating electorate in the municipal elections.

Ferré raised $63,000 for his campaign. Marina raised $17,000; while Coonan raised only $700. The New York Times noted that Coonan's candidacy was widely written off, publishing, "the woman candidate, Celeste Coonan, is not given much of a chance."

Ferré supported a proposal to construct an amusement park on Watson Island, arguing that it would increase the amount of tourism, convention business, and spending in the city. He argued that the opening of Walt Disney World in the state had necessitated that new attractions be built in Miami to keep it compensative as a tourism destination, also citing proposed Knight Center Complex and Miami World Trade Center projects as necessary for the same reason. Ferré also campaigned on supporting improvements to municipal services, including police services. Ferré supported retaining the existing council-manager form of government in the city, arguing that it had worked positively.

Marina described himself as standing for "justice and order", urging for expanded police and fire department. He opposed issuing municipal bonds to fund improvements to the Orange Bowl stadium, instead proposing that the rental fees charged by the venue be increased to fund such improvements. He also opposed the proposal to build an amusement park on Watson Island, describing the island as already being "a nice place" and considering the project too risky.

Coonan argued in favor of transition to a strong mayor system of government, describing the mayor under the council-manager form of government as "just a puppet". She also argued that the city needed to take more of a lead in major projects, rather than ceding leadership to the county government. Coonan opposed a proposal to demolish residences near the Orange Bowl to construct parking lots, instead arguing that a tall parking structure should be constructed near the stadium to minimize necessitated land acquisition. Coonan also supported increasing the number of police in the city. Coonan alleged that Ferré's own company's business struggles had harmed the city's image, which Ferré characterized as an "absurd" charge.

== Results ==
Results
Candidate	Votes	%
Maurice Ferré (incumbent)	23,237	67.39
E. L. Marina	5,778	16.76
Celeste Coonan	3,644	10.57
Total votes	34,483	100

== Aftermath ==
Ferré would be re-elected thrice more (in 1979, 1981 and 1983), before losing re-election in 1985. After 1985, he would unsuccessfully try to return to the mayoralty, running in 1987 and 2001.

Marina unsuccessfully ran for mayor again in 2005.
