= 1985 Miami mayoral election =

- November 5, 1985 (first round); November 12, 1985 (runoff)
- Turnout: 47.98% (first round) (Note: first round participation among registered voters); 48.13% (runoff) (Note: runoff participation among registered voters)

Candidate	Xavier Suarez	Raul Masvidal	Maurice Ferré
First round	16,012; 29.23%	14,412; 26.31%	14,613; 26.68%
Runoff	31,217; 56.84%	23,704; 43.16%	eliminated
Candidate	Marvin Dunn
First round	7,041; 12.85%
Runoff	eliminated
Mayor before election
Maurice Ferré
Elected mayor
Xavier Suarez

The 1985 Miami mayoral election consisted of an initial vote held on November 5, 1985, and a runoff vote held on November 12. It resulted in the election of attorney Xavier Suarez. The incumbent mayor, Maurice Ferré, was seeking an unprecedented seventh term as mayor. However, Ferré was eliminated in the first round.

Both candidates to advance to the general election (Suarez and businessman Raul Masvidal) were Cuban-born. Suarez's election made him the first Cuban-born mayor of Miami.

== Candidates ==
=== Advanced to runoff ===
- Raul Masvidal, self-made millionaire banker, member of the "Non-Group", former member of the Florida Board of Regents, former chairman of the Miami-Dade-Broward South Florida Sports Authority, co-founder of the Cuban American National Foundation and one-time Bay of Pigs Invasion anti-Fidel Castro combatant,
- Xavier Suarez, attorney and runner-up in the 1983 mayoral election

=== Eliminated in first round ===
- Pedro Arriaga
- Manuel Benitez
- Frederick Bryant
- Evelio Estrella
- Maurice Ferré, incumbent mayor
- Marvin Dunn, college professor
- Harvey R. McArthur, Socialist Workers Party-affiliated perennial candidate (Note: 1984 Socialist Workers Party nominee for Florida's 19th congressional district; 1973 Socialist Workers Party nominee for Philadelphia City Commission; 1972 Socialist Workers Party nominee for Treasurer of Pennsylvania)
- Otis W. Shiver, former city commissioner
- Wellington Rolle

== Campaign ==
The election was acrimonious and attracted national attention. Campaign spending totaled at approximately $1.9 million.

=== Background ===
Incumbent mayor Ferré was seeking an unprecedented seventh term. In the 1981 and 1983 elections, in order to combat votes against him from the city's Cuban American population, he had relied on the support of a coalition of American-born white voters, Puerto Rican voters, and African American voters. Ferré had enjoyed strong African American support in all of his prior mayoral elections. However, his firing of Howard Gary (who was African American) from his position as city manager had caused African American support for him to fracture prior to the 1985 election. Anger over Gary's firing was seen as a major factor in Ferré's ultimate first round defeat in the election.

In his previous election, Ferré won a runoff against Suarez, who challenged him again in 1985. Nine other candidates also ran in 1985. Of the cumulative eleven candidates, only four (Ferré, Saurez, Masvidal, and Dunn) were perceived as being viable contenders.

=== First round campaign ===
The Orlando Sentinel described Dunn as running a "creditable" campaign on a sparse budget. It described Ferré, Suarez, Masdival, and Dunn as the candidates that were in a viable position to advance to a runoff, and described the other seven candidates as having "little chance".

Ahead of the first round, the editorial boards of the city's two major daily newspapers (the Miami Herald and The Miami News) published endorsements of Masvidal. The Miami Herald's endorsement was critical of the prospect of a seventh term for Ferré,

It is time for a change, a profound change that can come only by ousting Maurice Ferre. The sad fact is that Maurice Ferre has become not one man but two. One is a charming, persuasive, urbane, occasionally visionary believer in and evangelist for Miami’s potential. For all that this Maurice Ferre has achieved as mayor, grant him due credit. The other Maurice Ferre is venal, vindictive, obsessed with remaining in office at all costs. It is this persona, alas, that seeks a seventh term.

The majority of discourse ahead of the first round of the election focused on Ferré and his actions as mayor. Masvidal's of Ferré were very acrimonious. Suarez also largely focused his campaigning on attacking the incumbent mayor. However, in late October Suarez began additionally criticizing Masvidal. Suarez prefaced some criticism of Masvidal with the note that he still regarded Masvidal to be a friend of his.

During the campaign, Suarez was perceived as holding an adversarial attitude towards the downtown business establishment.

=== Runoff campaign ===
African American voters were particularly courted by both Suarez and Masvidal ahead of the runoff. Suarez had received very little support from African American voters in the first round while Masvidal had received a sizable share of the black vote in the first round. Suarez received endorsements from a number of important black allies of Ferré, but they were not seen as having anywhere near the influence that Gary (who had endorsed Masvidal) had with the city's black electorate.

Masvidal retained the endorsements of both daily newspapers.

== First round results ==
The city's November 5 elections saw 56,830 ballots cast (49.78% turnout among the city's 114,173 registered voters). Of these, 2,383 ballots were either blank or otherwise undervoted by casting no vote in the mayoral race. The mayoral election saw participation by 47.98% of the city's registered voters. Turnout was much lower than had been anticipated. Weather on the day of the election was described as "sunny", and was not considered a factor in the turnout failing to meet expectations.

Since no candidate received a majority, a runoff needed to be held. Ferré was unseated, placing third and thereby failing to make the runoff. Of the nine City of Miami mayoral elections Ferré ran in during his lifetime, 1985 was the only one in which he failed to either win or advance to a runoff. (Note: Ferré won six earlier elections (1973, 1975, 1977, 1979, 1981, and 1983), and advanced to runoffs in two subsequent unsuccessful candidacies (1987 and 2001))

First round results
Candidate	Votes	%
Xavier Suarez	16,012	29.3
Raul Masvidal	14,412	28.1
Maurice Ferré (incumbent)	14,613	26.7
Marvin Dunn	7,041	12.8
Manuel Benitez	620	1.1
Otis W. Shiver	355	0.6
Harvey R. McArthur	186	0.3
Frederick Bryant	196	0.4
Wellington Rolle	118	0.2
Pedro Arriaga	114	0.2
Evelio Estrella	114	0.2
Total votes	54,781	100

=== Analysis of first round results ===
Both candidates that advanced to the runoff (Suarez and Masvidal) were Cuban-Americans. Pollsters considered it widely surprising that two Cuban-American candidates had advanced, and that the incumbent mayor had failed to advance.

Ferré received only an estimated 10–15% of the city's black vote. Dunn (who was himself African American) and Masvidal (endorsed by Gary) received equally large shares of the black vote by some estimates. The Miami Herald estimated that Masvidal greatly outperformed even Dunn among black voters. Suarez, who had been born in Cuba, received a massive share of the Cuban-American vote. Masdival was also born in Cuba, received less strong support from Cuban-American voters, underperforming both Suarez and Ferré in Little Havana. Overall, Suarez performed strongly with hispanic voters in the city, but received weak support from black and American-born white voters. Ferré received an estimated 35% of the combined vote of non-Latin white and black voters. Suarez received very little support from African American voters (receiving approximately 2% of the black vote). Suarez also received immensely weak support in several communities with large anglo-white populations, such as Coconut Grove.

The Miami Herald published and estimate of the vote that each candidate received among major ethnic blocs in the city (basing their estimations for each bloc on a sample of returns in nine precincts heavily populated by voters of the relevant ethnicities).

Miami Herald estimated share of votes for candidates among ethnic blocs
Candidate	Black voters	Hispanic voters	Non-latin whites
Suarez	2%	48%	13%
Masvidal	52%	21%	34%
Ferré	10%	21%	34%
Dunn	32%	1%	26%

== Runoff results ==
56,225 of the city's 114,121 registered voters cast ballots in the November 12 runoffs (49.27% turnout). 1,304 ballots were either blank or undervoted in the mayoral race. 48.13% of registered voters cast a vote in the mayoral race.

First round results
Candidate	Votes	%
Xavier Suarez	31,217	56.84
Raul Masvidal	23,704	43.16
Total votes	54,921	100

=== Analysis of runoff results ===
In the runoff, Masvidal retained his strength among black voters. However, Suarez outperformed expectations for his support among non-hispanic white voters. Additionally, Suarez outperformed Masvidal by margins as high as 7–1 in areas of Little Havana with a high Cuban-American population. Suarez won the election, a victory which resulted in him becoming the first Cuban-born mayor of Miami.
