= Bruno Barreiro =

American politician

Bruno A. Barreiro
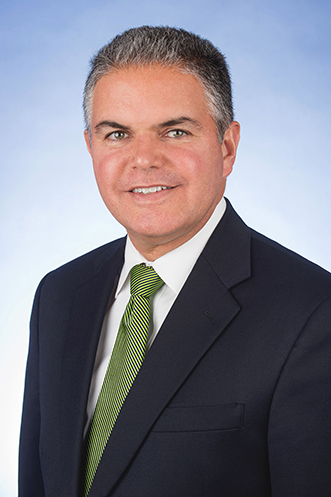

Member of the Miami-Dade County Commission from the 5th district
- In office June 2, 1998 – March 31, 2018
- Preceded by: Bruce Kaplan
- Succeeded by: Eileen Higgins

Member of the Florida House of Representatives from the 107th district
- In office November 3, 1992 – June 2, 1998
- Preceded by: Redistricted
- Succeeded by: Gustavo Barreiro

Personal details
- Born: December 14, 1965 (age 60) Clearwater, Florida, U.S.
- Party: Republican
- Spouse: Zoraida A Barreiro
- Education: University of Miami
- Occupation: Business owner
- Website: www.BarreiroFL.com

Bruno Arthur Barreiro (born December 14, 1965) is a Republican politician from Florida. He served on the Miami-Dade County Commission from 1998 to 2018, representing part of Miami Beach and the Miami neighborhoods of Brickell, Little Havana, Coral Way, and West Flagler. He resigned on March 31, 2018, to run unsuccessfully in the Republican primary for Florida's 27th congressional district in the 2018 election.

== Early life and education ==
Barreiro is the son of Cuban immigrant parents and was born in Clearwater, Florida. He graduated from Christopher Columbus High School and attended the University of Miami in Coral Gables, Florida.

== Political career ==
=== Florida House of Representatives ===
Barreiro was first elected into public office in 1992 to serve in the Florida House of Representatives representing District 107. While serving in the Florida House of Representatives, he chaired the Tourism Committee. He also got the nickname "el mudo" (the mute).

=== Miami-Dade County Commission ===
Barreiro (furthest right) joins other elected officials on a boat tour of the Miami River in March 1999; L–R: U.S. Rep. Lincoln Diaz-Balart; Miami-Dade Mayor Alex Penelas; U.S. Rep. Ileana Ros-Lehtinen; Miami Mayor Joe Carollo, Barreiro

On June 2, 1998, Barreiro was elected to serve as Miami-Dade County Commissioner representing District 5. He served as Chairman of the Board of County Commissioners in 2007 and 2008. He was re-elected for subsequent terms to represent constituents in portions of the Cities of Miami and Miami Beach, as well as the communities of Little Havana, Downtown, and South Beach.

Barreiro was a key figure behind the Marlins Park baseball stadium in Miami, which attracted controversy due to its enormous cost to Miami-Dade County and benefit to Marlins owner Jeffrey Loria.

Barreiro voted in 2012 to award a $25 Million contract to Munilla Construction Management (MCM) for a testing track for Metrorail cars after receiving maximum donations from 4 Munilla family members, renting subsidized office space from the family, and acknowledging he was "close friends" with the family members. As of November 30, 2015, $21 Million of the $25 Million contract had been paid and construction was never completed.

In 2018, the Miami Herald described Barreiro as "a powerful figure in Miami politics."

=== 2018 U.S. House campaign ===
In May 2017, Barreiro announced he would run for Florida's 27th congressional district in the 2018 election, after incumbent Congresswoman Ileana Ros-Lehtinen announced she was retiring.

On March 31, 2018, Barreiro resigned his County Commission seat to run for Congress, following a change in Florida's resign-to-run law. He timed his resignation so that a special election would be called, in which his wife Zoraida could win his seat. He used over $95,000 of his own campaign funds to support Zoraida, but she lost the June special election to Democratic candidate Eileen Higgins.

Barreiro's support of his wife's campaign weakened his ability to campaign against his eight challengers for the Republican House nomination, of whom the strongest was TV journalist Maria Elvira Salazar. Salazar ultimately won the August primary election with 40.5% of the vote, with Barreiro coming in second place with 25.7%.

=== 2020 Florida House of Representatives ===
Barreiro ran for District 112 in the 2020 Florida House of Representatives election, challenging incumbent Nick Duran. Duran defeated Barreiro 53%-47%.

=== 2021 Miami City Commission ===
On June 4, 2021, Barreiro filed paperwork to challenge Joe Carollo for city commission district 3. He withdrew from the race on July 21.

== Electoral history ==
1996 General Election for Florida's 107th House of Representatives District
Party	Candidate	Votes	%
Republican	Bruno Barreiro (Incumbent)	13,689	57.56
Democratic	Marc Anthony Lemonis	10,092	42.44
Total votes		23,781	100

1994 General Election for Florida's 107th House of Representatives District
Party	Candidate	Votes	%
Republican	Bruno Barreiro (Incumbent)	10,681	53.87
Democratic	Andres Rivero	9,146	46.13
Total votes		19,827	100

1992 General Election for Florida's 107th House of Representatives District
Party	Candidate	Votes	%
Republican	Bruno Barreiro	13,567	50.89
Democratic	Steve Leifman	13,091	49.11
Total votes		26,658	100

== Personal life ==
He and his wife Zoraida are parents of two children, Bianca Fatima and Bruno Antonio.

Barreiro is the owner of BABJ Investment Corporation, Marketing Vice President of Fatima Home Care and a Director of IUSA Partners, Inc.

Florida House of Representatives
Preceded by James Burke	Member of the Florida House of Representatives from the 107th district 1992–1998	Succeeded by Gustavo Barreiro
Political offices
Preceded by Bruce Kaplan	Member of the Miami-Dade County Commission from the 5th district 1998–2018	Succeeded by Eileen Higgins
