= Emilio T. Gonzalez =

Cuban-American politician (born 1956)

Emilio González
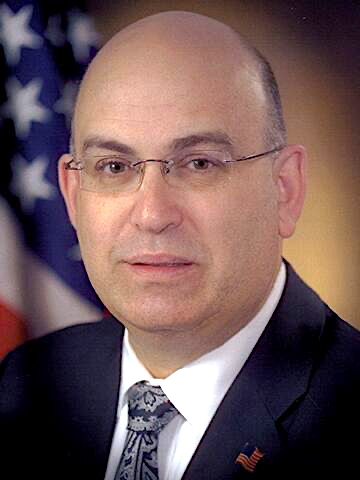

City Manager of Miami
- In office January 11, 2018 – February 24, 2020
- Preceded by: Daniel J. Alfonso
- Succeeded by: Arthur Noriega

Director of United States Citizenship and Immigration Services
- In office December 21, 2005 – April 18, 2008
- President: George W. Bush
- Preceded by: Eduardo Aguirre
- Succeeded by: Alejandro Mayorkas

Personal details
- Born: Emilio Tomás González; December 21, 1956 (age 69) Havana, Cuba
- Party: Republican
- Education: University of South Florida, Tampa (BA); Tulane University (MA); Naval War College (MS); University of Miami (PhD)

Military service
- Allegiance: United States
- Branch/service: United States Army
- Rank: Colonel

Emilio Tomás González (born December 21, 1956) is a partner and senior advisor to the Executive Committee at Ducenta Squared Asset Management. He was also a Republican candidate in the 2025 Miami mayoral election.

Prior to this, González was City Manager and Chief Administrative Officer of the City of Miami. He was appointed by Mayor Francis Suarez in December 2017 and confirmed by the Miami City Commission in January 2018. He stayed in that position until February 2020.

González previously was Aviation Director and CEO of Miami International Airport and the Miami Dade County Aviation Department from April 2013 to December 2017.

González has held private sector executive positions and was Director of the U.S. Citizenship and Immigration Services (USCIS), an Under Secretary position within the Department of Homeland Security. Appointed by President George W. Bush and confirmed by the United States Senate in December 2005, he led an organization of more than 17,000 federal and contract employees responsible for the processing of immigration benefits. González announced his resignation in March 2008, and it became effective in April of that year.

González also was Director of Western Hemisphere Affairs at the National Security Council. In this capacity, he was a national security and foreign policy advisor to President Bush and Condoleezza Rice.

== Background ==
González was born in Havana, Cuba, and raised in Tampa, Florida. He joined the Miami, Florida-based international law firm of Tew Cardenas as Senior Managing Director for Global and Government Affairs after leaving government service.

González completed a career in the United States Army that spanned 26 years. He worked with the Defense Intelligence Agency as a military attaché to U.S. Embassies in El Salvador and Mexico, taught at the United States Military Academy at West Point, and headed the Office of Special Assistants for the Commander-in-Chief of the United States Southern Command. During his military career, González earned U.S. military decorations such as the Parachutist Badge and the Presidential Staff Badge. González has also been decorated by the Governments of Spain, Mexico, Guatemala, Honduras, El Salvador, Nicaragua, Panama, the Dominican Republic and Colombia. He retired from active duty with the rank of colonel.

A graduate of the University of South Florida in Tampa with a B.A. in international studies, González also earned M.A. degrees in Latin American studies from Tulane University, and in Strategic Studies and National Security Affairs from the U.S. Naval War College. He received a Ph.D. in international relations from the Graduate School of International Studies, University of Miami, where he also received the Graduate School Award for Academic Achievement.

== 2025 Miami mayoral election ==
In April 2025, González filed to run for mayor of Miami, saying that people in the city should "stop voting for the clowns." He was endorsed by the Miami Young Republicans in August 2025 and Florida Governor Ron DeSantis in September 2025. DeSantis said that González was "committed to providing property tax relief, strengthening public safety, and reducing government red tape." González was also endorsed by Sen. Rick Scott in October 2025. In November 2025, President Donald Trump gave Gonzalez his "complete and total endorsement."

On November 4, 2025, the Miami mayoral race went to a runoff election between González and Miami-Dade County Commissioner Eileen Higgins, a Democrat. On December 9, 2025, he lost the election to Eileen Higgins.
