= 2005 Miami mayoral election =

- November 15, 2005

Candidate	Manny Diaz	Enrique Santos
Popular vote	17,037	6,828
Percentage	65.25%	26.15%
Mayor before election
Manny Diaz
Nonpartisan
Elected Mayor
Manny Diaz
Nonpartisan

The 2005 Miami mayoral election took place on November 15, 2005. Incumbent Mayor Manny Diaz ran for re-election to a second term. He faced four little-known challengers, the most prominent of whom was radio talk show host Enrique Santos. Diaz ultimately won re-election by a wide margin, receiving 65 percent of the vote to Santos's 26 percent.

== Primary election ==
=== Candidates ===
- Manny Diaz, incumbent Mayor
- Enrique Santos, radio host, former North Miami police officer
- Charles Cutler, Vietnam War veteran, former member of Miami Equal Opportunity Advisory Board
- Evaristo "Ever" Marina, editor of El Nuevo Herald 1977 mayoral candidate, and former Cuban director of general order for 6 years in the Batisa government
- Omari Musa, meatpacker, socialist activist

=== Results ===
2005 Miami mayoral election results
Party	Candidate	Votes	%
Nonpartisan	Manny Diaz (incumbent)	17,037	65.25
Nonpartisan	Enrique Santos	6,828	26.15
Nonpartisan	Charles Cutler	1,386	5.31
Nonpartisan	Evaristo "Ever" Marina	668	2.56
Nonpartisan	Omari Musa	190	0.73
Total votes		26,109	100
