= Dariel Fernandez =

Cuban-American businessman, civil servant and politician

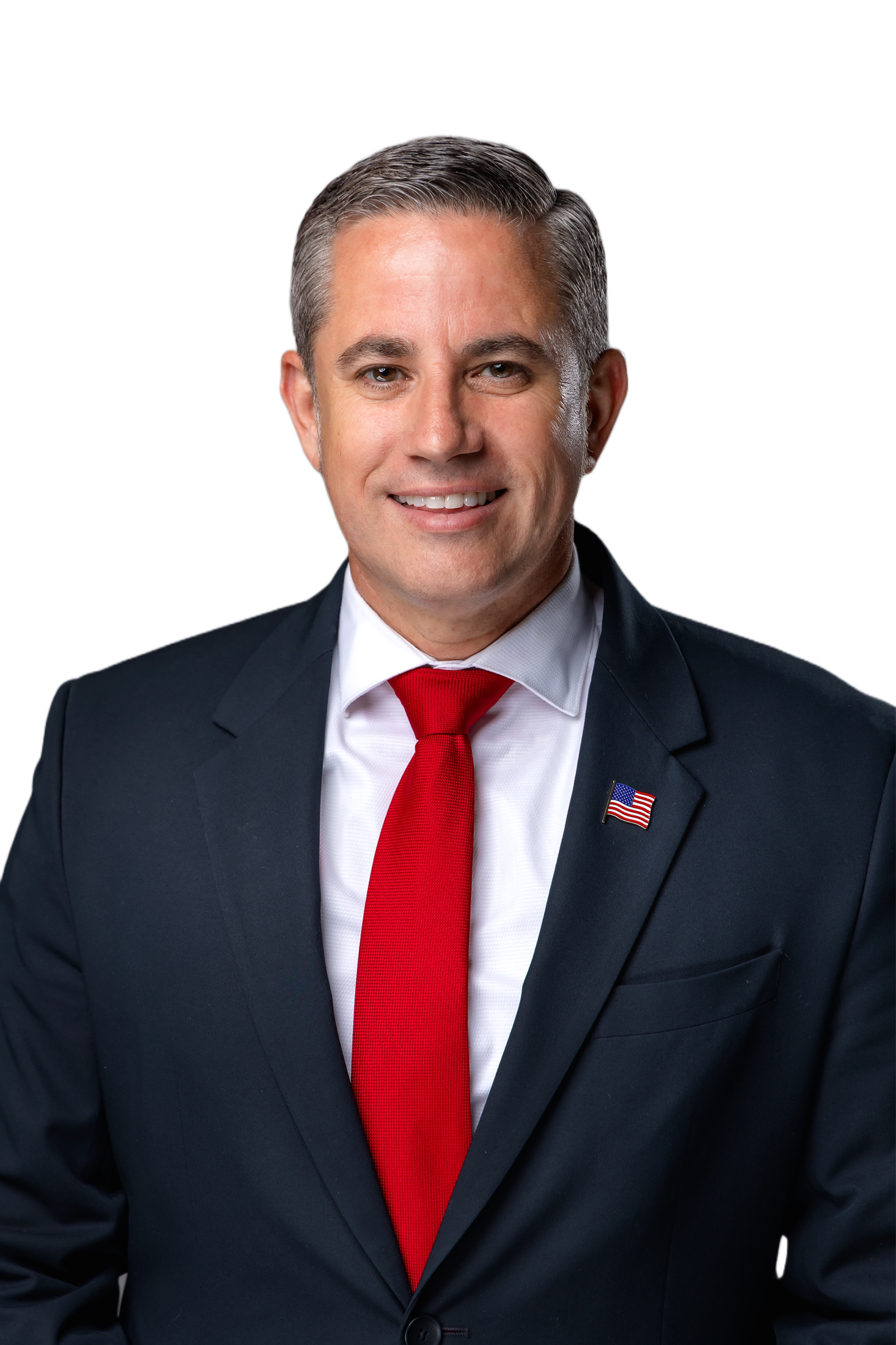
- Official Portrait, 2025

1st Miami-Dade County Tax Collector
- Incumbent
- Assumed office January 7, 2025
- Preceded by: Position established

Personal details
- Born: Havana, Cuba
- Party: Republican
- Spouse: Carolina Vester
- Children: 2
- Education: Miami Dade College
- Occupation: Businessman • politician
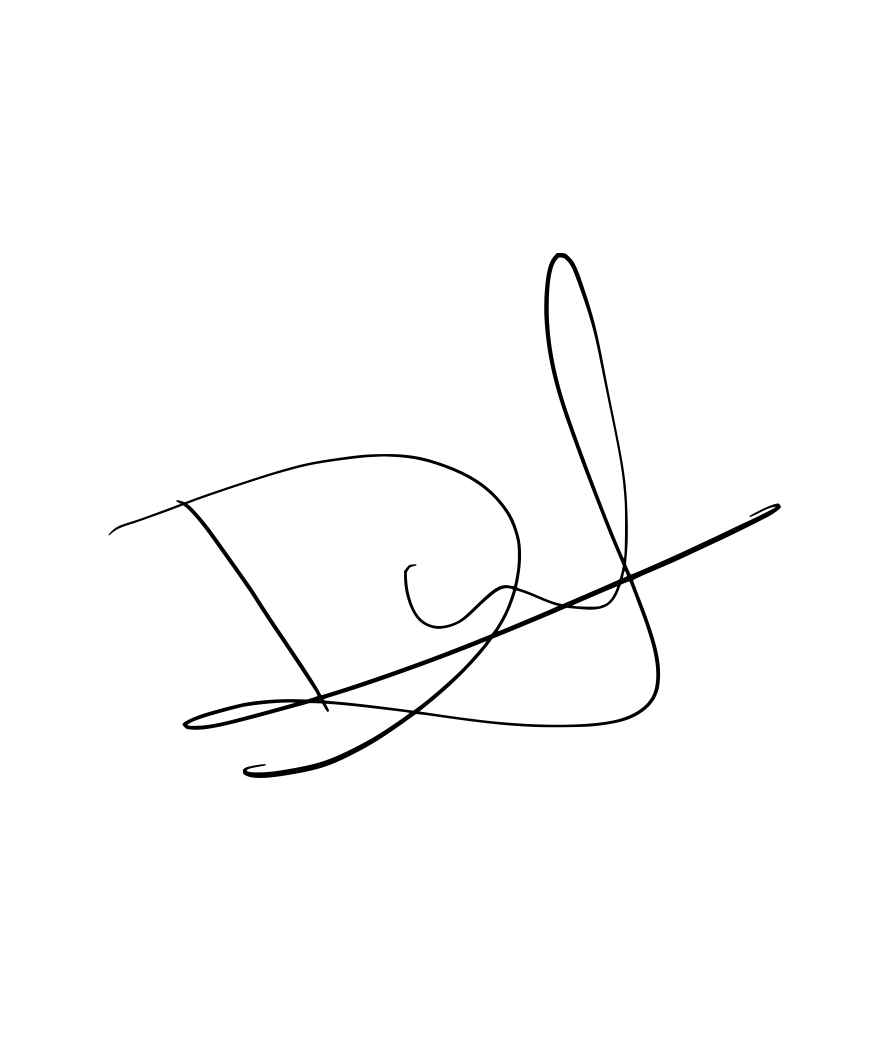
- Signature
- Website: mdctaxcollector.gov

Dariel Fernandez is a Cuban American businessman, civil servant, and politician who has served as the Miami-Dade County Tax Collector since 2025, becoming the first elected official in that role. A member of the Republican Party, he previously served on the Miami-Dade County Community Council from 2021 to 2024.

== Early life and career ==
Fernandez was born in Güines, Cuba, and grew up in Madruga. He later immigrated to the United States and studied at Miami Dade College.

Fernandez began his career in public engagement in 2004 at Radio Paz 830AM, where he discussed local and regional issues. Fernandez served on the Miami-Dade County Community Council and participated in zoning and land use decisions. He was also President of the international movement "Somos Mas" and served on the Miami-Dade Cryptocurrency Task Force.

He is the founder of Ponemus Group, a marketing and software development company based in Miami.

== Miami-Dade County Tax Collector ==
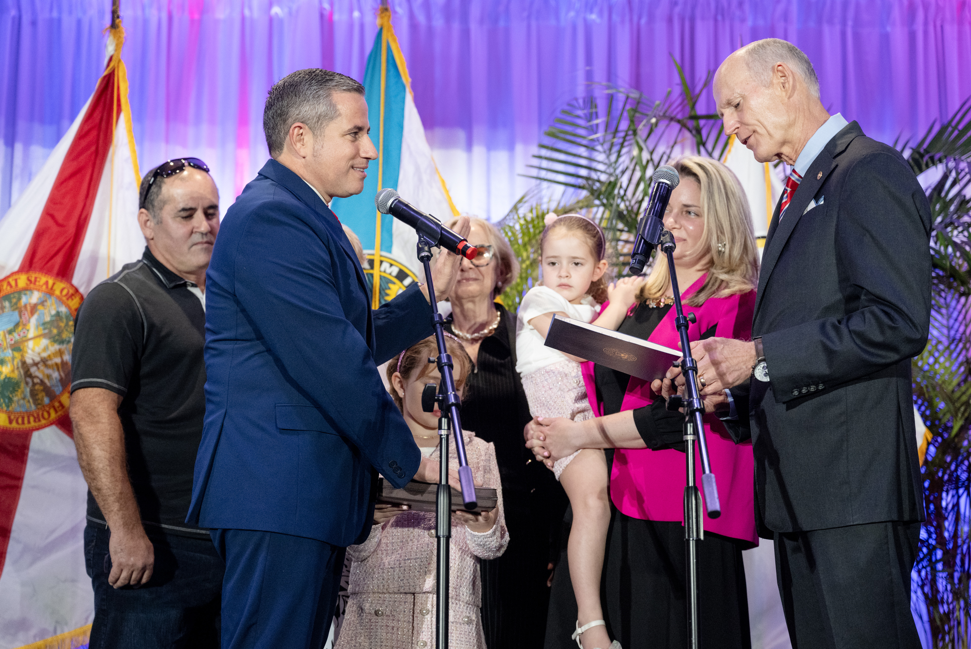
Fernandez as Tax Collector, 2025

Following the 2018 passage of a Florida constitutional amendment, the role of Miami-Dade Tax Collector transitioned from an appointed to an elected position.

On April 5, 2024, Fernandez announced his candidacy for the office of the tax collector of Miami-Dade County. He won the Republican primary against Bryan Calvo and later defeated Democratic candidate David Richardson in the general election with 55.7% of the vote.

His campaign emphasized government modernization, operational efficiency, and addressing corruption in local services. He was endorsed by public figures including Mayor Esteban Bovo, Francis Suarez, Kevin Marino Cabrera, and Rick Scott.

On March 17, 2025, Fernandez announced an investigation into DMV appointment scalping in coordination with local law enforcement. The probe aimed to crack down on fraudulent resale of driver license appointments. The investigation received national attention and led to a proposed ordinance by Commissioner Kevin Marino Cabrera to criminalize appointment scalping.

Additionally, as part of his effort to improve service accessibility, Fernandez announced a partnership with Publix supermarkets to install kiosks across multiple locations. These kiosks allow residents to renew their vehicle registrations and license plates conveniently, bringing government services closer to the community.

== Personal life ==
Fernandez is a practicing Roman Catholic and has spoken publicly about the importance of his faith in guiding his values and approach to public service. He is married to Carolina Vester, a public administrator who serves as Assistant City manager for the City of Coral Gables.

== Electoral history ==
General election for Miami-Dade County Tax Collector, 2024
| Party | Candidate | Votes | % |
|---|---|---|---|
| Republican | Dariel Fernandez | 576,601 | 55.7 |
| Democratic | David Richardson | 459,445 | 44.3 |
| Total votes | | 1,036,046 | 100.00 |

Republican primary for Miami-Dade County Tax Collector, 2024
| Party | Candidate | Votes | % |
|---|---|---|---|
| Republican | Dariel Fernandez | 54,467 | 51.7 |
| Republican | Bryan Calvo | 50,844 | 48.3 |
| Total votes | | 105,311 | 100.00 |
