= Gustavo Barreiro =

American politician (1959–2019)

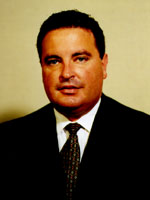

Member of the Florida House of Representatives from the 107th district
- In office November 3, 1998 – November 7, 2006
- Preceded by: Bruno Barreiro
- Succeeded by: Luis Garcia

Personal details
- Born: July 12, 1959 Matanzas, Cuba
- Died: August 16, 2019 (aged 60) Miami, Florida, U.S.
- Party: Republican
- Relations: Bruno Barreiro (half-brother)
- Education: Mount Senario College (BS)
- Occupation: Consultant

Gustavo "Gus" Alberto Barreiro (July 12, 1959 – August 16, 2019) was a Republican politician from Florida. He served four terms in the Florida House of Representatives, representing the 107th district in Miami-Dade County from 1998 to 2006. His district encompassed parts of Miami, Miami Beach, and Coral Gables.

In 2012, Barreiro ran for the Florida House again, but lost the Republican primary in the 112th district to Alex Díaz de la Portilla, 59 to 41%. He died after a heart attack in 2019.

== Controversy ==
Barreiro was terminated from his position as director of residential facilities for the Florida Department of Juvenile Justice in 2009 after an investigation revealed that he had downloaded 300 to 400 sexually explicit adult porn images onto his state-issued laptop. He also used his computer to log on to the sex hookup site adultfriendfinders.com using the screen name "CubanCigar107." Barreiro claimed he was set up.

== Councils/Committee Membership ==
- Criminal Justice Appropriations Committee, Chair
- Community Colleges & Workforce Committee
- Fiscal Council
- Juvenile Justice Committee
- Legislative Budget Commission
- Utilities & Telecommunications Committee

== Legislative Service ==
Elected to the House in 1998, reelected subsequently.

- Served in The Florida House of Representatives 1998-2006
- Chaired the committee on Juvenile Justice
- Chaired the committee on Crime and punishment
- Chaired the committee on Criminal Justice Appropriations
- Chaired the select committee on the death of Omar Paisley
- Chaired the select committee on the death of Martin Lee Anderson at a Florida Boot Camp

== Affiliations ==
- The Children's Trust
- Dade Marine Institute executive director
- Republican Party of Florida
- Defiant Crew Motorcycle Club Vice President
- Civil Air Patrol
- Guardian Ad Litem
- Chair CBC Alliance Board
- Co-chair Live Healthy Little Havana
