= Mike Redondo =

American politician

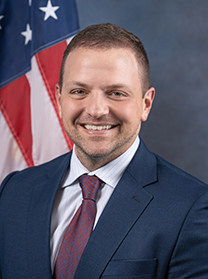

Member of the Florida House of Representatives from the 118th district
- Incumbent
- Assumed office December 5, 2023
- Preceded by: Juan Fernandez-Barquin

Personal details
- Born: December 27, 1984 (age 41) Miami, Florida, U.S.
- Party: Republican
- Spouse: Alina Yermolova (m. 2024)
- Education: University of Florida (BS); Florida State University (JD)

Mike Redondo (born December 27, 1984) is an American politician. He serves as a Republican member for the 118th district of the Florida House of Representatives.

== Life and career ==
Redondo was born in Miami, Florida to Cuban American parents. He graduated from the University of Florida where he obtained a degree in finance. Redondo also attended Florida State University where he obtained his Juris Doctor.

In 2023, Redondo defeated Johnny Farias and Francisco De La Paz in the special general election for the 118th district of the Florida House of Representatives, winning 51 percent of the votes. Redondo is Catholic and resides in Miami, FL. Redondo was reelected to the Florida House in November 2024, winning 68.3 percent of the votes.

On December 27, 2024, Redondo married Ukrainian refugee Alina Yermolova. The couple resides in Miami, Florida.

On June 30, 2025, all 22 members of the House GOP freshman class voted for Redondo to serve as Speaker after the 2030 elections.

Redondo is also an attorney and began his career at the Miami office of Holland and Knight LLP. He eventually founded his own law firm, Redondo Law PA, in 2019.
