= 1997 Miami mayoral election =

- November 4, 1997 (first round); November 13, 1997 (runoff)

Candidate	Xavier Suarez	Joe Carollo
First round	20,602; 46.8%	21,854; 49.6%
Runoff	~~23,598~~; ~~53.2%~~	20,739; 46.8%
Mayor before election
Joe Carollo
Elected mayor
Xavier Suarez (invalidated)
Joe Carollo

The 1997 Miami mayoral election took place on November 4 and November 13, 1997, to elect the mayor of Miami, Florida. It is notable for being overturned due to electoral fraud.

In the first round, incumbent Joe Carollo won 51.4% of ballots cast at the polls, while his main opponent, former Mayor Xavier Suarez, won 61.5% of absentee ballots. In total, Suarez had a slim 155-vote lead. Since no candidate received a majority, a runoff election was held, which Suarez won. Carollo challenged the results of the first round, claiming that absentee ballot fraud had denied him the majority needed to win without a runoff.

An investigation found that nearly 400 absentee ballots had been fraudulently cast, including by felons and dead people. United States circuit court judge Thomas S. Wilson Jr. threw out the results in the spring of 1998. He cited "a pattern of fraudulent, intentional and criminal conduct" in the casting of absentee ballots and wrote that "this scheme to defraud, literally and figuratively, stole the ballot from the hands of every honest voter in the city of Miami". Wilson ruled that there was no evidence Suarez had known about the fraud. He ordered a new election, but a state appeals court instead declared Carollo the winner outright.

== First round results ==
First round results
Party	Candidate	Votes	%
Nonpartisan	Joe Carollo (incumbent)	21,854	49.6
Nonpartisan	Xavier Suarez	20,602	46.8
Nonpartisan	Post	747	1.7
Nonpartisan	Merker	616	1.4
Nonpartisan	Perez	198	0.4

== Runoff results ==
Runoff results
Party	Candidate	Votes	%
Nonpartisan	Xavier Suarez votes invalidated	~~25,598~~	~~53.2~~
Nonpartisan	Joe Carollo (incumbent)	20,839	46.8

== Aftermath ==
Carollo would lose re-election in the 2001 election, in which Suarez was also an unsuccessful candidate. The two again faced each other for Miami mayor a third time in the 2025 Miami mayoral election, in which they were both unsuccessful contenders in a thirteen-candidate field.
