= Annette Taddeo =

American politician (born 1967)

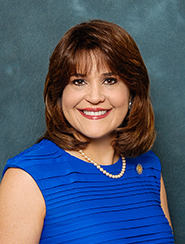

Member of the Florida Senate from the 40th district
- In office September 26, 2017 – November 8, 2022
- Preceded by: Frank Artiles
- Succeeded by: Alexis Calatayud (redistricted)

Personal details
- Born: Annette Joanne Taddeo; April 7, 1967 (age 59) Barrancabermeja, Colombia
- Party: Democratic
- Spouse: Eric Goldstein
- Children: 1 and 2 stepchildren
- Education: University of North Alabama (BA)
- Website: Campaign website

Annette Joanne Taddeo-Goldstein (née Taddeo /təˈdeɪ.oʊ/; born April 7, 1967) is an American politician and businesswoman who served as a member of the Florida Senate from the 40th district from 2017 to 2022. She is a member of the Democratic Party.

She ran unsuccessfully in several elections starting in 2008. She was Charlie Crist's running mate in the 2014 Florida gubernatorial election. In 2017, she was elected into the Florida Legislature in a special election. She was formerly a Democratic candidate in the 2022 Florida gubernatorial election, but withdrew to run for Congress in Florida's 27th congressional district to unsuccessfully challenge incumbent María Elvira Salazar. In 2024, she ran for Miami-Dade County Clerk and was defeated by incumbent Republican Juan Fernandez-Barquin.

During her Florida Senate tenure, she was on the Banking and Insurance Committee, which is tasked to financial and insurance oversight. She is running in the 2026 election as a candidate for Chief Financial Officer of Florida.

== Early life and education ==
Taddeo was born in Barrancabermeja, Colombia, to an Italian-American father and Colombian mother. Her early life was spent in Colombia until she moved to live with family friends in Huntsville, Alabama, at the age of 17. She graduated from the University of North Alabama with a degree in commercial Spanish. Shortly after, she moved to Miami. In 1995, Taddeo started a translation business, now called LanguageSpeak.

== Career ==
Taddeo entered politics in 2008 when she ran against Congresswoman Ileana Ros-Lehtinen for Florida's 18th Congressional District, which then included parts of coastal Miami-Dade and the Florida Keys. Taddeo was unopposed in the Democratic primary but lost to Ros-Lehtinen in the general election, 58% to 42%.

Two years later, Taddeo ran for an open seat on the Miami-Dade County Commission. She placed third in the nonpartisan primary, garnering 21%.

Taddeo remained active in local Democratic politics, and in December 2012 was elected chair of the county's Democratic Executive Committee. As county party chair, she organized support for successful Democratic candidates in Miami Beach, Homestead, and other local elections. She also led an effort for Democrats to compete in every local State House election in 2014. In the end, only two of the seats within the county lacked a Democratic candidate that year, the fewest since 1984.

=== 2014 Florida gubernatorial election ===
In July 2014, gubernatorial candidate Charlie Crist, who had previously served as governor as a Republican, named Taddeo as his running mate. The Crist-Taddeo ticket lost the general election to incumbent Republican governor Rick Scott and lieutenant governor Carlos López-Cantera, 48.1 to 47.1%.

=== 2016 congressional campaign ===
Taddeo ran for Congress again in 2016, in the 26th district, based in southern Miami-Dade and the Florida Keys. She lost the Democratic primary to former Congressman Joe Garcia, 51.3 to 48.7%. Garcia went on to lose the general election to the incumbent, Republican Carlos Curbelo. During the campaign, some of Taddeo's secret campaign documents, some of which highlighted her weaknesses as a candidate, were made public. It later came out that Taddeo was one of several Democratic House candidates targeted by Russian hackers, and the documents were stolen from the Democratic Congressional Campaign Committee and released to reporters and bloggers in order to undermine Democratic campaigns in competitive districts.

=== Florida Senate ===
In September 2017, Taddeo was elected in a special election for Florida's Senate District 40. The election was called to fill the vacancy caused by the resignation of Republican senator Frank Artiles. Taddeo won the primary election against former state representative and Miami-Dade School Board Member Ana Rivas Logan, 71 to 29%. Taddeo defeated Republican state representative José Félix Díaz in the general election, 51 to 47%. Upon being sworn in on October 10, 2017, Taddeo became the first Hispanic Democratic woman to hold a seat in the Florida Senate. She was re-elected in 2018.

=== 2022 Florida gubernatorial election ===
In October 2021, Taddeo announced she would run for the Democratic primary in the 2022 Florida gubernatorial election. She opposed Charlie Crist, whom she ran alongside in his 2014 campaign for governor.

In June 2022, Taddeo announced that she would exit the gubernatorial primary and would instead run in the 2022 Florida's 27th congressional district race. Taddeo defeated Ken Russell in the primary election on August 23 to win the Democratic nomination, and unsuccessfully challenged incumbent Republican María Elvira Salazar in the November general election.

=== 2022 congressional campaign ===
Taddeo won the primary in August against Miami City Commissioner Ken Russell and progressive activist Angel Montalvo. Despite trying to win over Latin voters in the historically Democratic Miami-Dade County and make Florida's 27th congressional district competitive, Taddeo lost by 34,634 votes to incumbent Maria Elvira Salazar.

=== 2023 Florida Democratic Party Chair campaign ===
Taddeo ran to become chair of the Florida Democratic Party in February 2023. She lost to former Florida commissioner of agriculture Nikki Fried.

=== 2024 Miami-Dade County Clerk campaign ===
In 2024, Taddeo ran for Miami-Dade County Clerk of the Circuit Court and Comptroller. She lost to incumbent Republican Juan Fernandez-Barquin 55 to 44%.

=== 2026 Florida CFO campaign ===
Taddeo is currently running for Florida Chief Financial Officer, having announced her campaign in June 2026.

== Personal life ==
Taddeo is married to Eric Goldstein, a Miami psychologist. They have a daughter, Sofia. Annette also has twin stepdaughters from her husband's previous marriage.

Taddeo was raised Catholic but converted to Judaism in her 20s.

== Electoral history ==
=== Early elections, 2008–16 ===
2008 General Election, Florida's 18th Congressional District
Party	Candidate	Votes	%
Republican	Ileana Ros-Lehtinen (incumbent)	140,617	57.9%
Democratic	Annette Taddeo	102,372	42.1%
Total votes		242,989	

2010 Nonpartisan Primary, Dade County Commission District 8
Candidate	Votes	%
Eugene Flinn	5,610	29.8
Lynda G. Bell	4,690	24.9
Annette Taddeo	3,991	21.2
A.E. "Albert" Harum-Alvarez	2,080	11.1
Obdulio Piedra	1,350	7.2
Daniel "Danny" Marmorstein	1,098	5.8
Total votes	18,819	

2014 Florida Gubernatorial Election
Party	Candidate	Votes	%
Republican	Rick Scott/Carlos López-Cantera	2,865,343	48.1%
Democratic	Charlie Crist/Annette Taddeo	2,801,198	47.1%
Libertarian	Adrian Wyllie/Greg Roe	223,356	3.8%
No Party Affiliation	Glenn Burkett/Jose Augusto Matos	41,341	0.7%
No Party Affiliation	Farid Khavari/Lateresa A. Jones	20,186	0.3%
Total votes		5,951,561	

2016 Democratic Primary, Florida's 26th Congressional District
Party	Candidate	Votes	%
Democratic	Joe Garcia	14,834	51.3%
Democratic	Annette Taddeo	14,108	48.7%
Total votes		28,942	

=== Florida Senate, 2017–18 ===
July 25, 2017 Special Democratic Primary, Florida Senate District 40
Party	Candidate	Votes	%
Democratic	Annette Taddeo	7,101	70.7%
Democratic	Ana Rivas Logan	2,941	29.3%
Total votes		10,042	

September 26, 2017 Special General Election, Florida Senate District 40
Party	Candidate	Votes	%
Democratic	Annette Taddeo	22,656	51.0%
Republican	José Félix Díaz	20,987	47.2%
No Party Affiliation	Christian "He-Man" Schlaerth	820	1.8%
Total votes		44,463	

November 6, 2018 General Election, Florida Senate District 40
Party	Candidate	Votes	%
Democratic	Annette Taddeo	90,924	53.5%
Republican	Marili Cancio	79,068	46.5%
Total votes		169,992	

=== Post-Senate career, 2022– ===
2022 Democratic Primary, Florida's 27th Congressional District
Party	Candidate	Votes	%
Democratic	Annette Taddeo	27,015	67.8%
Democratic	Ken Russell	10,337	25.9%
Democratic	Angel Montalvo	2,493	6.3%
Total votes		39,845	

Florida's 27th congressional district, 2022
Party	Candidate	Votes	%
Republican	Maria Elvira Salazar (incumbent)	136,038	57.3%
Democratic	Annette Taddeo	101,404	42.7%
Total votes		237,442	

2024 Miami-Dade County Clerk of the Circuit Court and Comptroller
Party	Candidate	Votes	%
Republican	Juan Fernandez-Barquin (incumbent)	580,202	55.4%
Democratic	Annette Taddeo	464,947	44.4%
Write-in		2,074	0.2%
Total votes		1,047,223	

Party political offices
Preceded by Rod Smith	Democratic nominee for Lieutenant Governor of Florida; 2014	Succeeded by Chris King
