= 2017 Florida State Senate 40th district special election =

A special election for Florida's 40th Senate district took place on September 26, 2017, to fill a vacancy. Democrat Annette Taddeo defeated Republican Jose Felix Diaz, with approximately 23,000 votes to 21,000.

The vacancy had been caused by Republican Senator Frank Artiles's resignation on April 21, 2017, after he unleashed a tirade of racist and sexist remarks to two African-American senators.

== Primaries ==
Primary elections took place on July 25, 2017.

=== Republican primary ===
127 of 138 precincts reporting.

Republican primary
| Party | Candidate | Votes | % |
|---|---|---|---|
| Republican | Jose Felix Diaz | 7,528 | 57.60% |
| Republican | Alex Diaz de la Portilla | 3,371 | 25.79% |
| Republican | Lorenzo J. Palomares | 2,171 | 16.61% |
| Total votes | | 13,070 | 100.00 |

=== Democratic primary ===
127 of 138 precincts reporting.

Democratic primary
| Party | Candidate | Votes | % |
|---|---|---|---|
| Democratic | Annette Taddeo | 6,955 | 70.59% |
| Democratic | Ana Rivas Logan | 2,897 | 29.41% |
| Total votes | | 9,852 | 100.00 |

=== Results ===
General election results
| Party | Candidate | Votes | % | ±% |
|---|---|---|---|---|
| Democratic | Annette Taddeo | 22,649 | 50.9% | |
| Republican | Jose Felix Diaz | 20,985 | 47.2% | |
| Independent | Christian Schlareth | 820 | 1.8% | |
| Majority | | 1,664 | 3.7% | |
| Turnout | | 44,454 | | |
| Democratic gain from Republican | | Swing | | |
