= Marvin Dunn =

American historian, educator (born 1940)

- Born: June 27, 1940 (age 85); DeLand, Florida, U.S.
- Education: Morehouse College (BA), Roosevelt University (MA), University of Tennessee–Knoxville (PhD)
- Occupations: Historian, psychology professor emeritus, author, newspaper columnist, filmmaker, activist

Marvin Dunn (born June 27, 1940) is an American historian, psychology professor emeritus, author, and filmmaker. He has written about the history of African Americans in South Florida. He lives in Miami, and ran unsuccessfully for mayor of the city in 1985.

== Life and career ==
Marvin Dunn was born on June 27, 1940, in DeLand, Florida. His parents were Corinne Elizabeth Williams and James C. Dunn Sr., his father worked as a farm and orchard picker. Dunn attended Euclid High School in DeLand.

Dunn graduated in 1961 with a bachelor's degree in psychology from Morehouse College in Atlanta; received a master's degree in education administration from Roosevelt University; and doctorate in psychology in 1972, from the University of Tennessee–Knoxville (now University of Tennessee) in Knoxville, Tennessee.

He served as a United States naval officer aboard aircraft carriers from 1961 until 1967.

Dunn is a professor emeritus at Florida International University (FIU), where he worked from 1972 until 2006. He chaired FIU's psychology department from 2000 until 2006.

Dunn ran in the 1985 Miami mayoral election, placing fourth with more than 7,000 votes.

Dunn helped found the Miami Center for Racial Justice. He gives Black history tours in Miami. In July 2024, the Miami Center for Racial Justice received a Mellon Foundation grant to extend their Black history tour work to Georgia, Alabama, and Mississippi.

In 2023 he was interviewed by WLRN about his life experiences and outlook. NBC-6 Miami made a documentary about Dunn in 2024.

In 2025, Dunn opposed the ceding of land in Miami by the state of Florida for a Donald J. Trump Presidential Library. CBS News interviewed him in 2025 about Donald Trump's push to reform history exhibits at the Smithsonian Institution museums.

A proposed affordable housing building is to be named after him in 2025. Morehouse College honored him with the Bennie Service Award in 2025.

== Publications ==
- Porter, Bruce D.; Dunn, Marvin (1984). The Miami Riot of 1980: Crossing the Bounds. Lexington Books. ISBN 978-0-669-07663-9.
- Dunn, Marvin (1997). Black Miami in the Twentieth Century. University Press of Florida. ISBN 9780813059570.
- Dunn, Marvin (2013). The Beast in Florida: A History of Anti-Black Violence. University Press of Florida. ISBN 9780813041636.
- Dunn, Marvin (2016). A History of Florida: Through Black Eyes. CreateSpace. ISBN 9781519372673.
- Dunn, Marvin (2022). The Kingsleys. (self published). ISBN 979-8818699585.

== Filmography ==
- Black Seminoles in the Bahamas: The Red Bays Story (2007), 26 minutes, by filmmaker Isaac Brown; about the departure of enslaved people from Florida to the Bahamas in the 1800s
- Murder on the Suwanee: The Willie James Howard Story (2009), by filmmaker Isaac Brown; about the lynching of a 15-year-old in Live Oak, Florida in 1944
- Rosewood Uncovered (2010), 29 minutes, by filmmaker Isaac Brown; about the Rosewood Massacre in 1923
- The Black Miami (2012), 140 minutes by filmmakers Michael Williams, Carlton Smith and Marvin Dunn; adapted from his book, Black Miami in the Twentieth Century (1997)
