= Ken Russell (politician) =

American politician

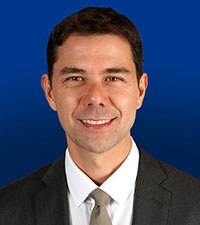

Member of the Miami City Commission from the 2nd district
- In office November 25, 2015 – December 29, 2022
- Preceded by: Marc Sarnoff
- Succeeded by: Sabina Covo

Personal details
- Born: Ken Joseph Russell; June 25, 1973 (age 53) Coral Gables, Florida, U.S.
- Party: Democratic
- Spouse: Juliana Benedini
- Children: 3
- Education: University of North Carolina, Chapel Hill (BS)

Ken Joseph Russell (born June 25, 1973) is an American politician and yo-yo champion from the state of Florida. A member of the Democratic Party, he served on the Miami City Commission from 2015 to 2022. He ran for mayor in the city's 2025 election, placing third in a crowded field.

As a city commissioner, Russell authored adopted ordinances that allowed co-living spaces to be created in the city, citing such residential accommodations as a means of addressing the city's housing shortage. He also authored an inclusionary zoning ordinance for the Omni district (the Arts & Entertainment District), which was adopted by the city but preempted by a subsequent state law. He also authored an adopted ordinance aimed at reducing fertilizer pollution to waterways in hopes of decreasing the incidents of algae blooms. Since leaving city government, he has worked in environmentalism as an outreach director for Longevity Partners, as well as a spokesperson and lobbyist for Sierra Club. In 2022, he unsuccessfully ran for the U.S. House of Representatives and also abandoned a campaign for U.S. Senate.

== Early life and career ==
Russell was born in Doctors Hospital in Coral Gables, Florida, and raised in Coconut Grove and Key Biscayne. Russell's father, Jack, was an international yo-yo champion and developed a patent on his brand of yo-yo. Jack worked for the Duncan Toys Company before breaking off to start his own. His mother, Kazuyo, was Japan's national yo-yo champion. The family moved from Miami to Stuart, Florida, after Hurricane David in 1979. Russell graduated from Martin County High School in 1991.

When he was 15 years old, Russell became a professional and went on international yo-yo tours. He attended the University of North Carolina at Chapel Hill. He earned a Bachelor of Science in Business Administration. After graduating, he went to work for his family's company. After the business suffered during the Great Recession, Russell opened a watersports store.

== Miami City Commission (2015–2022) ==
Russell served on the Miami City Commission, representing district 2. His district included the majority of the city's coastal neighborhoods, stretching from Coconut Grove at its south end up through Brickell, Downtown, Edgewater, to Morningide on its south end.

=== Commission elections ===
Russell had first became involved in local politics in 2013 when he and other residents of Coconut Grove insisted that the city remove, rather than cover, toxic soil from a park. In 2015, Russell ran to represent District 2 on the Miami City Commission. Incumbent Marc Sarnoff was prevented from running again due to term limits. Russell won the election with 42 percent; though he did not earn enough votes to automatically avoid a runoff, the second place finisher withdrew from the race.

In 2019, Russell was re-elected to a second term four-year term on the city commission.

=== Housing, homelessness, and urban development ===
One of Russell's major focuses as a city commissioner was housing affordability. In December 2018, the city commission adopted an inclusionary zoning ordinance sponsored by Russell which mandated the inclusion of affordable housing for new developments in the Omni district (the Arts & Entertainment District). In 2019, the state legislature and Governor Ron DeSantis enacted a bill that preempted this ordinance, nullifying it.

In late 2020, Russell sponsored an ordinance to allow the creation of co-living spaces in the city, citing it as a means of addressing the city's housing shortage. The ordinance was adopted, and such residential accommodations were soon after developed in the city. Russell collaborated with Mayor Francis Suarez on the ordinance and communicated with Rishi Kapoor (a Miami developer who campaigned in support of the ordinance's passage) about it. Mayor Suarez would, several years later, face investigations of impropriety when reporting emerged that Suarez was being paid at the time by Kapoor for consulting work. Russell would publicly state that he had been unaware of this dynamic between Kapoor and the mayor and had worked on the ordinance because he believed it could be a successful solution to some of the city's housing needs.

As part of his work on housing, while on the city commission Russell was also leader of the West Grove Community Redevelopment Agency.

In June 2020, Russell was the lone member of the city commission to vote against an ordinance introduced by Joe Carollo and Manolo Reyes which required individuals and organizations to receive a permit from the city in order to provide food to large groups of homeless people. The ordinance was adopted 3–1. At both its first reading in October and adoption in November 2021, Russell was the lone commissioner to side in opposition to an ordinance outlawing homeless encampments. The ordinance was received 4–1 approval from the council at both meetings, being adopted amid a rise in South Florida's homeless population. Rusell argued that the city's biggest cause of homelessness was a lack of affordable housing, and that the city needed to address that issue. He advocated for the city to utilize a mix of bond money approved by voters in 2018 and more-recently available federal COVID-19 pandemic impact relief money to construct 500 additional units of affordable housing on publicly-owned land.

Russell, whose district included the Downtown, expressed his belief in 2021 that a reactivated downtown had the potential to rival trendy and vibrant neighborhoods of the city such as the Design District, Wynwood and Midtown. He argued that investments in good infrastructure were the most impactful means that governments had at their disposal to reactivate vacant storefronts in the city's downtown. He supported the $27 million redesign of Flagler Street, underway at the time, into a shared space with a pedestrian-friendly design using curb-less concrete pavers. He predicted that upon the completion of the project, empty storefronts in the area would begin to attract new tenants. He also believed that the reconstruction of the Dolphin Expressway, which would see the addition of "The Underdeck" (30 acres (12 ha) of public parkland and trails, meant to connect to and compliment The Underline) would be transformative for the downtown.

=== Environmental protection; water quality ordinance ===
Environmental protection was a major focus of Russell during his time as a city commissioner.

In 2020, the city commission unanimously adopted a new water quality ordinance authored by Russell. The ordinance aims to reduce the amount of fertilizer pollution entering waterways in hopes of decreasing the incidents of algae blooms. The ordinance imposed new penalties for polluting. It was written in response to a significant 2020 fish kill in Biscayne Bay. He had developed the ordinance in collaboration with the city's Office of Resilience and the organizations such as the Sierra Club.

=== Other city matters ===
In 2017, Russell proposed an ordinance to replace the masculine-gendered terms "policeman" and "fireman" with the gender-neutral terms "police officer" and "firefighter" in the city charter and code.

=== Congressional and Senate campaigns ===
Russell announced in October 2017 that he would run for the U.S. House of Representatives for Florida's 27th congressional district in 2018, but he withdrew his candidacy in April 2018.

In 2021, Russell announced that he would run for the U.S. Senate in 2022, challenging incumbent Republican Marco Rubio. After determining that Val Demings was likely to win the Democratic nomination, he switched his candidacy to the U.S. House of Representatives for Florida's 27th district in May 2022. Russell lost the primary election on August 23 to Annette Taddeo.

=== Resignation ===
Russell resigned early from the Miami City Commission due to his 2022 campaign for U.S. Congress, as Florida had a new resign-to-run statute that had entered effect. In compliance with the law requiring him to resign prior to the scheduled term of the office he had been seeking, he initially chose to tender a resignation to take effect on January 3, 2023 (the day in which members of the 118th United States Congress would be sworn in). However, he ultimately instead left office days earlier on December 29, 2022 out of protest for the council's refusal to hold a December meeting. On November 17, at what proved to be his last commission meeting, Commissioner Alex Díaz de la Portilla introduced a motion with Commissioner Joe Carollo's backing to cancel the commission's December meeting. Russell had anticipated the December meeting being the last before his departure, and had planned to use that meeting to push for the adoption of several zoning change requests that the council could have approved to advance proposed new affordable housing to Coconut Grove. Once it became clear to him that the majority of commissioners intended to support the motion to cancel its December meeting, Russell declared he intended to resign even earlier than previously planned in protest, and stormed out of the meeting. The remaining commissioners in attendance preceded to pass the cancellation motion 3–1 with Commissioner Manolo Reyes being the lone dissenting vote. In the days that followed, Russell attempted to call a special meeting of the commission for the purposes of voting to re-instate the December meeting, but he could not amass quorum since Reyes was the only councilor that agreed to attend such a special meeting.

== Subsequent work ==
In November 2022, Russell accepted a job as the United States Director of Outreach for Longevity Partners, a consulting firm that advises governments and real estate businesses on matters of environmental sustainability and on environmental, social, and corporate governance. He has also, since departing the city commission, worked as a spokesperson and lobbyist for the Florida Sierra Club.

In 2024, Russell founded Arquest Partners, a Miami-based strategic consulting firm which he owns and operates. The firm's work focuses on matters related to environmentalism, government, housing, and transit.

== 2025 mayoral campaign ==
In early 2025, Russell announced that he would run in the 2025 Miami mayoral election. He was considered one of the six leading candidates in the thirteen-candidate field.

Russell centered his campaign on an anti-political corruption message. He proposed expanding the Miami City Commission from five members to seven members and imposing more strict term limits on city officeholders. He also proposed an affordable housing plan which would have included reallocating some Miami Forever Bond money to the West Grove Community Redevelopment Agency.

== Personal life ==
Russell and his wife, Juliana, have two daughters.
