= Robert Asencio =

American politician

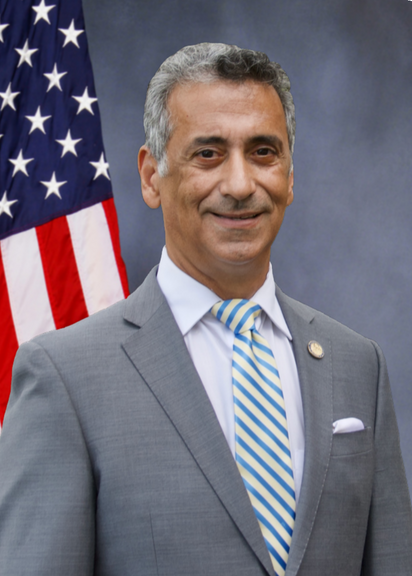

Member of the Florida House of Representatives from the 118th district
- In office November 8, 2016 – November 6, 2018
- Preceded by: Frank Artiles
- Succeeded by: Anthony Rodriguez

Personal details
- Born: August 1963 (age 62) New York City, New York, U.S.
- Party: Democratic
- Education: St. Thomas University (BA)
- Website: Campaign website

Military service
- Allegiance: United States
- Branch/service: United States Army
- Years of service: 1983–1989 (Reserve)

Robert Asencio (born August 1963) is an American Democratic politician and former Miami-Dade Schools Police Department captain from Florida. From 2016 to 2018, Asencio served in the Florida House of Representatives, representing part of Miami-Dade in District 118. In August 2022, he won the Democratic primary for the newly created Florida's 28th congressional district in the United States House of Representatives, and was defeated by incumbent Republican Carlos A. Giménez in the November general election.

== History ==
Asencio was born in Brooklyn, New York, in 1963. Asencio graduated from St. Thomas University with a BA in 2009. Asencio served in the United States Army Reserve and later went on to become a police captain.

== Florida House of Representatives ==
Asencio defeated Republican David Rivera in the Florida House of Representatives District 118 general election after running unopposed in the Democratic primary. He succeeded Frank Artiles. He sits on the Education Committee and on the Health Quality, Justice Appropriations, Post-Secondary Education, and PreK-12 Innovation subcommittees.

== See also ==
- Florida House of Representatives
- List of people from Brooklyn

Florida House of Representatives
Preceded by Frank Artiles	Member of the Florida House of Representatives from the 118th district 2016–2018	Succeeded by Anthony Rodriguez
