= Oliver Gilbert =

American politician (born 1972)

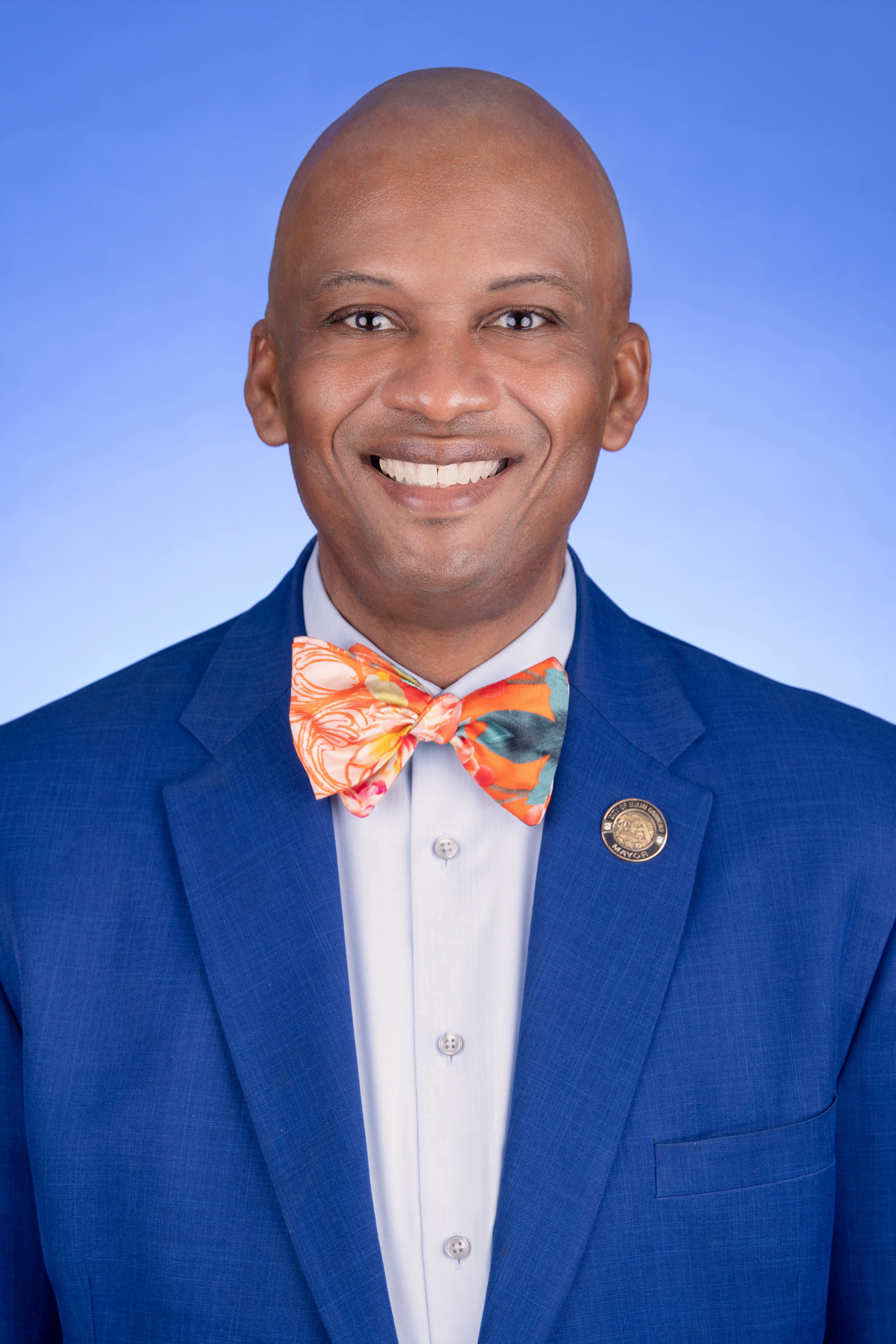
- Official portrait, 2020

Member-elect of the U.S. House of Representatives from Florida's 24th district
- Assuming office January 3, 2027
- Succeeding: Frederica Wilson

Member of the Miami-Dade County Commission from the 1st district
- Incumbent
- Assumed office November 17, 2020
- Preceded by: Barbara Jordan

Mayor of Miami Gardens
- In office 2012–2020
- Preceded by: Shirley Gibson
- Succeeded by: Rodney Harris

Personal details
- Born: Oliver Gene Gilbert III; August 15, 1972 (age 54) Miami Gardens, Florida, U.S.
- Party: Democratic
- Spouse: Walkiria Castillo
- Children: 1
- Education: Florida A&M University (BA); University of Miami (JD)

Oliver Gene Gilbert III (born August 15, 1972) is an American politician and attorney who has served as a Miami-Dade County Commissioner since 2020 as mayor of Miami Gardens from 2012 to 2020. A moderate Democrat, he is the Democratic nominee for the U.S. House of Representatives in Florida's 24th congressional district in 2026.

== Early life and education ==
Oliver Gene Gilbert III was born on August 15, 1972, in Miami Gardens, Florida. Gilbert received a B.A. in Criminal Justice from Florida A&M University and a J.D. from University of Miami School of Law.

== Career ==
He entered politics early out of law school in 2000, when then-state representative Dorothy Bendross-Mindingall hired him as a legislative aide. He then worked as deputy of policy for former US attorney general Janet Reno's gubernatorial campaign. A couple years later, after working first as a prosecutor and then in private practice, he vied for the mayoralty of the newly incorporated City of Miami Gardens in 2003 where he lost. He was appointed to the Miami Gardens council in 2008 and 4 years later was elected mayor, the second African-American to hold the position. Miami Gardens is Florida's largest city with a majority African American population and the 3rd largest city in Miami-Dade County.

When running for Miami-Dade County Commission he faced Sybrina Fulton, the mother of Trayvon Martin, who was killed by George Zimmerman in 2013. Although Hillary Clinton, Cory Booker, Elizabeth Warren and other high ranking figures in the Democratic Party endorsed Fulton, Gilbert won with 50.5% of the vote.

=== U.S. House of Representatives campaign ===
Following the retirement of incumbent Rep. Frederica Wilson, Gilbert announced his candidacy for the United States Congress in June 2026. He was endorsed for the seat by Wilson, Mayor Daniella Levine Cava, and Mayor Eileen Higgins. In the primary election for the Democratic nomination, Gilbert faced progressive state Sen. Shevrin Jones, Kendrick Meek Jr.—son of Kendrick Meek—and four others. During the campaign, Gilbert received criticism from the local press for attacking Jones for voting in-favor of renaming Palm Beach International Airport to President Donald J. Trump International Airport after Gilbert approved of renaming a street after Donald Trump in 2024. In August 2026, mass text messages were sent to residents of the district claiming Jones was HIV-positive; the text were sent from a group impersonating Equality Florida in "violation of federal law." An Equality Florida spokesperson criticized Gilbert and other candidates for their "unwillingness to denounce this smear tactic." Gilbert later released a statement, saying: "It's a lie. It's evil, hurtful, and it needs to stop." On August 18, 2026, Gilbert narrowly won the Democratic nomination, receiving 34.4% of the vote to Jones' 32%. In the general election, Gilbert is facing Republican nominee Mayonna Te Brown; however, winning the Democratic primary in the 24th district is considered "tantamount to election."

== Personal life ==
Gilbert loves bowties and frequently wears them. He is a brother in Omega Psi Phi fraternity.

U.S. House of Representatives
Preceded by Frederica Wilson	Member of the U.S. House of Representatives from Florida's 13th congressional district Taking office 2027	Elect
