= Juan Fernandez-Barquin =

American politician from Florida

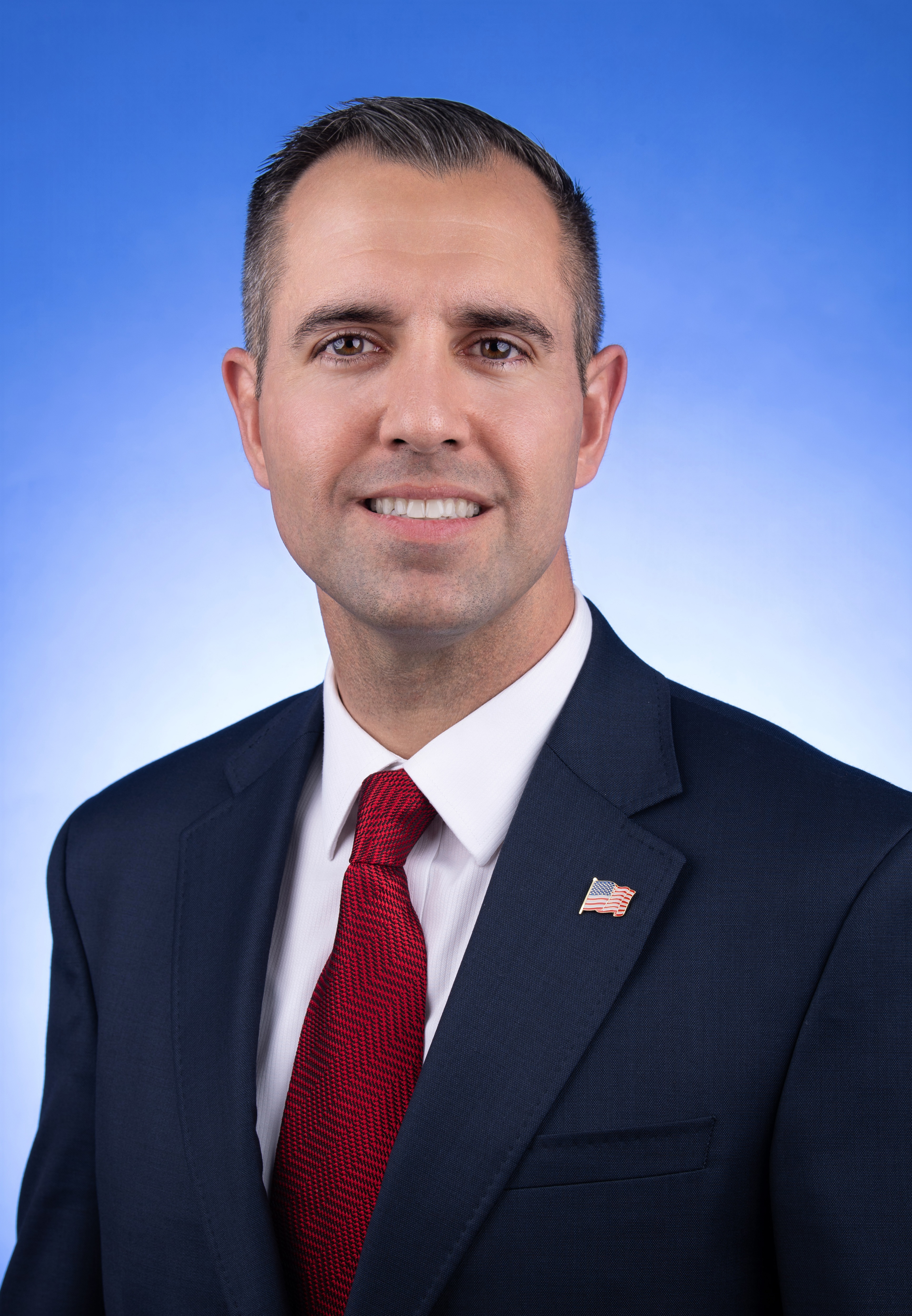
- Official portrait, 2023

Clerk of Court and Comptroller of Miami-Dade County
- Incumbent
- Assumed office June 12, 2023
- Preceded by: Harvey Ruvin

Member of the Florida House of Representatives from the 118th district
- In office November 6, 2018 – June 11, 2023
- Preceded by: Jeanette Nuñez
- Succeeded by: Mike Redondo

Personal details
- Born: Juan Alfonso Fernandez-Barquin; March 6, 1983 (age 43) Miami, Florida, U.S.
- Party: Republican
- Spouse: Catalina Santaella
- Education: Belen Jesuit Preparatory School
- Alma mater: Florida International University (BA); American University (JD)
- Occupation: Attorney; politician; professor

Juan Alfonso Fernandez-Barquin (born March 6, 1983) is an American attorney, politician, and professor who has served as the clerk of court and comptroller of Miami-Dade County since 2023. A member of the Republican Party, he previously served in the Florida House of Representatives from 2018 to 2023.

== Early life and career ==
Fernandez-Barquin was born on March 6, 1983, in Miami, Florida. He graduated from Belen Jesuit Preparatory School and earned his bachelor's degree in economics from Florida International University. He received his Juris Doctor from the Washington College of Law.

Fernandez-Barquin served as an assistant public defender in Palm Beach County before returning to Miami in 2013 to open his private law firm.

He serves on the governing board of Jackson Health System and works as an adjunct professor at Miami Dade College.

== Florida House of Representatives ==
Fernandez-Barquin defeated three opponents in the August 28th Republican primary, winning 44.2% of the vote. In the 2018 general election, Fernandez-Barquin won 53.09% of the vote, defeating Democrat Heath Rassner and a third candidate. He was reelected to the state House in 2020 and 2022.

During his tenure, he served as Chair of the Ethics, Elections & Open Government Subcommittee and was a member of the State Affairs Committee, Ways and Means Committee, Energy, Communications & Cybersecurity Subcommittee, and Justice Appropriations Subcommittee.

Fernandez-Barquin resigned from the House on June 11, 2023.

== Miami-Dade County Clerk (2023–present) ==
On June 9, 2023, Governor Ron DeSantis appointed Fernandez-Barquin as clerk of the circuit court of Miami-Dade County, following the prior clerk's death. He was officially sworn into office on June 12, 2023. As clerk, he manages an office of 1,300 employees and oversees an annual operating budget of approximately $145 million.

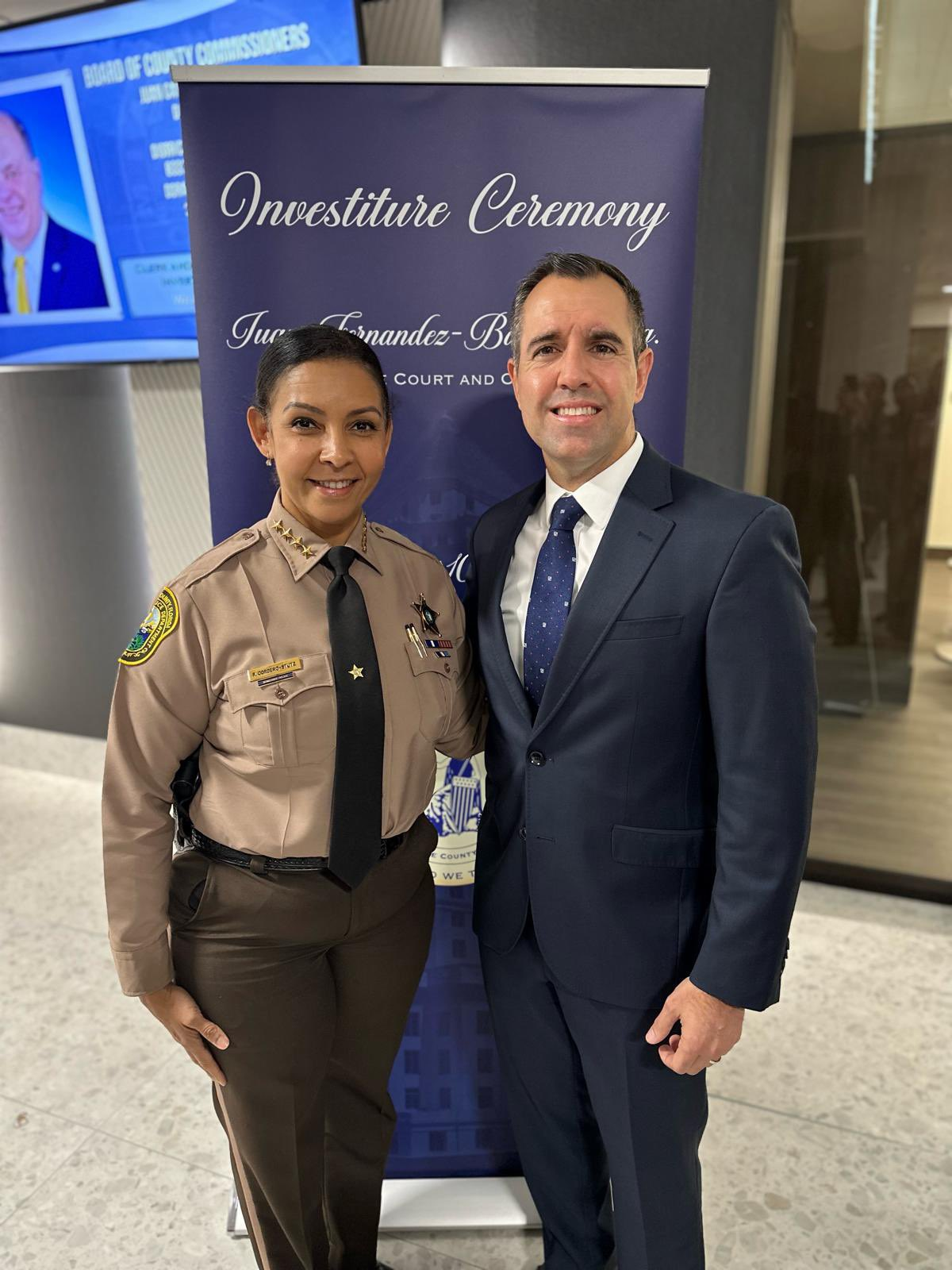
Fernandez-Barquin with Sheriff Rosie Cordero-Stutz, 2025

In the 2024 Miami-Dade County Clerk election, Fernandez-Barquin defeated Democratic nominee Annette Taddeo with 55.4% of the vote.

== Personal life ==
Fernandez-Barquin is married to his wife, Catalina Santaella. He is Roman Catholic.

== Electoral history ==
Miami-Dade County Circuit Court Clerk and Comptroller election, 2024
Party	Candidate	Votes	%
Republican	Juan Fernandez-Barquin (incumbent)	580,202	55.4
Democratic	Annette Taddeo	464,947	44.4
Independent	Rubin Young	2,074	0.2
Total votes		1,047,223	100.00
