= 2001 Miami mayoral election =

- November 6, 2001 (primary election); November 13, 2001 (runoff)

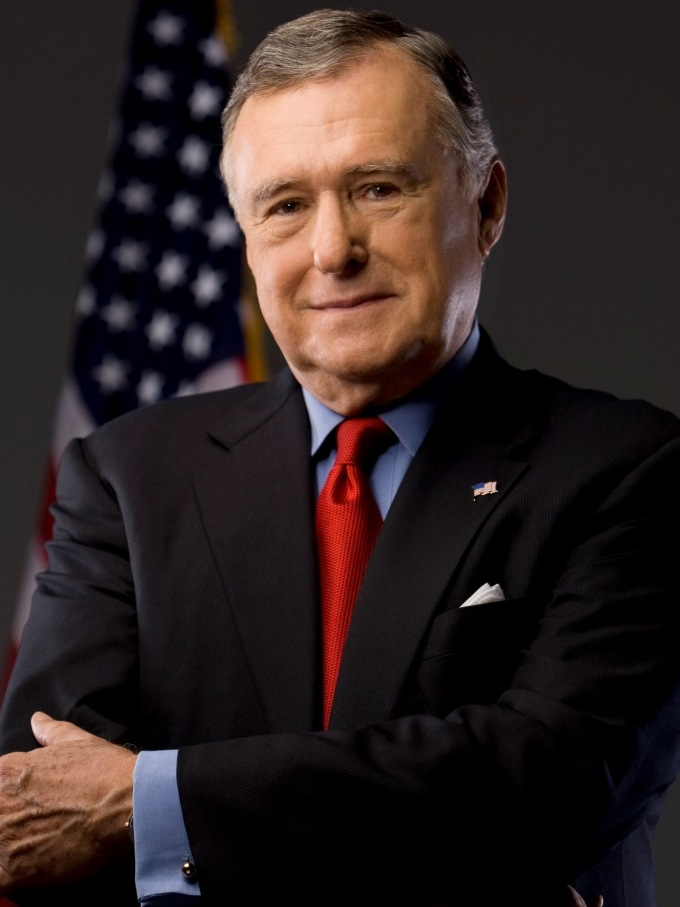

Candidate	Manny Diaz	Maurice Ferré	Joe Carollo
First round	10,808; 23.73%	14,310; 31.42%	10,581; 23.23%
Runoff	28,051; 55.25%	22,718; 44.75%	eliminated
Candidate	Jose Garcia-Pedrosa	Willy Gort	Xavier Suarez
First round	3,284; 7.21%	2,844; 6.24%	2,292; 5.03%
Runoff	eliminated	eliminated	eliminated
Mayor before election
Joe Carollo
Republican
Elected Mayor
Manny Diaz
Nonpartisan

The 2001 Miami mayoral election took place on November 13, 2001, following a first-round election on November 6, 2001. Incumbent Mayor Joe Carollo, who won the 1997 mayoral election after successfully contesting the election results, initially announced that he would not seek re-election after his wife filed for divorce. Carollo reconsidered the decision, and though he was arrested for domestic violence on February 7, 2001, he ultimately announced that he would run for re-election.

By the time that Carollo announced his re-election campaign, several prominent candidates had entered the race, including former Mayor and County Commissioner Maurice Ferré, former City Manager Jose Garcia-Pedrosa, City Commissioner Willy Gort, former Mayor Xavier Suarez, and attorney Manny Diaz, an attorney for Elián González's family.

In the primary election, Ferré placed first, winning 31 percent of the vote. Diaz narrowly defeated Carollo for second place, winning 24 percent of the vote to Carollo's 23 percent, and advancing to a runoff election with Ferré. In the general election, Diaz defeated Ferré by a wide margin, receiving 55 percent of the vote.

== Primary election ==
=== Candidates ===
- Maurice Ferré, former Mayor, former County Commissioner
- Manny Diaz, attorney
- Joe Carollo, incumbent Mayor
- Jose Garcia-Pedrosa, former City Manager
- Wifredo "Willy" Gort, City Commissioner, former acting mayor
- Xavier Suarez, former Mayor
- Danny Couch, home-buying counselor
- Emiliano Antunez, businessman
- Michael Italie, Socialist Workers Party activist
- Juan Miguel Alfonso, retired accountant

=== Polling ===
Poll source	Date(s) administered	Sample size (Note: Key: A – all adults RV – registered voters LV – likely voters V – unclear)	Margin of error	Maurice Ferré	Manny Diaz	Joe Carollo	Jose Garcia- Pedrosa	Willy Gort	Xavier Suarez	Danny Couch	Undecided
Schroth & Associates	October 2–4, 2001	600 (RV)	± 4.0%	23%	9%	20%	8%	8%	8%	1%	23%

=== Results ===
Primary election results
Party	Candidate	Votes	%
Nonpartisan	Maurice Ferré	14,310	31.42
Nonpartisan	Manny Diaz	10,808	23.73
Nonpartisan	Joe Carollo (incumbent)	10,581	23.23
Nonpartisan	Jose Garcia-Pedrosa	3,284	7.21
Nonpartisan	Wifredo "Willy" Gort	2,844	6.24
Nonpartisan	Xavier Suarez	2,292	5.03
Nonpartisan	Danny Couch	998	2.19
Nonpartisan	Emiliano Antunez	290	0.64
Nonpartisan	Michael Italie	93	0.20
Nonpartisan	Juan Miguel Alfonso	49	0.11
Total votes		45,549	100

== General election ==
=== Polling ===
Poll source	Date(s) administered	Sample size	Margin of error	Maurice Ferré	Manny Diaz	Undecided
Schroth & Associates	October 2–4, 2001	600 (RV)	± 4.0%	45%	34%	21%
Schroth & Associates	November 7–8, 2001	400 (LV)	± 5.0%	36%	45%	19%

=== Results ===
2001 Miami mayoral election results
Party	Candidate	Votes	%
Nonpartisan	Manny Diaz	28,051	55.25
Nonpartisan	Maurice Ferré	22,718	44.75
Total votes		50,769	100
