= Government of Miami-Dade County =

System of government of US county

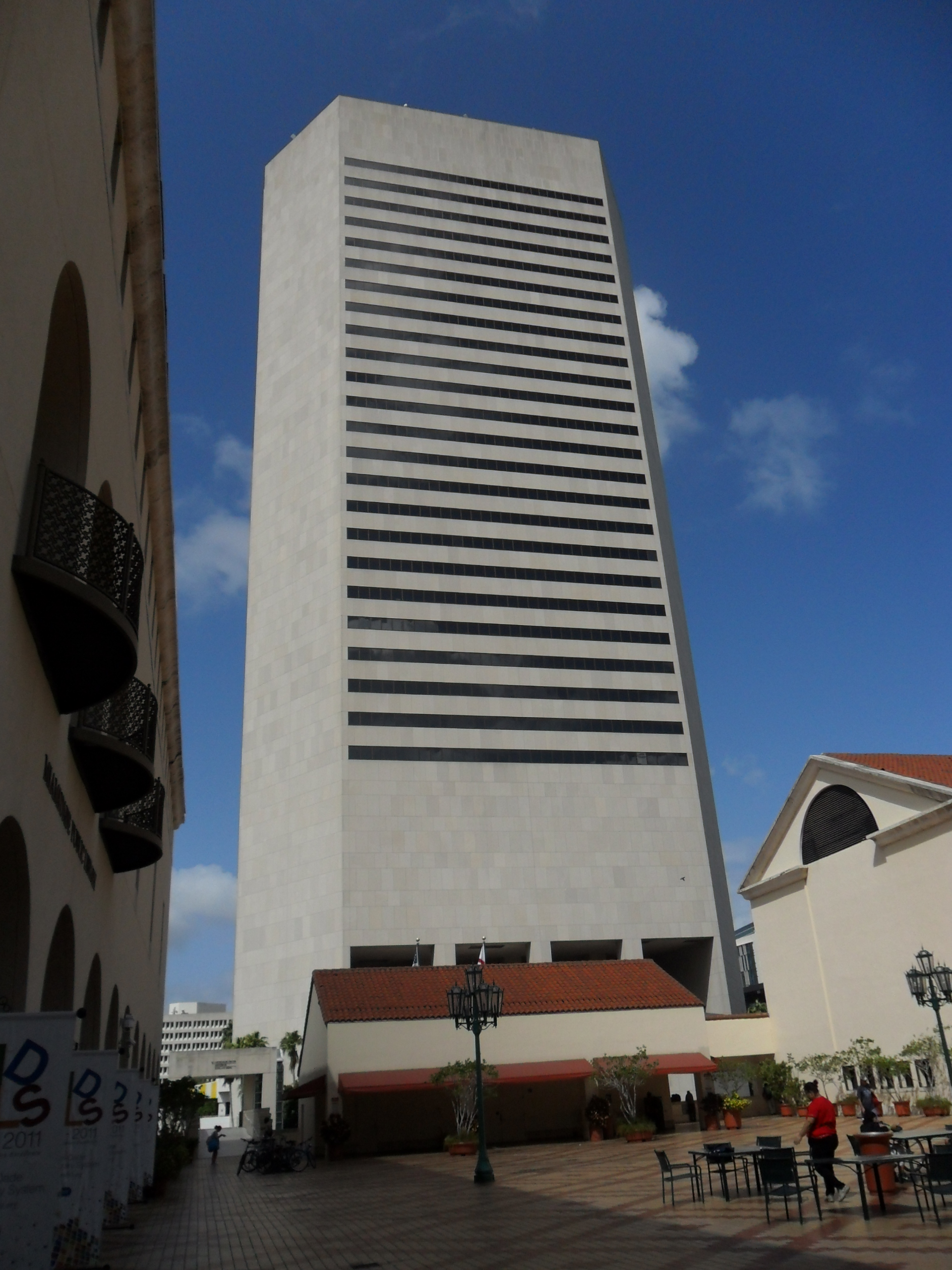
The Stephen P. Clark Government Center, the headquarters of the Miami-Dade government

The government of Miami-Dade County is defined and authorized under the Constitution of Florida, Florida law, and the Home Rule Charter of Miami-Dade County.

Since its formation in 1957, the county has had a two-tier system of government. Under this system, Miami-Dade comprises a large unincorporated area and 34 incorporated areas or municipalities. Each municipality has its own government and provides such city-type services as police and zoning protection.

In 2018, a state constitutional amendment was passed that made the positions of county tax collector, property appraiser, supervisor of elections, and sheriff independent elected offices.

== Overview ==
Of the county's 2,751,796 total residents (as of 2017), approximately 44% live in unincorporated areas, most of which are heavily urbanized. These residents are part of the Unincorporated Municipal Services Area (UMSA). For these residents, the county fills the role of both lower- and upper-tier government, the County Commission acting as their lower-tier municipal representative body. Residents within UMSA pay an UMSA tax, equivalent to a city tax, which is used to provide county residents with equivalent city services (police, fire, zoning, water and sewer, etc.). Residents of incorporated areas do not pay UMSA tax.

== Board of County Commissioners ==
Miami-Dade Board of County Commissioners
- Seal of Miami-Dade County

Type
- Type: County Commission
- Term limits: 8 years

Leadership
- Chair: Anthony Rodriguez (R) since 2024
- Vice Chair: Kionne McGhee (D) since 2024

Structure
- Seats: 13
- Political groups: Officially nonpartisan: Republican (7); Democratic (6)
- Length of term: 4 years

Elections
- Last election: November 3, 2026

Website
- Official website

The Miami-Dade Board of County Commissioners is the governing body of unincorporated Miami-Dade County and has broad regional powers to establish policies for Miami-Dade County services. The government provides major metropolitan services countywide and city-type services for residents of unincorporated areas.

One county commissioner is elected from each of Miami-Dade County's 13 districts to serve a four-year term. Residents choose only from among candidates running in the district in which they live. Commissioners are chosen in non-partisan, single-district elections and can serve two four-year staggered terms, with elections scheduled every two years. The commissioners elect a chairperson, and the chairperson appoints the members, chairperson and vice chairperson of all standing committees.

In November 2012, the Miami-Dade County Term Limit Amendment was approved, modifying the county charter to establish term limits of two consecutive four-year terms.

As of November 2025, there are seven Republicans and six Democrats, though elections are nonpartisan.

District	Commissioner	First elected	Party	Notes
1st	Oliver Gilbert	2020	Democratic	
2nd	Marleine Bastien	2022	Democratic	
3rd	Keon Hardemon	2020	Democratic	
4th	Micky Steinberg	2022	Democratic	
5th	Vicki Lopez	2025	Republican	2025 *appointed*
6th	Natalie Milian Orbis	2022	Republican	
7th	Raquel A. Regalado	2020	Republican	
8th	Danielle Cohen Higgins	2022	Democratic	2020 *appointed*
9th	Kionne McGhee	2020	Democratic	Elected as Vice Chair in 2024
10th	Anthony Rodriguez	2022	Republican	Elected as Chair in 2024
11th	Roberto J. Gonzalez	2024	Republican	2022 *appointed*
12th	Juan Carlos Bermudez	2022	Republican	
13th	René García	2020	Republican	

== Organization ==
An executive mayor and the Miami-Dade Board of County Commissioners (BCC) govern the county. The county's main administrative offices are located in the Stephen P. Clark Center (SPCC) at 111 NW 1st Street in downtown Miami.

=== Elected officers ===
In addition to the county commission, there are several elected "constitutional officers" that form the Government of Miami-Dade County that are required by the Florida Constitution and Florida law and authorized under the charter.

==== Mayor ====
The mayor is an independently elected county executive. The incumbent mayor of Miami-Dade County is Democrat Daniella Levine Cava (2020–present).

==== Sheriff ====
Florida sheriffs are vested with wide-ranging constitutional powers as both county officers and a part of the state judicial branch. The incumbent sheriff of Miami-Dade County is Republican Rosie Cordero-Stutz (2025–present).

==== State attorney ====
The state attorney is a state and county official, serving as both the chief prosecutor of the state circuit court and county court. The incumbent state attorney for Miami-Dade County is Democrat Katherine Fernandez Rundle (1993–present).

==== Clerk of the circuit court ====
The clerk of the circuit court is a state and county official, serving as both the clerk of the state circuit court and county court. The clerk also functions as the ex-officio county comptroller, county auditor, county recorder, and clerk to the board of county commissioners. The incumbent Miami-Dade County clerk of court is Republican Juan Fernandez-Barquin (2023–present).

==== Public defender ====
The public defender is a state and county official, representing county residents in both the state circuit court and county court. The incumbent public defender of Miami-Dade County is Democrat Carlos J. Martinez (2009–present).

==== Property appraiser ====
The incumbent property appraiser of Miami-Dade County is Republican Tomás Regalado (2025–present).

==== Supervisor of elections ====
The incumbent Miami-Dade County supervisor of elections is Republican Alina Garcia (2025–present).

==== Tax collector ====
The tax collector is charged with collecting county and state taxes in addition to its role as head of the county DMV. The incumbent tax collector of Miami-Dade County is Republican Dariel Fernandez (2025–present).

== Departments ==
- Miami-Dade Transit oversees the largest transit system in Florida, operating the Metrorail, Metromover, and Metrobus.
- The Miami-Dade County Department of Animal Services
- The Miami-Dade County Department of Audit and Management Services
- The Miami-Dade Aviation Department (Miami International Airport)
- The Miami-Dade County Communications Department
- The Miami-Dade County Department of Community Action and Human Services
- The Miami-Dade County Department of Corrections and Rehabilitation
- The Miami-Dade County Department of Cultural Affairs
- The Miami-Dade County Department of Elections
- The Miami-Dade County Department of Finance
- The Miami-Dade Fire Rescue Department (MDFR)
- The Miami-Dade County Department of Human Resources
- The Miami-Dade County Department of Information Technology
- The Miami-Dade County Department of Internal Services
- The Miami-Dade County Department of Juvenile Services
- The Miami-Dade Public Library System
- The Miami-Dade County Department of Management and Budget
- The Miami-Dade County Department of Medical Examiner
- The Miami-Dade County Department of Parks, Recreation and Open Spaces Department. Miami-Dade County Parks is the third largest county park system in the United States, consisting of 270 parks and 13,573 acres of land.
- The Miami-Dade Sheriff's Office (MDSO)
- The Miami-Dade County Department of Public Housing and Community Development (PHCD)
- The Miami-Dade County Department of Regulatory and Economic Resources
- The PortMiami
- The Miami-Dade County Department of Solid Waste Management
- The Miami-Dade County Department of Transportation and Public Works (DTPW)
- The Miami-Dade County Department of Vizcaya Trust (Vizcaya Museum and Gardens)
- The Miami-Dade County Department of Water and Sewer
- Jackson Health System (Public Health Trust of Miami-Dade County)

== See also ==
- Government of Miami
- Government of Florida
