= List of Belen Jesuit Preparatory School people =

The following is a list of notable past pupils and faculty of the Belen Jesuit Preparatory School.

== Academics ==
Name	Class year	Notability	Reference(s)
Luis E. Aguilar Leon	1944	Writer and professor emeritus of Georgetown University	
Xavier Briggs	1985	Senior fellow, the Brookings Institution; former vice-president, the Ford Foundation; former associate director of the White House Office of Management and Budget under President Barack Obama and senior policy official at the US Department of Housing and Urban Development under President Bill Clinton; former professor of Sociology and Urban Planning at the Massachusetts Institute of Technology (MIT), and a former faculty member of Harvard University's Kennedy School of Government	
Jorge I. Dominguez	1963	Faculty member at Harvard University, Academy for International and Area Studies	
Alberto Martinez Piedra	1946	Former US ambassador to Guatemala and professor at The Institute of World Politics	
Salvador Miranda	1958	Church historian and librarian	

== Entertainers and athletes ==
Name	Class year	Notability	Reference(s)
Louis Aguirre	1984	Television anchor	
Frankie J. Alvarez	2001	Actor in Looking on HBO	
Raúl Esparza	1988	Stage actor, singer, and voice artist noted for his roles on Broadway shows and Law & Order: Special Victims Unit	
Marcello Hernández	2015	Comedian, cast member on Saturday Night Live	
Mario Armando Lavandeira Jr.	1996	Founder of PerezHilton.com and host of What Perez Sez on VH1	
Nick Martinez	2008	Starting pitcher for the Tampa Bay Rays	
Alberto Mendoza	Attended	Backup quarterback of the Indiana Hoosiers' 2026 College Football Playoff National Championship team; current quarterback for the Georgia Tech Yellow Jackets	
Fernando Mendoza	Attended	2025 Heisman Trophy winner and starting quarterback of the Indiana Hoosiers' 2026 College Football Playoff National Championship team	

== Entrepreneurs ==
Name	Class year	Notability	Reference(s)
Francisco Aruca	1959	Radio host and businessman	
Cesar Conde	1991	2002–2003 White House fellow; president of Univision Networks at Univision Communications, Inc.	
Antonio Garcia Martinez	1994	Tech entrepreneur and author	
Roberto Goizueta	1947	Former CEO of Coca-Cola; amesake of the Emory University School of Business	
Michael Sayman	2014	Mobile application entrepreneur and author; developed Instagram Stories; engineer at Meta AI	

== Journalists ==
Name	Class year	Notability	Reference(s)
Oscar J. Corral	1992	Writer for The Miami Herald; covers Cuban politics and the exile community	
Tom Llamas	1997	Weekend anchor for ABC World News Tonight	
German Pinelli	1925	Journalist and actor	
Roberto Suárez	1946	Former president of The Miami Herald and El Nuevo Herald	

== Politicians in Cuba ==
Name	Class year	Notability	Reference(s)
Fidel Castro	1944	Former president and prime minister of Cuba	
Raul Castro	Attended	Former president and prime minister of Cuba	
Miguel Ángel de la Campa y Caraveda	1900	Cuban foreign minister, attorney general, diplomat	
Antonio Prío Socarrás	1923	Cuban Minister of Housing, 1948–1952	
Carlos Prío Socarrás	1921	16th president of Cuba	
Francisco Prío Socarrás	1920	Cuban senator, 1944–1952	
Antonio Sánchez de Bustamante y Sirven	1883	Cuban senator (1902–1918), author, and jurist (judge of the Permanent Court of International Justice at the Hague (1922-1942), nominee for the Nobel Peace Prize of 1949	

== Politicians in the United States ==
Name	Class year	Notability	Reference(s)
Gaston Cantens	1979	Former member of the Florida House of Representatives	
Miguel Diaz de la Portilla	1981	Former Miami-Dade County commissioner; current Florida state senator	
Manny Diaz	1973	Former mayor of Miami and president of the United States Conference of Mayors	
Joe Garcia	1982	Former U.S. representative for Florida's 26th congressional district; sworn into his first two-year term on January 3, 2013	
Carlos Curbelo	1998	Former U.S. representative for Florida's 26th congressional district	
Humberto Hernandez Jr.	1980	Former City of Miami commissioner	
Marcelo Llorente	1994	Former representative, Florida House District 116	
Carlos Manrique	1978	Former member of the Florida House of Representatives	
Xavier Suarez	Attended	Former mayor of Miami and Miami-Dade County commissioner	
Carlos Trujillo	2001	Former member of the Florida House of Representatives District 116 and current U.S. ambassador to the Organization of American States	

== Priests ==
Name	Class year	Notability	Reference(s)
Eduardo J. Alvarez, S.J	1963 & faculty	Pastor at Gesu Church, Miami, Florida	
Braulio Orue-Vivanco	1860	First bishop of the Roman Catholic Diocese of Pinar del Rio	
Enrique San Pedro, S.J.	1946 & faculty	4th bishop of the Roman Catholic Diocese of Brownsville	

== Scientists ==
Name	Class year	Notability	Reference(s)
Carlos Finlay	Faculty	Physician and epidemiologist; proposed the mode of transmission of yellow fever	
