= Colegio de Belén, Havana =

Private religious school in Havana, Cuba

Colegio de Belén
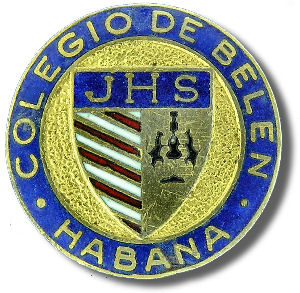

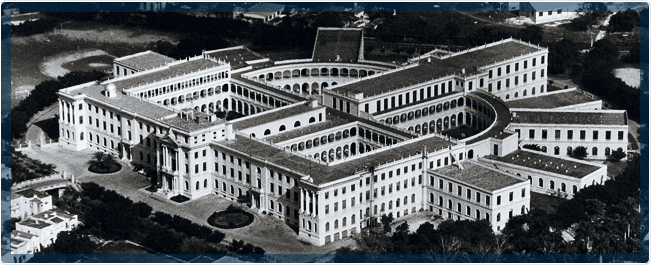
- Interactive map of the Colegio de Belén area
- Former names: Colegio de Belén

General information
- Type: Educational
- Architectural style: Eclectic
- Location: Marianao, Ciudad de La Habana, Cuba
- Coordinates: 23.096°N 82.417°W
- Current tenants: Cuban military
- Named for: The Palace of Education
- Opened: 1925
- Owner: Cuban military

Technical details
- Structural system: Steel frame
- Floor count: 4
- Grounds: 190,000 m2

Design and construction
- Architect: Leonardo Morales y Pedroso
- Architecture firm: Morales & Cia

The Colegio de Belén is a private religious school in Marianao, Havana, located between 45th and 66th streets, next to the Tropicana nightclub. It was designed in 1925 by the architect Leonardo Morales y Pedroso and his brother, an engineer, Luis Morales y Pedroso of the firm Morales y Compañía Arquitectos.

== History ==
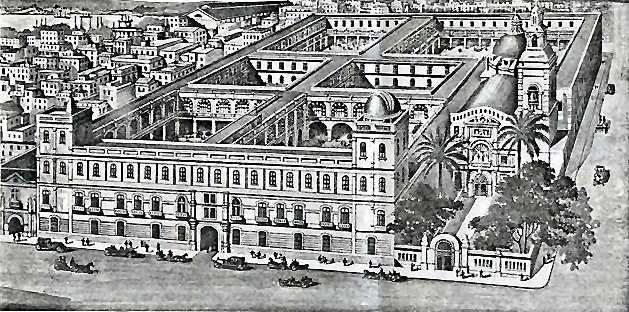
Convento de Belén (1854–1925), Calle Compostela, between Luz y Acosta, 1854–1925, Havana Vieja

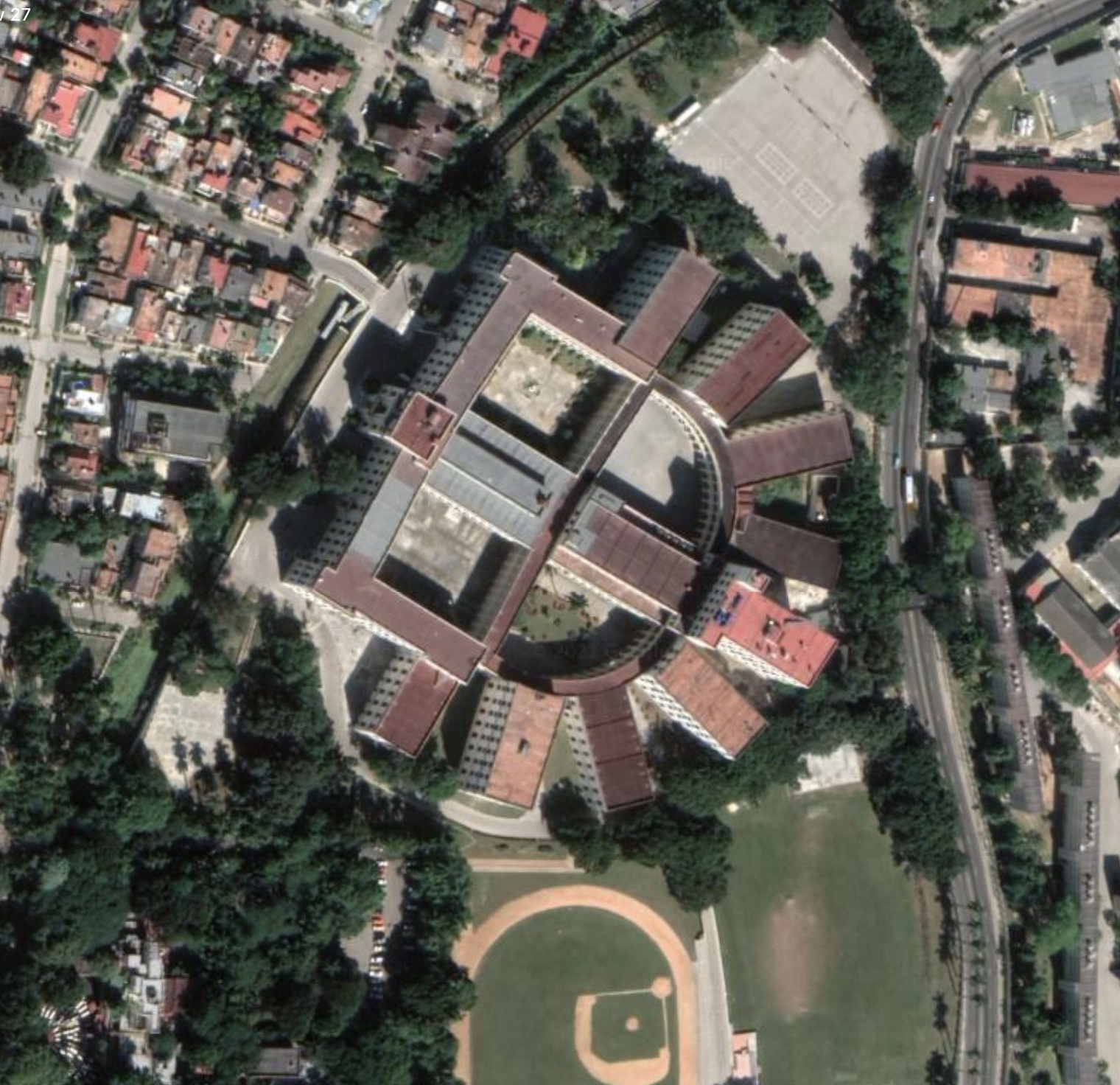
Colegio de Belén, Havana, Cuba

Her Majesty Isabella II, Queen of Spain, issued a royal charter in the year 1854 founding the Colegio de Belén (Belen School) in Havana, Cuba. Belen began its educational work in the building formerly occupied by the convent and convalescent hospital of Our Lady of Belén in Havana Vieja. A meteorological observatory was established in 1857. A facility was built in 1896.

The building was constructed on sixty acres of land that had been donated and was to be used as the main building of the Colegio de Belén. The original building, a convent in Havana Vieja had been opened in 1854 within the premises of the formerly occupied convent and convalescent hospital of Our Lady of Belen. Those premises had become unsuitable and badly located due to the change of atmosphere in the neighborhood and the growth of the city. The project was designed by the Cuban architectural firm of Morales & Cia (architect Leonardo Morales y Pedroso and Engineer Luis Morales y Pedroso) in 1925, with an unlimited budget for designing a religious school, the Colegio de Belén, Havana.

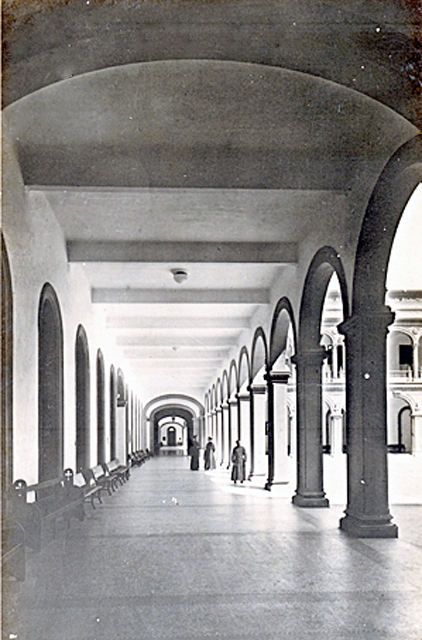
Exterior hallway

From 1925 to 1961, and located in the Marianao municipality, on an area of approximately 190,000 m2, emerged in the twenties of the last century, the new building with plans approved in Rome by Wlodimiro Ledochowsky, General of the Society of Jesus, in June 1921.

In mid-1923 the construction of this property was started, carried out by the company of architects and engineers Morales y Compañía Arquitectos, being built nine radiating pavilions, a central chapel of three floors, an entrance pavilion that had a fourth level where it was located the observatory. Its inaugural activities were carried out on December 19, 20 and 21, 1925, beginning its first course in January 1926. The result was a monumental pan-optical edifice with an extensive neoclassical façade perpendicular to the large chapel and four large courtyards, recalling the building housing the convent in Havana Vieja, with three stories of porticoed galleries to link nine radial pavilions, the appearance is of instrumentality which is supported both in the design resources and the unusual dimensions of the spaces. The structure is built from the concrete-covered steel structure, the flooring, covered with tiles, and the roof are monolithic reinforced concrete slabs.

== Chapel ==
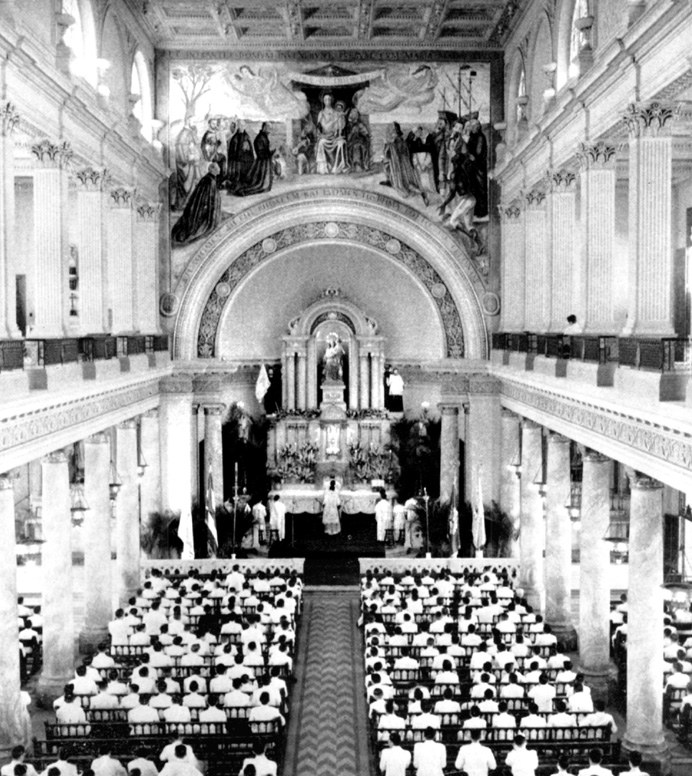
Chapel

The chapel was centrally located in plan, it had a wide central nave of triple height with a mural by Hipolito Hidalgo de Caviedes (1901–1994). It had two side aisles. El Colegio de Belen was known as "The Palace of Education."

== 1961 ==
In 1961 the government of Fidel Castro (himself a graduate of Belen) confiscated all private and religious schools in Cuba. Castro expelled the Jesuits and declared the government of Cuba an atheist government. Castro's government nationalized businesses and banks, confiscating more than $1 billion in American-owned property. Thousands of those dubbed “enemies of the revolution” were executed or imprisoned, and the school curriculum was reshaped by communist doctrine. Free speech was not an option, and the Cuban socialist press was an extension of the government.

Following their expulsion, the Jesuits reopened the school in Miami, Florida where it still exists to this day as Belen Jesuit Preparatory School.

== Rectors in the first Belen school ==
Calle Compostela, between Luz y Acosta (Havana, 1854–1925).

- 1. Bartolomé Munar (1854–1857)
- 2. Manuel Solís Pajares (Interino 1857–1858)
- 3. José María Lluch (1858–1862)
- 4. Buenaventura Feliú (1862–1868)
- 5. Andrés García Rivas (1868–1874)
- 6. Angel Rosendo Gallo (1874–1881)
- 7. Tomás Ipiña (1881–1885)
- 8. Isidoro Zameza (1885–1889)
- 9. Benigno Iriarte (1889–1893)
- 10. José María Palacio (1893–1899)
- 11. Vicente Leza (1899–1908)
- 12. Silverio Eraña (1908–1909)
- 13. Fernando Ansoleaga(1909–1915)
- 14. Antonino Oráa (1915–1918)
- 15. Pedro Abad 1918–1922
- 16. Claudio García Herrero (1922–1924)
- 17. Camilo García (1924–1925)

== Rectors in the new premises of Marianao ==
- 18. Antonio Galán (1925–1930)
- 19. Enrique Carvajal (1930–1931)
- 20. Ignacio Francia (1931–1938)
- 21. Ramón Calvo Hernández-Agero (1938–1940)
- 22. Daniel Baldor de la Vega (1940–1947)
- 23. Ceferino Ruiz Rodríguez (1947–1953)
- 24. Miguel Angel Larrucea de la Mora (1953–1956)
- 25. Eduardo Martínez Márquez (1956–1959)
- 26. Daniel Baldor de la Vega(1959)
- 27. Ramón Calvo Hernández(1959–1961)

== Academics ==
Name	Class year	Notability	Reference(s)
Luis E. Aguilar Leon	1944	Writer and Professor Emeritus of Georgetown University	
Xavier Briggs	1985	Currently serving as Associate Director of the White House Office of Management and Budget under President Barack Obama; former senior policy official at the US Department of Housing and Urban Development under President Bill Clinton; Professor of Sociology and Urban Planning at the Massachusetts Institute of Technology (MIT), and a former faculty member of Harvard University’s Kennedy School of Government	
Jorge I. Dominguez	1963	Faculty member at Harvard University, Academy for International and Area Studies	
Alberto Martinez Piedra	1946	Former US Ambassador to Guatemala and Professor at The Institute of World Politics	
Salvador Miranda	1958	Church historian and librarian	

== Politicians, Cuba ==
Name	Class year	Notability	Reference(s)
Miguel Ángel de la Campa y Caraveda	1900	Cuban Foreign Minister, Attorney General, diplomat	
Fidel Castro	1944	Former president and prime minister of Cuba	
Raúl Castro	Attended	Former president and prime minister of Cuba	
Antonio Prío Socarrás	1923	Cuban Minister of Housing, 1948-1952	
Carlos Prío Socarrás	1921	16th President of Cuba	
Francisco Prío Socarrás	1920	Cuban Senator, 1944-1952	
Antonio Sánchez de Bustamante y Sirven	1883	Cuban Senator (1902–1918), author, and jurist (Judge of the Permanent Court of International Justice at the Hague (1922–1942), nominee for the Nobel Peace Prize of 1949	

== Scientists ==
Name	Class year	Notability	Reference(s)
Carlos Finlay	Faculty	Physician and epidemiologist; proposed the mode of transmission of yellow fever	

== Gallery ==
Images from the 1940s and 50s of the Colegio de Belen:

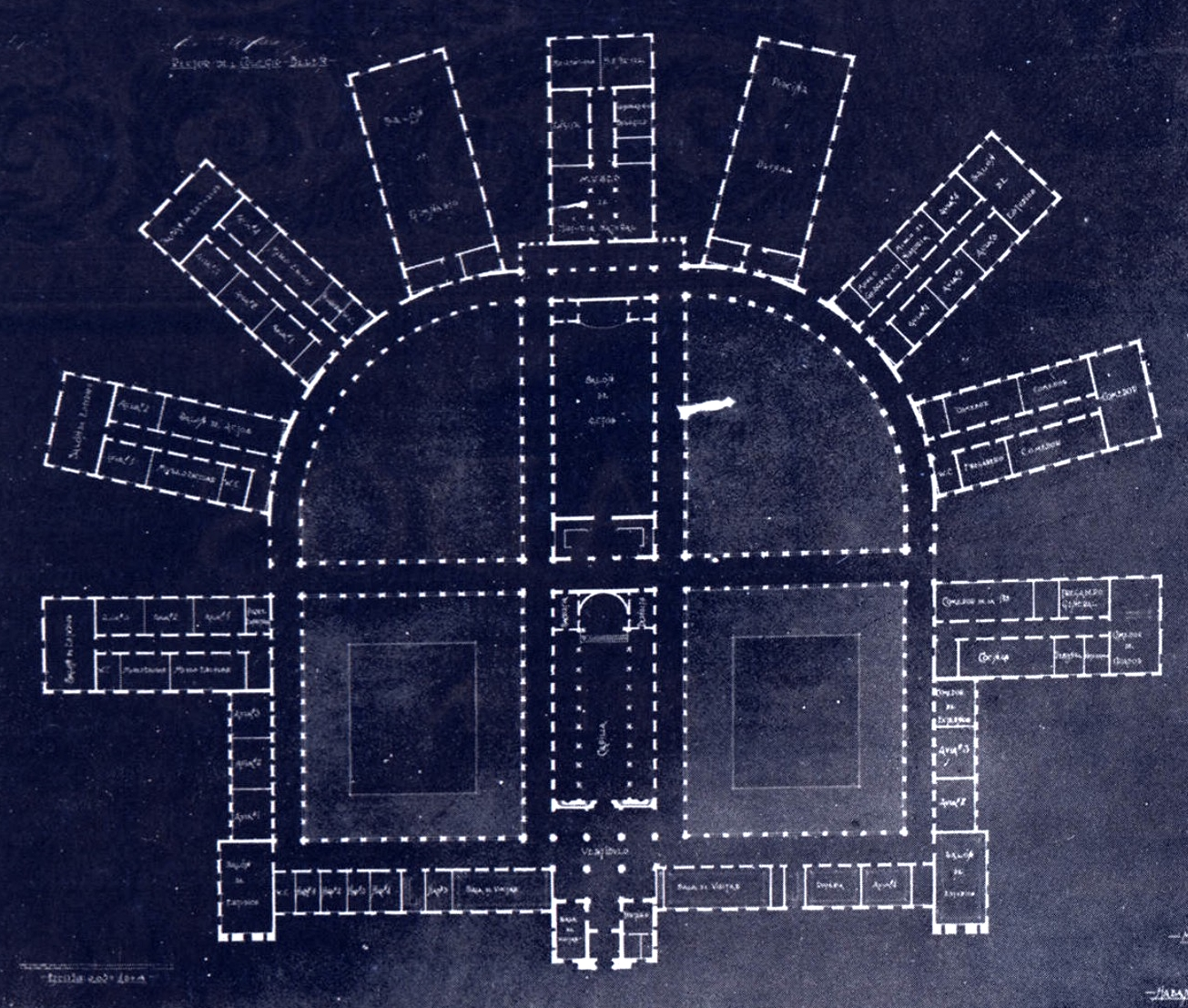
Colegio de Belen_Floor plan by Leonardo Morales y Pedroso, ca 1925.

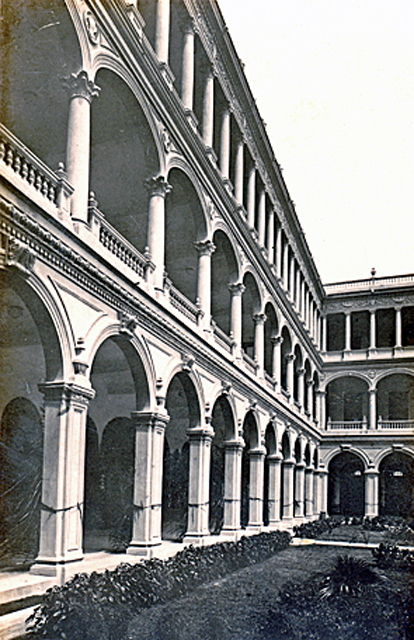
Courtyad, detail.

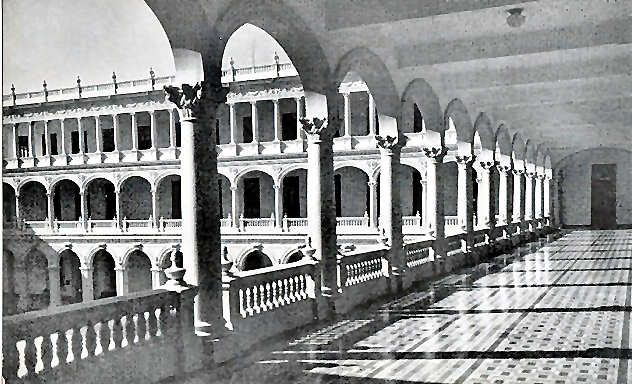
Hallways

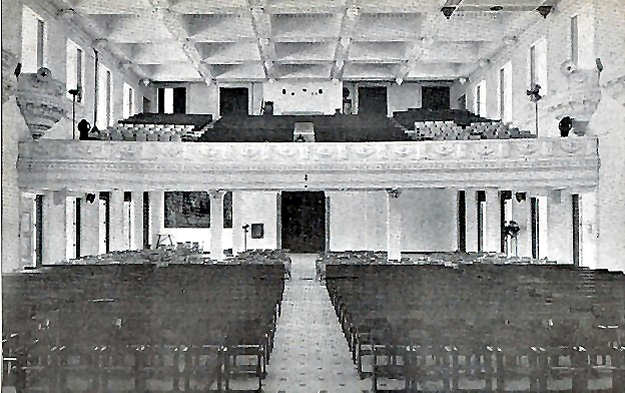
Auditorium

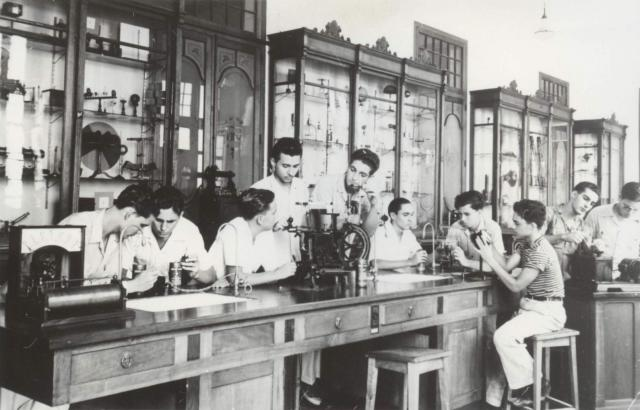
Fidel Castro, 2nd from left. ca. 1943.

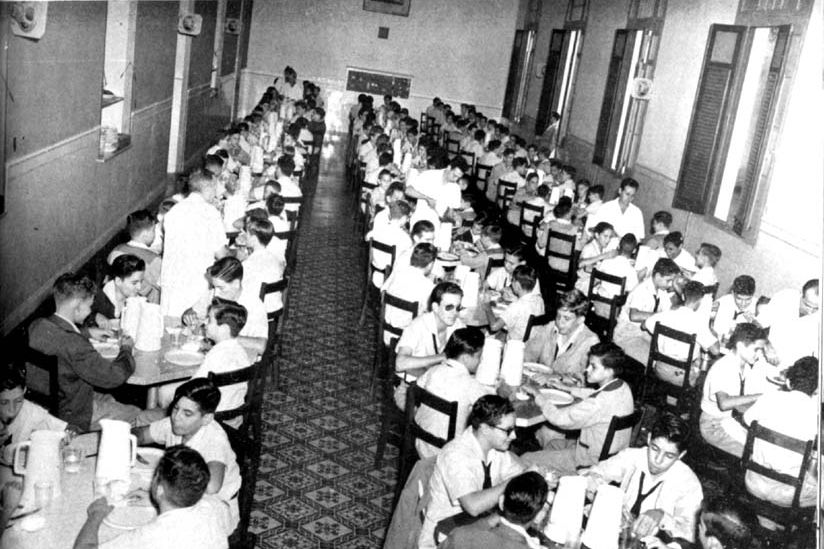
Lunch room

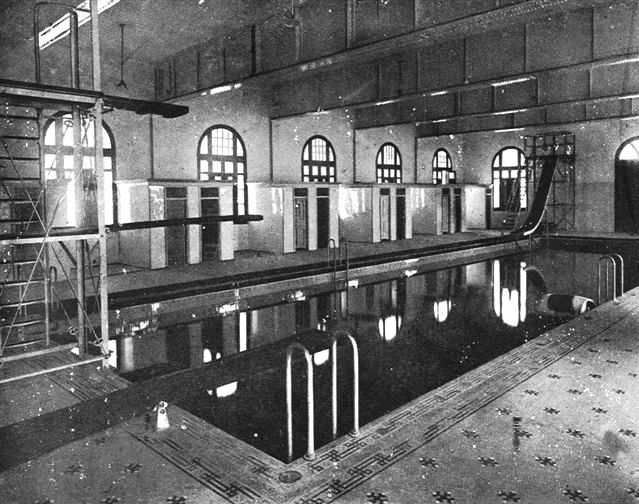
Swimming pool.

== See also ==
- Nuestra Señora de Belén
- Belen Jesuit Preparatory School
- List of Belen Jesuit Preparatory School people
- List of Jesuit sites
- Instituto Técnico Militar
- List of Belen Jesuit Preparatory School people*
- Leonardo Morales y Pedroso
- Tropicana Club

== Bibliography ==
- La Habana, Guia de Arquitectura, Maria Elena Zequeira & Eduardo Luis Rodriguez Fernandez, editors (Sevilla, Spain: A.G. Novograf, S.A., 1998) ISBN 84-8095-143-5 (in Spanish)
