= Henry Pollack =

Henry Pollack may refer to:

- Henry Pollack (broadcaster) (born 1961), Cuban-born American radio broadcaster
- Henry Pollack (geophysicist), professor of geophysics at the University of Michigan

== See also ==
- Henry Pollak (disambiguation)
