= Francisco Aruca =

Francisco Aruca (born Francisco Gonzalez y Aruca in 1941 in Artemisa, Cuba, died March 6, 2013, in Denver, Colorado) was a Cuban American radio host and businessman. Aruca in 1979 founded Marazul Tours, the largest travel agency that provides travel service from the United States to Cuba. He was also a radio host on Miami's "Radio Progreso", WOCN (1450). Aruca was the only child of Francisco Gonzalez and Lilia Aruca. He graduated from the Colegio de Belen in 1959. He later received his B.A. in Economics from Georgetown University and his M.A. from Catholic University.

== Biography ==
At the beginning of the Cuban Revolution, Aruca became involved with the Movimiento Revolucionario del Pueblo (MRP), an organization led by Manuel Ray, an architect who had served as Fidel Castro's minister of public works. Aruca was the propaganda director of the student wing, and distributed anti-revolutionary leaflets and to organize strikes. He was arrested on January 5, 1961, and charged with counterrevolutionary activities, tried ten days later, found guilty, and sentenced to 30 years. Aruca was sent to Havana's La Cabana prison. Since he was small and looked younger than 20 he was able to sneak out one day from prison pretending to be a visitor. He made his way to the Brazilian embassy and asked for asylum. He spent eighteen months there, until he was able to obtain a safe-conduct pass from the Cuban government. He went first to Ecuador, then to Colombia, and then to Miami.

In 1962, Miami was full of exile politics, and Aruca wanted to continue his studies. He asked for guidance from the Jesuits at Miami's Belen Jesuit Preparatory School, who told him about another Jesuit institution in Washington, D.C., Georgetown University. He got a job at the Madison Hotel as a bellboy and studied English. In September 1963, he entered Georgetown University with the help of a federal student loan program set up for Cuban refugees. He graduated in 1968 with over $10,000 in debts and a degree in economics. Aruca later received a master's degree in economics from Catholic University and completing all but his dissertation for a Ph.D.. In 1966 he married Anita Potts and they have three children.
