= Guillermo Aguilera Sanchez =

Cuban politician and businessman

Cuban Senator from Camagüey
- In office 1954 – Jan 1959
- Succeeded by: Position abolished

Personal details
- Born: 8 April 1901 Camagüey, Cuba
- Died: 25 September 1983 (aged 82) Palm Beach, Florida
- Spouse: Elena Pollack Casuso
- Occupation: Businessman

Guillermo Bernabe Aguilera y Sanchez (8 April 1901 in Camagüey, Cuba - 25 September 1983) was a Cuban politician and businessman.

Aguilera was a Senator from Camagüey from 1954 until 1959. He was one of the largest rice growers in Cuba. He was the owner of Finca San Antonio (Plantation San Antonio) which was 1000 caballerias (33,200 acres) with 600 caballerias (19,920 acres) dedicated to growing rice. In 1953, he purchased 1700 cabillarias (56,440 acres) for $750,000. He was also the owner of a rice mill company "Molino de Arroz, S.A.".

== Family ==
Aguilera was married to Elena Pollack Casuso (1911–1966), the daughter of Mark A. Pollack, a tobacco exporter. They had three children: Alina, Elena, and Guillermo Bernabe Aguillera-Pollack. He was the brother-in-law of the Mercedes de la Torre y Alcoz, Marquesa de Arcos and grand-uncle of the South Florida radio personality, Henry Pollack.
