= Roberto Suárez (publisher) =

Cuban-American newswriter & publisher (1928–2010)

Roberto J. Suárez de Cárdenas (March 5, 1928 – July 7, 2010) was the Cuban born American President of The Miami Herald and Publisher (founder) of El Nuevo Herald.

Suárez was born in Havana, Cuba, and was educated and graduated from the Colegio de Belén in 1946. He attended Villanova University and the University of Havana. He first went into exile in 1958 in connection with political activities against the regime of Cuban dictator Fulgencio Batista. Suarez fled Cuba permanently in 1961 after Fidel Castro came to power, arriving in Miami with just $5 in his pocket and a small duffel bag of clothes.

He started work in the mailroom at The Miami Herald loading newspapers in distribution trucks and inserting supplements by hand into the body of the paper. He subsequently worked his way up and left the Herald to become general manager of the Charlotte Observer in the 1970s. He returned to Miami and the Herald, continuing to work his way up until he became the president of the Miami Herald Publishing Co. In 1987, he started El Nuevo Herald, the Miami Herald's Spanish-language daily, with a separate staff that wrote in Spanish. He retired in 1995 as both the Herald's president emeritus and the publisher of El Nuevo Herald.

Suárez was the son of Miguel Amado Suarez-de Leon (the owner of the Gran Stadium del Cerro) and Esperanza de Cardenas-Carricaburu, and was married to Miriam Campuzano. They had twelve children, Roberto (born 1952), Miriam, Elena, Antonio (died 2007), Miguel, Carlos, Armando (1958 – 2007), Raul, Maria Teresa, Gonzalo, Esperanza, and Ana Maria.
