= La Mansión =

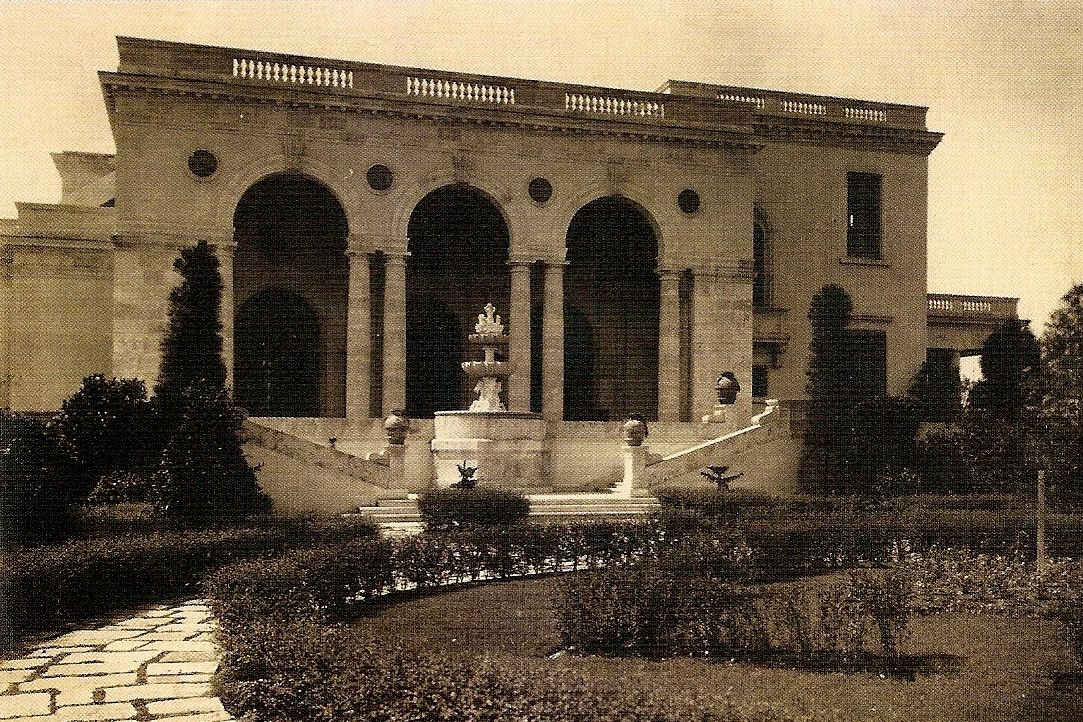

General information
- Coordinates: 23.0800°N 82.4542°W
- Owner: Revolutionary government (contested) (Note: This theft of private property led the U.S. into severing diplomatic relations in 1961 and installing the trade embargo and various sanctions against Cuba. "Thousands of Americans and Cuban citizens suffered humiliation and financial distresses of having their private property stolen from them, some of them at gunpoint. Today there has been no justice for that their claims.")

La Mansión de Mark Pollack is a neo-classical, Florentine mansion in the Cubanacan Section (aka the Country Club section) of Havana, Cuba built in 1930 by the Cuban architect Leonardo Morales y Pedroso (1887–1965). It is located at 21st street #15001, Cubanacan, Havana, Cuba. It was built for Mark Alexander Pollack (1874–1946), the son of Alexander Pollack and Belle A. Rothschild (1848-1936), the American-born patriarch of a wealthy Cuban tobacco exporter. The house covers an area of 13,000 square meters.

Ground floor sitting room showing partial ceiling and frieze.

== Architecture ==
Sitting room.

The mansion is constructed in large part of coral stone. (Note: Many buildings in Havana are constructed out of coral stone including the Colegio Nacional de Arquitectos de Cuba, the promenade of El Prado, the Havana Cathedral, and the San Carlos and San Ambrosio Seminary. Some of the exterior walls on the ground floor of the FOCSA Building of 1956 are covered with approximately 12" square coral stone tiles.), it has large rooms and is surrounded by extensive gardens. Pollack commissioned a series of panels referring to the discovery of the Americas which were placed around the main hall, but due to their deteriorated state when the Cuban government decided to restore the mansion at a cost of 2 million dollars in the 1990s, were lost.

The hall is large due to its proportions (approximately 15 metres (49 ft) long and 7.3 metres (24 ft) in width and height), the organ takes up one end and the balcony at half the height of the room, the other end; the iron grill leads to the portico, the main element of the facade facing the garden.

The portico has a triple arcade supported by double columns and a decorated and arched ceiling. The central courtyard is exceptional for Cuban house architecture in the 20th century, due to its size and the fact that it is completely surrounded by a porticoed gallery, the columns of which are of different kinds of marble on both floors.

== Political refugees ==
Pollack's family abandoned La Mansion and Cuba in 1960, they moved to Florida as political refugees of the Castro government.

== Promotion ==
The mansion has been featured in Architectural Digest, Six Days in Havana by James A. Michener, in Maria Luisa Lobo Montalvo's "Havana", as the cover picture for Michael Connors' book "Cuban Elegance", as the cover photo for "I Was Cuba: Treasures from the Ramiro Fernandez Collection" by Kevin Kwan, and is featured in dozens of other books celebrating Cuban architecture.

The property was leased to the Brazilian Embassy until Brazil broke relations with the Castro government, after which it was abandoned and allowed to deteriorate. In the 1990s, it was restored at a cost of over $2,000,000 and is now rented by the Cuban government for its important guests.

== See also ==
- Instituto Técnico Militar
- Leonardo Morales y Pedroso

== Bibliography ==
- Inside Cuba (Taschen, Spain 2006 ISBN 3-8228-4597-3)
- Havana, Cuba: An Architectural Guide (A.G. Novograf, S.A., 1998, ISBN 84-8095-143-5)
- Cuban Elegance (Harry N. Abrams, 2004, ISBN 0-8109-4337-9)
- Havana: History and Architecture of a Romantic City (Monacelli Press, 2000, ISBN 1-58093-052-2)
- La Habana Arquitectura del Siglo XX, Eduardo Luis Rodriguez (Blume, 2001) ISBN 978-84-89396-17-3 (in Spanish)
