= Henry Pollack (broadcaster) =

American broadcaster (born 1961)

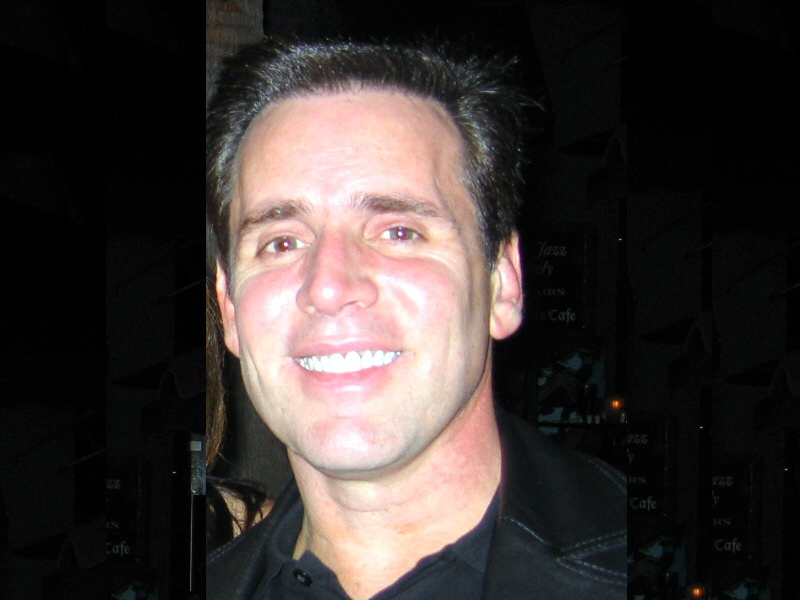
- Born: Enrique Alberto Pollack-Aguilar; February 1961 (age 64); Havana, Cuba
- Occupation: Radio personality

Henry Pollack (born Enrique Alberto Pollack-Aguilar; in February 1961, in Havana, Cuba) is the Cuban born American host and founder of "Havana Rock," a radio program that has been on the air since May 1995, the Miami, Florida show on radio station WWFE 670 AM and has enjoyed a cult following since it first aired in 1995. The show has received much praise for its staunch anti-Communist stance and has been featured on CNN, BBC, ABC and Fox News. It is also the only radio show in South Florida that is completely bilingual. He is also the editor of an anti-Fidel Castro web sites on the net, (Cubaweb-Havana Rock) which went online in 1998 as one of the first anti-Castro websites on the internet.

== Early life ==
Pollack is the eldest of three children born to Enrique A. Pollack-Diehl and Dolores "Loly" Aguilar-Perna, both from very prestigious families. His mother is closely related to Santiago Rey Perna, signatory of the Cuban Constitution of 1940, and his father is related to the Rothschild banking family as well as being the nephew of the Duchess of Seville, María Luisa de la Torre y Bassave. Her heirs and the Pollacks are related to the current King of Spain, Juan Carlos de Borbon. He attended Pater Noster Preparatory School in Los Angeles, CA, University High School in West Los Angeles, CA, Miami Dade Community College, and Florida International University. He is also the firstborn great-grandson of Mark A. Pollack (1874–1946), the American-born patriarch of a wealthy Cuban tobacco dynasty and owner of the famous "La Mansion", a neo-classical mansion in the Cubanacan Section (aka Country Club section) of Havana built in 1930 by the Cuban architect, Leonardo Morales y Pedroso (1887–1965).

== Politics and Recent Events ==
Pollack often appears on television shows due to his anti-Castro stance.

On April 16, 2004, the Cuban government officially protested to the United Nations about Pollack's actions in Geneva, after he placed posters protesting human rights violations in Cuba next to Communist Cuban posters on display in the main hall of the Human Rights Section of the United Nations Building in Geneva.

Pollack was a congressional aide to Republican Congresswoman Ileana Ros-Lehtinen from 1993 to 2006. He has also edited and produced two films, "Cuba Before Castro" and "The elegance that was Cuba before the Revolution". Both films have received hundreds of thousands of hits on YouTube and show a very different Cuba in the rare and vintage footage. His show, Havana Rock, can be heard every Thursday night at 11 PM EST on 670 AM in Miami or via the web at http://www.lapoderosa.com.

== Sources ==
- La Habana, Guia de Arquitectura, Maria Elena Zequeira & Eduardo Luis Rodriguez Fernandez, editors (Sevilla, Spain: A.G. Novograf, S.A., 1998) ISBN 84-8095-143-5 (in Spanish)
- Historia de Familias Cubanas (Ediciones Universal, Miami, Florida 1985 ISBN 0-89729-380-0)
- The Miami Herald (by Jennifer Miller) July 25, 2001
- The Miami Herald - July 25, 2001 - "E-Mail Virus Arrives In Message Purportedly From Cuba"
- The Miami Herald - August 25, 1998 - "Cuban Musicians Face Protest"
- The Miami Herald - August 22, 1995 - "Reaching Cuba With Rock'n'Roll"
- El Nuevo Herald - October 18, 1996 - "Radio Rebelde Y Emisora Del Exilio Unen Fuerzas Para Emergencia De Ciclon"
- El Nuevo Herald - May 19, 2000 - "Henry Polack: Vehemencia Alternativa"
- El Nuevo Herald - September 23, 1996 - "Radio De Cuba Rehusa Debate Radial Con Miami"
- El Nuevo Herald - August 22, 1995 - "Havana Rock: Nueva Ondas De Libertad Radial A Cuba"
- Miami New Times, May 13, 2007
- St. Petersburg Times - September 23, 1996 - "Silence greets effort to discuss Cuba"
- Los Propietarios de Cuba 1958, Guillermo Jimenez Soler (Havana, Cuba: Editorial de Ciencias Sociales, 2007) (in Spanish)
