= Luis E. Aguilar Leon =

Cuban journalist, professor and historian

- Born: 1926; Manzanillo, Cuba
- Died: January 5, 2008 (aged 81–82); Key Biscayne, Florida, United States

Luis Enrique Aguilar Leon, J.D., Ph.D. (1926 in Manzanillo, Cuba - January 5, 2008, in Key Biscayne, Florida, United States) was a Cuban journalist, professor and historian. He was a professor to Bill Clinton and a classmate of Fidel Castro.

== Education ==
Aguilar was educated by the Jesuits first at the Colegio de Dolores in Santiago de Cuba and then at the Colegio de Belén in Havana. Fidel Castro was his classmate at both schools. They both graduated in 1944 from Belén. Aguilar graduated from the University of Havana Law School in 1949 and Castro in 1950. In 1950, Aguilar earned a degree in international relations from the Complutense University of Madrid in Spain. Later, while in exile, he would earn a Ph.D. from American University in Washington, D.C.

== Cuban revolution ==
When he returned from Spain, he taught for a time at the Universidad de Oriente - Santiago de Cuba, but then went to Havana to practice law. He was also a political writer for the newspaper Prensa Libre and the magazines Bohemia and Carteles. Aguilar was also the director of Universidad del Aire (University of the Air) on the radio network CMQ.

He was one of the founders of the Christian Democrat movement, which was banned once Castro took power.

In 1960, Aguilar wrote an article entitled “It’s Time for Unanimity” which was a denunciation of censorship in Cuba. The Committee of Revolutionary Freedom flagged the article and requested that the government execute Aguilar. He then went into exile.

== Exile ==
Aguilar was a professor at Columbia University, Cornell University and finally for three decades at Georgetown University. Bill Clinton was one of his students. He retired from Georgetown in 1992 with the title professor emeritus. In 2003, Georgetown University created a scholarship named after him.

Aguilar then moved to South Florida and taught at the University of Miami until 2002. In 1988, he founded the Emilio Bacardi Moreau Chair on Cuban Studies at the University of Miami.

He was involved with Radio Marti since its inception in 1985 and was the Director of the Opinion Section of El Nuevo Herald from 1993 to 1995.

== Family and death ==
Aguilar suffered the last years of his life with Alzheimer’s disease. He died on January 5, 2008, in his home at Key Biscayne, Florida. Aguilar was married to Vera Mestre y Fernández Mascaró and they had three children, Jorge Augusto, Elizabeth Ann and Luis Enrique Aguilar, Jr. Aguilar’s older brother was Juan F. Aguilar León, Professor Emeritus of Drake University School of Law.
