= Terry Karl =

American academic

- Born: Terry Lynn Karl; November 21, 1947 (age 78); St. Louis, Missouri, U.S.
- Education: Stanford University (B.A. 1970; M.A. 1976; Ph.D. with Special Distinction 1982)
- Occupation: Professor
- Employer: Stanford University
- Title: Gildred Professor of Latin American Studies and Professor of Political Science
- Awards: Dean's Award for Excellence in Teaching (1989); Allan V. Cox Medal for Faculty Excellence Fostering Undergraduate Research (1994); Walter J. Gores Award for Excellence in Graduate and Undergraduate Teaching (1997); Rio Branco Prize

Terry Lynn Karl (born November 21, 1947) is the Gildred Professor of Latin American Studies and Professor of Political Science at Stanford University. She specializes in comparative politics.

== Early life and academics ==
Karl was born in St. Louis, Missouri. Karl's parents, Irene E. Karl (1915–2006; the first woman to earn a doctorate in biochemistry from the University of Wisconsin and the first female scientist to receive the Jewish Federation of St. Louis Woman of Valor Award) and Michael M. Karl (1915–2006), married in 1940 and were both professors of medicine at Washington University School of Medicine in St. Louis. She has a sister, Bonnie Karl Staffier. She has lived in Noe Valley, San Francisco, California, since 1986.

Karl attended John Burroughs School in Ladue, Missouri, graduating in 1966. She received a B.A. from Stanford University (1970), an M.A. from Stanford University in political science (1976), and a Ph.D. with Special Distinction from Stanford University in political science (1982). Karl was granted a Doctor of Humane Letters, honoris causa, from the University of San Francisco in 2005.

== Academia ==
From 1982 to 1985, Karl was an assistant professor in the Department of Government at Harvard University. During that time, she brought a sexual harassment complaint against Harvard Professor Jorge I. Domínguez, the senior Latin American scholar in the department. This was a decade before similar allegations gained national prominence during the Clarence Thomas confirmation hearings. In 1983, Domínguez was disciplined by Harvard's administration for "serious conduct" for sexually harassing her. In February 2021 Harvard apologized to Karl for failing to adequately enforce sanctions against Domínguez in her sexual harassment complaint against him, saying: “We all owe Dr. Karl a debt of gratitude for doing the right thing, especially when it was difficult, and for being persistent in her efforts to demand justice."

Karl moved to Stanford University in 1987, where she served as director of Stanford's Center for Latin American Studies from 1990 to 2002. Karl is the Gildred Professor of Latin American Studies and Professor of Political Science in the Political Science Department at Stanford University.

She won the Dean's Award for Excellence in Teaching (1989), the Allan V. Cox Medal for Faculty Excellence Fostering Undergraduate Research (1994), the Walter J. Gores Award for Excellence in Graduate and Undergraduate Teaching (1997; the university's highest academic prize), and was given the Rio Branco Prize by Brazil President Fernando Henrique Cardoso in recognition of her service in fostering academic relations between the United States and Latin America.

== Scholarship ==
She is the author of The Paradox of Plenty: Oil Booms and Petro-States (University of California Press, 1998). It was named one of the two best books on Latin America by the Latin American Studies Association. [15] Its central idea of a political resource curse “was recognized by Time Magazine as one of “ten ideas that are changing our world.” She also co-authored Limits of Competition (MIT Press, 1996; which won the Twelve Stars Environmental Prize from the European Community), co-authored with Ian Gary The Bottom of the Barrel: Africa's Oil Boom and the Poor (2004), is co-author with Mary Kaldor and Yahia Said of the forthcoming New and Old Oil Wars, and is co-author with Joseph Stiglitz, Jeffrey Sachs, and others of the forthcoming Overcoming the Resource Curse. Her writings have been translated into 15 languages.

Karl is also known as for her work on transitions from authoritarian rule and comparative democratization, introducing the concepts of” pact-making,” “modes of transitions” “electoralism”, and “hybrid regimes” into this literature. Her work in this area was recognized by winning the Latin American Studies Association Guillermo O’Donnell prize.

Karl uses political science methods and the legal concept of so-called command responsibility, to investigate human rights cases. She has worked as an expert witness in the United States, Europe, and Latin America. In these roles, she has provided testimony for the U.S. Department of Justice, the Department of Homeland Security, and various national courts in Latin America.

Her research and testimonies were central in the case of the U’wa indigenous people in their successful and path-breaking 2002 lawsuit in Colombia against Occidental Petroleum. Other testimonies have helped to set important legal precedents, e.g., Karl was cited extensively in rulings that resulted in the first jury verdict in U.S. history against foreign military commanders living in the U.S. for murder and torture under the doctrine of command responsibility(Romagoza et al. v Garcia/Vides Casanova) and the first jury verdict in U.S. history finding commanders responsible for “crimes against humanity” under the doctrine of command responsibility (Chavez et al. v Carranza). Karl has presented hundreds of written to the U.S. Supreme Court, the U.S. Attorney General, U.S. Circuit courts, and U.S. immigration courts for political asylum seekers.

Transitions from Authoritarian Rule and Problems of Democratization: Karl's most recent book on democratization, Extreme Inequality and State Capture: The Crisis of Democracy in the United States (in English, Spanish and Chinese, 2019), assesses the lessons from Latin America and elsewhere for the United States in the Trump era. She has published extensively on Latin American Politics, especially about the Andean oil countries and Central America. She extended her early work on transitions from authoritarian rule (and back) to problems of comparative democratization, first introducing the concepts of” pact-making,” “ modes of transitions” “electoralism”, and “hybrid regimes.” Her article with Philippe Schmitter, “What Democracy Is and Is Not,” is one of the most frequently cited in political science. Since 2019, she has been writing on problems of U.S. democracy. Karl has served as both informal and formal advisor to the U.N. Assistant Secretary General during peace negotiations in El Salvador and Guatemala and the House Foreign Affairs Committee, especially Inter-American Affairs. She has testified before Congress regarding U.S. policy towards Latin America and the politics of global oil.

Crimes Against Humanity, Transitional Justice and Human Rights: A pioneer in using political science methodologies as investigative techniques as well as the doctrine of command responsibility in war crimes, crimes against humanity and human rights trial, Karl serves as the expert witness in criminal, civil and administrative trials against direct human rights abusers or other actors charged with facilitating abuses. She has testified on war crimes or crimes against humanity in trials based in the United States for the Department of Justice and the War Crimes Unit and for governments or NGOs in Europe, Central America, and Colombia. These trials include, among others: the massacre of El Mozote, Latin America's largest contemporary massacre (San Francisco Gotera, El Salvador), the murder of El Salvador's Archbishop (and now Catholic Saint) Oscar Romero (Fresno, Ca.), the 1989 murders of six Jesuit priests and two women in the Central American University (Audiencia Nacional, Madrid, Spain), and numerous massacres in Latin America. These trials have set important legal precedents due to her testimony. For example, Karl was cited extensively in rulings that resulted in the first jury verdict in U.S. history against foreign military commanders living in the U.S. for murder and torture under the doctrine of command responsibility (Romagoza et al. v Garcia/Vides Casanova) and the first jury verdict in U.S. history finding commanders responsible for “crimes against humanity” under the doctrine of command responsibility (Chavez et al. v Carranza). Her most recent trial work can be found here: https://scrippsnews.com/stories/exclusive-ice-arrests-salvadoran-man-wanted-for-war-crimes/ and Colombia: https://www.courthousenews.com/11th-circuit-revives-lawsuits-accusing-chiquita-of-funding-colombian-terrorists and https://www.democracynow.org/2024/12/23/headlines/uwa_indigenous_people_in_colombia_win_major_victory_at_inter_american_court_of_human_rights Karl's testimonies (in the hundreds) regarding political asylum and temporary protected status (TPS) have been presented to the U.S. Supreme Court, the U.S. Attorney General, U.S. Circuit courts, and U.S. immigration courts. She has documented well over 50 massacres for use in Latin America and European cases.

== Selected publications ==
- Schmitter, P. C., & Karl, T. L. (1991). What democracy is... and is not. Journal of Democracy, 2(3), 75–88.
- Karl, T. L. (1990). Dilemmas of democratization in Latin America. Comparative Politics, 23(1), 1–21.
- Karl, T. L., & Schmitter, P. C. (1991). Modes of transition in Latin America, southern and eastern Europe. International Social Science Journal, 128(2), 267–282.
- Karl, T. L. (1995). The hybrid regimes of Central America. Journal of Democracy, 6(3), 72–86.
- Karl, T. L. (1997 ). The paradox of plenty: Oil booms and petro-states. Oakland, CA: University of California Press.
