= Arco de Belén, Havana =

Tunnel in Old Havana

Arco de Belén
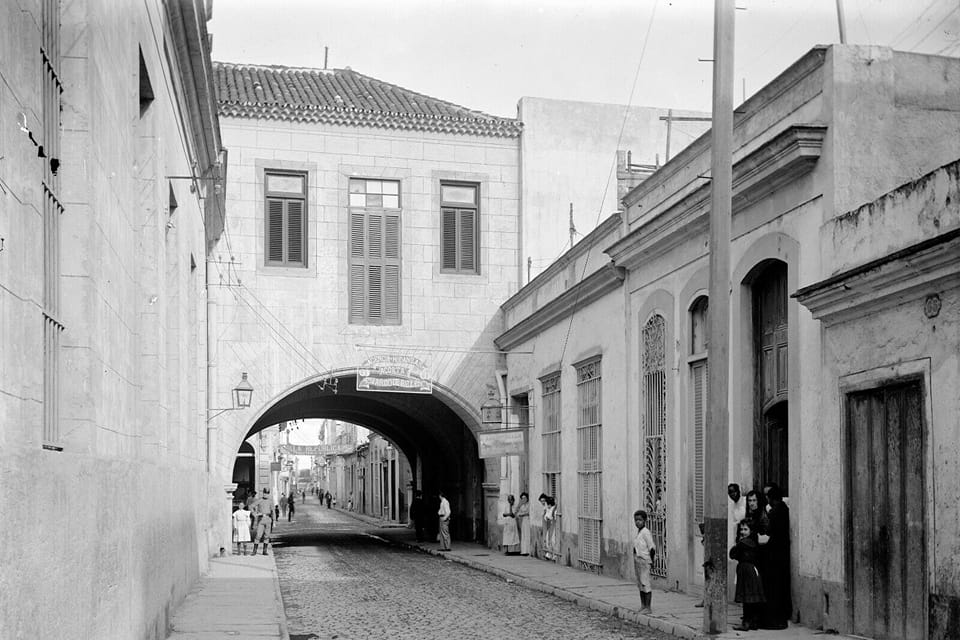
- view from the west, ca 1921
- Interactive map of the Arco de Belén area

General information
- Location: No. 307 Calle Acosta, Havana, Cuba
- Coordinates: 23.1323°N 82.3526°W
- Opened: 1772 - 1775

Height
- Top floor: 8 meters

Technical details
- Structural system: Arch
- Floor count: 1

Design and construction
- Known for: Acosta street passage

The Arco de Belén is a historic arch in Havana, Cuba. It was built by master builder Pedro de Medina between 1772 and 1775, as an addition to connect the convent and church of Nuestra Señora de Belén located on Calle Acosta, which was originally constructed between 1718 and 1720.

The Belen Jesuit Preparatory School was located in the convent from the mid 19th century until they relocated to Marianao in 1925. After the Jesuit school vacated the convent, the building became state-owned. In 1988, the Cuban Academy of Sciences was based in the convent, while the rest of the building was abandoned. The Arco de Belén underwent significant restoration efforts alongside the convent in the 1980s.

== Gallery ==
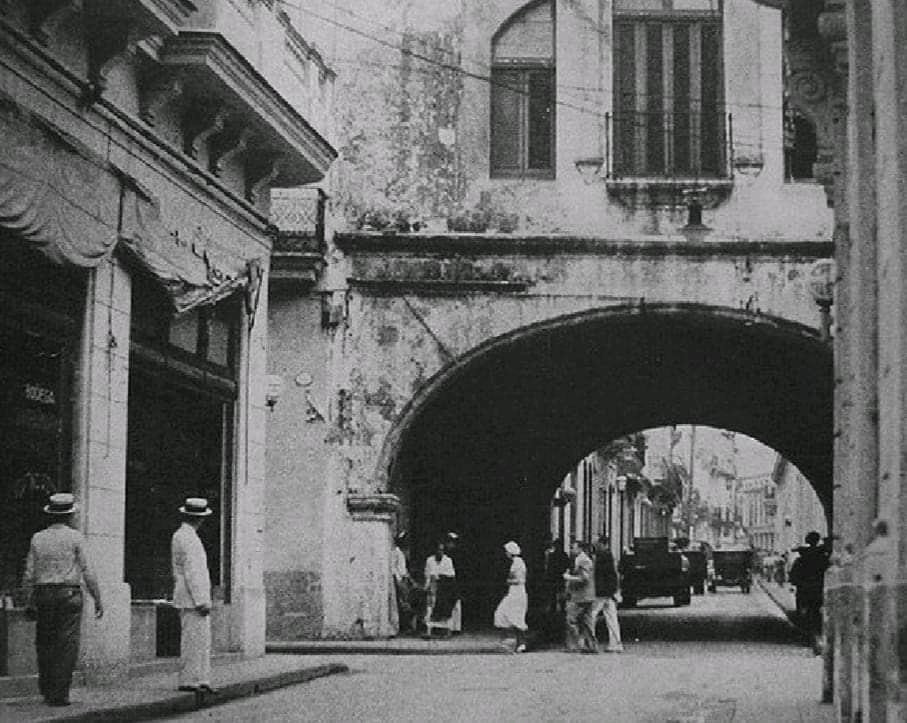
Arco de Belén, Front facade, 1920

== See also ==
- Old Havana
- Royal Shipyard of Havana
- Colegio de Belén, Havana
- Havana
