= Michael Sayman =

Latin American internet entrepreneur (born 1996)

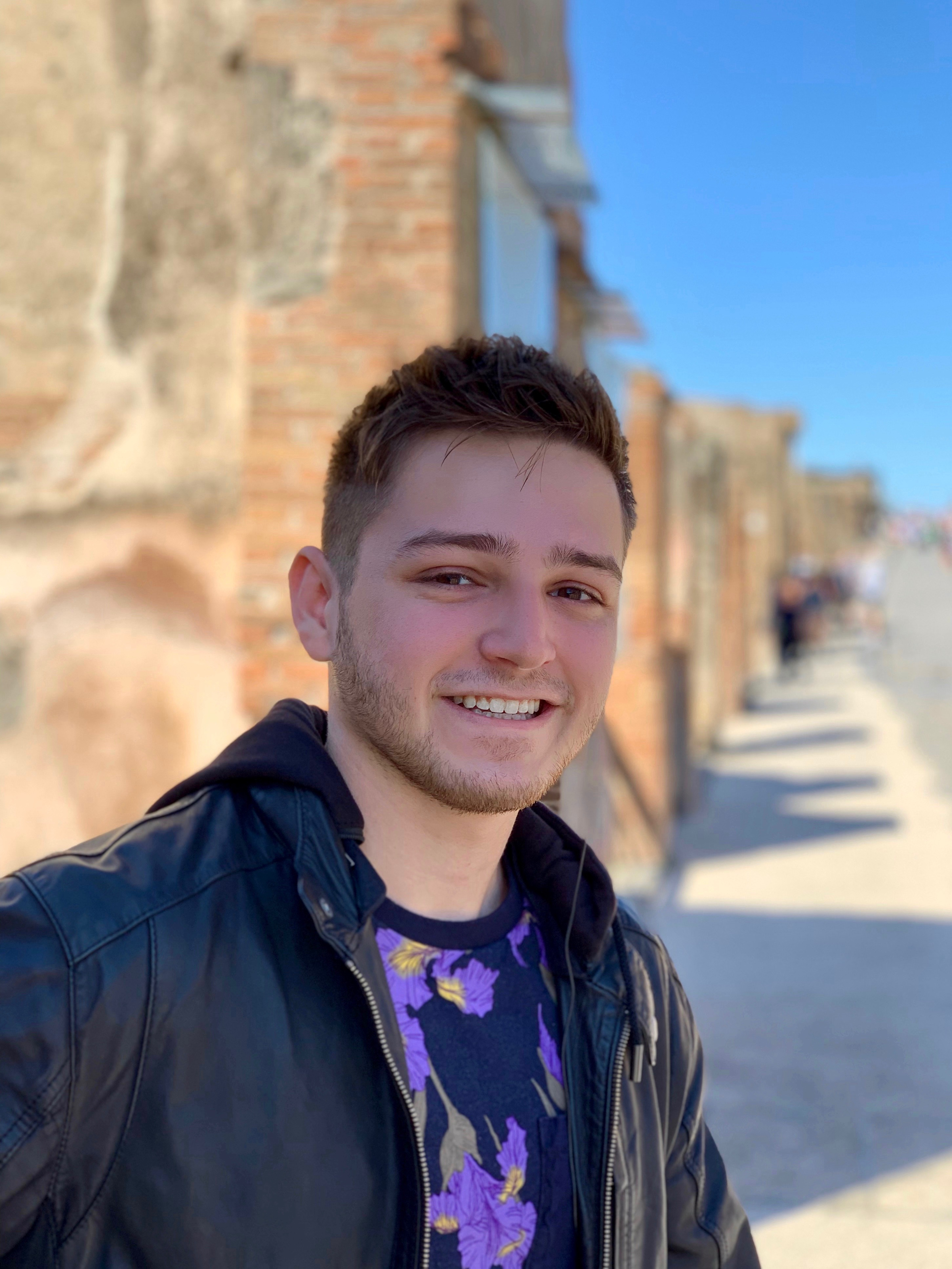
- Sayman in 2019
- Born: August 24, 1996 (age 30); Miami, Florida, U.S.
- Occupations: mobile application entrepreneur, author
- Notable work: 4 Snaps; Instagram Stories; App Kid: How a Child of Immigrants Grabbed a Piece of the American Dream

Michael Arthur Sayman (born August 24, 1996), is a Peruvian–Bolivian–American mobile application entrepreneur, software engineer, political activist, and author. He is best known for creating top-charting apps as a teenager to provide for his family during the Great Recession, as well as his subsequent work at Facebook. Described by Semana as "the most influential Latino in Silicon Valley", in 2019, Sayman was included on Forbes's 30 Under 30 list, and has additionally been featured at TED.

Sayman published his first app to the App Store (iOS) when he was 13 years old. He later gained recognition from Mark Zuckerberg with his launch of 4 Snaps, a turn-based photo game, in his junior year of high school. Zuckerberg then hired Sayman, becoming Facebook's "teen-in-residence" at 18, taking part in the creation of Instagram Stories. His success with mobile application development grew in his teenage years, generating millions in revenue as a high school student. At age 18, he was described by CNET as one of the 20 Latinos with the biggest influence in the tech industry.

== Personal life ==
Michael was born in Miami, Florida in 1996 to Bolivian father Miguel Sayman and Peruvian mother Maria Cristina Gálvez Sayman. A large part of his life is defined by effects the Great Recession had on his childhood.

In 2010, when Sayman was 13 years old, his parents lost their jobs and were forced to foreclose their home. His mother considered having them move back to Peru. Sayman insisted they remain in the United States, and that he would pay for everything. Throughout his adolescence, he provided for his family via the money he earned publishing apps on the App Store. In an interview with People magazine regarding his teenage years, Sayman said there were moments in which he did not know how his family would be able to afford to buy food or pay the electricity bill.

In 2014, as tech companies were flying Sayman out to tour their campuses and speak at conferences, he still owed tuition to Belen Jesuit Preparatory School, the private high school he attended. The school refused to give him his graduation certificate due to his inability to pay the outstanding balance he owed.

In August 2018, Sayman publicly came out as gay in an interview with People en Español. He said in the interview that he chose to come out because he believed that "this will be able to help other Latinos who go through the same situation."

== Programming career ==
=== Early career ===
Sayman taught himself programming through tutorials he found via Google.

In 2013, Sayman developed an app named "4 Snaps", a turn-based game that gave the user a choice of words, allowed them to take four pictures based on the word they picked, and then sent over to the opponent player to guess what the word was, based on the pictures taken. He released the app on August 8, 2013 and by the following year, the app had over one million downloads.

4 Snaps was received with mostly positive reviews. It peaked at No. 1 on the word games chart with a few million users.

=== Facebook (2014–17) ===
Sayman joined Facebook when he was 18. Mentored by Mark Zuckerberg, Sayman played a role within the company as the social network's "go-to teen" and as its "teen-in-residence" according to TED. Over the course of 3 years at the company, he worked on developing products for the teenage demographic. He helped the social-media company understand how his generation uses technology, advising on experimental products for teens and helping executives understand trends.

While working at Facebook, he launched Lifestage, a standalone, video-centric social app for high school students. The app was largely focused on the teenage demographic; anyone 22 or older is locked into only being able to see their own profile. When users signed up, with no need for a Facebook account, they would select their high school, and then see the video profiles from people at their school or ones nearby. Sayman released the app on August 19, 2016, for iOS devices in the United States. The app was met with criticism regarding its privacy model and compared to Snapchat and Yik Yak. Facebook pulled Lifestage from the app store and shut it down on August 4, 2017. Sayman left Facebook that same month.

=== Google ===
Sayman joined Google to work on its 'Assistant' project. Sayman worked on building a social-gaming startup within Google as part of the company's effort to create offspring companies from within the internet-search conglomerate.

At age 22 in 2019, Sayman's work at Google led to him being chosen to be on Forbes's 30 Under 30 list, a prestigious list of successful professionals under the age of 30. His entry on the list notes his experience as Facebook and his work on Google's "Assistant" function.

=== Post-Google (2020–) ===
In 2020, Sayman left his role at Google to join Roblox, a video game platform. Sayman has been described by Semana as "the most influential Latino in Silicon Valley". A memoir by Sayman, App Kid, that details his upbringing and family life was released in September 2021.

In 2022, microblogging platform Twitter hired Sayman to work in a product group called "0–1", focused on new features geared toward younger users. Also during this year, Sayman launched a new startup, Friendly Apps, which raised over $3 million from seed investors.

In 2024, Sayman developed and released a new app, News Ticker, for the Apple Vision Pro. The app went on to become number one in the "News" category among apps sold on the App Store. That same year, Meta brought Sayman's SocialAI team on board, where he became a part of Meta's Super Intelligence Labs.

In 2026, Sayman left Meta to join Whop.com as President of Product Ecosystems.
