= Henry Pollak =

Henry Pollak or Polak may refer to:

- Henry Polak (1882–1959), British humanist
- Henri Polak (1868–1943), Dutch trade unionist and politician
- Henry O. Pollak (1927–2026), Austrian-American mathematician

== See also ==
- Henry Pollack (disambiguation)
