= Mark A. Pollack =

Mark Alexander Pollack (26 April 1874 in Omaha, Nebraska – 1 November 1946 in Havana, Cuba) was one of the largest exporters of Cuban tobacco, a painter, and the owner of "La Mansion".

In the 1910s, he founded the firm "Pollack y Compania, S.A." (Pollack & Company, S.A.), a tobacco exporting company, which he ran until his death in 1946. His son, Roberto succeeded him as president. Pollack also served for many years as the President of the Leaf Tobacco Dealers and Growers of Cuba Association.

Pollack was the third of five children and son of Alexander Pollack (1837–?) and Belle A. Rothschild (1848–1936). He was married to Maria del Carmen Casuso y Ollea (1879–1946) and they had three children:

- Elena Pollack married to Guillermo Aguilera y Sanchez, Senator from Camagüey;
- Mark Pollack (1903–1986) married to Mercedes de la Torre y Alcoz;
- Roberto Pollack y Casuso, married to Marie Diehl de la Torre. Roberto and Marie had three children, Robert Pollack Jr., Mark Pollack and Enrique Pollack. Enrique Pollack had three children, Henry Pollack, one of Mark's great-grandsons and a well-known South Florida radio host; Alfred J. Pollack, and Barbra M. Pollack.

Mark Hermann Pollack, married Gloria Maria Del Río, they had two children Eileen Gloria Pollack and Dr. Mark Alexander Pollack.
