= Xavier Briggs =

American sociologist and policy reformer

Xavier de Souza Briggs
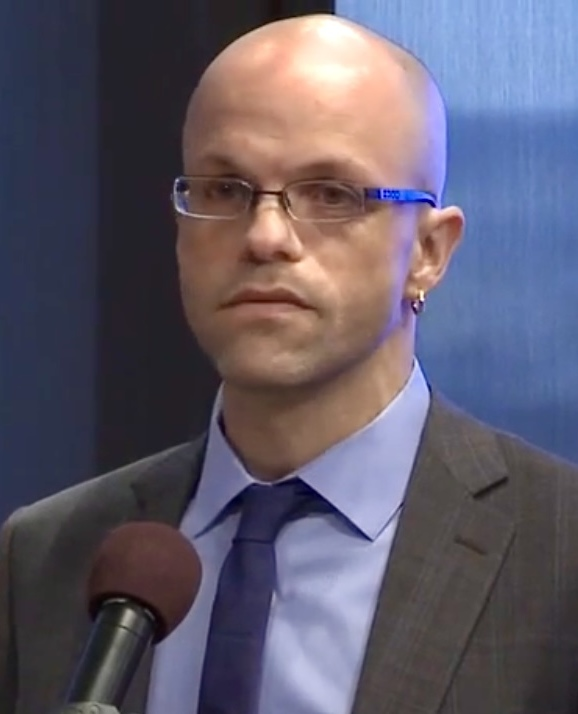
- Briggs in 2014
- Born: 1968 (age 57–58); Miami, Florida, U.S.
- Education: Stanford University; Harvard University; Columbia University
- Spouse: Cynthia
- Scientific career
- Workplaces: Massachusetts Institute of Technology
- Doctoral advisor: Robert Crain
- Other academic advisors: Herbert Gans

Xavier de Souza Briggs (born 1968) is an American educator, social scientist, and policy expert, known for his work on economic opportunity, social capital, democratic governance, and leading social change. He has influenced housing and urban policy in the United States, contributing to the concept of the "geography of opportunity," which examines the consequences of housing segregation.

Briggs has taught at Harvard University from 1996 to 2005, at the Massachusetts Institute of Technology (MIT) from 2005 to 2014, and from 2019 to 2021 at New York University (NYU). He served as a political appointee (senior policy adviser) to Presidents Bill Clinton and Barack Obama. From 2014 to 2019, he served as Vice President of Inclusive Economies and Markets and later U.S. Programs at the Ford Foundation. He has been a senior fellow at Brookings, the policy think tank since 2021. Briggs is also an elected fellow of the American Academy of Political and Social Science and the National Academy of Public Administration.

== Professional life ==
In New York City, Briggs helped develop the widely emulated "quality-of-life" planning approach to neighborhood revitalization, and in 1996 his work with the Comprehensive Community Revitalization Program in the South Bronx won the President's Award of the American Planning Association. He began his teaching career at Harvard in 1996, took a leave to work in the Clinton Administration from 1998 to 2000, returned to Harvard and, in 2005, moved to MIT. He was also a faculty affiliate of The Urban Institute, a leading nonpartisan policy research organization in Washington, DC.

Briggs' research centers on economic opportunity, racial and ethnic diversity, and democratic problem-solving in cities worldwide. His teaching has included negotiation and collaborative problem solving; policy analysis; strategy and management, housing and economic development; the politics, history and ethics of planning and social change; and the uses of research in public policy making.

His earliest research, focused on the social networks of poor young people, examined the controversial desegregation of public housing following a landmark civil rights lawsuit in Yonkers, New York — later the subject of an HBO miniseries, Show Me a Hero. The widely cited study distinguished the role of social support and social leverage as distinct resources for economic mobility and status attainment — in plain terms, for "getting by" as opposed to "getting ahead."

In 2002, he was a Martin Luther King Jr. Visiting Scholar at MIT. His edited book, The Geography of Opportunity (Brookings, 2005), analyzed the singular role of segregation as America has become more racially and ethnically diverse and at the same time more economically unequal. The book argued that significant responses to segregation remain rare and suspect in American politics and culture, also that these responses consist of either "curing" segregation (by changing housing patterns, i.e. changing where people live) or mitigating its substantial economic and social costs (by changing the links between place of residence and exposure to risks and resources, rather than changing housing patterns themselves). The edited volume also included the leading research on racial attitudes toward integration, racial discrimination in housing markets, links between smart growth in land use policy and housing affordability and segregation, and other key topics. The book won the top book award in planning in 2007 (the Paul Davidoff Award).

A second book, "Democracy as Problem Solving: Civic Capacity in Communities across the Globe" (MIT Press, 2009) offers an account of transformative change and the politics of reform in the U.S., Brazil, India and South Africa. The book, which was a finalist for the C. Wright Mills Prize, also offers an alternative theory of the functions and forms of democracy, focusing on local governance and grounded in core concepts of learning and bargaining, accountability, and stakeholder participation. Influenced by American educator and political philosopher John Dewey, this work argues that learning and bargaining are the twin capacities essential to collective problem-solving and shows the conditions under which it is possible to cultivate and advance both.

Briggs is the founder of two online tools for self-directed learning in the field of civic leadership and local problem-solving: The Community Problem-Solving Project @ MIT, sponsored by the Annie E. Casey Foundation, and Working Smarter in Community Development, sponsored by the MacArthur Foundation.

In 2010, he and co-authors Susan Popkin and John Goering published "Moving to Opportunity: The Story of An American Experiment to Fight Ghetto Poverty" (Oxford University Press). The culmination of more than a decade of work on housing opportunity and the effects of high-risk neighborhoods on poor children and their families, and focused on "surprising" results of one of America's most ambitious housing experiments — a randomized control trial — the book won the Louis Brownlow award from the National Academy of Public Administration. "MTO" underscores the alarming impacts of a "quiet crisis" of unaffordable housing, particularly in America's most economically successful urban regions, where increases in housing prices, especially rents, substantially outstrip increases in wages, especially for low-wage workers and their families. The book also dispels myths about access to social capital, offering an argument about "the weakness of strong ties" — the cost of durable ties to risky relatives, in particular — echoing and extending sociologist Mark Granovetter's influential 1973 thesis on "the strength of weak ties." The book also questions dominant assumptions about individual choice and choice-driven social policy, directly responding to claims of behavioral economics, such as those in the book, Nudge, by renowned legal scholar Cass Sunstein and Nobel economist Richard Thaler.

This mixed-method research, with ethnographic, survey and administrative data on families and regions in the controversial MTO social experiment, complements the influential research of economists Raj Chetty, Lawrence Katz and others examining the decline and the drivers of economic mobility in America. As these and other scholars have shown conclusively, segregation and neighborhood effects play an important role.

Briggs has been an adviser to the Rockefeller Foundation and the World Bank, and was a member of the Aspen Institute's Roundtable on Community Change. He served as an expert witness for the NAACP Legal Defense and Education Fund in civil rights litigation. He has served on the boards of the Global Impact Investing Network, Just Capital, Demos, and the Center for Advanced Studies in Behavioral Sciences and other nonprofits.

His views and research have appeared in the New York Times, Boston Globe, Salon.com, National Public Radio, and other major media. He has appeared on CNN and other broadcast news networks, explaining public policy and budget issues in both English and Spanish.

In November 2020, Briggs was named a member of the Joe Biden presidential transition Agency Review Team to support transition efforts related to the Small Business Administration and the United States Postal Service.

== Personal life ==
Briggs is Bahamian-American and has identified himself as a mixed-race person of color. Born in Miami, Florida, Briggs spent the early part of his life in Nassau, Bahamas, where his family - with roots in the Black Seminole nation, Brazil, and Europe - has lived since the early 19th century. His mother, Angela (1933–2015), was the daughter of Bill Aranha, Nassau's crown lands officer during the 1940s, and his father, Nevin Briggs (1932–1978), was an out island doctor, born and raised in Nova Scotia, Canada.

Raised by his mother, Briggs moved back to the U.S. in 1976, several years after The Bahamas secured independence from Britain. In Miami he attended Belen Jesuit Preparatory School, a Catholic high school with strong ties to Cuba and the Cuban-American community. He later received a BS in engineering from Stanford University, worked with the planning firm of Moore Iacofano Goltsman in Berkeley, CA, and won a Rotary Scholarship to study education and community development in Brazil, living in Salvador, Bahia. In 1993 he earned a Master in Public Administration (MPA) from Harvard University. In 1996 he earned a PhD in sociology and education from Columbia University, where he studied under Robert Crain, Herbert Gans, Charles Kadushin, and other scholars. While a student at Stanford, Briggs designed and taught the second version of the Unseen America course, an approach in democratic experiential education, and joined with David Lempert and others to publish a book on this alternative approach to education.

== Key publications ==
- Lempert, David; Briggs, Xavier de Souza (1995). Escape from the Ivory Tower: Student Adventures in Democratic Experiential Education. San Francisco: Jossey-Bass Publishers/Simon & Schuster. ISBN 0-7879-0136-9.
- Briggs, Xavier de Souza; Miller, Anita; Shapiro, John (Winter 2006). "Planning for Community Building: CCRP in the South Bronx". Planners' Casebook, American Institute of Certified Planners.
- Briggs, Xavier de Souza; Mueller, Elizabeth J.; Sullivan, M. (1997). From Neighborhood to Community: Evidence on the Social Effects of Community Development. New York: Community Development Research Center, New School for Social Research.
- Briggs, Xavier de Souza (April 1998). "Brown Kids in White Suburbs: Housing Mobility and the Multiple Faces of Social Capital". Fannie Mae Foundation Housing Policy Debate. 9 (1).
- Briggs, Xavier de Souza; Darden, Joe T.; Aidala, Angela (March 1999). "In the Wake of Desegregation Early Impacts of Scattered-Site Public Housing on Neighborhoods in Yonkers, New York" (PDF). Journal of the American Planning Association. 65 (1): 27–49. doi:10.1080/01944369908976032.
- Briggs, Xavier de Souza (2003). "Community Building". In Christensen, Karen; Levinson, David (eds.). Encyclopedia of Community: From the Village to the Virtual World. SAGE. ISBN 0-7619-2598-8.
- Briggs, Xavier de Souza (December 2004). "Civilization in Color: The Multicultural City in Three Millennia". City & Community. 3 (4): 311–342. doi:10.1111/j.1535-6841.2004.00091.x. S2CID 227069996.
- Briggs, Xavier de Souza (2005). The Geography of Opportunity Race and Housing Choice in Metropolitan America. Washington, DC: Brookings Institution Press. ISBN 0-8157-0873-4.
- Briggs, Xavier de Souza (November 2007). "Some of My Best Friends Are: Interracial Friendship, Class, and Segregation in America". City & Community. 6 (4): 263–290. doi:10.1111/j.1540-6040.2007.00228.x. S2CID 227257216.
- Briggs, Xavier de Souza; Turner, Margery Austin (March 2005). "Fairness in new New Orleans". The Three-City Study of Moving to Opportunity, Policy Briefs. Archived from the original on May 1, 2008.
- Briggs, Xavier de Souza (2008). Democracy as Problem Solving. Cambridge, MA: MIT Press. ISBN 978-0-262-02641-3. Archived from the original on October 8, 2012.
