= Gesu Church (Miami) =

Roman Catholic Church and United States historic place

- U.S. National Register of Historic Places
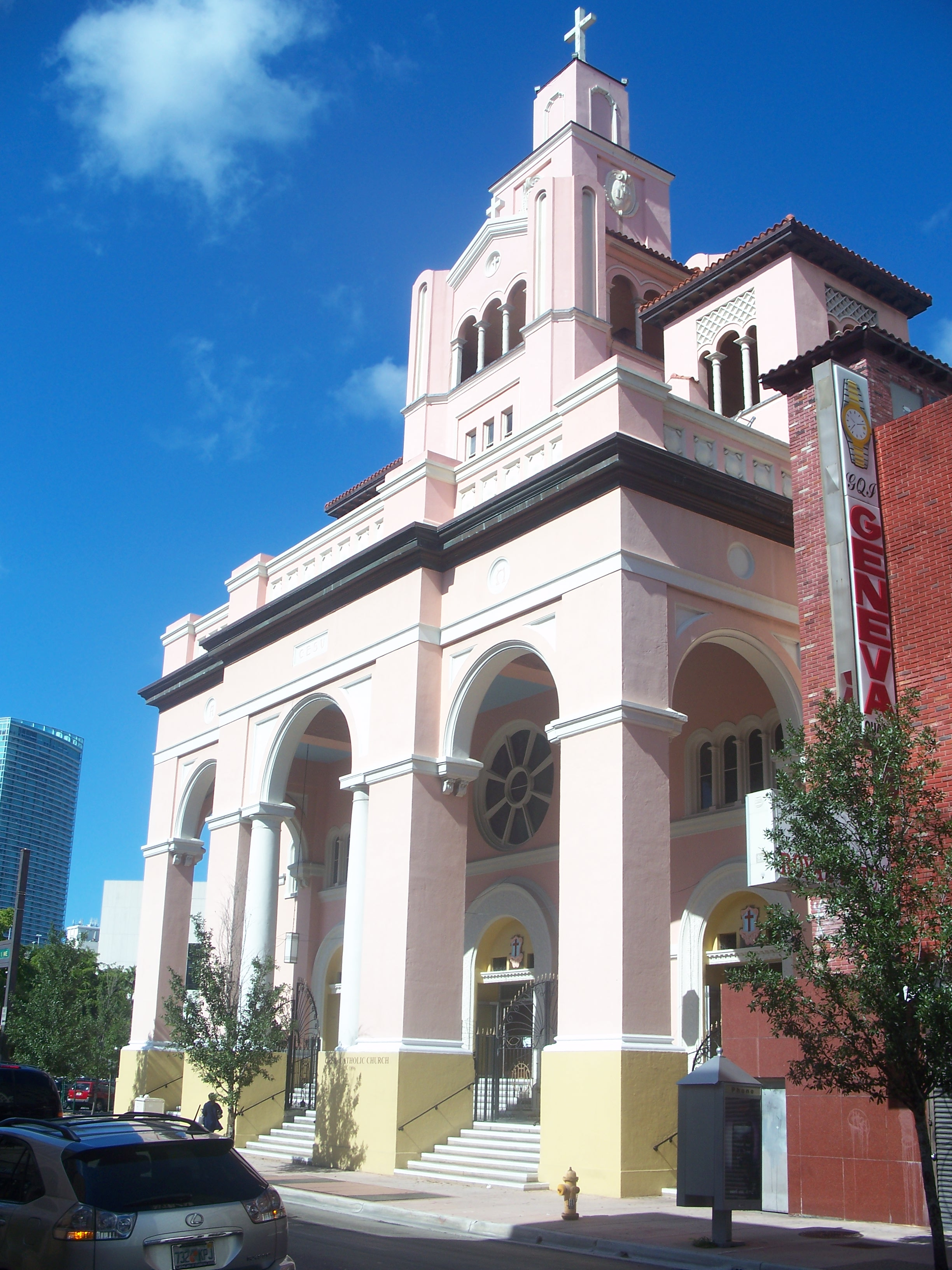

- Location within Miami Location within Florida Location within the United States
- Location: Miami, Florida
- Coordinates: 25°46′33″N 80°11′30″W
- Architectural style: Mediterranean Revival Style
- NRHP reference No.: 74000617
- Added to NRHP: July 18, 1974

The Gesu Church is a historic Roman Catholic church in Miami, Florida. It is located at 118 Northeast 2nd Street. On July 18, 1974, it was added to the U.S. National Register of Historic Places. The church was built in 1896 and is the oldest Catholic Church in Miami.

== Description ==
The Gesu Church is significant for its important role in the religious history of Miami and as a reflection of the City's development. In addition, the buildings are examples of religious architecture and noteworthy for the excellence of its design, craftsmanship, and detailing.

Gesu is Miami's oldest Catholic parish and has served the religious and humanitarian needs of the community for over a century. The growth of the parish closely parallels the development of the City of Miami.

Miami's first Catholic Mass was conducted in 1872 when Father Dufau, who had been sent to South Florida by Bishop John Marcellus Peter Augustine Verot, P.S.S. of St. Augustine, celebrated Mass and confirmed the pioneer family of William J. Wagner. Wagner constructed a small wooden church on his homestead in 1875, and this became Miami's first house of worship.

The Holy Name Parish (now Gesu) was organized in 1896 and the pastor was Father Ambrose Fontan, S.J. A new church was constructed in 1897 on land donated by Henry Flagler. As Miami's population and the Holy Name congregation expanded, the need for a larger church became evident. A cornerstone was subsequently laid on December 10, 1920, on the site of the earlier church, and the new building was dedicated in 1925.

Gesu Church continues to serve as one of the three downtown churches and was recently restored to its original appearance. The parish has been staffed by the Jesuits of the society's Antilles province since 2004. Previously it was staffed by the Jesuits of New Orleans province. Father Eduardo "Eddy" Alvarez, S.J. is the pastor. The church seating capacity is 700 plus 150 in choir balcony.

== Schools ==
The Gesu Parish School opened in 1905 with six grades and 60 students. The original school name was The Academy of the Sisters of St. Joseph St. Catherine's Convent. The school was also known as St. Catherine's Convent School and St. Catherine's Academy. There were four graduates in the first high school graduating class of 1913. The Sisters of St. Joseph of St. Augustine, Florida, were the teaching staff at the school.

A new five story school was built in 1926 and the name changed to Gesu Parish School. It was located at 130 Northeast 2nd Street. The last Gesu High School graduation was in 1953. There were 40 graduates in that class. The last eighth grade graduation was in 1982 when the school was closed. The school was demolished in 1984.

== Leadership ==
Below are lists of individuals who have led the church and school since their founding:

=== Church Pastors ===
- Rev. Ambrose Fontan, S.J. (1896–1898)
- Rev. James Moore, S.J. (1898 [Only 4 Months])
- Rev. Ambrose Fontan, S.J. (1898–1903)
- Rev. Patrick Kennedy, S.J. (1903–1908)
- Rev. Alexander B. Friend (1908–1914)
- Rev. James McLaughlin, S.J. (1914–1929)
- Rev. Edward Cummings, S.J. (1929–1930)
- Rev. Michael McNally, S.J. (1930–1934)
- Rev. Florence D. Sullivan, S.J. (1934–1945)
- Rev. John H. McAtee, S.J. (1945–1949)
- Rev. John Druhan, S.J. (1949–1953)
- Rev. Harold Gaudin, S.J. (1953–1959)
- Rev. John Sweeney, S.J. (1959–1970)
- Rev. Michael English, S.J. (1970–1971)
- Rev. Ignatius Fabacher, S.J. (1971–1975)
- Rev. John Edwards, S.J. (1975–1983)
- Rev. James Donald Pearce, S.J. (1983–1991)
- Rev. George Casey, S.J. (1991–1993)
- Rev. Thomas J. Madden, S.J. (1993–2002)
- Rev. William Mayer, S.J. (2002–2004)
- Rev. Eduardo J. Alvarez, S.J. (2004–2023)
- Rev. David Pantaleon, S.J. (2023–Present)

==== Current Pastor ====
Rev. Eduardo J. Alvarez, S.J. (born in 1945 in Cuba) graduated from Belen Jesuit Preparatory School in 1963. He received a master of arts degree from St. Michael's College and a master's degree in education from Barry University. Prior to becoming pastor at Gesu Church, he taught at Belen Jesuit Preparatory School and was its chaplain (1975–2004).

=== First Sisters of St. Joseph at School ===
- Sister Euphemia
- Sister Aloysia
- Sister Raymond

=== School Principals ===
- Sister M. Euphemia Sullivan (1905–1909)
- Sister Margaret Mary Hanlon (1909–1922)
- Unknown (1922–1934)
- Sister Francis of Assissi Byrne (Sister F. Assissium) (1934–1941)
- Sister Francis of Assissi Byrne (Sister F. Assissium), Mother Theresa Joseph Brown (1941–1942)
- Rev. Godfrey S. Cook, Sister M. Celestine Hehir (1942–1945)
- Sister Mary Herbert Rogero (1945–1952)
- Mother Theresa Joseph Brown (1952–1958)
- Sister St. Anne Stone (1958–1961)
- Sister Teresa Maria O'Donovan (1961–1967)
- Sister Margaret Therese Schaufler (1967–1971)
- Sister M. Trinita McCarthy (1971–1979)
- Sister Mary Ester Flanagan (1979–1981)
- Sister Breedeen Connolly (1981–1985)
