= Jorge I. Domínguez =

Academic specializing in Latin American studies

- Born: 1945 (age 80–81); Havana, Cuba
- Education: Yale University (B.A., 1967); Harvard University (M.A., 1968; Ph.D., 1972)
- Employer: Retired from Harvard University
- Title: Antonio Madero Professor for the Study of Mexico

Jorge I. Domínguez (born 1945), a scholar of Latin American studies in the United States, taught at Harvard University from 1972 to 2018, when he retired as the Antonio Madero Professor for the Study of Mexico.

He began his teaching career at Harvard in 1972, and in 1979 was granted tenure. From 1995 to 2006, he served as director of Harvard's Weatherhead Center for International Affairs. From 2006 to 2015, he served as Harvard's first Vice Provost for International Affairs in the Office of the Provost, and Senior Advisor for International Studies to the Dean of the Harvard Faculty of Arts and Sciences. He also chaired the Harvard Academy for International and Area Studies, served as an associate of Harvard's David Rockefeller Center for Latin American Studies, and as an associate of Harvard's Leverett House.

Domínguez has published books and articles on Latin America and, in particular, Cuba. In 1989, Abraham F. Lowenthal described him in Foreign Affairs as the dean of U.S. Cubanologists.

In February 2018, an article in The Chronicle of Higher Education alleged that Domínguez had committed acts of sexual assault and sexual harassment since the late 1970s. In response, Harvard launched a review of the allegations and placed Domínguez on paid administrative leave. He announced he would retire at the end of the Spring 2018 semester, and did so on June 18 of that year. Harvard's Title IX investigation concluded in May 2019 that Domínguez had engaged in unwelcome sexual conduct, and the university stripped him of his emeritus status and disinvited him from its campus. In January 2020, the Latin American Studies Association, of which he had been president, revoked his membership due to his violations of ethical standards.

== Background and education ==
Domínguez was born in Havana, Cuba. He left Cuba with his family for the United States in 1960, when he was 15 years of age.

He attended Belen Jesuit Preparatory School in Miami, Florida, and in 1963 graduated from Fordham Preparatory School, in the Bronx in New York City. In 1967, he received his B.A. from Yale University. He went on to receive his M.A. (1968) and Ph.D. (1972) from Harvard University. He was a member of the Harvard Society of Fellows.

== Academic positions ==
Domínguez began his teaching career at Harvard in 1972, and by 1979 was granted tenure.

He was the Antonio Madero Professor for the Study of Mexico at Harvard until his retirement in June 2018.

From 1995 to 2006, he served as director of Harvard's Weatherhead Center for International Affairs. From 2006 to 2015, he served as Harvard's first Vice Provost for International Affairs in the Office of the Provost, and as Senior Advisor for International Studies to the Dean of the Harvard Faculty of Arts and Sciences. Prior to his retirement, he also chaired the Harvard Academy for International and Area Studies, and also as an associate of Harvard's David Rockefeller Center for Latin American Studies, and an associate of Harvard's Leverett House.

== Scholarship ==
Domínguez' books include: The Construction of Democracy: Lessons from Practice and Research; Between Compliance and Conflict: East Asia, Latin America and the New Pax Americana; The Cuban Economy at the Start of the Twenty-First Century; Mexico’s Pivotal Democratic Election: Candidates, Voters, and the Presidential Campaign of 2000; Boundary Disputes in Latin America; Constructing Democratic Governance in Latin America; Mexico, Central, and South America: New Perspectives, The United States and Mexico: Between Partnership and Conflict; Democratic Politics in Latin America and the Caribbean; International Security and Democracy; Technopols; Democratizing Mexico; and Conflictos Territoriales y Democracia en America Latina.

Some articles written by Domínguez:

- "How Asia Can Tackle Crises", The Straits Times; 19 July 2006
- "A Legacy of Mixed Messages", The Boston Globe; 16 January 2006
- "Bush Administration Policy: A View toward Latin America"; ReVista, Spring/Summer 2005
- "Liberty for Latin America"; The Washington Post; 13 March 2005
- "US and Cuba Cooperate on Many Issues"; The Miami Herald; 29 February 2004
- "Cuba: His Brother's Keeper"; Foreign Policy, 139; November/December 2003

In addition to his substantive academic contributions, Domínguez worked over the years to develop the scholarly field of Latin Americanist social science in four large-scale multi-book multi-authored projects involving authors from the United States and most Latin American authors.

First, he encouraged U.S. and Mexican scholars to carry out research on Mexican public opinion and voting behavior. In particular, a team of research colleagues developed panel studies to interview and re-interview individuals during the same presidential election campaigns (2000, 2006, 2012), and within a year or two made the primary data for these surveys freely and universally available on the Web.

Second, working with international teams that featured Cuban social scientists, Domínguez fostered research by Cuban academics and supported their research, writing, and publication in English to make such work better known. This endeavor spanned U.S.-Cuban relations, macroeconomic and microeconomic policies, poverty, social mobility, and territorial inequalities. For this effort to advance and make known the work of Cuban scholars, and for his own research, he received the lifetime contribution award from the Cuba Section of the Latin American Studies Association.

Third, as a founding member of the Washington, D.C.–based think tank Inter-American Dialogue, Domínguez and Dialogue colleagues generated assessments of the state of democratic politics across Latin America. The first book covered every country of Latin America, while the other three books focused on the large countries, with each volume featuring authors from across the continent. This project led to his appointment as a founding adviser for the non-profit Club de Madrid, whose members are former presidents and prime ministers of democratic countries the world over.

And fourth, Domínguez and Rafael Fernández de Castro designed a project of books on U.S. relations with key Latin American countries and subregions; most books with two authors—one from the United States, and one from the respective Latin American country. This project led also to his co-founding of Foreign Affairs Latinomérica and membership on its editorial board.

== Sexual harassment and alleged sexual assault ==
In 1983, Domínguez was disciplined by Harvard's administration for "serious conduct" for sexually harassing Terry Karl, then a junior faculty colleague in Harvard's Government Department (later, a professor of political science and Latin American studies at Stanford University). He was forbidden to hold administrative responsibilities for three years. Nevertheless, Domínguez was subsequently promoted several times, and was appointed the Vice Provost for International Affairs.

On February 27, 2018, The Chronicle of Higher Education reported that at least ten women, including graduate students and junior colleagues, described incidents in which Domínguez allegedly sexually assaulted or sexually harassed them, dating back to 1979 and continuing through at least 2015. According to the New York Times, allegations from other women "ranged in severity, from inappropriate full-body hugs to claims by one woman that he grabbed her buttocks and tried to put his hand down her pants." According to the article, Domínguez stepped between the former Venezuelan president, Rafael Caldera, and Karl as they approached one another at a Harvard reception; Dominguez, speaking in Spanish, then introduced Karl to Caldera as his "slave". Karl recounted that he told her one evening, while walking across campus following a meeting, that "this would be a nice place for a rape", making Karl fear for her safety. She felt that despite the administration's acknowledgement of her complaint, Harvard did not take the issue of sexual assault seriously. Some accusers recalled that they dropped classes, abandoned projects, or, as in Karl's case, left the university to escape him.

Domínguez said he was surprised and saddened by the allegations, suggested that his behavior may have been misinterpreted, and further said, "I do not go around making sexual advances."

In response to these accusations, Harvard University announced in March 2018 that it was soliciting additional information from university affiliates regarding Domínguez's alleged misconduct. He was placed on paid administrative leave pending conclusion of an internal review. Domínguez's membership in the Leverett House Senior Common Room was revoked.

On March 6, 2018, Domínguez resigned from his administrative positions and announced his intention to retire fully from Harvard at the end of the Spring 2018 semester. University administrators said that the sexual harassment investigations would not be affected by his retirement.

In May 2019, Harvard concluded its investigation, finding that Domínguez had engaged in unwelcome sexual conduct toward multiple people over a long time. As a result, Domínguez was stripped of his emeritus status and privileges, and disinvited from the university campus and sponsored events.

The Latin American Studies Association revoked the membership of Domínguez in January 2020.

In February 2021 Harvard formally apologized to Karl for failing to adequately enforce sanctions against Domínguez in her sexual harassment complaint against him.
