= Leonardo Morales y Pedroso =

Cuban architect (1887–1965)

- Born: January 25, 1887; Havana, Cuba
- Died: November 17, 1965 (aged 78); Havana, Cuba

Leonardo Morales y Pedroso (January 25, 1887– November 17, 1965) was one of the most prominent Cuban architect in Cuba in the first half 20th century. In 1900 he entered and attended pre-university studies at De Witt Clinton High of New York, where he obtained a bachelor's degree. In 1909 he graduated of Bachelor in Architecture from Columbia University. After graduating, he returned to Cuba in 1909 where he worked a time in the local architect firm of Newton & Sola with the architect Thomas M. Newton, who was director of the civil construction section of the Secretary of Public Works during the 2nd American intervention in Cuba. In February 1910, he returned to the United States and obtained a master's degree (Doctor) in Architecture from Columbia University in the State of New York. After obtaining his doctorate in architecture he joined in March 1910 the architecture Company Morales y Mata arquitectos, created in 1907 by his elder brother the engineer Luis Morales y Pedroso in association with the master builder Jose F. Mata. In 1917, after having built more than 30 important buildings, they decided to separate from José Mata, who had to stop working because illness and died a short time later. The company changed its name for Morales y Compañia Arquitectos with his brother the engineer Luis Morales y Pedroso as president and Leonardo as Associate together with other 7 architects. He was able to obtain noteworthy real estate commissions partly because of his family's origin, good social connections and social standing in Havana high society (his great-grandfather was the Marques de la Real Proclamación). He was named by the Cuban press of the time as the "Havana's architect" and his architectural style is recognized as the "Morales style". During 50 years Leonardo Morales y Pedroso received around 250 notable architectural commissions, some of them include:

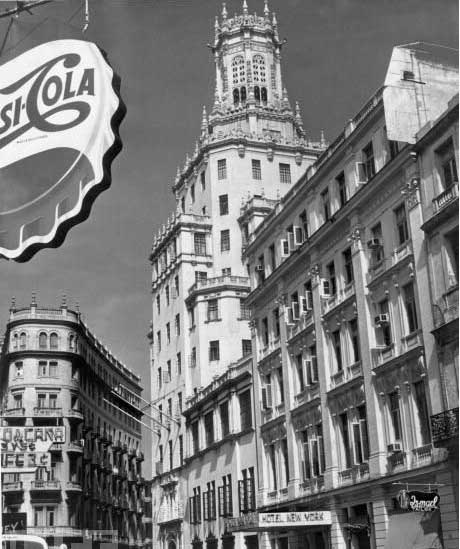
Cuban Telephone Co. Havana, Cuba

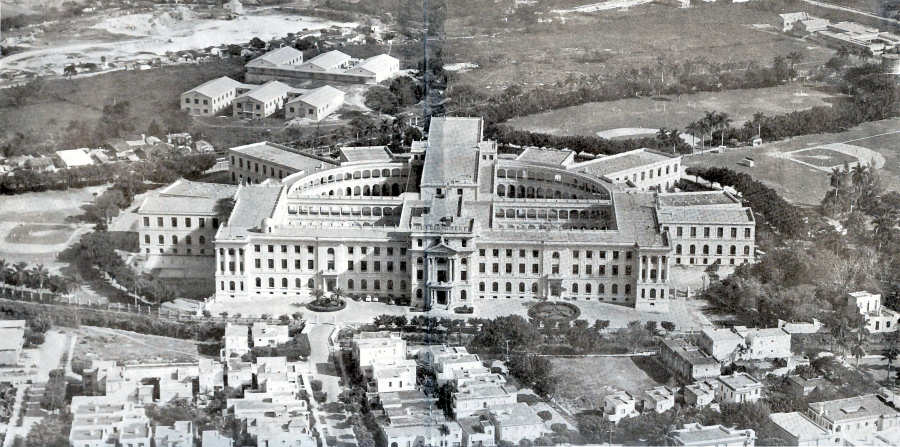
Colegio de Belén in 1950's

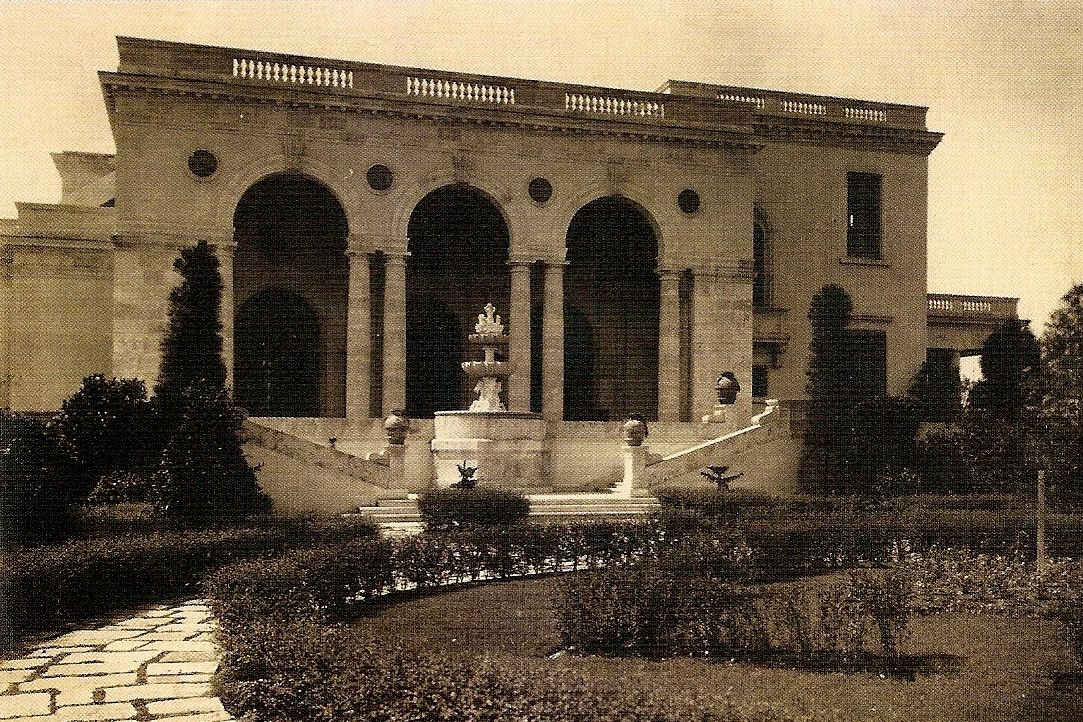
La Mansión de Mark Pollack in 1931.

Some Projects with Morales y Mata Arquitectos :

- Home of Jacinto Pedroso y Hdez, 13th Street and 8th street Vedado La Habana. 1910-1913
- Home of William Lawton, Domínguez street and Santa Catalina Lawton La Habana. 1912
- Vedado Tennis Club, 12th street Vedado La Habana, 1912
- Sociedad Cubana de Ingenieros, Habana Vieja, 1912
- Home of Lily Hidalgo Borges de Conill, Paseo avenue Vedado La Habana, 1914
- Home of Josefina García Pola de Tirso Mesa, 13th Street and D street, Vedado La Habana, 1916
- Banco Mendoza y Cía., Obispo Street N° 305, Habana Vieja, 1916
- Home of Pablo González de Mendoza y Pedroso, Paseo avenue and 15th, Vedado La Habana, 1916
- Home of Antonio Sánchez Bustamante. Paseo avenue and 19th street, Vedado La Habana 1916
- Home of Miguel Arango y Mantilla, 25 street N°301 and M street Vedado La Habana. 1916
- Home of Enrique Pedro y Pérez Miro, 13 street N°601 and C street Vedado La Habana. 1916

Some Projects with Morales y Compañía Arquitectos :

- Head Office of Morales and Company Architectes, Habana Vieja La Habana. 1917-1922
- Home of José Ignacio Lezama, Vedado La Habana, 1917
- Home of Manuel José Morales, Vedado La Habana, 1917
- Colegio Salesiano (Arts and Crafts), La Vibora La Habana, 1917
- Business and office building of Claudio Mendoza y Arellano. Galeano Street Centro Habana La Habana 1918
- Home of Salvador Guedes, 1920
- Home of Alberto Fowler, Country Club La Habana, 1920
- Home of Andrés Gómez Mena, 7th street and 6th street, Miramar La Habana
- Home of Marqués de Pinar del Rio, 17th street and B street, Vedado La Habana
- Home of Upman, 17th street and K street, Vedado La Habana
- Home of Sebastián Guedes, 13th street and 5th street, Vedado La Habana
- Home of Carlos Nadal, 1921
- Home of Elvira Cil, 1923, 23 street and B street, Vedado La Habana
- Home of George S. Ward, Country Club La Habana
- Compañía de Teléfonos de Marianao, La Habana, 1924
- Colegio de Belén, Havana, Marianao La Habana 1925
- Home of Eduardo Montalvo, 9th street Miramar La Habana, 1926
- Home of Eduardo J. Chibas, 17th Street and H street, Vedado La Habana, 1926
- Compañía Cubana de Teléfonos, Aguila street and Dragones street Centro Habana, 1924-1927
- Home of María Teresa O’Reilly, Condesa de Buenavista, 5th Avenue Miramar. 1928
- Finca Chirgota. 1928
- La Mansion of Mark A. Pollack Cuabanacan, La Habana, 1930
- Luxury dwelling building in San Lazaro street N°470 Centro Habana
- Luxury dwelling building in Malecon Avenue N°507 Centro Habana
- La Sagrada familia Church, Vista Alegre Santiago de Cuba
- San Agustin Church in 37 street, reparto Nicanor del Campo, La Habana, 1939
- Santa Rita Church in 5th avenue, Miramar, La Habana, 1942
- Chapel of Quinta de Santovenia in El Cerro, La Habana
- Corpus Christi Church, 150 A street and 15th street Country Club La Habana. 1949
- Pedroso Bank, Aguiar Street N° 251 and Empedrado street Habana Vieja. 1952
- Hospital (against cancer) Marie Curie, Vedado, La Habana, 1946
- Notre Dame of Fatima Church, 1st Avenue and 6 street Varadero Matanzas. 1953

== See also ==
- Colegio de Belén, Havana
- La Mansión
