= Instituto Técnico Militar =

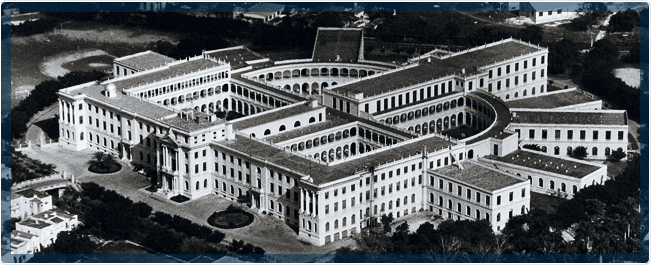
- Interactive map of the Instituto Técnico Militar area
- Former names: Colegio de Belén, Havana

General information
- Type: Educational
- Architectural style: Eclectic
- Location: Marianao, Ciudad de La Habana, Cuba
- Coordinates: 23.096°N 82.417°W
- Current tenants: Cuban military
- Opened: 1961; 65 years ago
- Owner: Cuban military

Technical details
- Structural system: Steel frame
- Floor count: 4
- Grounds: 190,000 m2

Design and construction
- Architect: Leonardo Morales y Pedroso
- Architecture firm: Morales & Cia

The Instituto Técnico Militar (lit. Technical Military Institute), originally designed as the Colegio de Belén, Havana, is located at 45th and 66th streets in Marianao, Havana, Cuba.

== History ==
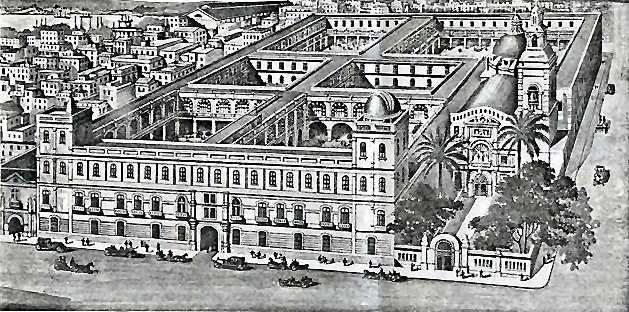
Colegio de Belén (1854–1925)

Her Majesty Isabella II, Queen of Spain, issued a royal charter in the year 1854 founding the Colegio de Belén (Belen School) in Havana, Cuba. Belen School began its educational work in the building formerly occupied by the convent and convalescent hospital of Our Lady of Belen.

== Instituto ==
In 1961 the government of Fidel Castro (himself a graduate of Belen) confiscated all private and religious schools in Cuba. Castro expelled the Jesuits and declared the government of Cuba an atheist government. Castro's government nationalized businesses and banks, confiscating more than $1 billion in American-owned property. Thousands of those dubbed “enemies of the revolution” were executed or imprisoned, and the school curriculum was reshaped by communist doctrine. Free speech was not an option, and the Cuban socialist press was an extension of the government.

== See also ==
- Colegio de Belén, Havana
- Belen Jesuit Preparatory School
- List of Jesuit sites
