= Belen Jesuit Preparatory School =

Catholic all-male school in Miami, US

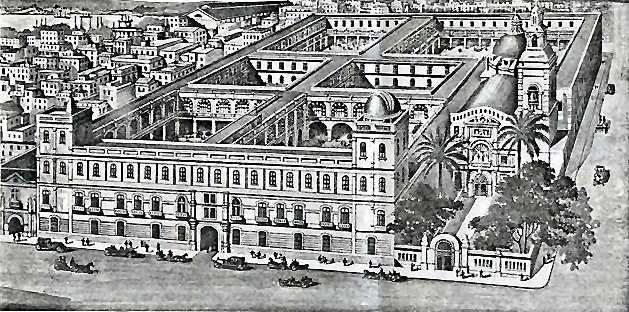
- Belen Jesuit Preparatory School in Havana

Location
- 500 Southwest 127th Avenue, Miami, Miami-Dade County, Florida 33184; United States; 25°45′46″N 80°24′06″W

Information
- Former name: Colegio de Belén (1854)
- Type: Private, Roman Catholic Non-profit College preparatory All-boys Secondary (grades 6–12) education institution
- Motto: Latin: Ad Majorem Dei Gloriam; Spanish: Para la mayor gloria de Dios; English: For The Greater Glory of God
- Religious affiliation: Roman Catholic (Jesuit)
- Established: 1854; 172 years ago
- Founder: Queen Isabella II of Spain
- President: Guillermo García-Tuñon
- Dean: Andres De Angulo
- Principal: José E. Roca
- Enrollment: 1,367 enrollment as of 2025-26
- Campus: Urban 33 acres (130,000 m^{2})
- Colors: Blue and Gold
- Athletics: Varsity team name Belen Wolverines
- Mascot: Waldo the Wolverine
- Nickname: Wolverines
- Website: belenjesuit.org

Belen Jesuit Preparatory School (Spanish: Colegio Preparatorio Jesuita Belén) is a private, Catholic, all-male, preparatory school run by the Antilles Province of the Society of Jesus in Tamiami, unincorporated Miami-Dade County, Florida, operated by the Society of Jesus. It was established in Havana, Cuba, by the Jesuits in 1854 but moved to the United States after the communist government of Fidel Castro, himself an alumnus, took power and expelled the Jesuits. It has since made the Cardinal Newman Society's honor roll. The name Belen is Spanish for "Bethlehem."

== History ==
=== Havana Vieja, 1854-1925 ===
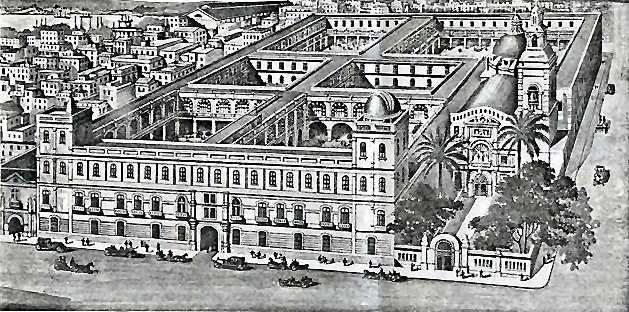
Convento de Belén, Calle Compostela, between Luz y Acosta, Old Havana, Cuba.

In 1854, Queen Isabella II of Spain issued a royal charter founding the "Colegio de Belén" in Havana. The school took its name from the building it occupied at its founding, the colonial convent and convalescent hospital of Our Lady of Belén. Over time, the school expanded through the acquisition of several nearby buildings in Havana. The resulting complex became known as "El Palacio de Educación" (The Palace of Education). "El Palacio" now houses the Instituto Técnico Militar (Military Technical Institute).

A meteorological observatory was established in 1857. A facility was built in 1896. The education of students was assigned to the priests and brothers of the Society of Jesus (the Jesuits).

=== Marianao, 1925-1961 ===
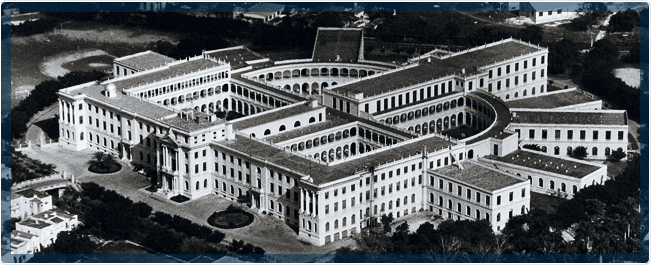
Colegio de Belén in Marianao by the architect Leonardo Morales y Pedroso

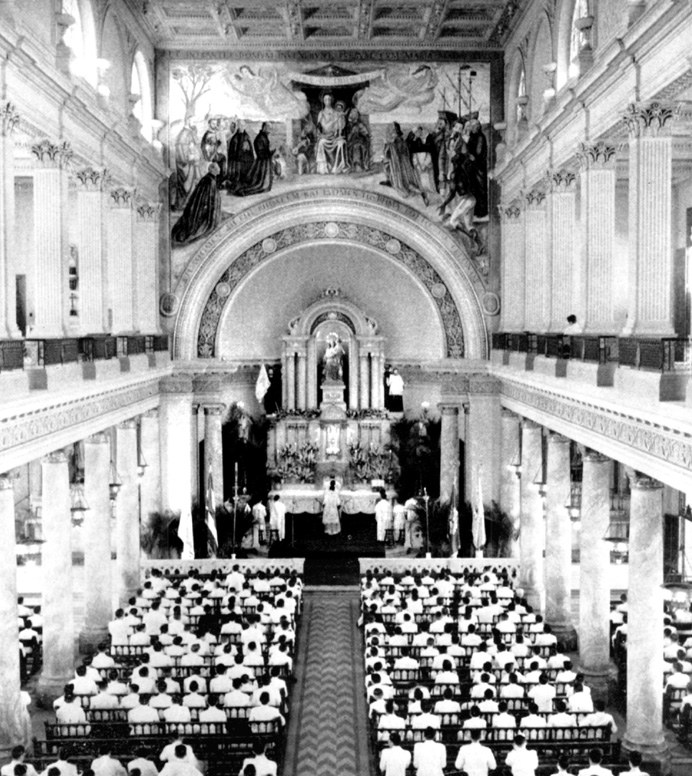
Chapel, Colegio de Belen in Marianao, Havana. ca. 1955.

The Colegio de Belén opened in Marianao in 1925. Situated next door to the Tropicana Club, it was constructed on sixty acres of land that had been donated and was to be used as the main building of the Colegio de Belén, which had been opened since 1854 within the premises of the convent of the same name in Old Havana. Those premises had become unsuitable and badly located due to the change of atmosphere in the neighborhood and the growth of the city. The project was designed by the Cuban architectural firm of Morales & Cia (Leonardo Morales y Pedroso) in 1925 with an unlimited budget for designing a religious school, the Colegio de Belén, Havana.

The result was a monumental pan-optical edifice with an extensive neoclassical façade perpendicular to the chapel and four large courtyards, recalling the building in Havana Vieja, with three stories of porticoed galleries to link nine radial pavilions. The appearance is of extreme monumentality which is supported both in the design resources and the unusual dimensions of the spaces. The structure is built from concrete-covered steel, the flooring and roof are monolithic reinforced concrete.

=== 1961 ===
In 1961 the government of Fidel Castro (himself a graduate of Belen) confiscated all private and religious schools in Cuba. Castro expelled the Jesuits and declared the government of Cuba an atheist government. Thousands of those dubbed "enemies of the revolution" were executed or imprisoned, and the school curriculum was reshaped by communist doctrine.

== In the United States ==
In 1961, the revolutionary regime confiscated the school's property and expelled the Jesuit faculty. The school was re-established in Miami the same year on the fourth floor of the Gesu Elementary School. The building no longer exists and is now downtown Miami's Gesu Church's parking lot. In 1962, a new building was acquired and the school moved to the new site on the corner of SW 8th Street and 7th Avenue.

Since 1981, Belen Jesuit sits on a 34-acre site in western Miami-Dade County. There are over 8,000 members of the Belen Alumni Association currently active. Belen Jesuit is a member of the Society of Jesus Caribbean Province which consists of the sections of Miami, Dominican Republic, Cuba, Jamaica, and Guyana.

Belen Jesuit is accredited by Cognia. The school is also affiliated with the National Catholic Educational Association and is a member of the Jesuit Schools Network and the Jesuit High School College Counselors Association.

== Observatory ==
The Fr. Benito Viñes, S.J. Observatory for Astronomy and Meteorology was built with donations from the Belen Jesuit Class of 1972 and is named the Fr. Benito Viñes, S.J. Observatory. The observatory has an array of 11 telescopes, and Belen is the only middle/high school in South Florida equipped with a 16" telescope with a charge-coupled device (digital) camera for astrophotography. Weather forecasts from the facility are radioed daily to various cities in Florida. The observatory has grown and become popular under Fr. Pedro Cartaya, S.J.

== Athletics ==
Belen Jesuit competes in 17 sports and has 55 teams. Sports offered at Belen include baseball, basketball, bowling, crew, cross country, fencing, flag football, football, golf, lacrosse, soccer, swimming, tennis, track and field, volleyball, water polo, and wrestling. Typically over 1,000 athletes participate annually.

== The Ramón Guiteras Memorial Library ==
The Ramón Guiteras Memorial Library is located on campus. The library houses La Colección Cubana (The Cuban Collection), a special collection of Cuban books. La Colección Cubana consists of over 8,000 volumes written either on the subject of Cuba or penned by Cubans and Cuban-Americans. La Colección Cubana is open to the public and is the second-largest collection of Cuban books and other media outside of Cuba.

== See also ==
- Arco de Belén, Havana
- List of Jesuit sites
- Colegio de Belén, Havana
