= National Register of Historic Places listings in Miami =

Location of Miami in Florida

This is a list of the National Register of Historic Places listings in Miami, Florida.

This is intended to be a complete list of the properties and districts on the National Register of Historic Places in Miami, Florida, United States. The locations of National Register properties and districts for which the latitude and longitude coordinates are included below, may be seen in an online map.

There are 195 properties and districts listed on the National Register in Miami-Dade County, including 6 National Historic Landmarks. Miami is the location of 81 of these properties and districts, including 5 National Historic Landmarks; they are listed here, while the remaining properties and districts are listed separately. One property, the Venetian Causeway, is split between Miami and Miami Beach, and is thus included on both lists. Another 4 sites were once listed, but have been removed.

This National Park Service list is complete through NPS recent listings posted June 6, 2026.

Contents: Counties in Florida (non-linked contain no National Register listings)
Alachua - Baker - Bay - Bradford - Brevard - Broward - Calhoun - Charlotte - Citrus - Clay - Collier - Columbia - DeSoto - Dixie - Duval - Escambia - Flagler - Franklin - Gadsden - Gilchrist - Glades - Gulf - Hamilton - Hardee - Hendry - Hernando - Highlands - Hillsborough (Tampa) - Holmes - Indian River - Jackson - Jefferson - Lafayette - Lake - Lee - Leon - Levy - Liberty - Madison - Manatee - Marion - Martin - Miami-Dade (Miami) - Monroe - Nassau - Okaloosa - Okeechobee - Orange - Osceola - Palm Beach - Pasco - Pinellas - Polk - Putnam - St. Johns - St. Lucie - Santa Rosa - Sarasota - Seminole - Sumter - Suwannee - Taylor - Union - Volusia - Wakulla - Walton - Washington

== Current listings ==
	Name on the Register	Image	Date listed	Location	City or town	Description
1	Ace Theatre	Ace Theatre	June 13, 2016 (#16000359)	3664 Grand Ave. 25°43′39″N 80°15′10″W		
2	Atlantic Gas Station	Atlantic Gas Station	December 29, 1988 (#88003060)	668 Northwest 5th Street; 25°46′41″N 80°12′22″W		Part of the Downtown Miami MRA
3	Bacardi Complex	Bacardi Complex	October 16, 2018 (#100003017)	2100 Biscayne Blvd. 25°47′51″N 80°11′22″W		
4	Barracks and Mess Building-US Coast Guard Air Station at Dinner Key	Barracks and Mess Building-US Coast Guard Air Station at Dinner Key	August 10, 1995 (#95000816)	2610 Tigertail Avenue; 25°43′55″N 80°14′07″W		
5	Bay Shore Historic District	Bay Shore Historic District	October 2, 1992 (#92001323)	Roughly bounded by Northeast 55th Street, Biscayne Boulevard, Northeast 60th Street, and Biscayne Bay; 25°49′46″N 80°10′57″W		
6	Brickell Mausoleum	Brickell Mausoleum	January 4, 1989 (#88002977)	501 Brickell Avenue; 25°46′05″N 80°11′30″W		Part of the Downtown Miami MRA
7	Brickell Point Site	Brickell Point Site	February 5, 2002 (#01001534)	401 Brickell Ave; 25°46′08″N 80°11′21″W		
8	William Jennings Bryan House	William Jennings Bryan House	January 20, 2012 (#11001029)	3115 Brickell Ave; 25°44′55″N 80°12′22″W		
9	Central Baptist Church	Central Baptist Church	January 4, 1989 (#88002988)	500 Northeast 1st Avenue; 25°46′31″N 80°11′31″W		Part of the Downtown Miami MRA
10	City National Bank Building	City National Bank Building	January 4, 1989 (#88002975)	121 Southeast 1st Street; 25°46′30″N 80°11′30″W		Part of the Downtown Miami MRA
11	City of Miami Cemetery	City of Miami Cemetery	January 4, 1989 (#88002960)	1800 Northeast 2nd Avenue; 25°47′38″N 80°11′27″W		Part of the Downtown Miami MRA
12	Coconut Grove Library	Coconut Grove Library	May 1, 2017 (#100000932)	2875 McFarlane Rd. 25°43′36″N 80°14′26″W		
13	Coconut Grove Playhouse	Coconut Grove Playhouse	October 19, 2018 (#100003018)	3500 Main Hwy; 25°43′32″N 80°14′41″W		
14	Congress Building	Congress Building	March 14, 1985 (#85000553)	111 Northeast 2nd Avenue; 25°46′31″N 80°11′24″W		
15	Dade County Courthouse	Dade County Courthouse	January 4, 1989 (#88002983)	73 West Flagler Street; 25°46′27″N 80°11′43″W		Part of the Downtown Miami MRA
16	D. A. Dorsey House	D. A. Dorsey House	January 4, 1989 (#88002966)	250 Northwest 9th Street; 25°46′57″N 80°11′56″W		Part of the Downtown Miami MRA
17	Marjory Stoneman Douglas House	Marjory Stoneman Douglas House	February 27, 2015 (#15000312)	3744 Stewart Ave. 25°42′40″N 80°15′13″W		Home of environmentalist and activist Marjory Stoneman Douglas
18	Downtown Miami Historic District	Downtown Miami Historic District	December 6, 2005 (#05001356)	Roughly bounded by Miami Ct., 3rd Street, 3rd Avenue, and 2nd Street; 25°46′21″N 80°11′31″W		
19	Alfred I. DuPont Building	Alfred I. DuPont Building	January 4, 1989 (#88002984)	169 East Flagler Street; 25°46′28″N 80°11′26″W		Part of the Downtown Miami MRA
20	Ebenezer Methodist Church	Ebenezer Methodist Church	June 8, 2026 (#100009673)	1074 NW 3rd Avenue; 25°47′04″N 80°12′00″W		Historic and Architectural Properties of Overtown in Miami, Florida (1896-1964) MPS
21	El Jardin	El Jardin	August 30, 1974 (#74000614)	3747 Main Highway; 25°43′18″N 80°14′54″W		
22	Fire Station No. 2	Fire Station No. 2	January 4, 1989 (#88002971)	1401 North Miami Avenue; 25°47′17″N 80°11′41″W		Part of the Downtown Miami MRA
23	Fire Station No. 4	Fire Station No. 4	March 8, 1984 (#84000836)	1000 South Miami Avenue; 25°45′51″N 80°11′36″W		
24	First Coconut Grove School	First Coconut Grove School	January 21, 1975 (#75000547)	3429 Devon Road; 25°43′19″N 80°14′55″W		
25	Flori-Coral Apartments		April 20, 2023 (#100008861)	1250 SW 6 St. 25°46′03″N 80°12′56″W		
26	Florida East Coast Railway Locomotive No. 153	Florida East Coast Railway Locomotive No. 153	February 21, 1985 (#85000303)	12400 Southwest 152nd Street; 25°37′15″N 80°24′22″W		
27	Freedom Tower	Freedom Tower	September 10, 1979 (#79000665)	600 Biscayne Boulevard; 25°46′48″N 80°11′23″W		
28	Gesu Church	Gesu Church	July 18, 1974 (#74000617)	118 Northeast 2nd Street; 25°46′32″N 80°11′31″W		
29	Greater Bethel AME Church	Greater Bethel AME Church	April 17, 1992 (#88002987)	245 Northwest 8th Street; 25°46′54″N 80°11′57″W		Part of the Downtown Miami MRA
30	Grove Park Historic District		December 8, 2023 (#100008869)	Bounded by NW 17th Ave., FL 836, NW 14th Ct., and NW 7th St. 25°46′53″N 80°13′16″W		
31	Hahn Building	Hahn Building	January 4, 1989 (#88002989)	140 Northeast 1st Avenue; 25°46′32″N 80°11′32″W		Part of the Downtown Miami MRA
32	HALF MOON (shipwreck)	HALF MOON (shipwreck)	May 31, 2001 (#01000531)	Outside Bear Cut off Key Biscayne; 25°43′39″N 80°08′04″W		
33	Halissee Hall	Halissee Hall	October 1, 1974 (#74000618)	1700 Northwest 10th Avenue; 25°47′17″N 80°12′53″W		
34	Hampton House Motel		February 7, 2022 (#100007393)	4240 NW 27th Ave. 25°48′51″N 80°14′26″W		
35	Huntington Building	Huntington Building	January 4, 1989 (#88002976)	168 Southeast 1st Street; 25°46′28″N 80°11′27″W		Part of the Downtown Miami MRA
36	Ingraham Building	Ingraham Building	January 4, 1989 (#88002958)	25 Southeast 2nd Avenue; 25°46′23″N 80°11′25″W		Part of the Downtown Miami MRA
37	Dr. James M. Jackson Office	Dr. James M. Jackson Office	February 24, 1975 (#75000550)	190 Southeast 12th Terrace; 25°45′39″N 80°11′25″W		
38	The Kampong	The Kampong	March 1, 1984 (#84000837)	Address Restricted; 25°43′01″N 80°15′11″W		
39	Kentucky Home	Kentucky Home	January 4, 1989 (#88002969)	1221 and 1227 Northeast 1st Avenue; 25°47′10″N 80°11′31″W		Part of the Downtown Miami MRA
40	Lincoln Memorial Park Cemetery	Lincoln Memorial Park Cemetery	March 29, 2018 (#100002292)	3001 NW 46th St; 25°48′59″N 80°14′42″W		
41	Lummus Park Historic District	Lummus Park Historic District	October 25, 2006 (#06000952)	Roughly bounded by Northwest Second Street, Northwest Third Court, Northwest Fourth Street, and Northwest North River Drive; 25°46′37″N 80°12′04″W		
42	Lyric Theater	Lyric Theater	January 4, 1989 (#88002965)	819 Northwest 2nd Avenue; 25°46′55″N 80°11′53″W		Part of the Downtown Miami MRA
43	Martina Apartments	Martina Apartments	January 4, 1989 (#88002981)	1023 South Miami Avenue; 25°45′49″N 80°11′35″W		Part of the Downtown Miami MRA
44	Masjid al-Ansar		January 14, 2026 (#100012555)	5245 NW 7th Avenue; 25°49′26″N 80°12′28″W		
45	Meyer-Kiser Building	Meyer-Kiser Building	January 4, 1989 (#88002991)	139 Northeast 1st Building; 25°46′30″N 80°11′29″W		Part of the Downtown Miami MRA
46	Miami Black Police Precinct and Courthouse	Miami Black Police Precinct and Courthouse	February 5, 2020 (#100004974)	480 NW 11th St. 25°47′04″N 80°12′10″W		
47	Miami City Hospital, Building No. 1	Miami City Hospital, Building No. 1	December 31, 1979 (#79000666)	1611 Northwest 12th Avenue; 25°47′29″N 80°12′45″W		
48	Miami Edison Senior High School	Miami Edison Senior High School	June 5, 1986 (#86001212)	6101 Northwest Second Avenue; 25°49′53″N 80°12′00″W		
49	Miami Marine Stadium	Miami Marine Stadium	April 2, 2018 (#100002293)	3501 Rickenbacker Causeway; 25°44′35″N 80°10′12″W		
50	Miami Senior High School	Miami Senior High School	June 18, 1990 (#90000881)	2450 Southwest First Street; 25°46′17″N 80°14′10″W		
51	Miami Women's Club	Miami Women's Club	December 27, 1974 (#74002257)	1737 North Bayshore Drive; 25°47′30″N 80°11′10″W		
52	Mount Zion Baptist Church	Mount Zion Baptist Church	December 29, 1988 (#88003059)	301 Northwest 9th Street; 25°46′58″N 80°11′59″W		Part of the Downtown Miami MRA
53	Ralph M. Munroe House	Ralph M. Munroe House	April 11, 1973 (#73000575)	3485 Main Highway; 25°43′28″N 80°14′33″W		
54	Naval Air Station Richmond Headquarters Building	Naval Air Station Richmond Headquarters Building	May 1, 2017 (#100000933)	12450 SW. 152nd St. 25°37′37″N 80°23′32″W		
55	Old US Post Office and Courthouse	Old US Post Office and Courthouse	January 4, 1989 (#88002962)	100–118 Northeast 1st Avenue; 25°46′31″N 80°11′33″W		Part of the Downtown Miami MRA
56	Olympia Theater and Office Building	Olympia Theater and Office Building	March 8, 1984 (#84000839)	174 East Flager Street; 25°46′25″N 80°11′27″W		
57	Palm Cottage	Palm Cottage	January 4, 1989 (#88002957)	60 Southeast 4th Street; 25°46′14″N 80°11′33″W		Part of the Downtown Miami MRA
58	Pan American Airways Historic District		December 29, 2025 (#100012466)	4900, 5000, and 5050 NW 36 Street; 25°48′24″N 80°16′36″W		
59	Pan American Seaplane Base and Terminal Building	Pan American Seaplane Base and Terminal Building	February 20, 1975 (#75000548)	3500 Pan American Drive; 25°43′40″N 80°14′03″W		
60	Plymouth Congregational Church	Plymouth Congregational Church	July 23, 1974 (#74000615)	3429 Devon Road; 25°43′19″N 80°14′18″W		
61	Ransom School "Pagoda"	Ransom School "Pagoda"	July 25, 1973 (#73000572)	3575 Main Highway; 25°43′21″N 80°14′04″W		
62	Richmond Heights Pioneer Historic District		March 25, 2019 (#100003405)	14520-14960 Monroe St. 25°37′53″N 80°22′26″W		
63	S & S Sandwich Shop	S & S Sandwich Shop	January 4, 1989 (#88002994)	1757 Northeast 2nd Street; 25°47′33″N 80°11′28″W		Part of the Downtown Miami MRA
64	St. John's Baptist Church	St. John's Baptist Church	April 17, 1992 (#88002970)	1328 Northwest 3rd Avenue; 25°47′13″N 80°12′01″W		Part of the Downtown Miami MRA
65	Sears, Roebuck and Company Department Store	Sears, Roebuck and Company Department Store	August 8, 1997 (#84003903)	1300 Biscayne Boulevard; 25°47′14″N 80°11′24″W		Only a tower building survives, as part of Adrienne Arsht Center for the Performing Arts
66	Security Building	Security Building	January 4, 1989 (#88002990)	117 Northeast 1st Avenue; 25°46′31″N 80°11′31″W		Part of the Downtown Miami MRA
67	Shoreland Arcade	Shoreland Arcade	January 4, 1989 (#88002992)	120 Northeast 1st Street; 25°46′28″N 80°11′29″W		Part of the Downtown Miami MRA
68	South River Drive Historic District	South River Drive Historic District	August 10, 1987 (#87000671)	428 and 438 Southwest First Street, 437 Southwest Second Street, and 104, 109, and 118 Southwest South River Drive; 25°46′20″N 80°12′06″W		
69	Southside School	Southside School	January 4, 1989 (#88002980)	45 Southwest 13th Street; 25°45′41″N 80°11′58″W		Part of the Downtown Miami MRA
70	Trapp Homestead	Trapp Homestead	November 10, 1994 (#94001279)	2521 South Bayshore Drive; 25°44′01″N 80°14′17″W		
71	Trinity Episcopal Cathedral	Trinity Episcopal Cathedral	October 10, 1980 (#80000945)	464 Northeast 16th Street; 25°47′24″N 80°11′12″W		
72	U.S. Car No. 1	U.S. Car No. 1	August 24, 1977 (#77000401)	3398 Southwest 9th Avenue; 25°37′02″N 80°24′02″W		
73	US Coast Guard Air Station Hangar at Dinner Key	US Coast Guard Air Station Hangar at Dinner Key	December 19, 2002 (#02001535)	2600 South Bayshore Drive; 25°43′51″N 80°14′04″W		
74	US Post Office and Courthouse	US Post Office and Courthouse	October 14, 1983 (#83003518)	300 Northeast 1st Avenue; 25°46′38″N 80°11′34″W		
75	Vagabond Motel	Vagabond Motel	December 29, 2014 (#14001086)	7301 Biscayne Blvd. 25°50′34″N 80°11′02″W		
76	Venetian Causeway	Venetian Causeway	July 13, 1989 (#89000852)	Northeast 15th Street and Dade Boulevard; 25°47′21″N 80°11′21″W		Extends into Miami Beach, elsewhere in Miami-Dade County
77	Virginia Key Beach Park	Virginia Key Beach Park	June 28, 2002 (#02000681)	East of Biscayne Bay and north of the Rickenbacker Causeway; 25°44′02″N 80°09′43″W		
78	Vizcaya	Vizcaya	September 29, 1970 (#70000181)	3251 South Miami Avenue; also roughly bounded by South Dixie Highway, Southwest 32nd Road, and South Miami Avenue; 25°44′37″N 80°12′37″W		Vizcaya was added to the National Register on September 29, 1970 (refnum 70000181), with a boundary increase on November 15, 1978 (refnum 78003193). It was made a National Historic Landmark on April 19, 1994 (refnum 70000181).
79	Walgreen Drug Store	Walgreen Drug Store	January 4, 1989 (#88002982)	200 East Flagler Street; 25°46′29″N 80°11′25″W		Part of the Downtown Miami MRA
80	J. W. Warner House	J. W. Warner House	June 1, 1983 (#83001419)	111 Southwest 5th Avenue; 25°46′24″N 80°12′10″W		
81	Woman's Club of Coconut Grove	Woman's Club of Coconut Grove	March 26, 1975 (#75000549)	2985 South Bayshore Drive; 25°43′37″N 80°14′24″W		

== Former listings ==
	Name on the Register	Image	Date listed	Date removed	Location	City or town	Description
1	Algonquin Apartments	Algonquin Apartments	January 4, 1989 (#88002985)	July 24, 2018	1819–1825 Biscayne Boulevard; 25°47′37″N 80°11′20″W		Part of the Downtown Miami MRA
2	I. and E. Greenwald Steam Engine No. 1058	I. and E. Greenwald Steam Engine No. 1058	March 12, 1987 (#87002197)	July 24, 2018	3898 Shipping Avenue; 25°43′57″N 80°15′27″W		
3	J & S Building	J & S Building	January 4, 1989 (#88002967)	January 14, 2026	221–233 Northwest 9th Street; 25°46′55″N 80°11′53″W		Part of the Downtown Miami MRA
4	Priscilla Apartments	Priscilla Apartments	January 4, 1989 (#88002986)	July 24, 2018	318–320 Northeast 19th Street and 1845 Biscayne Boulevard; 25°47′39″N 80°11′20″W		Part of the Downtown Miami MRA

== See also ==
- List of National Historic Landmarks in Florida
- National Register of Historic Places listings in Florida
