= Kentucky (disambiguation) =

Kentucky is a state of the United States.

Kentucky may also refer to:

== Places ==
- Kentucky River in Kentucky
- Kentucky in Africa, a former settler colony of ex-slaves in West Africa
- Kentucky, New South Wales, Australia
- Kentucky Camp, Arizona
- Kentucky, Michigan, Munising Township, Michigan
- Kentucky County, Virginia, a former county
- Kentucky Township, Jefferson County, Kansas
- Kentucky Home, a historic home in Miami, Florida

== Music ==
- Kentucky (Panopticon album), 2012
- Kentucky (Black Stone Cherry album), 2016
- "Kentucky", a song by Karl Davis from Tragic Songs of Life

== Other ==
- Kentucky (film), a 1938 film
- Kentucky (horse), an American Thoroughbred racehorse
- Kentucky Wildcats, the intercollegiate athletic teams of the University of Kentucky
- USS Kentucky, the name of several ships
- Kentucky Rifle (or long rifle), a type of old, muzzle loaded rifles
- Kentucky Derby, an annual horse race at Churchill Downs, Kentucky
- Kentucky (steamboat), built in the 1850s
