= Downtown Miami Multiple Resource Area =

- U.S. National Register of Historic Places
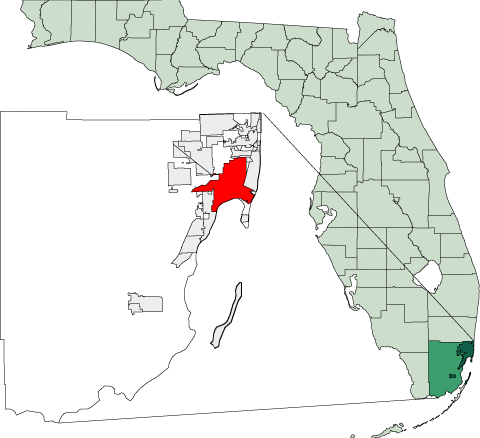
- Location: Downtown Miami, Miami-Dade County, Florida
- MPS: Downtown Miami MRA
- NRHP reference No.: 64000115
- Added to NRHP: January 4, 1989

The following buildings were added to the National Register of Historic Places as part of the Downtown Miami Multiple Resources Area, a type of Multiple Property Submission (MPS).

Additional buildings were also covered in the study of Downtown Miami historic resources, but were not NRHP-listed due to owner objections at the time. These include the Art Deco, 1930-built Shrine Building (Miami, Florida) and the Sears, Roebuck and Company Department Store (Miami, Florida). The latter was the first-built Art Deco building in the county, built in 1929, and it was later NRHP-listed.

Resource Name	Also known as	Address	City	County	Added
Algonquin Apartments		1819-1825 Biscayne Boulevard	Miami	Miami-Dade County	January 4, 1989
Atlantic Gas Station		668 Northwest 5th Street	Miami	Miami-Dade County	December 29, 1988
Brickell Mausoleum		501 Brickell Avenue	Miami	Miami-Dade County	January 4, 1989
Central Baptist Church		500 Northeast 1st Avenue	Miami	Miami-Dade County	January 4, 1989
City National Bank Building		121 Southeast 1st Street	Miami	Miami-Dade County	January 4, 1989
City of Miami Cemetery		1800 Northeast 2nd Avenue	Miami	Miami-Dade County	January 4, 1989
Dade County Courthouse		73 West Flagler Street	Miami	Miami-Dade County	January 4, 1989
D. A. Dorsey House		250 Northwest 9th Street	Miami	Miami-Dade County	January 4, 1989
Alfred I. DuPont Building		169 East Flagler Street	Miami	Miami-Dade County	January 4, 1989
Fire Station No. 2		1401 North Miami Avenue	Miami	Miami-Dade County	January 4, 1989
Greater Bethel AME Church		245 Northwest 8th Street	Miami	Miami-Dade County	April 17, 1992
Hahn Building		140 Northeast 1st Avenue	Miami	Miami-Dade County	January 4, 1989
Huntington Building		168 Southeast 1st Street	Miami	Miami-Dade County	January 4, 1989
Ingraham Building		25 Southeast 2nd Avenue	Miami	Miami-Dade County	January 4, 1989
J & S Building		221-233 Northwest 9th Street	Miami	Miami-Dade County	January 4, 1989
Kentucky Home		1221 and 1227 Northeast 1st Avenue	Miami	Miami-Dade County	January 4, 1989
Lyric Theater		819 Northwest 2nd Avenue	Miami	Miami-Dade County	January 4, 1989
Martina Apartments		1023 South Miami Avenue	Miami	Miami-Dade County	January 4, 1989
Meyer-Kiser Building		139 Northeast 1st Building	Miami	Miami-Dade County	January 4, 1989
Mount Zion Baptist Church		301 Northwest 9th Street	Miami	Miami-Dade County	December 29, 1988
Old US Post Office and Courthouse		100-118 Northeast 1st Avenue	Miami	Miami-Dade County	January 4, 1989
Palm Cottage		60 Southeast 4th Street	Miami	Miami-Dade County	January 4, 1989
Priscilla Apartments		318-320 Northeast 19th Street and 1845 Biscayne Boulevard	Miami	Miami-Dade County	January 4, 1989
S & S Sandwich Shop		1757 Northeast 2nd Street	Miami	Miami-Dade County	January 4, 1989
Security Building		117 Northeast 1st Avenue	Miami	Miami-Dade County	January 4, 1989
Shoreland Arcade		120 Northeast 1st Street	Miami	Miami-Dade County	January 4, 1989
Southside School		45 Southwest 13th Street	Miami	Miami-Dade County	January 4, 1989
St. John's Baptist Church		1328 Northwest 3rd Avenue	Miami	Miami-Dade County	April 17, 1992
Walgreen Drug Store		200 East Flagler Street	Miami	Miami-Dade County	January 4, 1989

== See also ==
- Downtown Miami
- Downtown Miami Historic District
- National Register of Historic Places listings in Miami, Florida
