= Palm Cottage =

Palm Cottage may refer to:

- Palm Cottage Gardens, Gotha, Florida
- Palm Cottage (Miami, Florida)
- Palm Cottage (Naples, Florida)
