= Shrine Building (Miami, Florida) =

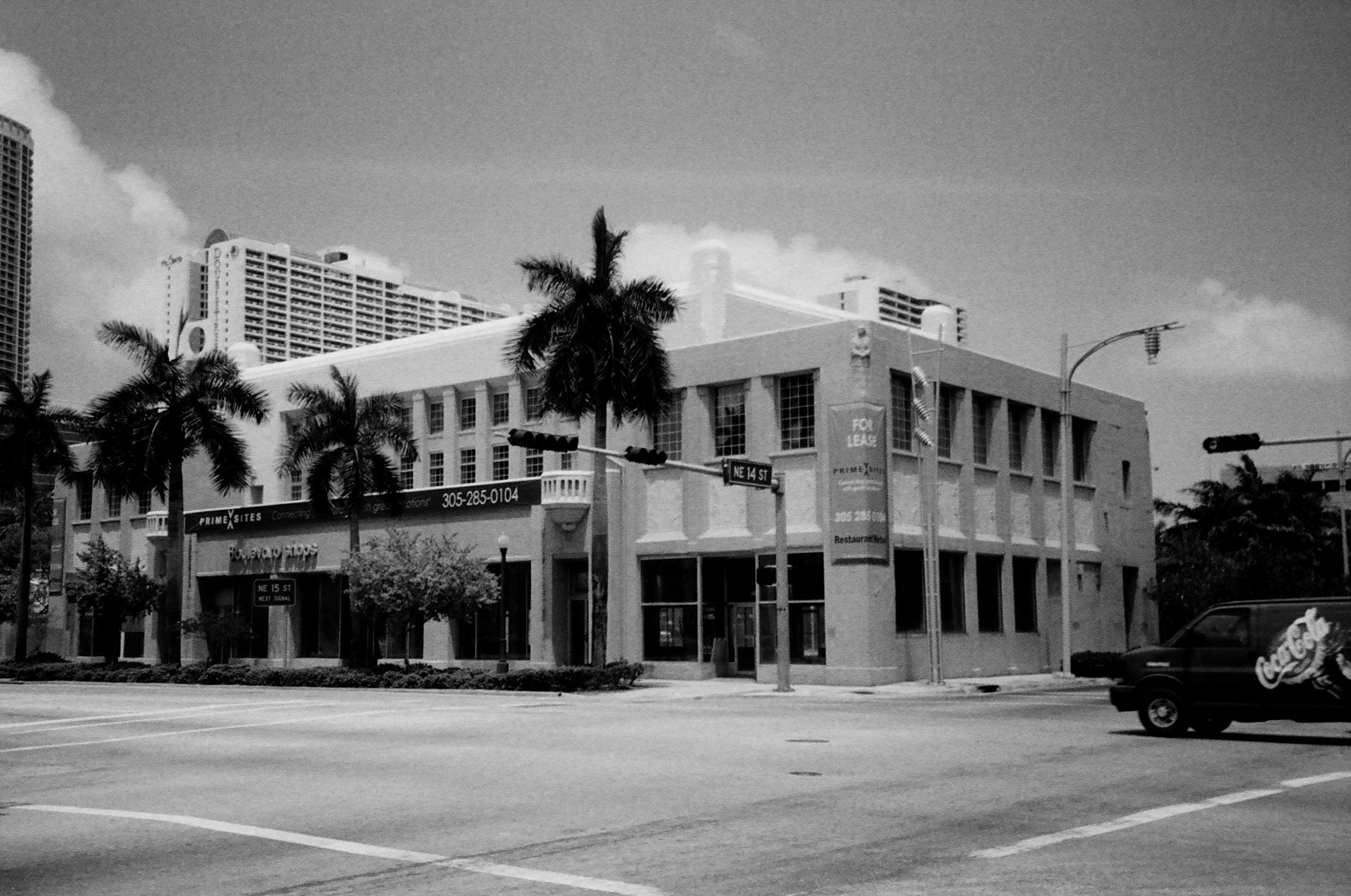

General information
- Architectural style: Art Deco
- Location: 1401–1417 Biscayne Blvd., Miami, Florida
- Completed: 1930

Technical details
- Size: 0.9 acres (0.36 ha)

Design and construction
- Architect: Robert Law Weed

The Shrine Building, also known as Boulevard Shops, is an Art Deco commercial building in Miami, Florida built in 1930. It was designed by Robert Law Weed and is an "elegant, local interpretation" of the Art Deco style including Seminole Indian motifs. The second floor was occupied by the Mahi Shriners for thirteen years, from 1930 to 1943.

The Shrine Building was part of a construction plan for Biscayne Boulevard as a high-end shopping district dubbed the "Fifth Avenue of the South." The Biscayne Boulevard Company designed the Boulevard as a self-sufficient shopping experience where the consumer could fulfill every need, as a forerunner to the modern shopping center. The Shrine Building and the surrounding shops were all built in the Art Deco style. It was covered in a study of Downtown Miami historic resources.

The Shrine Building reflects the historical, cultural, economical and social development trends of Miami during the later 1920s and early 1930s. The Shrine Building was one of many stores built by the Biscayne Boulevard Company in an effort to establish a new shopping area for the Greater Miami area.

The Sears, Roebuck and Company Department Store (Miami, Florida), built in 1929, is another Art Deco standout in the area.

This property was determined to be National Register-eligible as of January 3, 1989 (see NRIS refnum #88002997) but it was not actually listed on the National Register due to owner objection.

== See also ==
- Downtown Miami Multiple Resource Area
