= City National Bank Building (Miami, Florida) =

- U.S. National Register of Historic Places
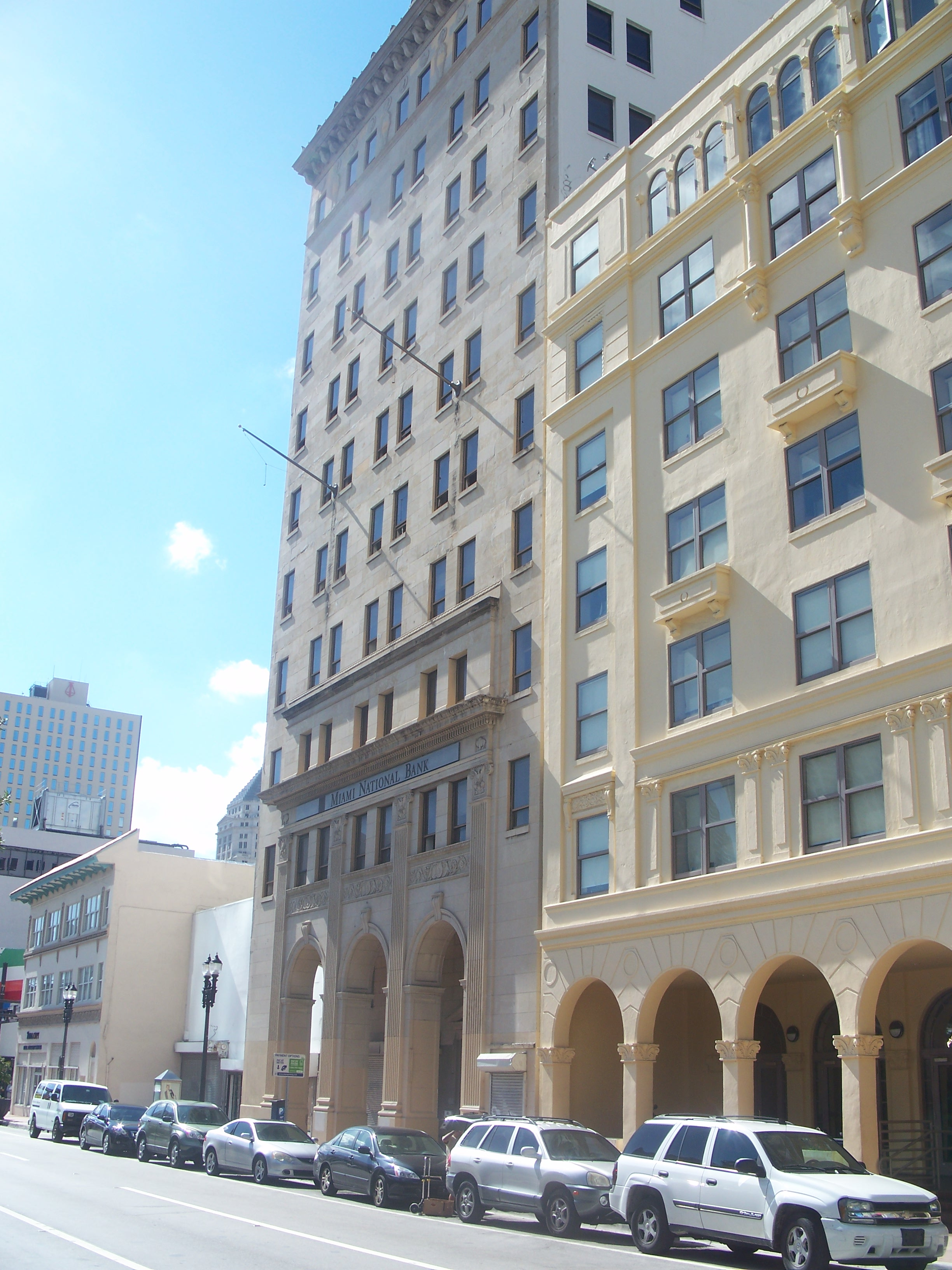

- Location within Miami Location within Florida Location within the United States
- Location: Miami, Florida
- Coordinates: 25°46′24.4344″N 80°11′29.3028″W
- Built: 1925
- Architect: Hampton and Ehmann
- MPS: Downtown Miami MRA
- NRHP reference No.: 88002975
- Added to NRHP: January 4, 1989

The City National Bank Building (also known as the Langford Building) is a historic bank building in Miami, Florida. It is located at 121 Southeast 1st Street.

== History ==
Construction of building was completed shortly before the 1926 Miami hurricane, which ended the early-1920s real estate boom in Miami.

Film producer Louis B. Mayer owned the building from 1952 until his death in 1959.

On January 4, 1989, the building was added to the National Register of Historic Places as the "City National Bank Building".

In 2012, the building was sold and renovated to become a boutique Langford Hotel.
