= Huntington Building =

- U.S. National Register of Historic Places
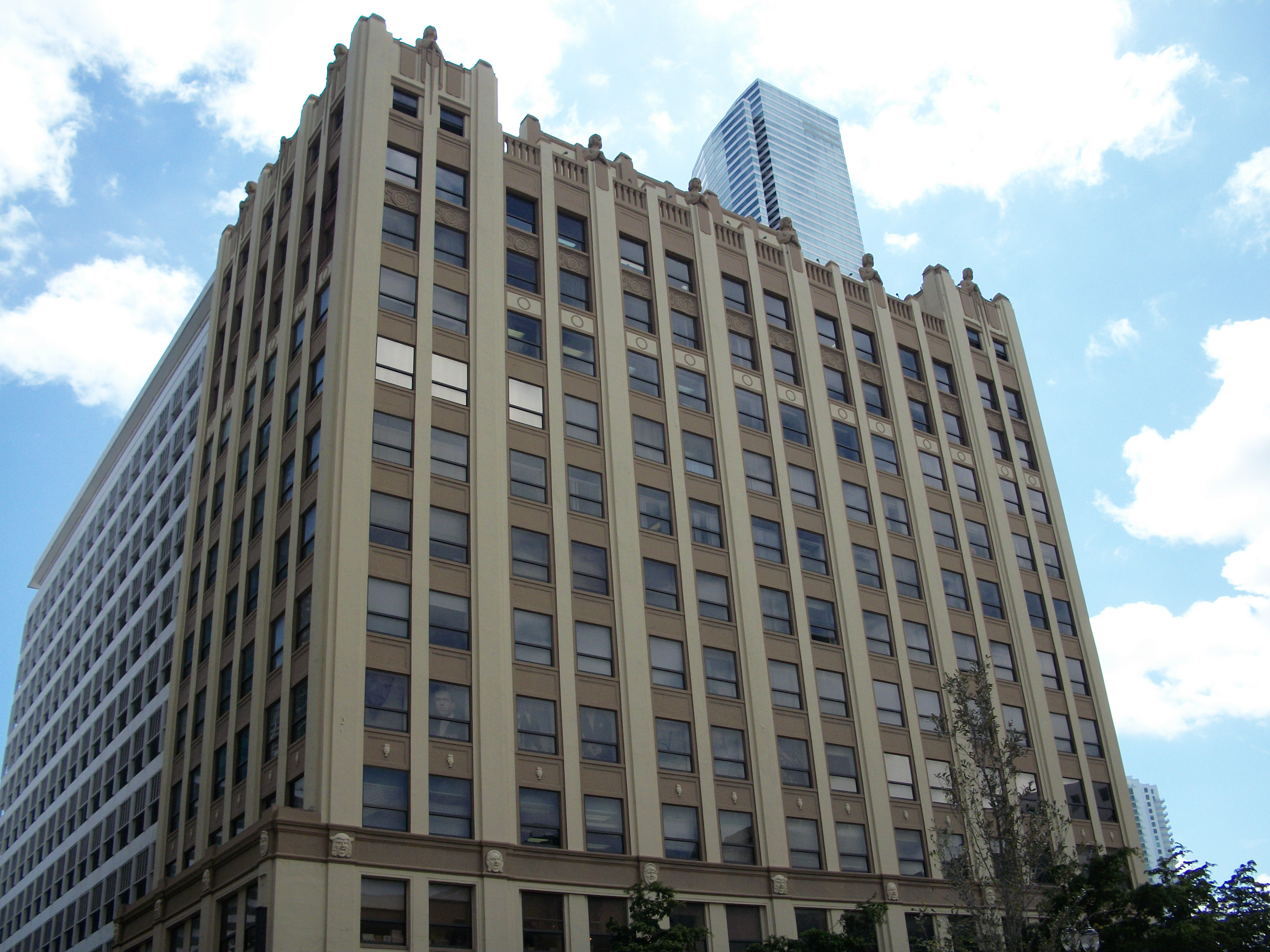

- Location within Miami Location within Florida Location within the United States
- Location: Miami, Florida
- Coordinates: 25°46′24″N 80°11′25.5948″W
- MPS: Downtown Miami MRA
- NRHP reference No.: 88002976
- Added to NRHP: January 4, 1989

The Huntington Building (also known as the Consolidated Bank Building) is a historic site in Miami, Florida. It is located at 168 Southeast 1st Street. On January 4, 1989, it was added to the U.S. National Register of Historic Places.

In March 2023, inspectors ruled the building to be unsafe, and ordered evacuation of tenants.
