= Martina Apartments =

- U.S. National Register of Historic Places
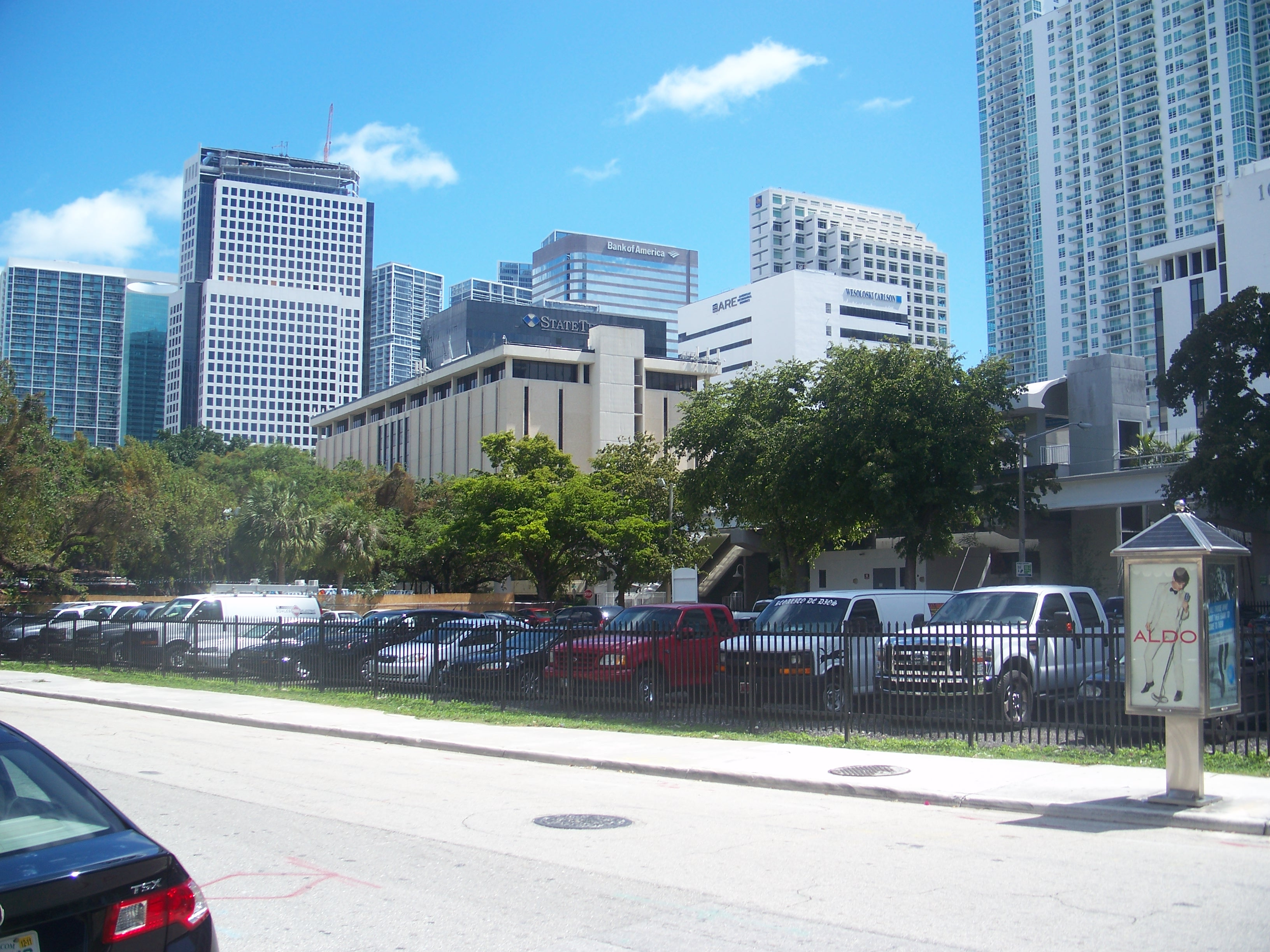

- Location within Miami Location within Florida Location within the United States
- Location: Miami, Florida
- Coordinates: 25°45′49″N 80°11′35″W
- MPS: Downtown Miami MRA
- NRHP reference No.: 88002981
- Added to NRHP: January 4, 1989

The Martina Apartments were a historic site in Miami, Florida. They were located at 1023 South Miami Avenue. On January 4, 1989, they were added to the U.S. National Register of Historic Places, but then they were demolished sometime before 2002.
