= Shoreland Arcade =

- U.S. National Register of Historic Places
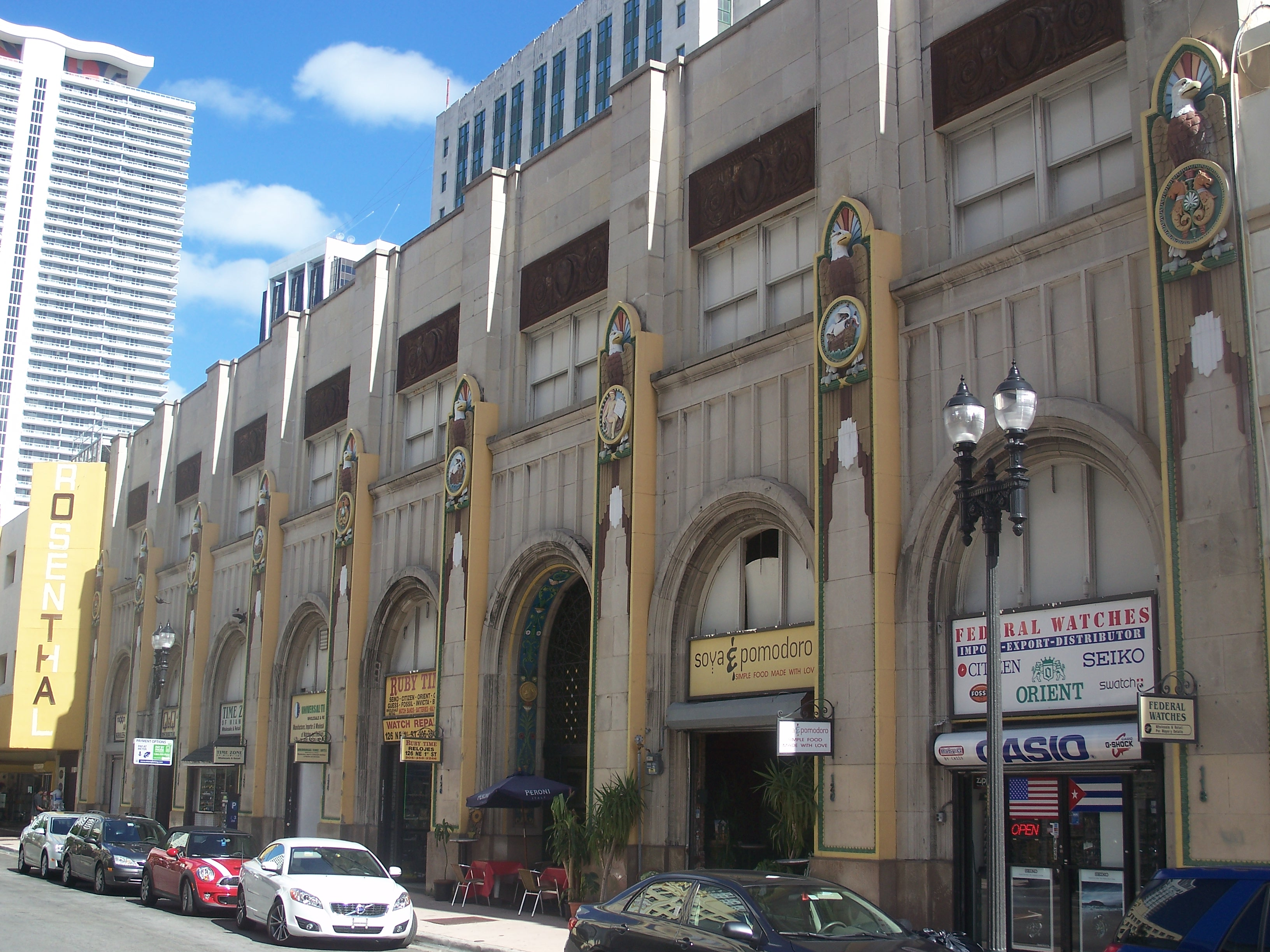

- Location within Miami Location within Florida Location within the United States
- Location: Miami, Florida
- Coordinates: 25°46′30.5544″N 80°11′28.716″W
- MPS: Downtown Miami MRA
- NRHP reference No.: 88002992
- Added to NRHP: January 4, 1989

The Shoreland Arcade (also known as the Dade Federal Savings) is a historic site in Miami, Florida. It is located at 120 Northeast 1st Street. On January 4, 1989, it was added to the U.S. National Register of Historic Places. The building opened in 1925.
