= Mount Zion Baptist Church (Miami) =

- U.S. National Register of Historic Places
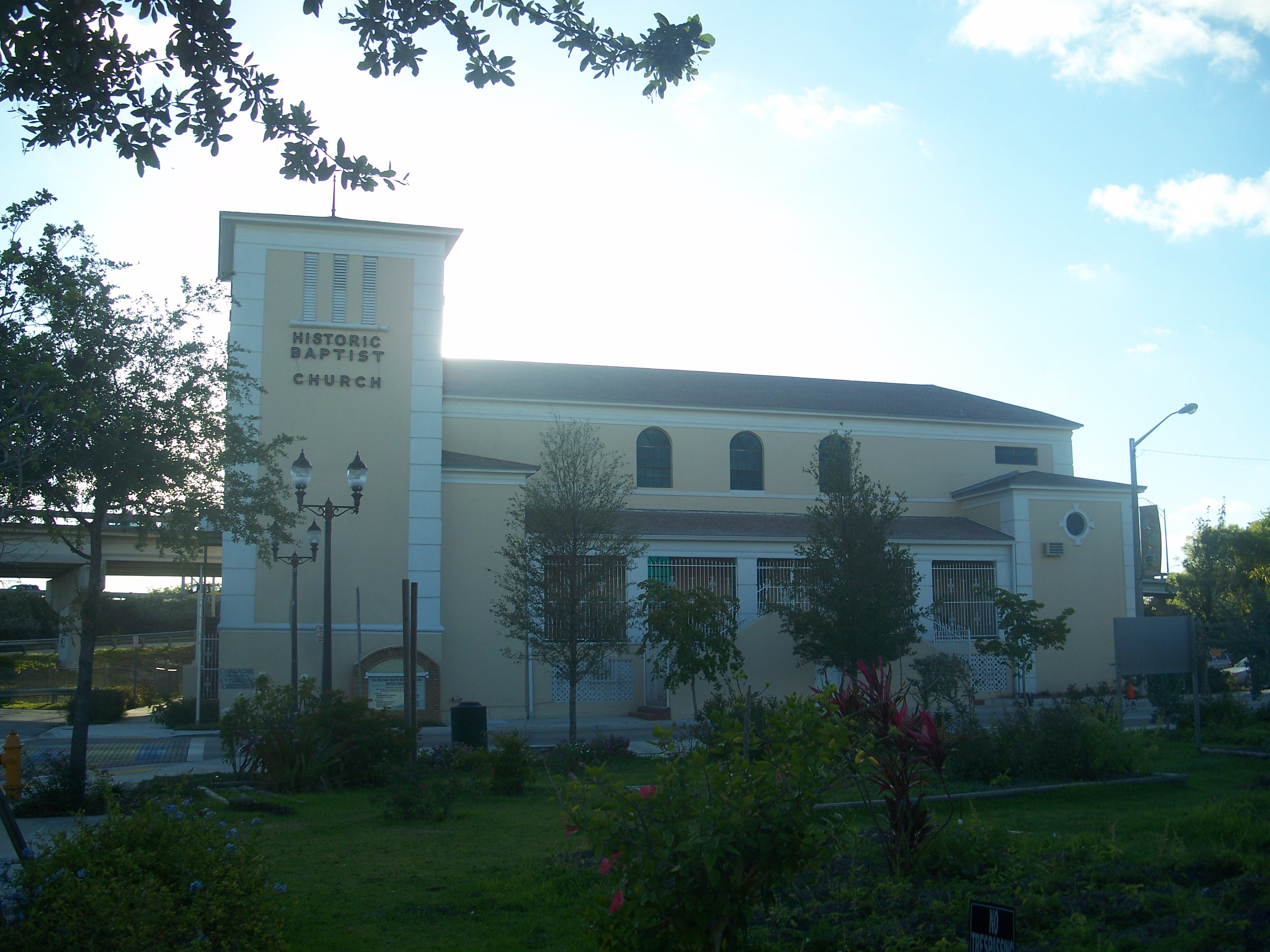

- Location within Miami Location within Florida Location within the United States
- Location: Miami, Florida
- Coordinates: 25°46′58.3536″N 80°11′59.661″W
- MPS: Downtown Miami MRA
- NRHP reference No.: 88003059
- Added to NRHP: December 29, 1988

The Mount Zion Baptist Church is a historic church in Miami, Florida. It is located at 301 Northwest 9th Street. On December 29, 1988, it was added to the U.S. National Register of Historic Places.
