= Fire Station No. 2 (Miami, Florida) =

- U.S. National Register of Historic Places
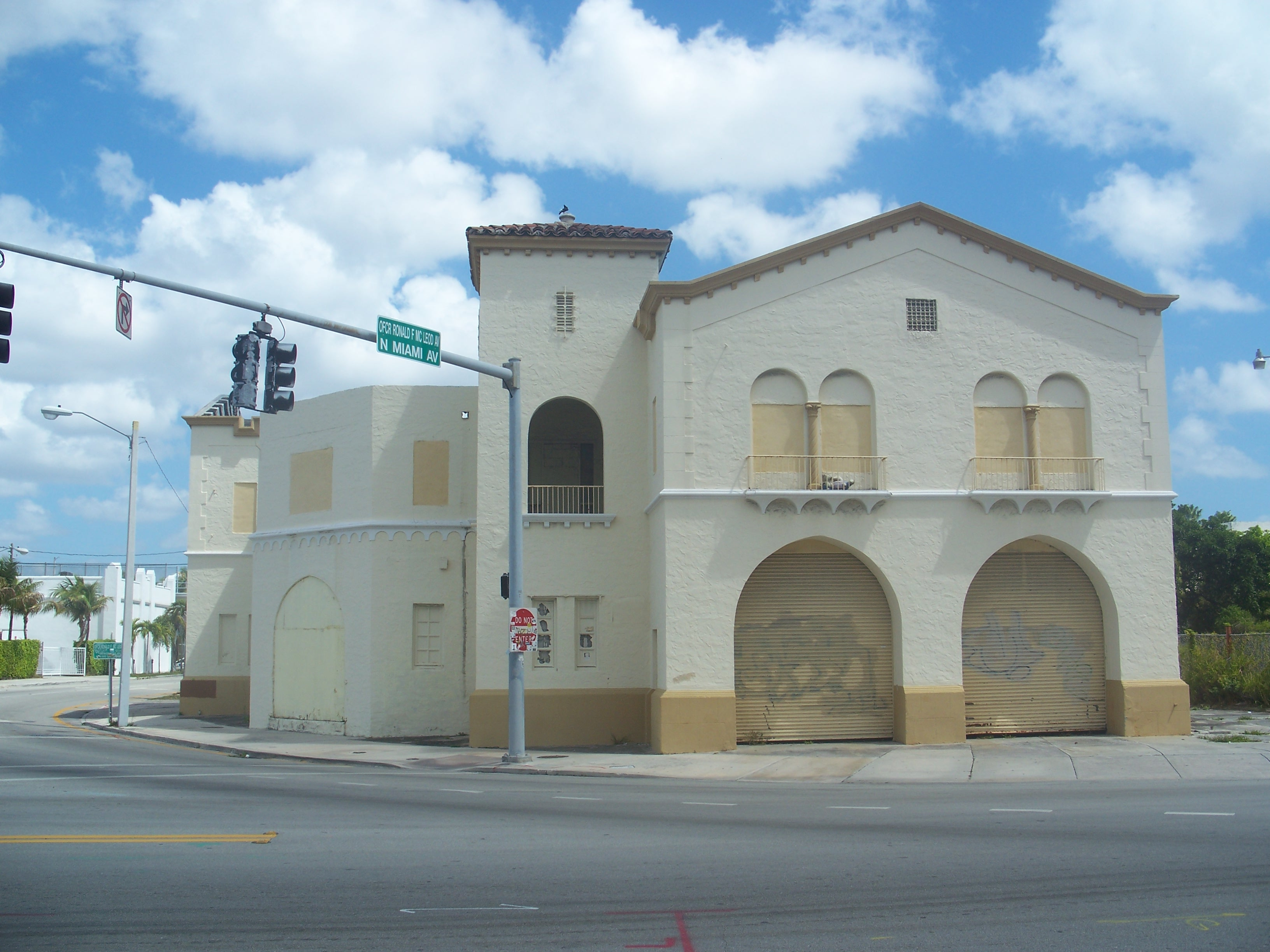

- Location within Miami Location within Florida Location within the United States
- Location: 1401 North Miami Avenue, Miami, Florida
- Coordinates: 25°47′19″N 80°11′40″W
- Area: less than one acre
- Built: 1926
- Architect: August C. Geiger
- Architectural style: Late 19th and 20th Century Revivals, Mediterranean Revival
- MPS: Downtown Miami MRA, see Downtown Miami MRA
- NRHP reference No.: 88002971
- Added to NRHP: January 4, 1989

The Fire Station No. 2 (also known as the Old Fire Station No. 2) is a historic fire station in Miami, Florida. On January 4, 1989, it was added to the U.S. National Register of Historic Places.

A proposal for it to be designated as a City of Miami historic site was prepared by the city's historic preservation program, and it was so designated.

The building is now owned by a Community Redevelopment Agency (CRA) called the Omni CRA. Ownership was transferred from the Miami. In late 2011, the Omni CRA launched a US$2M renovation in order to refurbish the building and use it as the CRA's main office. The nearby Omni Center was purchased in October 2011 by the Genting Group in an effort to establish a Las Vegas-style gambling operation. The vacant Fire Station No. 2 was constructed in 1926 by architect August C. Geiger, the tenth registered architect in Florida. The groundbreaking ceremony took place onsite on December 19, 2011.

== Gallery ==
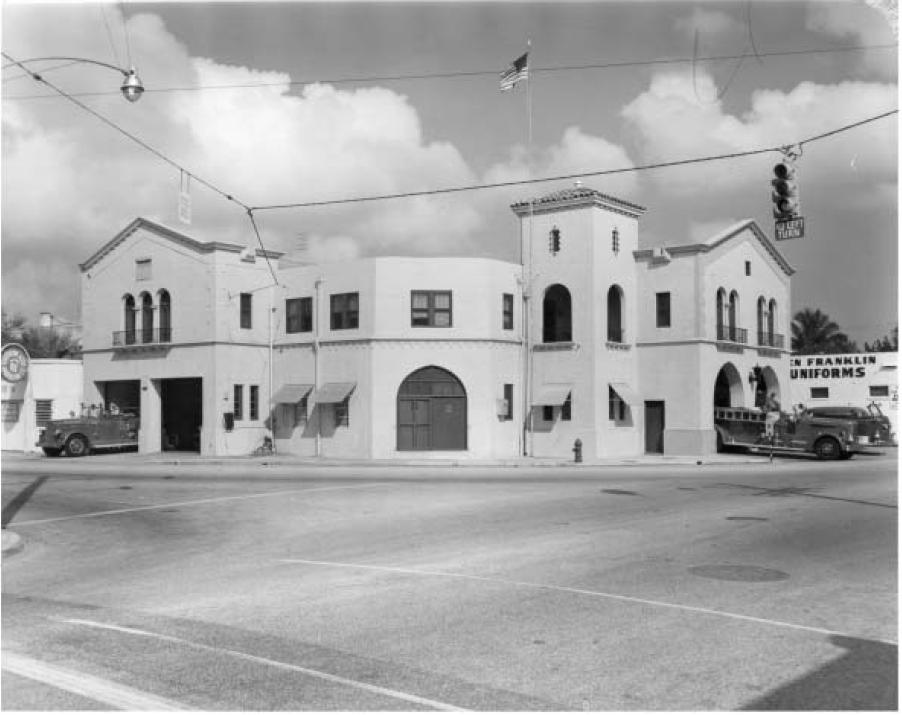
Firehouse II, Miami 1926

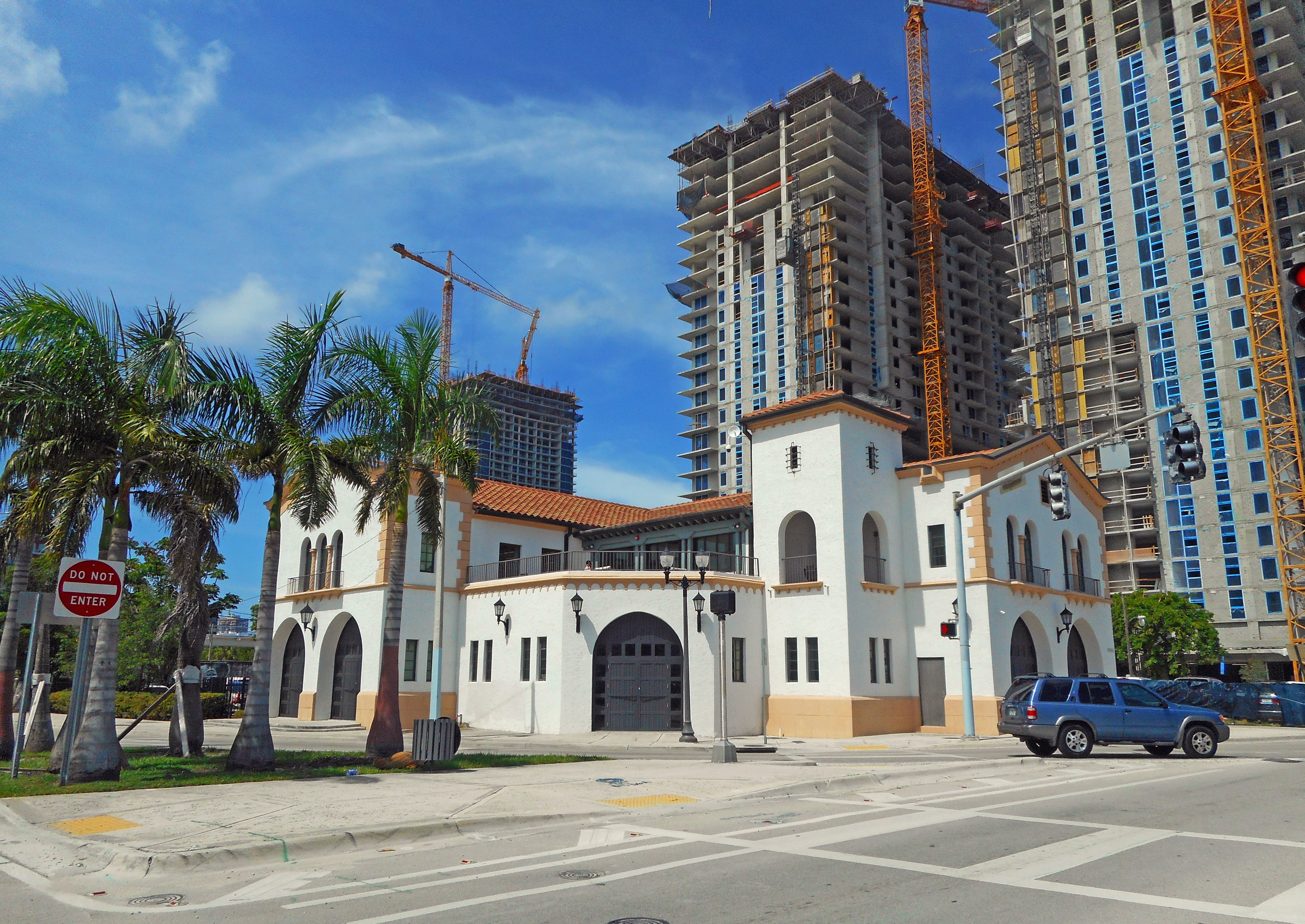
The station after renovations in 2011
