= Atlantic Gas Station =

- U.S. National Register of Historic Places
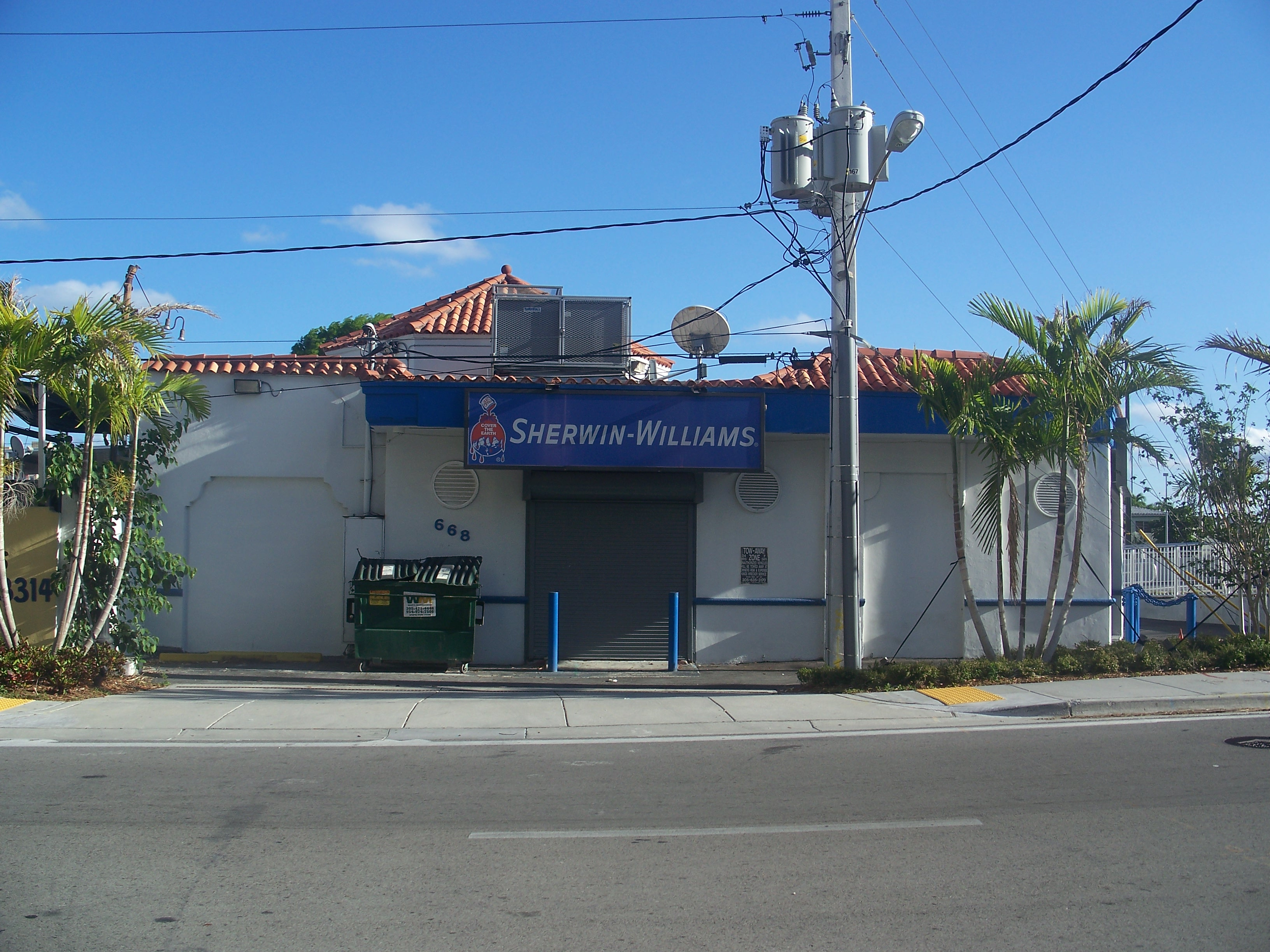

- Location within Miami Location within Florida Location within the United States
- Location: Miami, Florida
- Coordinates: 25°46′42.207″N 80°12′21.4776″W
- MPS: Downtown Miami MRA
- NRHP reference No.: 88003060
- Added to NRHP: December 29, 1988

The Atlantic Gas Station (also known as the Valiant Auto Body Shop) is a historic former gas station located at 668 Northwest 5th Street in the Overtown section of Miami, Florida. On December 29, 1988, it was added to the United States National Register of Historic Places. It was a gas station of the Atlantic Refining Company.
