= Security Building (Miami, Florida) =

- U.S. National Register of Historic Places
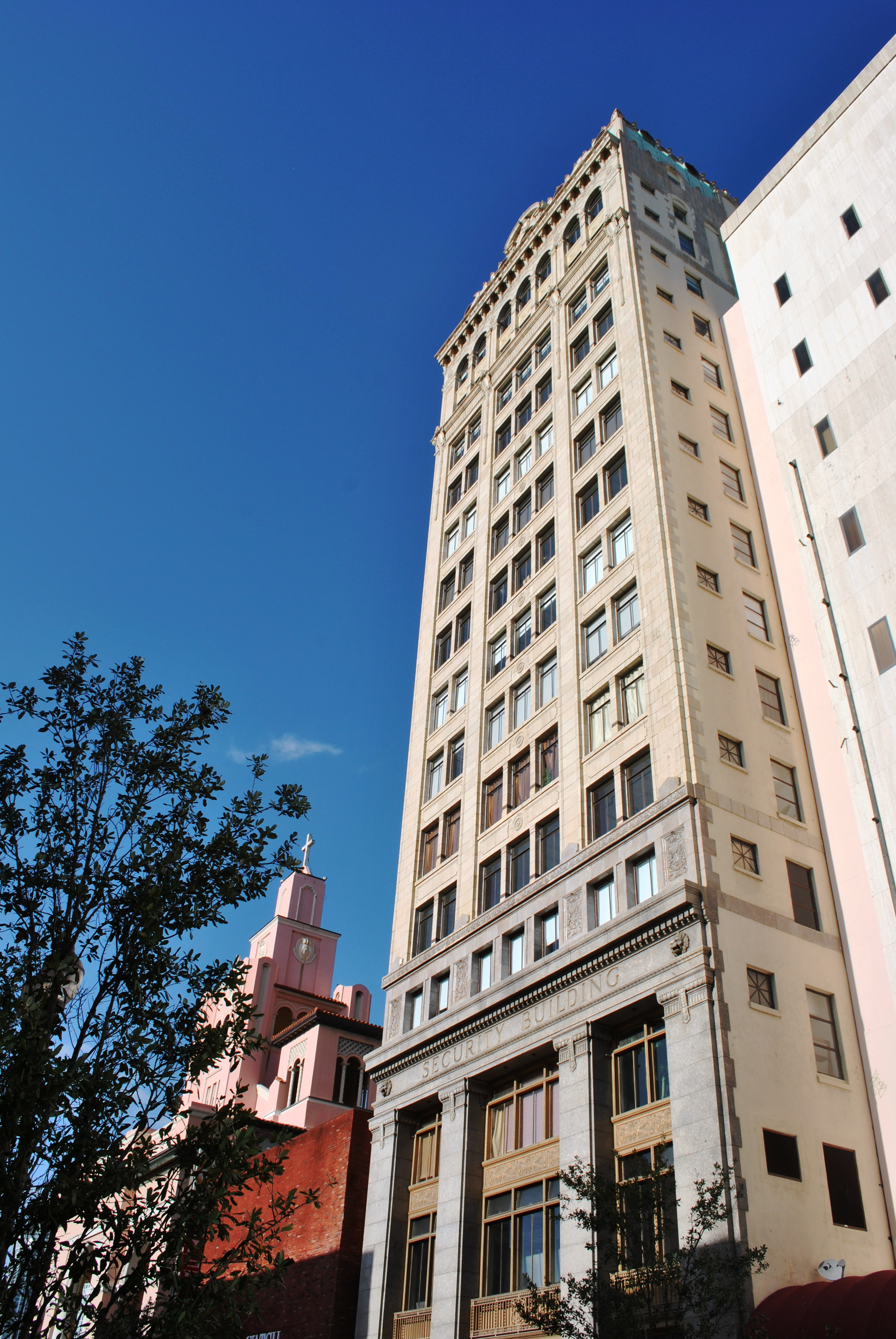

- Location within Miami Location within Florida Location within the United States
- Location: Miami, Florida
- Coordinates: 25°46′31″N 80°11′31″W
- Built: 1927
- MPS: Downtown Miami MRA
- NRHP reference No.: 88002990
- Added to NRHP: January 4, 1989

The Security Building is a historic site in Miami, Florida, United States. It is located at 117 Northeast 1st Avenue. On January 4, 1989, it was added to the U.S. National Register of Historic Places. The building has 16 floors with a height of 225 feet (69 m) and was built from 1926 to 1927.

== History ==
=== Construction for Dade County Security Company ===
The Dade County Security Company was organized in 1901 and moved to a nearby headquarters in 1923. By the mid-1920s the company needed a larger headquarters. In 1921, the Dade County Security Company had acquired the McKinnon Hotel which occupied a mid-block parcel on Northeast 1st Avenue and renamed it the Security Hotel. Dade Security had considered adding stories atop the hotel, but opted in 1925 to raze the hotel and construct a new headquarters on the same site under the direction of architect Robert Greenfield. Construction on the Security Building began in 1926. The building was known as the Security Building from its opening in 1927 until 1945. Upon opening, the first level and mezzanine were devoted to banking offices. The floors above provided 275 office suites and were reached by four "high speed" elevators.

=== Successor Banks and Office Uses ===
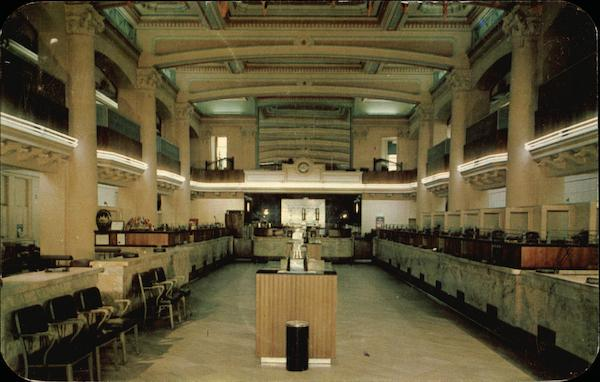
The first floor banking hall & mezzanine for the Pan American Bank of Miami. (c. 1950)

In 1945, the newly-formed Pan American Bank of Miami became the primary tenant in the building. and the structure's name was changed to the Pan American Bank Building. In September 1952, the name reverted to the Security Building when the Pan American Bank moved to a new headquarters on SE Third Avenue. The Metropolitan Bank moved in to the banking hall in 1953 and in April 1957 the name was changed to Metropolitan Bank Building.

In 1962, Capital National Bank acquired Metropolitan Bank and from 1964 until 2015, the building was referred to as the Capital Bank Building or just the Capital Building. In March 2003, the building was identified as historic by the Miami Historic and Environmental Preservation Board.

=== Capital Lofts project ===
Between 2004 and 2008, the Capital Lofts project undertook the conversion of the building into office condominiums. The project was halted by the 2008 financial crisis. In 2014, the Downtown Arts and Science Salon (DASS) was founded and used the first floor as an exhibition and lecture space.

=== WeWork Security Building ===
In June 2015, the Capital Building was sold for $23.5 million and the following October WeWork agreed to lease the entire building for a term of 15 years. The building began operations as WeWork's downtown Miami flagship location in December 2017 following a $20 million dollar renovation, offering space for more than 1,200 members in a mix of private offices, 17 "nooks", 28 meeting rooms, 20 lounges, phone booths, and event space. The original first floor bank vault was converted to a "quiet room."

In early 2019, an investor group proposed purchasing the Security Building using tokenized ownership. Inveniam Capital Partners proposed a purchase price of $65.5 million, and a Dutch auction to allocate equity, in what was claimed to be "one of the largest known cryptocurrency real estate transactions of its kind." The buyer backed out of the transaction, citing problems with its senior lender and perceptions of WeWork.

== Design and appearance ==
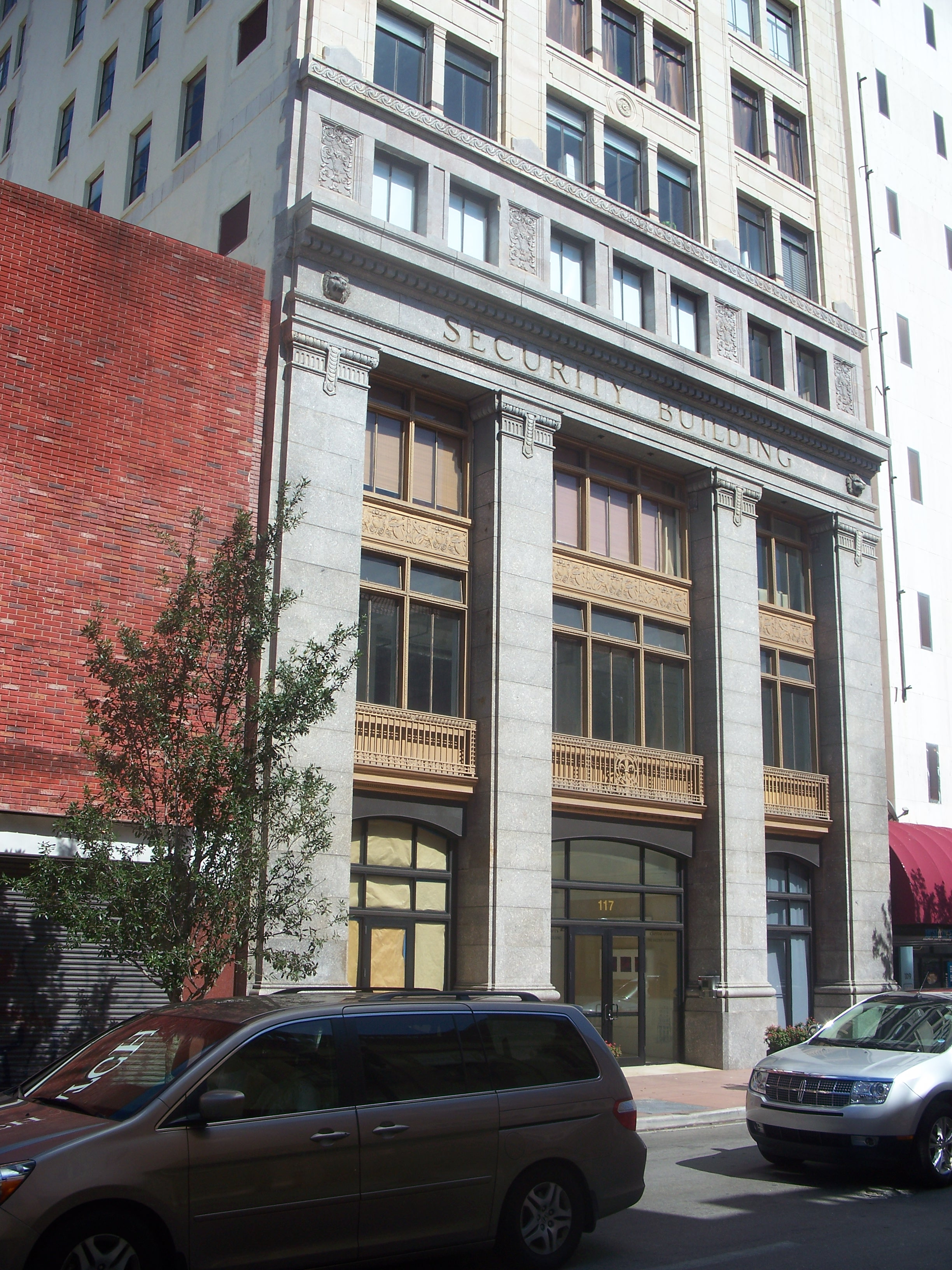
Security Building (Miami, Florida)

The Security Building faces west onto NE 1st Avenue. It is located in mid-block with buildings on either side. Those buildings are considerably shorter than the Security Building. The building maintains a zero-foot (0 m) setback, and the entry doors open directly onto the sidewalk. There are no landscape features on the property. The building is composed of a main block parallel to the street, and a second block connected perpendicularly that extends to the east.

With only a 50-foot (15 m) frontage, the architect made a grand statement by creating an almost temple-like base, consisting of the first three stories. Engaged pilasters, that also frame the center bay, articulate the corners creating three distinct bays. Spandrels between the floors are bronze and feature relief ornament. The pilasters carry the entablature, with the name “Security Building” in incised letters. A dentilled molding ornaments the cornice that terminates this division of the building.

The fourth floor begins the transition to the high-rise portion of the building. Stone panels with a similar relief accent the corners and separate the bays. Above the windows of the fourth floor is another projecting element, a stringcourse that is ornamented with a guilloche pattern in relief.

Floors five through 13 continue the three bays with window arrangements that are grouped in pairs on each of the end bays, and are grouped in three in the center bay, emphasizing the importance of the center bay to the entire composition. The windows are a metal casement type.

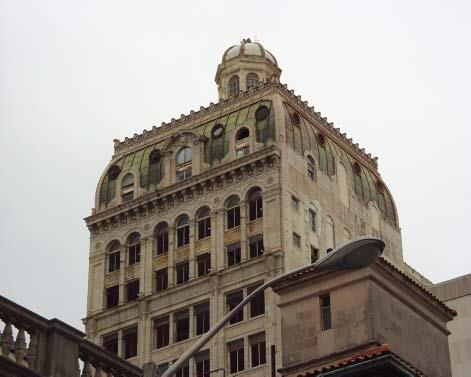
Security Building (Miami) South and West Facades, top floors with mansard roof and cupola.

The 14th and 15th floors function as the base for the great mansard roof, which terminates the building. To balance the composition, the two floors are treated as if they were one by the use of a round arch at the 15th floor that is carried by the pilasters of the 14th floor, so that the two floors are visually united.

A bracketed cornice separates the building from the roof form that is so decidedly different from roof treatments in Miami during this period. A mansard roof is a double-pitched roof with a steep upper slope. The mansard roof was named for architect Francois Mansart (1598–1666). Mansart worked in the 17th century and introduced the roof form that extended attic space to provide additional usable area. The mansard roof is a character-defining feature of the Second Empire style that was named after Napoleon III, who took on major building projects in Paris during the 18th century. The mansard roof of the Security Building is clad in copper and terminates in a series of antefixae. A series of arches containing windows and serving as dormers penetrate the roof. Bull's-eye windows are placed between the arched windows. An eight-sided cupola that extends from the center of the roof is fenestrated on each side with a multi-paned arched window. The dome of the cupola also is clad in copper.

The north and south ends of the building are not ornamented. The windows are a metal casement type. The quoining on the corners of the west elevation is repeated in the north and south elevations of the building. The extension to the east is flat-roofed, and is terminated by a defined cornice. The majority of the wall surface contains windows that are either square or rectangular in shape. They contain metal casement windows.
