= Priscilla Apartments =

- Formerly listed on the U.S. National Register of Historic Places
- Priscilla Apartments in June 1988
- Location within Miami Location within Florida Location within the United States
- Location: Miami, Florida
- Coordinates: 25°47′39″N 80°11′20″W
- Architectural style: Mediterranean Revival
- Demolished: April 2, 1996
- MPS: Downtown Miami MRA
- NRHP reference No.: 88002986

Significant dates
- Added to NRHP: January 4, 1989
- Removed from NRHP: July 24, 2018

The Priscilla Apartments were a historic site in Miami, Florida. They were built in 1925 in the Mediterranean Revival architectural style. They were located at 318-320 Northeast 19th Street and 1845 Biscayne Boulevard.

On January 4, 1989, they were added to the U.S. National Register of Historic Places. They were fully demolished on April 2, 1996, after having been partially demolished in March 1993. They were delisted in 2018.
