= Hahn Building =

- U.S. National Register of Historic Places
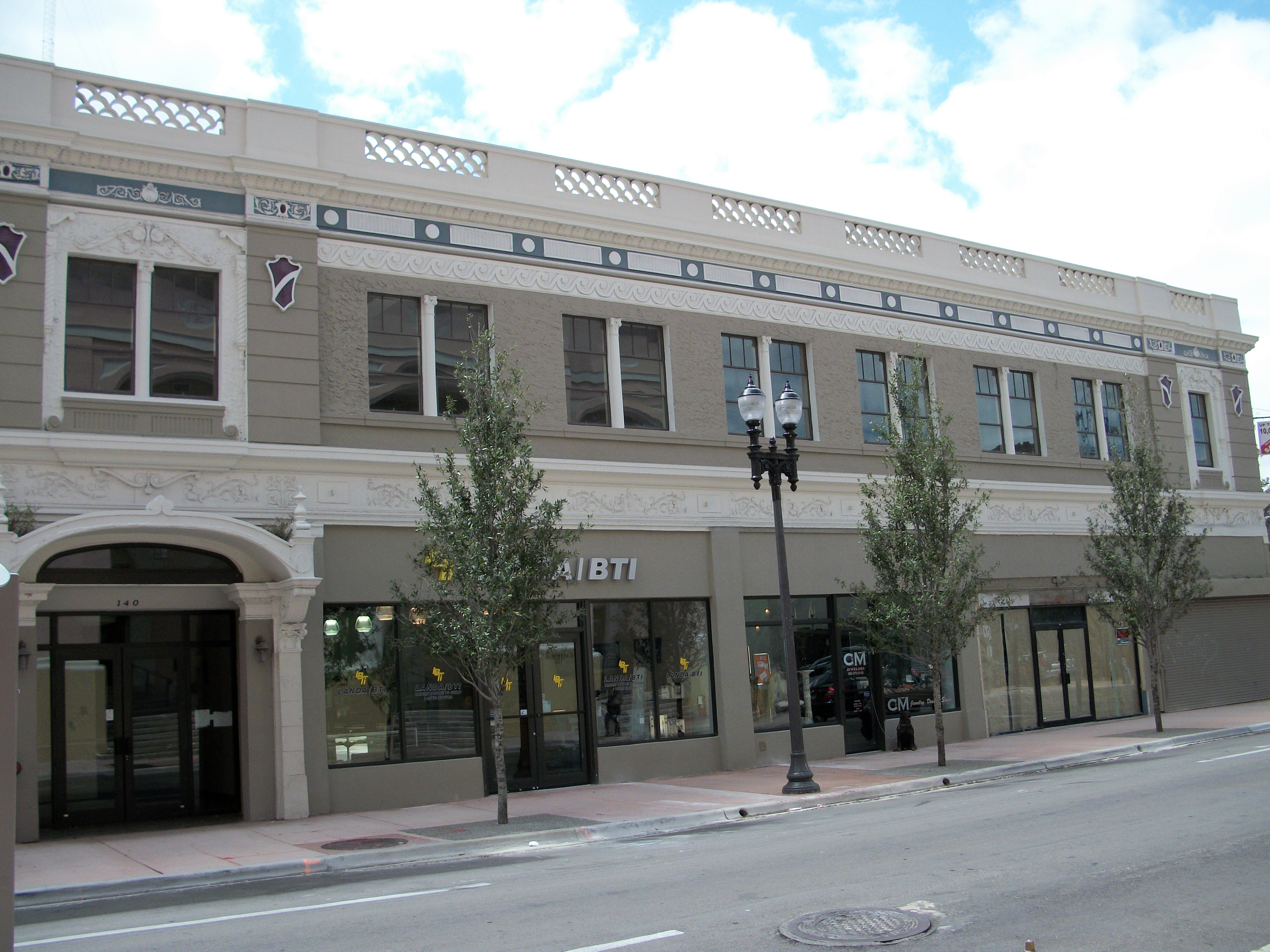

- Location within Miami Location within Florida Location within the United States
- Location: Miami, Florida
- Coordinates: 25°46′33.4086″N 80°11′31.3296″W
- MPS: Downtown Miami MRA
- NRHP reference No.: 88002989
- Added to NRHP: January 4, 1989

The Hahn Building is a historic site in Miami, Florida, United States. It is located at 140 Northeast 1st Avenue. On January 4, 1989, it was added to the U.S. National Register of Historic Places.

The building was built in 1921, and was designed by Gerald Joseph O'Reilly and George L. Pfeiffer.
