= S & S Sandwich Shop =

Historic site in Miami, Florida, United States

- U.S. National Register of Historic Places
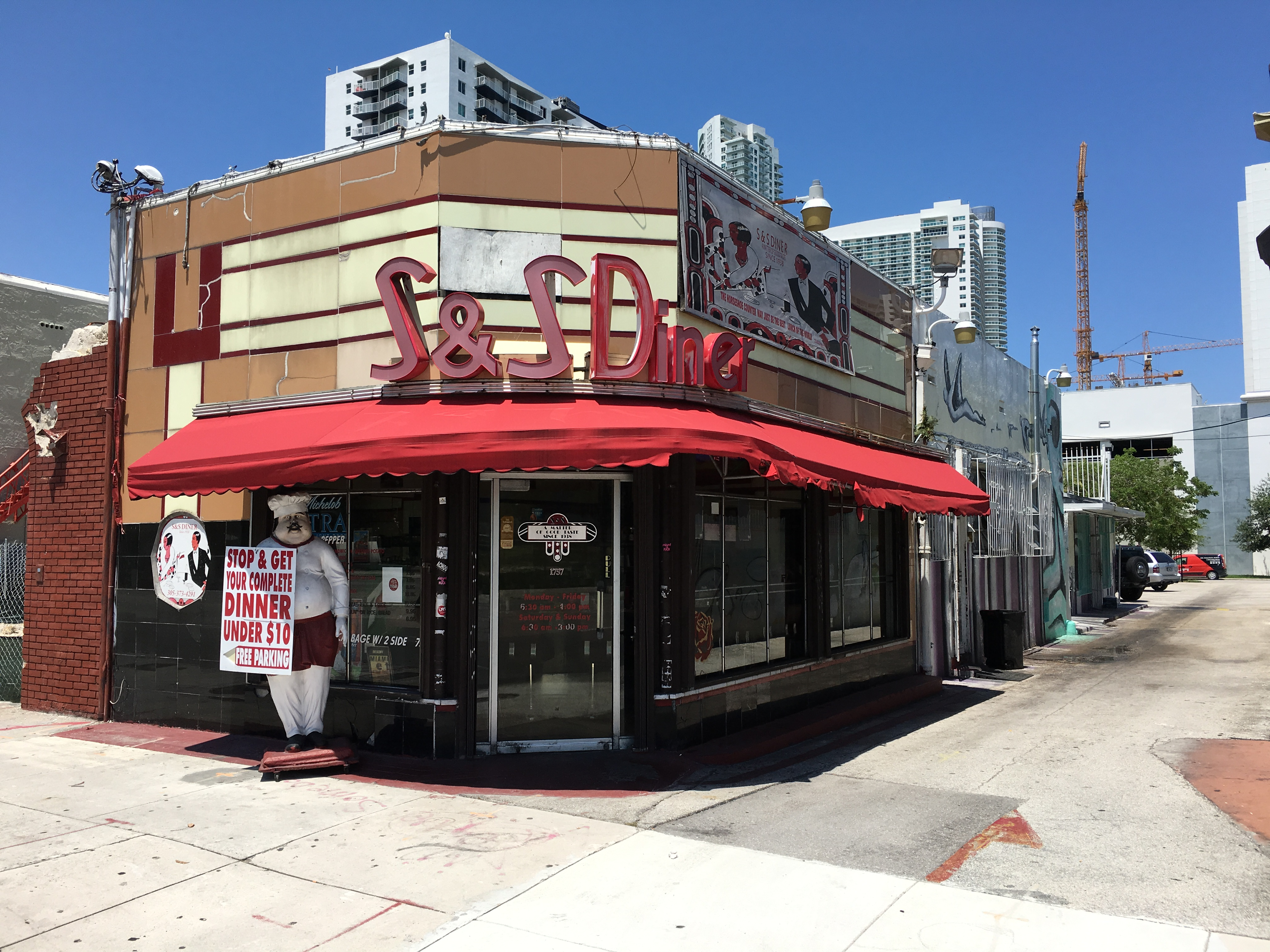

- Location within Miami Location within Florida Location within the United States
- Location: Miami, Florida
- Coordinates: 25°47′34.6344″N 80°11′26.451″W
- Architectural style: Art Deco
- MPS: Downtown Miami MRA
- NRHP reference No.: 88002994
- Added to NRHP: January 4, 1989

The S & S Sandwich Shop (also known as the S&S Diner and the S & S Restaurant) is a historic site in Miami, Florida. It is located at 1757 Northeast 2nd Avenue. On January 4, 1989, it was added to the U.S. National Register of Historic Places.

The small-scale, Art Deco building was constructed in 1938 and includes a facade of pigmented structural glass and aluminum arranged in horizontal and vertical bands of beige, white, and red.

In 2017, the restaurant was evicted from the building, and the S & S Diner resumed at a nearby location.
