= J. W. Warner House =

Historic house in Florida, United States

- U.S. National Register of Historic Places
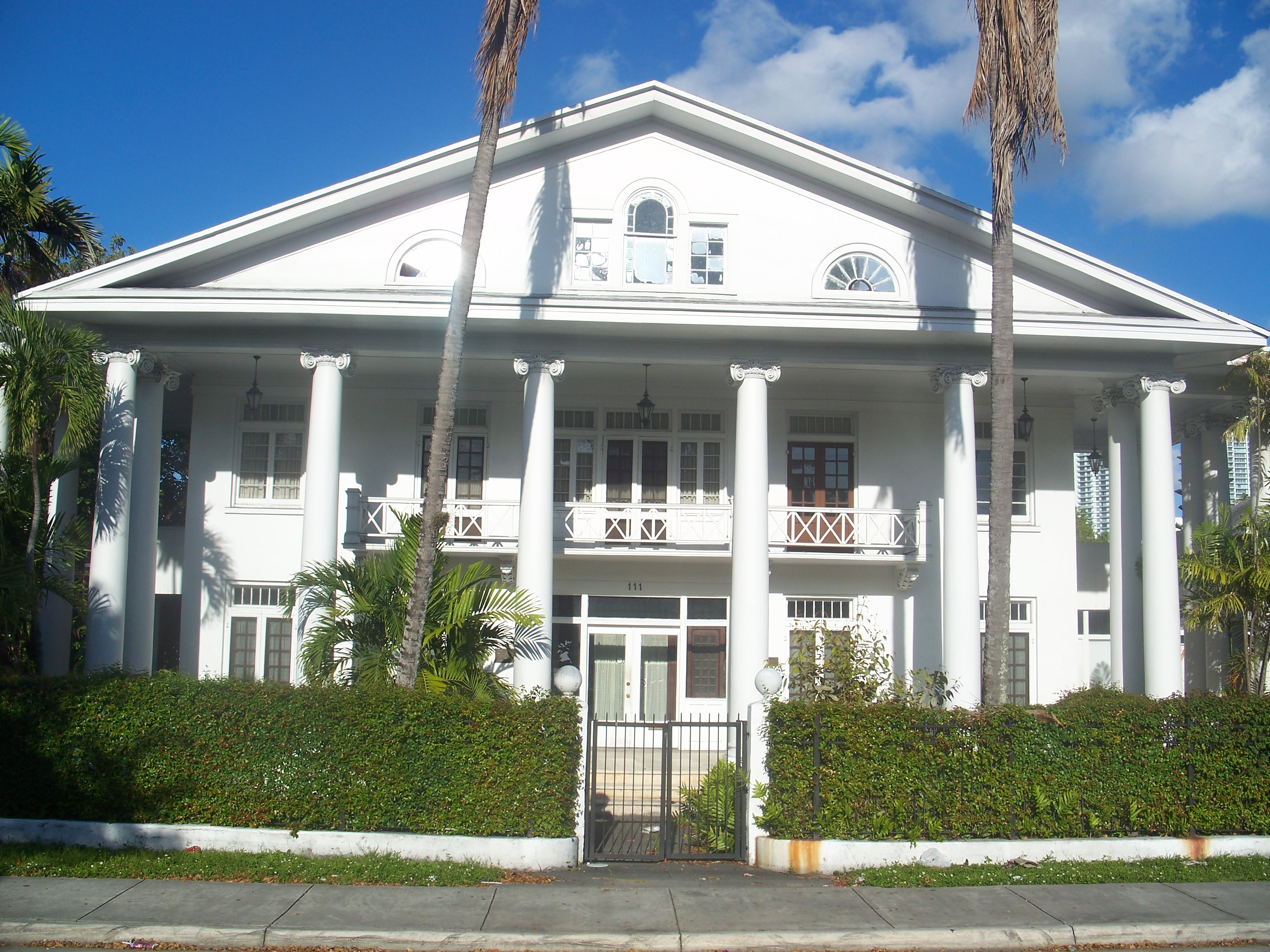

- Location within Miami Location within Florida Location within the United States
- Location: Miami, Florida
- Coordinates: 25°46′21.612″N 80°12′9.2874″W
- Architectural style: Classical Revival
- NRHP reference No.: 83001419
- Added to NRHP: June 1, 1983

The J. W. Warner House is a historic home in Miami, Florida. It is located at 111 Southwest 5th Avenue. On June 1, 1983, it was added to the U.S. National Register of Historic Places.
