= Ingraham Building =

- U.S. National Register of Historic Places
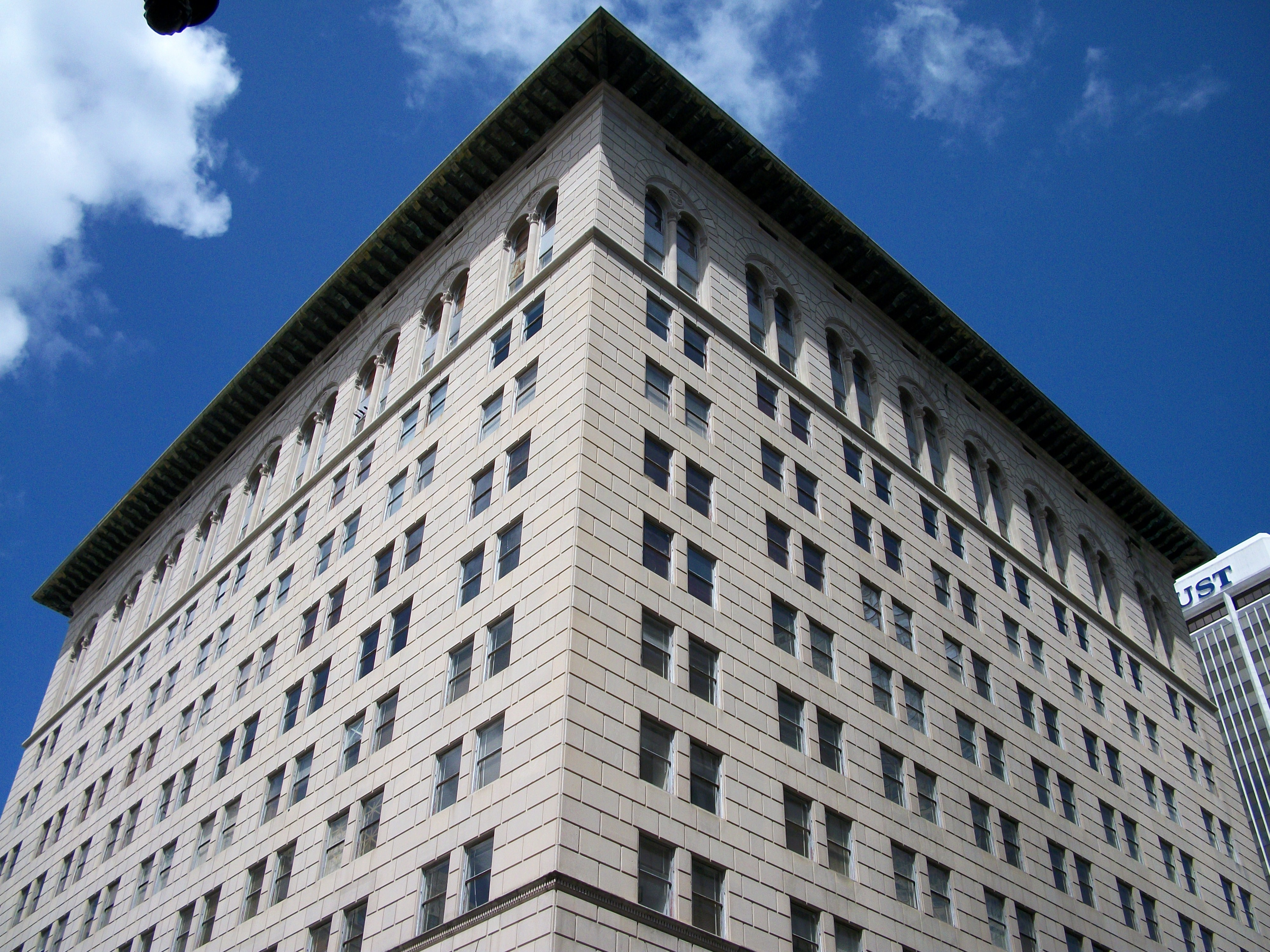

- Location within Miami Location within Florida Location within the United States
- Location: Miami, Florida
- Coordinates: 25°46′25.4892″N 80°11′24.5544″W
- MPS: Downtown Miami MRA
- NRHP reference No.: 88002958
- Added to NRHP: January 4, 1989

The Ingraham Building is a historic site in Miami, Florida. It is located at 25 Southeast 2nd Avenue. On January 4, 1989, it was added to the U.S. National Register of Historic Places.
