= USS Kentucky =

Three ships of the United States Navy (and one of the Confederate States Navy) have been named for the 15th state:

- The Mississippi Flotilla captured Confederate transport CSS Kentucky at Memphis 6 June 1862. The US Navy Register for 1863 listed her as assigned to the Mississippi Squadron but no other record of her service in the Union Navy has been found.
- USS Kentucky (BB-6) was a Kearsarge-class battleship launched 24 March 1898, sailed with the Great White Fleet and sold for scrapping 23 January 1924
- USS Kentucky (BB-66) was an Iowa-class battleship under construction in 1947 when her contract was canceled
- USS Kentucky (SSBN-737) is an Ohio-class submarine commissioned in 1991 and currently in active service

== See also ==
- USS Kentuckian
- Kentucky, a riverboat which sank near Shreveport, Louisiana in 1865 with the loss of 200 lives. See List of shipwrecks of the United States.
