= J & S Building =

- Formerly listed on the U.S. National Register of Historic Places
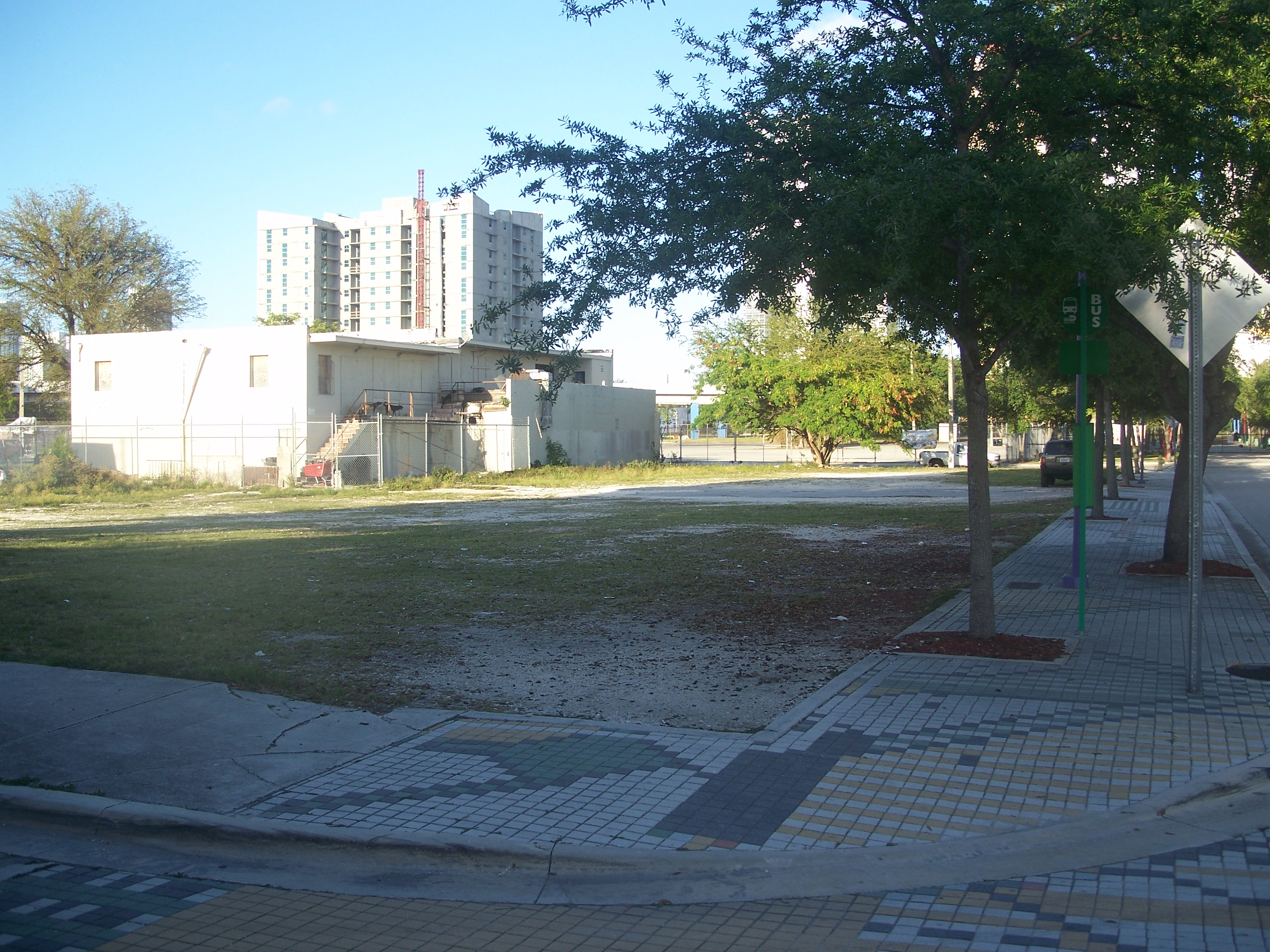

- Location within Miami Location within Florida Location within the United States
- Location: Miami, Florida
- Coordinates: 25°46′59.1378″N 80°11′53.7216″W
- MPS: Downtown Miami MRA
- NRHP reference No.: 88002967

Significant dates
- Added to NRHP: January 4, 1989
- Removed from NRHP: January 14, 2026

The J & S Building (also known as the Cola-Nip Building) is a historic site in Miami, Florida. It is located at 221-233 Northwest 9th Street. The building was constructed in 1925.

On January 4, 1989, it was added to the U.S. National Register of Historic Places. However, the building was later demolished.

== History ==
The building's owner was cited in 1976 for structural safety issues following the collapse of the Miami DEA building.
