= Algonquin Apartments =

- Formerly listed on the U.S. National Register of Historic Places
- Algonquin Apartments in June 1988
- Location within Miami Location within Florida Location within the United States
- Location: Miami, Florida
- Coordinates: 25°47′37″N 80°11′20″W
- Built: 1924
- Architectural style: Mediterranean Revival
- Demolished: March 12, 1993
- MPS: Downtown Miami MRA
- NRHP reference No.: 88002985

Significant dates
- Added to NRHP: January 4, 1989
- Removed from NRHP: July 24, 2018

The Algonquin Apartments were a historic site in Miami, Florida. Built in 1924, they were designed in the Mediterranean Revival style. In 1927, the building received a new facade which incorporated two stores on the first floor. They were located at 1819-1825 Biscayne Boulevard.

On January 4, 1989, they were added to the United States National Register of Historic Places. They were later demolished on March 12, 1993, eventually being delisted in 2018.
