= Greater Bethel AME Church (Miami) =

Historic church in Florida, United States

- U.S. National Register of Historic Places
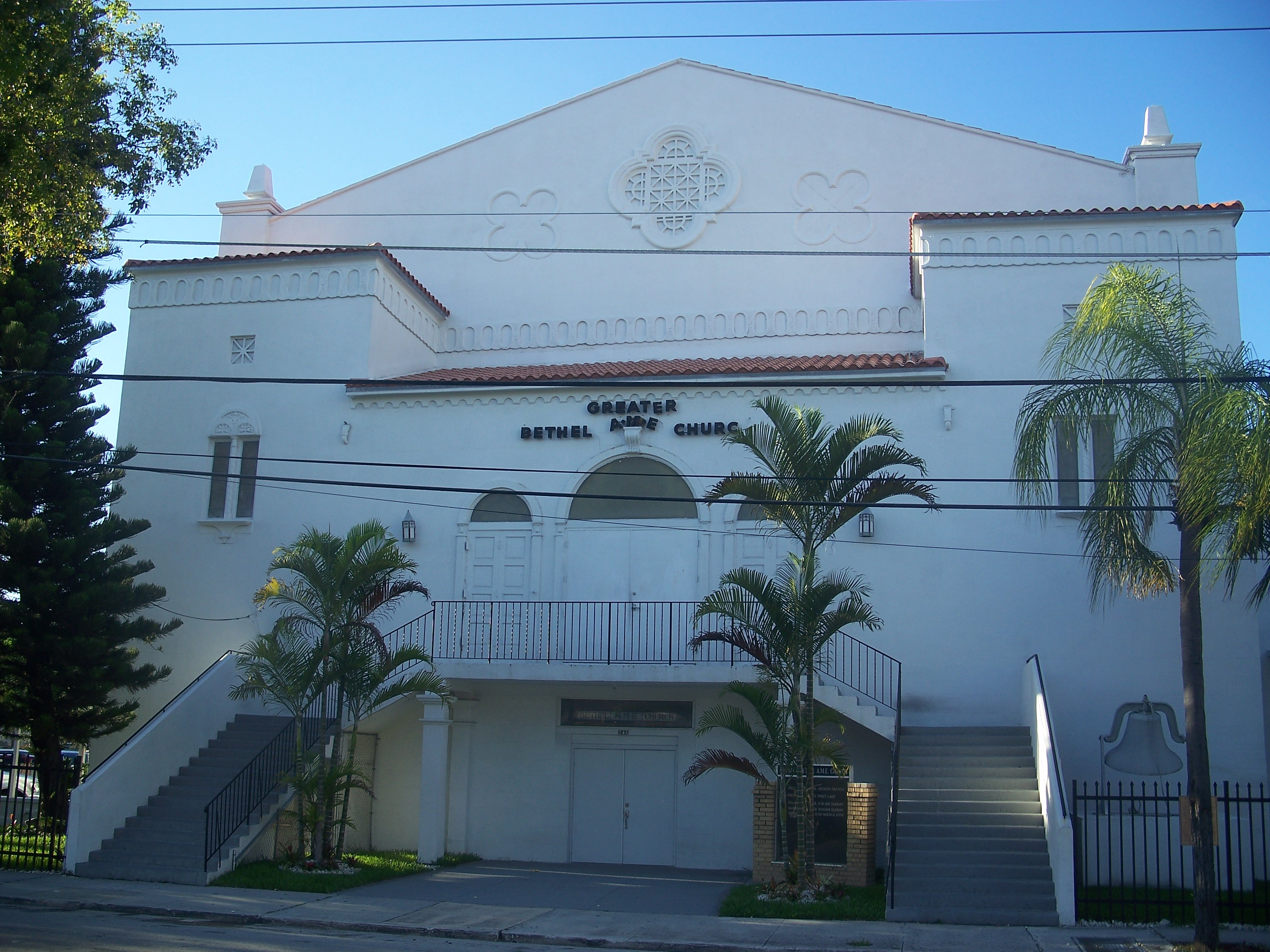

- Location within Miami Location within Florida Location within the United States
- Location: Miami, Florida
- Coordinates: 25°46′54″N 80°11′57″W
- MPS: Downtown Miami MRA
- NRHP reference No.: 88002987
- Added to NRHP: April 17, 1992

The Greater Bethel AME Church is a historic church in Miami, Florida. It is located at 245 Northwest 8th Street. On April 17, 1992, it was added to the U.S. National Register of Historic Places. The church was built in 1927. On February 12, 1958, Dr. Martin Luther King Jr. delivered a speech at the church, "Launching Of The SCLC Crusade For Citizenship."
