= Brickell Mausoleum =

Historic site in Miami, Florida

- U.S. National Register of Historic Places
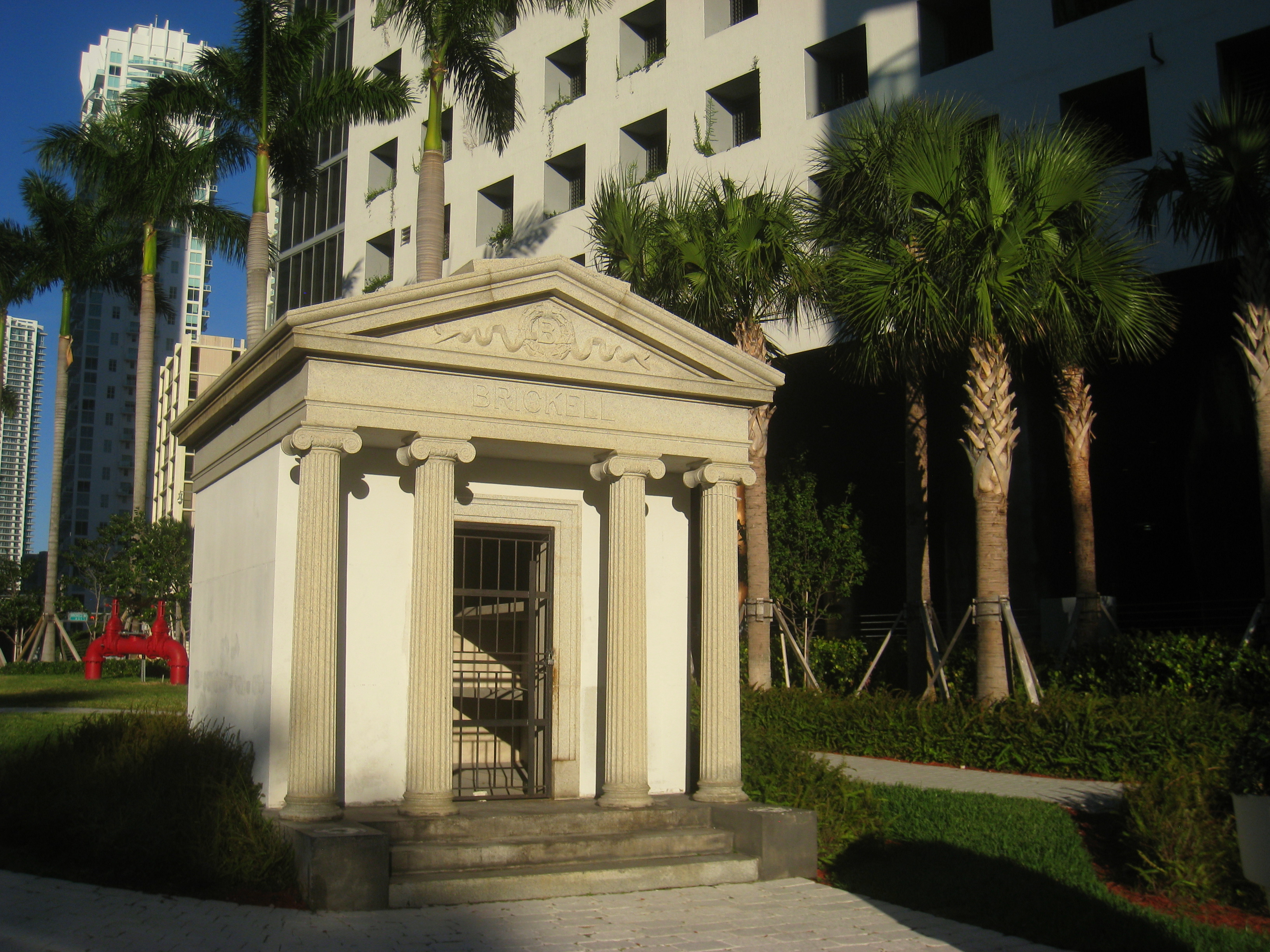

- Location within Miami Location within Florida Location within the United States
- Location: Miami, Florida
- Coordinates: 25°46′5.9232″N 80°11′23.1828″W
- MPS: Downtown Miami MRA
- NRHP reference No.: 88002977
- Added to NRHP: 4 January 1989

The Brickell Mausoleum is a historic mausoleum located in Miami, Florida at 501 Brickell Avenue. On January 4, 1989, it was added to the U.S. National Register of Historic Places.
