= I. and E. Greenwald Steam Engine No. 1058 =

- Formerly listed on the U.S. National Register of Historic Places
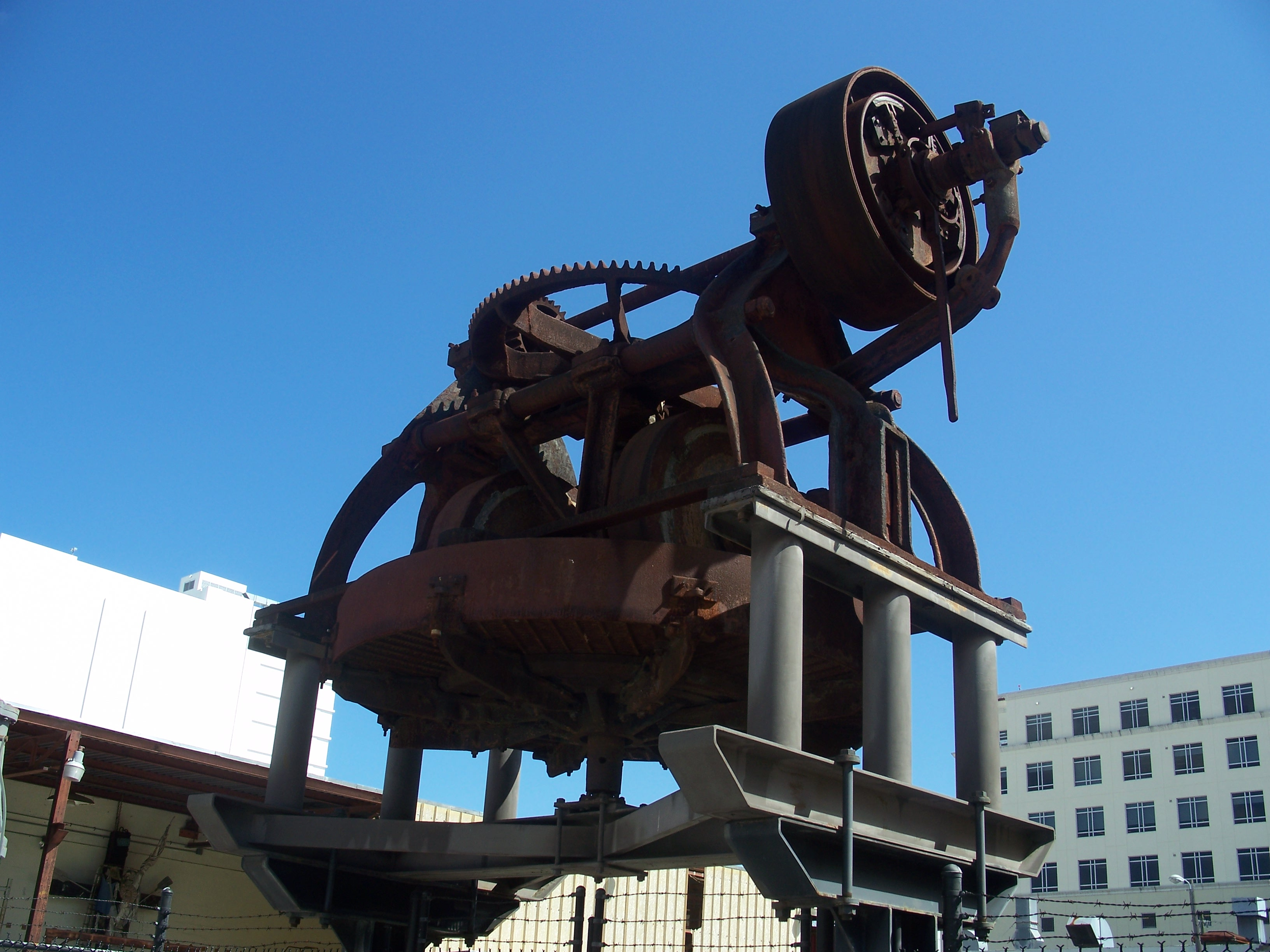
- Roller mill, once driven by the engine

- Location within Miami Location within Florida Location within the United States
- Location: 3898 Shipping Ave., Miami, Florida
- Coordinates: 25°43′58.8252″N 80°15′27.8748″W
- Built: 1906
- Architect: I. & E. Greenwald Co.
- Architectural style: Steam engine with rope-driven lineshaft
- NRHP reference No.: 87002197

Significant dates
- Added to NRHP: March 12, 1987
- Removed from NRHP: July 24, 2018

The I. and E. Greenwald Steam Engine No. 1058 is a historic stationary steam engine or mill engine in Miami, Florida. It is located at 3898 Shipping Avenue. It was notable for its use of a rope-drive pulley to lineshafts. It was added to the U.S. National Register of Historic Places in 1987, and removed in 2018.
