= D. A. Dorsey House =

Historic house in Florida, United States

- U.S. National Register of Historic Places
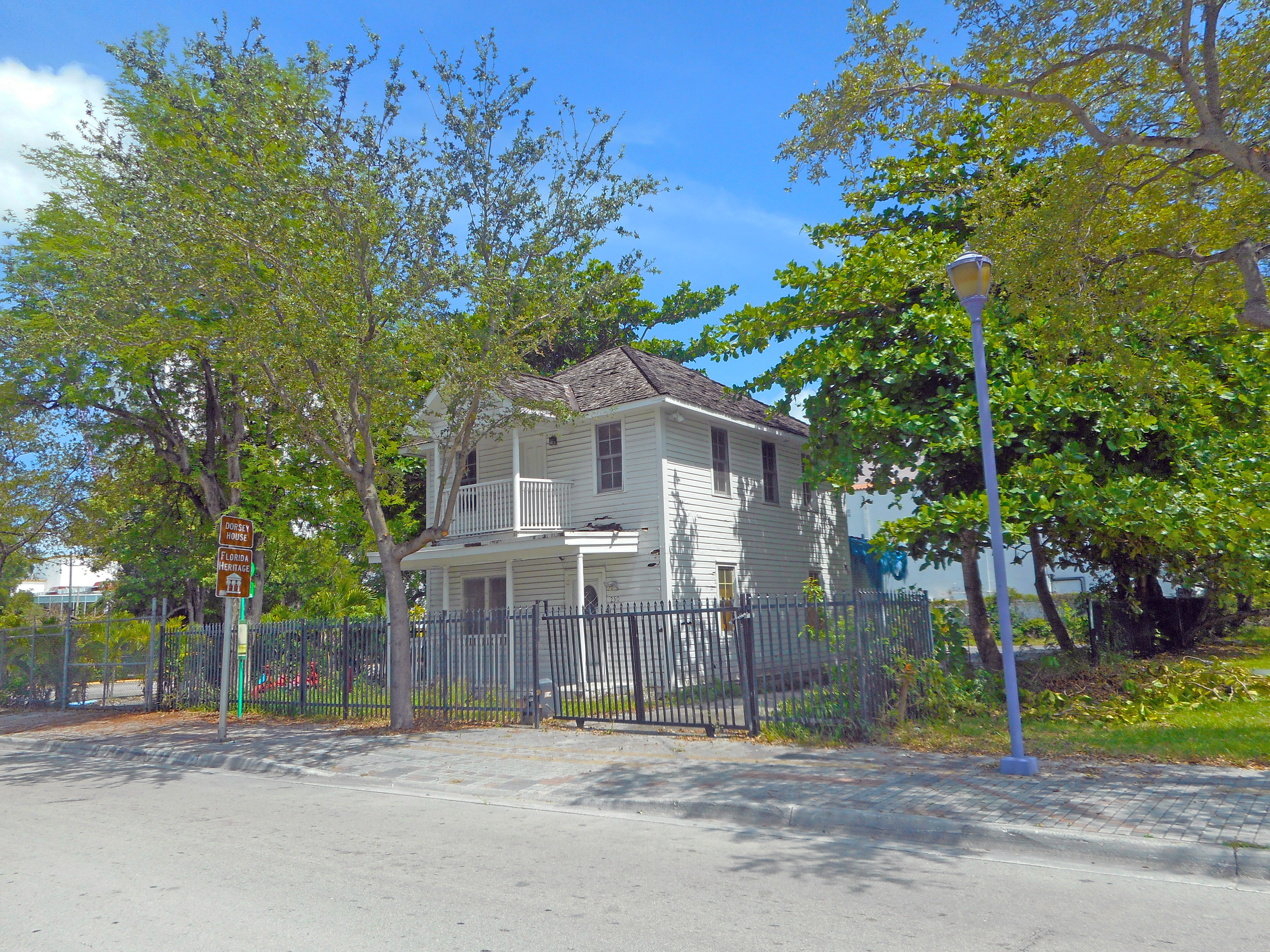

- Location within Miami Location within Florida Location within the United States
- Location: Miami, Florida
- Coordinates: 25°46′57″N 80°11′56″W
- MPS: Downtown Miami MRA
- NRHP reference No.: 88002966
- Added to NRHP: January 4, 1989

The D. A. Dorsey House is the historic home of D. A. Dorsey in Miami, Florida. It is located at 250 Northwest Ninth Street. On January 4, 1989, it was added to the U.S. National Register of Historic Places.
