= Sears, Roebuck and Company Department Store (Miami, Florida) =

- U.S. National Register of Historic Places
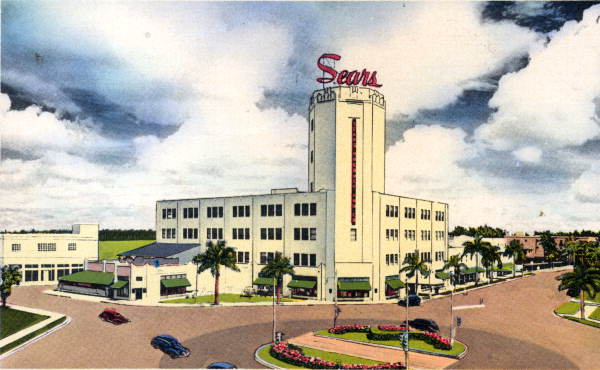
- Artist rendering of the Sears, Roebuck and Company Department Store in a postcard

- Location within Miami Location within Florida Location within the United States
- Location: 1300 Biscayne Blvd., Miami, Florida
- Coordinates: 25°47′14″N 80°11′24″W
- Area: 4.5 acres (1.8 ha)
- Built: 1929 Store Closed 1983
- Architect: Nimmons, Carr & Wright; Harrison Construction Co.
- Architectural style: Art Deco
- MPS: Downtown Miami MRA
- NRHP reference No.: 84003903
- Added to NRHP: August 8, 1997

The Sears, Roebuck and Company Department Store in Miami, Florida was an Art Deco building built in 1929 for Sears, Roebuck and Company. The building was the first known implementation of Art Deco architecture in the county and was spectacular. It was followed a year later by the Shrine Building (Miami, Florida), an application of Art Deco with local Seminole Indian motifs added as an interesting twist. Both were covered in a 1988 study of Downtown Miami historic resources, but were not NRHP-listed due to owner objections at the time. It was listed on the National Register of Historic Places on August 8, 1997. Only its tower remains.

After the area's drastic decline in the early 1980s, the building's intense structural decay, and declining sales, the store closed for good in 1983. The building remained vacant and abandoned and was the subject to graffiti and vandalism. Sears was unable to sell the property and it donated the site to Dade County in 1992. That same year, the Sears signs were removed.

The building listing was added to the National Register on August 8, 1997. By 2001, the only surviving part of the original structure was a seven-story tower. The original department store space had been demolished. The tower was preserved and incorporated it into the new Adrienne Arsht Center for the Performing Arts, built in 2006.

The Sears building at one point absorbed a former Burdines department store. The Art Deco building was constructed in 1929, predating the Art Deco hotels on Ocean Drive in Miami Beach.

== Gallery ==
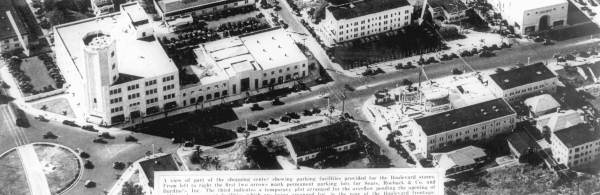
Aerial view in the 1920s

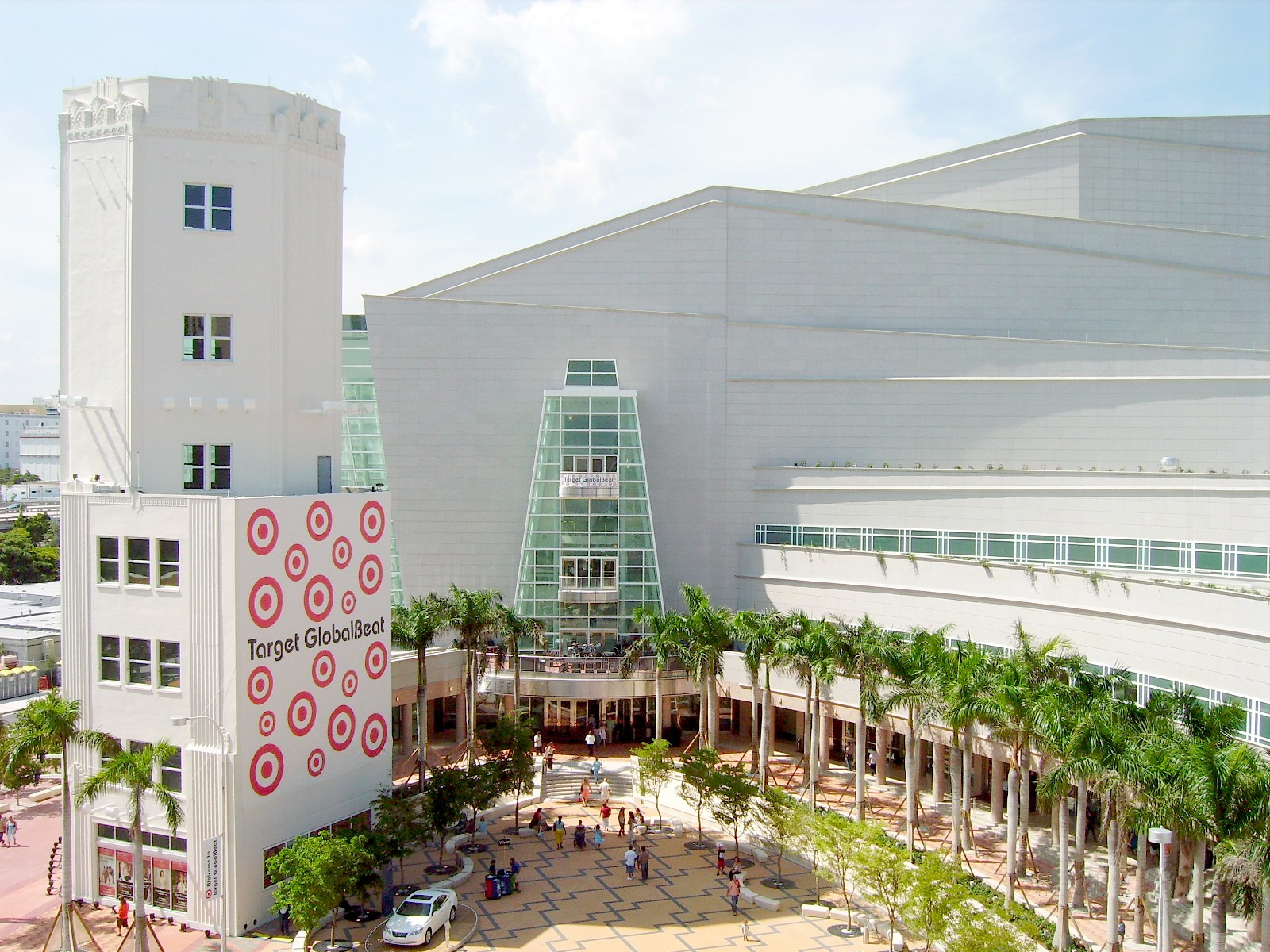
Just the tower survives

== See also ==
- Downtown Miami Multiple Resource Area
