= St. John's Baptist Church (Miami) =

Historic church in Florida, United States

- U.S. National Register of Historic Places
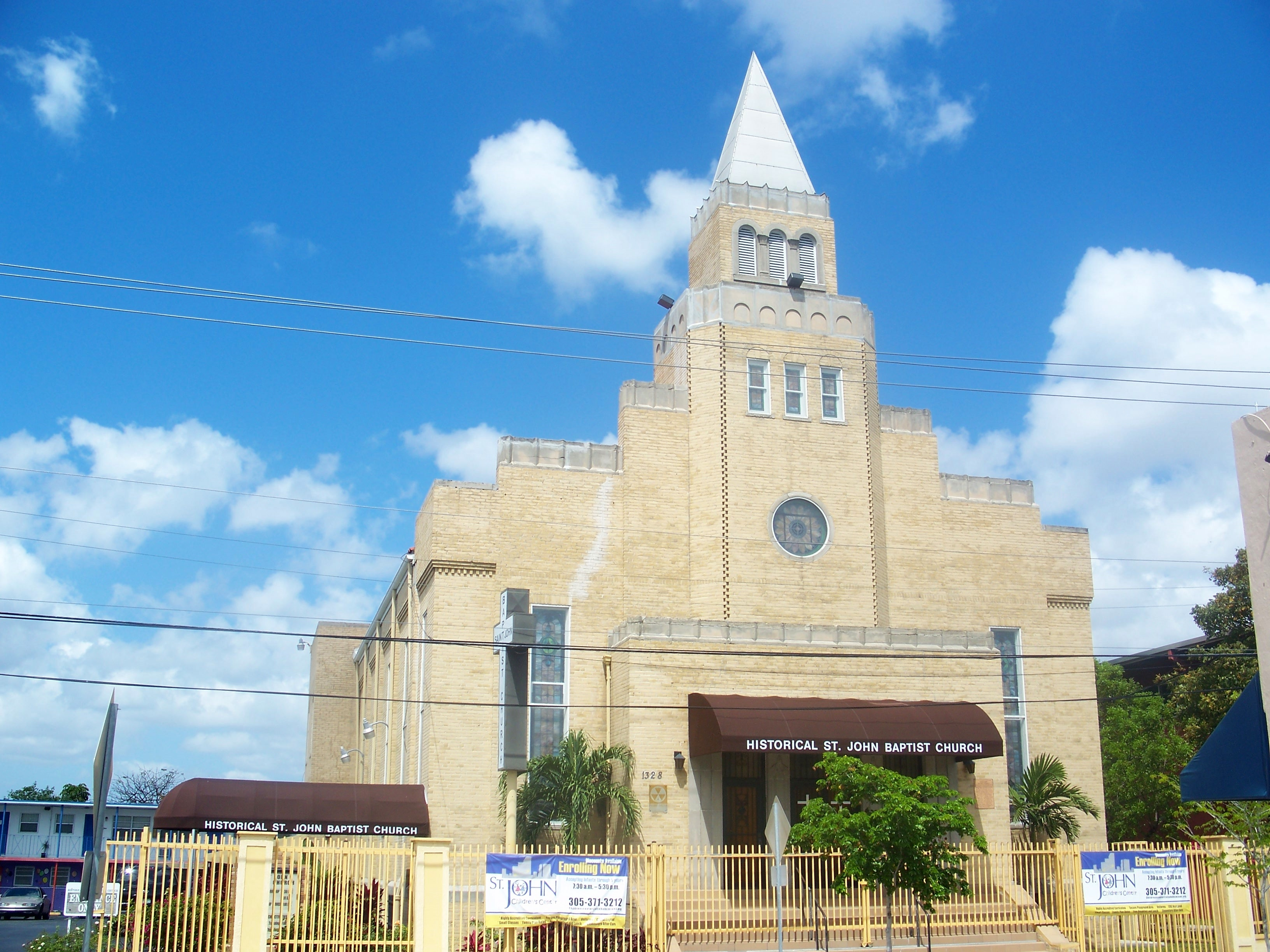

- Location within Miami Location within Florida Location within the United States
- Location: 1328 N.W. 3rd Ave., Miami, Florida
- Coordinates: 25°47′14.4528″N 80°11′59.9748″W
- Area: less than one acre
- Built: 1940
- Architect: McKissack & McKissack
- Architectural style: Moderne
- MPS: Downtown Miami Multiple Resource Area
- NRHP reference No.: 88002970
- Added to NRHP: April 17, 1992

St. John's Baptist Church (also known as the New St. John Institutional Baptist Church and St. John Institutional Missionary Baptist Church) is a historic church in Miami, Florida. It is located at 1328 Northwest 3rd Avenue. On April 17, 1992, it was added to the U.S. National Register of Historic Places.

On June 17, 1906 at the corner of NW 2nd Avenue and 11th Terrace, a small group was called together for worship.

They initially called this congregation Second Baptist Church. The first pastor of this group was Rev. Bynom.

After a short time, a second pastor, Rev. N.B. Williams, was called to lead this new and growing congregation. During Rev. Williams' tenure, the membership moved to Jackson's Hall on 10th street between 2nd and 3rd Avenue. The members considered plans for a permanent location. After purchasing a lot at 12th Street and 3rd Avenue, construction began on a 50X48 foot frame building.

The congregation moved into this building on the third Sunday in February 1908. Rev. Williams served until the latter part of 1910.

In 1912, Rev. Jarius Wilkerson Drake cast his membership with the church. He assumed leadership of the church on the first Sunday in February. Rev. Drake maintained a loving and Christian attitude towards all members. The membership grew and increased tremendously. The initial church building was damaged and wrecked during storms in 1926 and 1928, but was remodeled. This building became too small under Rev. Drake's leadership, and the congregation purchased a larger site to accommodate the membership. The newly built church, completed in 1940, is located on the current site, which sits on 13th Street and 3rd Avenue. The church then became known as St. John Missionary Baptist Church. Rev. Drake served as pastor until his death in February 1951.

Succeeding Rev. Drake was Rev. Thedford Johnson, who was serving as Assistant Pastor. Under his pastorate, a two-story building at 1148 NW 3rd Avenue was built as a parsonage; the Fellowship Hall was built, the Children's Center (formerly known as the Tot Center) was established, an apartment unit was purchased, the sanctuary was air-conditioned, the pews were cushioned and a two-mirror loft in the main sanctuary was built. St. John also experienced national recognition with their Baptist Training Union (BTU). For three decades, St. John was noted as not only the largest and best in the Florida East Coast and the State, but was acclaimed as the "National Model" by then National President Dr. J. H. Jackson. Because of Rev. Johnson's interest in civic and political affairs, and his motivation of the congregation toward civic pride, the church continued to thrive. St. John hosted the National Baptist Convention four times: 1969, 1973, 1977 and 1982. Rev. Johnson also maintained a radio program from 1977 through 1980. The church revised its name to reflect the current standing, St. John Institutional Missionary Baptist Church. Rev. Johnson resigned in February 1985.

Rev. Henry Nevin became Interim Pastor in March 1985 and Senior Pastor in 1986. Rev. Nevin introduced the idea of having a Community Development Corporation to assist in rehabilitating subsidized housing for the poor and building median income housing for the community. Rev. Nevin retired from his pastoral services on Sunday, June 1, 2008.

In April 2010, Bishop James Dean Adams became Senior Pastor of St. John and served until December 2021.

The building was designed by architects McKissack & McKissack in Moderne style. It has also been known as New St. John Institutional Baptist Church.
