= Walgreen Drug Store (Miami, Florida) =

- U.S. National Register of Historic Places
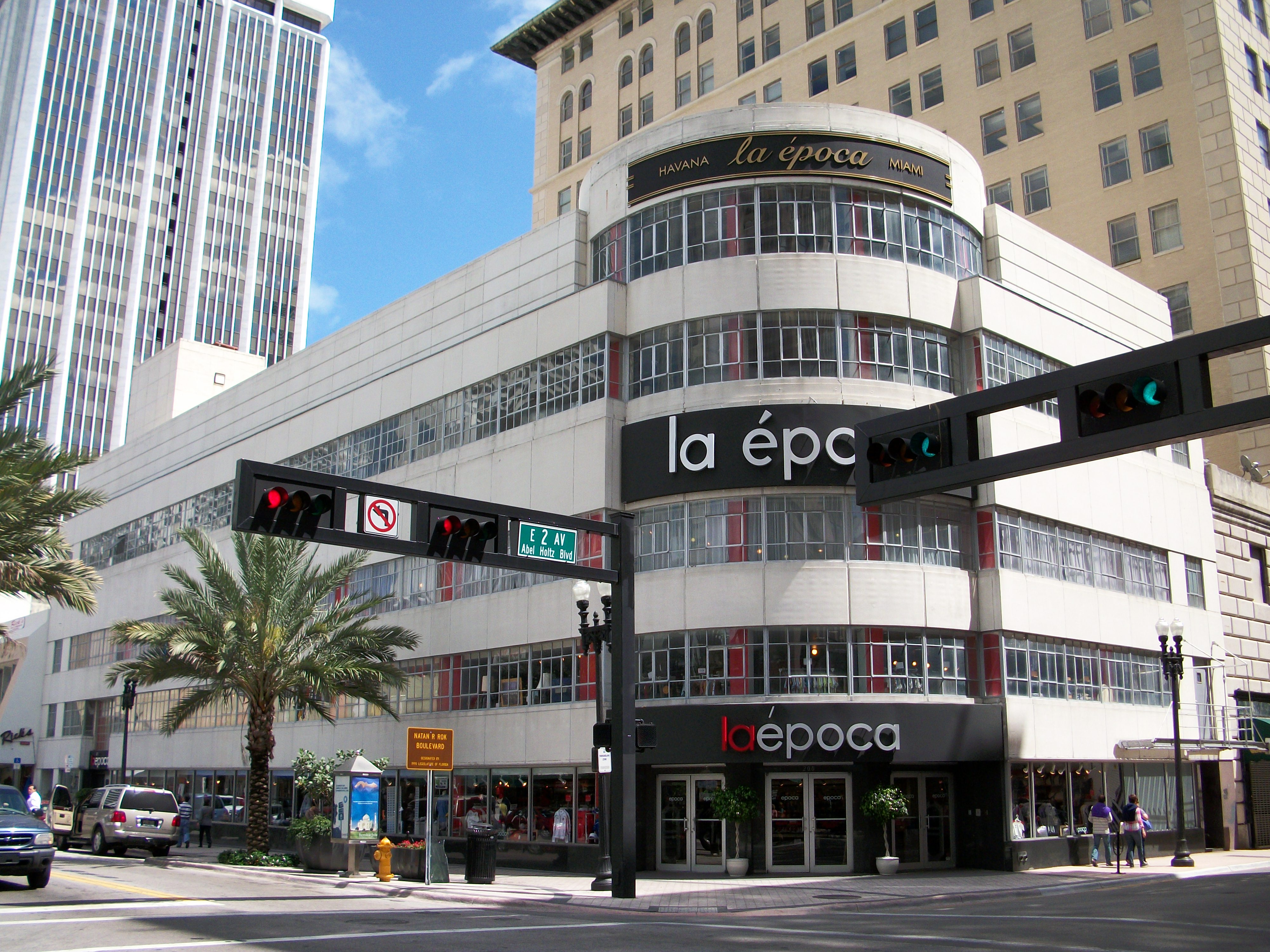

- Location within Miami Location within Florida Location within the United States
- Location: 200 E. Flagler St., Miami, Florida
- Coordinates: 25°46′26.925″N 80°11′25″W
- Area: less than one acre
- Built: 1936
- Architect: Zimmerman, Saxe & MacBride; E. A. Ehmann
- Architectural style: Streamline Moderne
- MPS: Downtown Miami MRA
- NRHP reference No.: 88002982
- Added to NRHP: January 4, 1989

The Walgreen Drug Store (aka Walgreens) is a historic site in Miami, Florida. It is found at 200 East Flagler Street.

Constructed in 1936, the Streamline Moderne structure was designed by Zimmerman, Saxe, and MacBride Architects with E. A. Ehmann as Associates Architect.

On November 17, 1988, the building was added to the Miami Register of Historic Places and subsequently, on January 4, 1989, it was listed on the U.S. National Register of Historic Places on January 4, 1989.

After Walgreens moved out, La Epoca department store occupied the space from 2005 to 2016.

In June 2023, the building's third tenant, Julia & Henry's, opened as a food hall. Named in honor of Julia Tuttle and Henry Flagler, the establishment provides dining experiences from many chefs and over 30 restaurants, shops, bars and unique local eateries.
