= Palm Cottage (Miami, Florida) =

Historic house in Florida, United States

- U.S. National Register of Historic Places
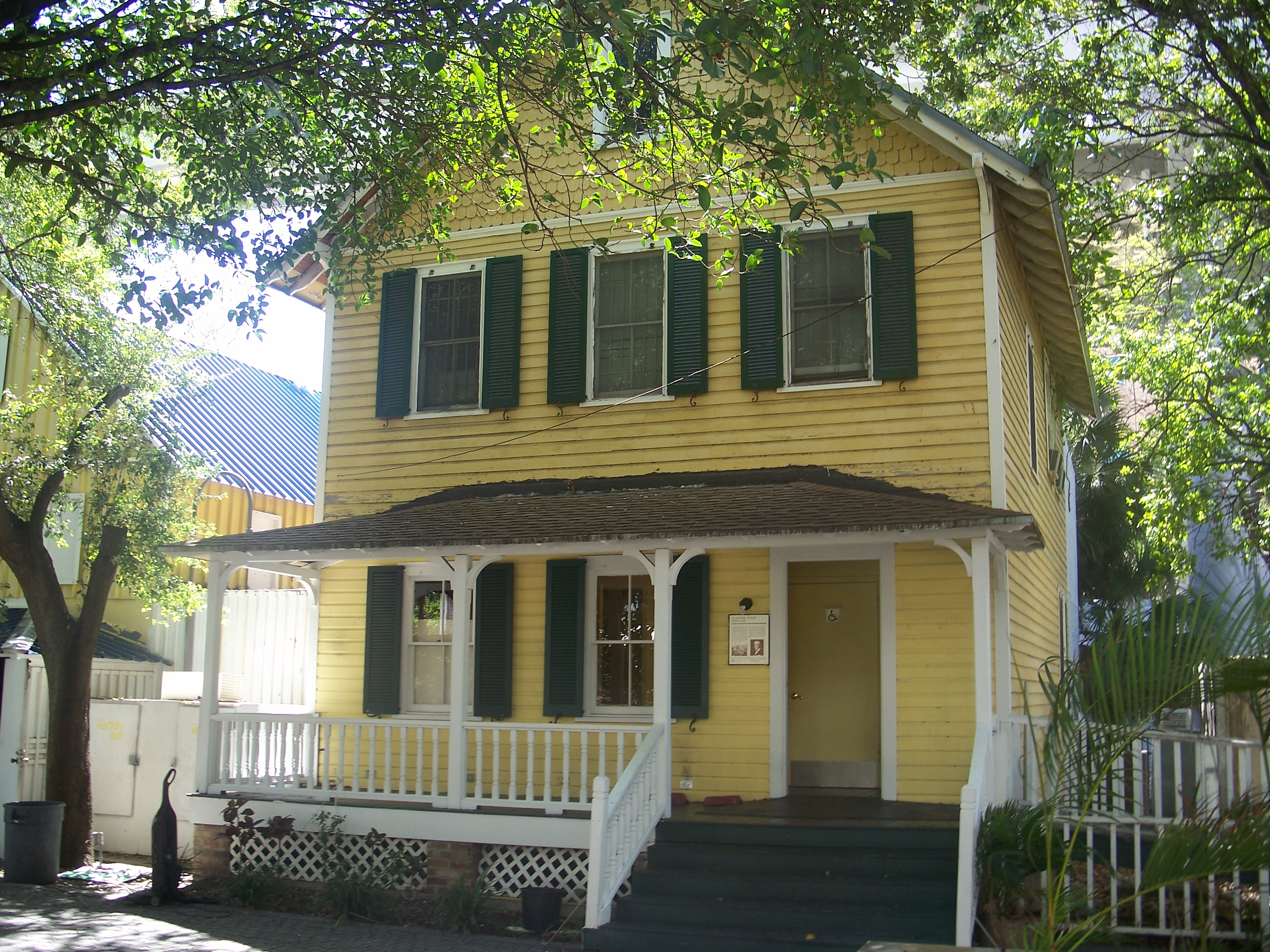

- Location within Miami Location within Florida Location within the United States
- Location: Miami, Florida
- Coordinates: 25°46′14″N 80°11′33″W
- MPS: Downtown Miami MRA
- NRHP reference No.: 88002957
- Added to NRHP: January 4, 1989

The Palm Cottage (also known as Flagler Worker's House) is a historic home in Miami, Florida. It is the last known building in Miami directly associated with railroad magnate and developer Henry M. Flagler. It is also one of the city's few surviving examples of Folk Victorian architecture. Built around 1897, this house was one of at least 30 rental houses that Flagler constructed as homes for the workers building his Royal Palm Hotel. The building was moved to Fort Dallas Park in 1980, located at 60 Southeast 4th Street. On January 4, 1989, it was added to the U.S. National Register of Historic Places.
