= Kentucky Home =

Historic house in Florida, United States

- U.S. National Register of Historic Places
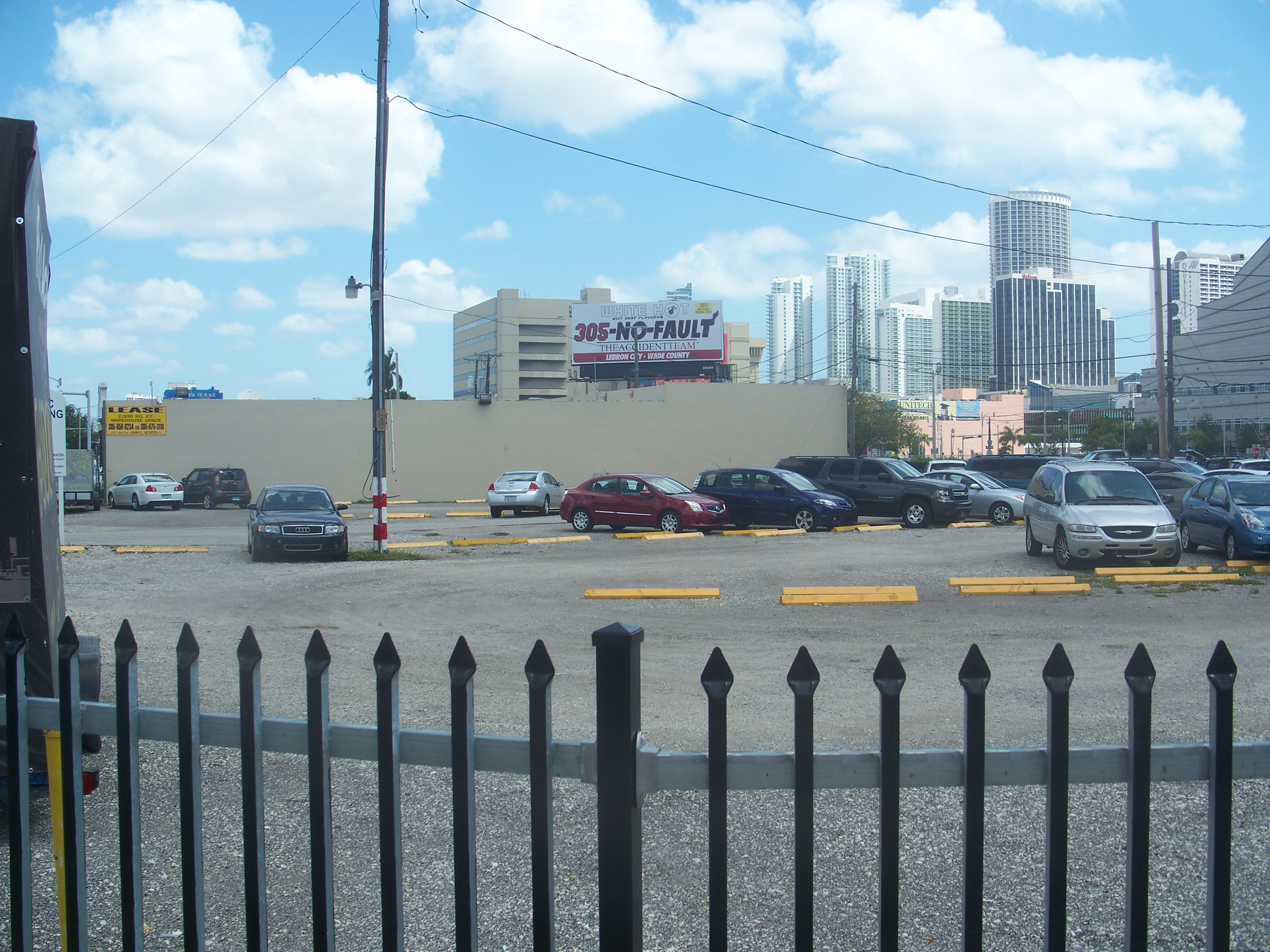

- Location within Miami Location within Florida Location within the United States
- Location: Miami, Florida
- Coordinates: 25°47′10″N 80°11′31″W
- MPS: Downtown Miami MRA
- NRHP reference No.: 88002969
- Added to NRHP: January 4, 1989

The Kentucky Home (also known as the Anderson Hotel) was a historic home in Miami, Florida. It was located at 1221 and 1227 Northeast 1st Avenue. On January 4, 1989, it was added to the U.S. National Register of Historic Places, but afterwards it was demolished.
