= Alfred I. DuPont Building =

- U.S. National Register of Historic Places
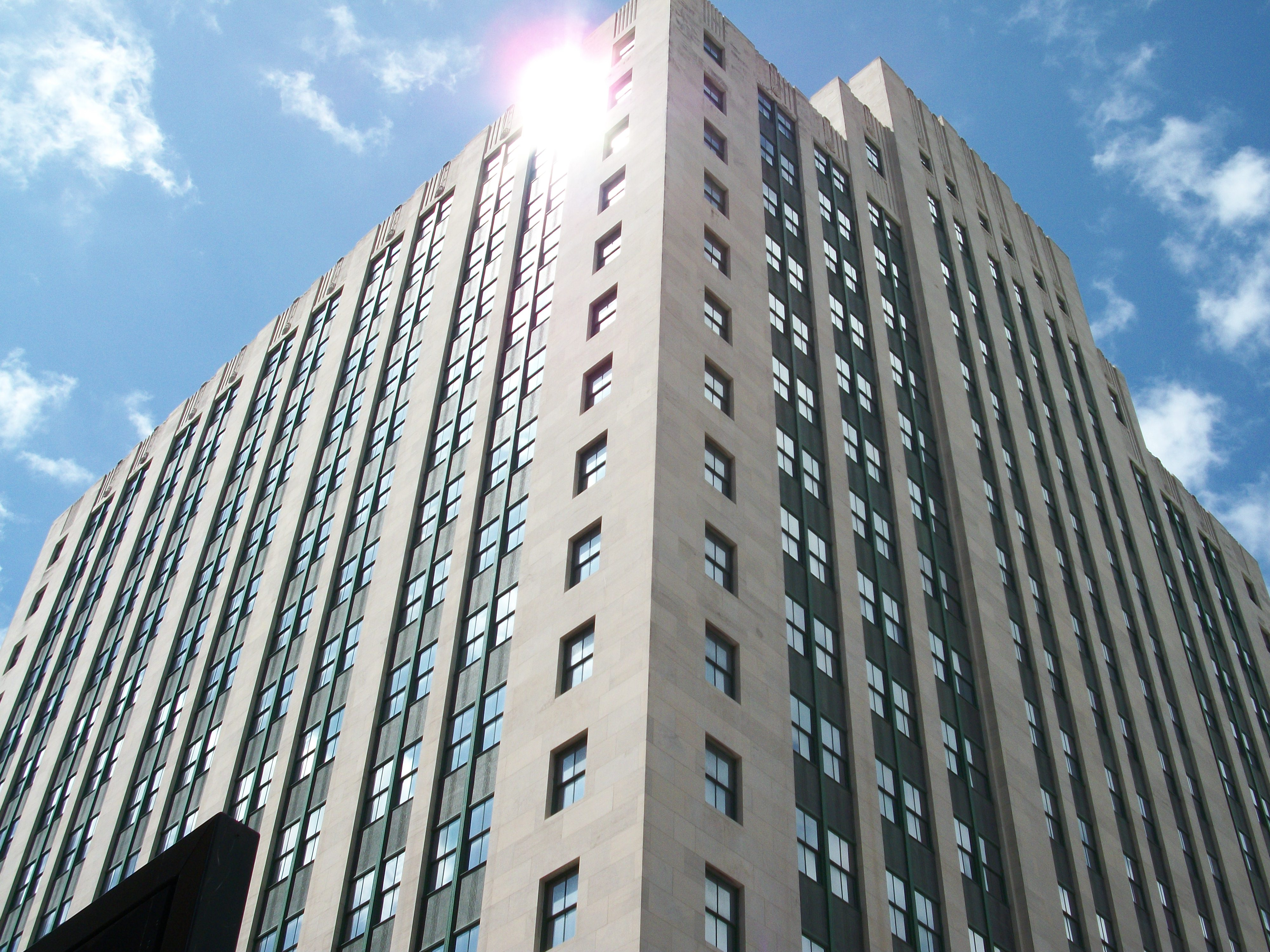

- Location within Miami Location within Florida Location within the United States
- Location: Miami, Florida
- Coordinates: 25.7745°N 80.1906°W
- Built: 1939
- Architect: Marsh and Saxelbye
- Architectural style: Modern
- MPS: Downtown Miami MRA
- NRHP reference No.: 88002984
- Added to NRHP: January 4, 1989

The Alfred I. DuPont Building is a historic building in Miami, Florida. It is located at 169 East Flagler Street. Started in 1937 and completed in 1939, it is a 17-story rectangular building in the Modern style with Art Deco embellishments. It was the first skyscraper built after the County courthouse and the bust of 1928. Thus it represents Miami's emergence from the great depression. It replaced the Halcyon Hotel on this site. On January 4, 1989, it was added to the U.S. National Register of Historic Places.

Alfred I. DuPont was the owner of the Florida National Bank, the principal tenant of the building. Major tenants in 2023 are Bench jewelers who use a combination of skills to make and repair jewelry. Some of the more common skills that a bench jeweler might employ include antique restoration, silversmithing, goldsmithing, stone setting, engraving, fabrication, wax carving, lost-wax casting, electroplating, forging, & polishing. manufactures & wholesale watches for Rolex & Richard Mille. The other major building in Miami is the Seybold Building for jewelry, diamonds and fine watches.
