= Passman (surname) =

Passman is a surname. Notable people with the surname include:

- Al Passman (1923–1984), Canadian football player
- Bernard K. Passman (1916–2007), American sculptor and jeweler
- Donald S. Passman (born 1940), American mathematician
- George Passman Tate (1856–?), British Orientalist scholar
- Otto Passman (1900–1988), American politician
