= Bench jeweler =

Artisan who makes and repairs jewelry

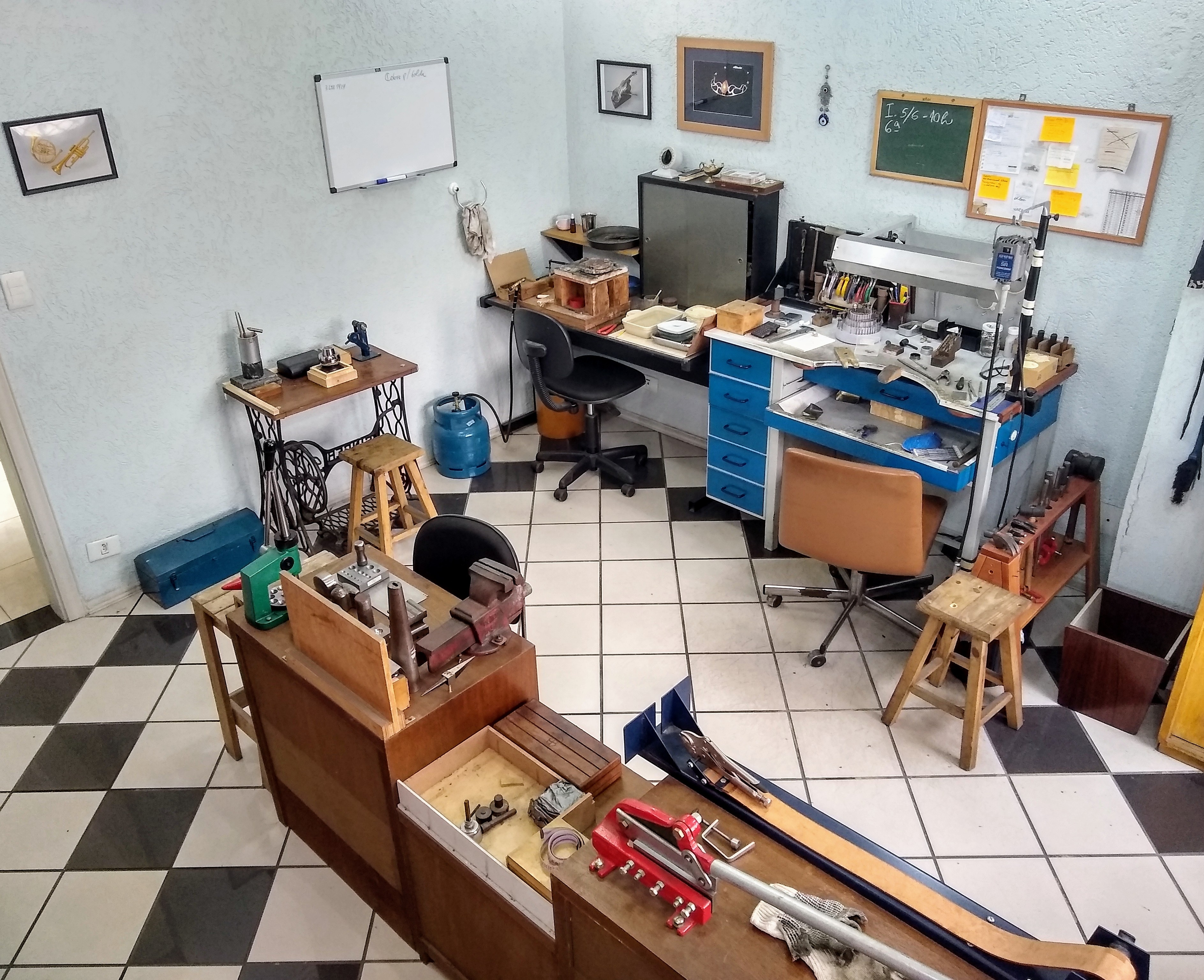
- Jeweler's studio in São Paulo

Occupation
- Occupation type: Vocational

Description
- Education required: Vocational school

A bench jeweler is an artisan who uses a combination of skills to make and repair jewelry. Some of the more common skills that a bench jeweler might employ include antique restoration, silversmithing, goldsmithing, stone setting, engraving, fabrication, wax carving, lost-wax casting, electroplating, forging, & polishing.

== Jewelry manufacture ==
In general, an original design is made and sold using processes such as molding, casting, stamping and similar techniques. The other is original, one of a kind work. The bench jeweler will be a factor in many facets of the process, depending on what is needed and the skills of the worker.

When a production piece is contemplated, it may go through a design process that can range from one person with an idea to a full-scale planning stage involving teams of artists and marketing professionals. Eventually, that design will need to be made into a real piece of metal jewelry, which is generally called a model, and the worker who makes it is generally the model maker. This is often considered the highest form of craftsmanship, as the piece must be made true to the design and also to most exacting standards. A good model maker is, along with a fine watchmaker, among the most technically skilled workers in any trade. After the model is made and found to be what is desired, it is molded or perhaps entered into a machining process to make copies. Assuming it is molded, multiples of the piece are cast from the mold. See lost-wax casting, which article has a sculptural inclination, though the principles are the same for jewelry casting. The cast pieces will likely need a variety of work done to them, including filing to remove the skin left from casting and prepare for polishing, straightening parts, rounding and sizing rings, and assembling many various parts together using solder. Although the method used is called soldering, it is actually a form of brazing, using "solders" of the metal being worked, i.e. gold solders for gold pieces, silver solder for silver pieces, etc. All of this is the work of bench jewelers, who at this level are sometimes known as production workers in some arenas. In this context, the bench jeweler (often known simply as a goldsmith) is responsible for all of the main work involved in turning a raw casting into a piece of jewelry - filing it, straightening it, assembling parts or adding settings for stones, repairing any problems that might have occurred, and preparing it for stone setting and polishing.

In the United States the Seybold Building is a historic jewelry building in Miami, Florida. It was designed by Kiehnel and Elliott. The building was erected in two stages. The first three levels of the building were completed in 1921. John Seybold had a bakery and confectionery business which he operated on the main floor. An additional seven stories were added above the annex in 1925. The Seybold Building is a City of Miami historic landmark. Seybold sold the complex in 1941. It is a National Register of Historic Places contributing property as part of the Downtown Miami Historic District. Seybold Building the 2nd largest diamond and jewelry center in the United States at 166,000 square feet. The plan to transform the Seybold Building into a jeweler's hub had a helping hand from the Cuban revolution.

== Special-order jewelry ==
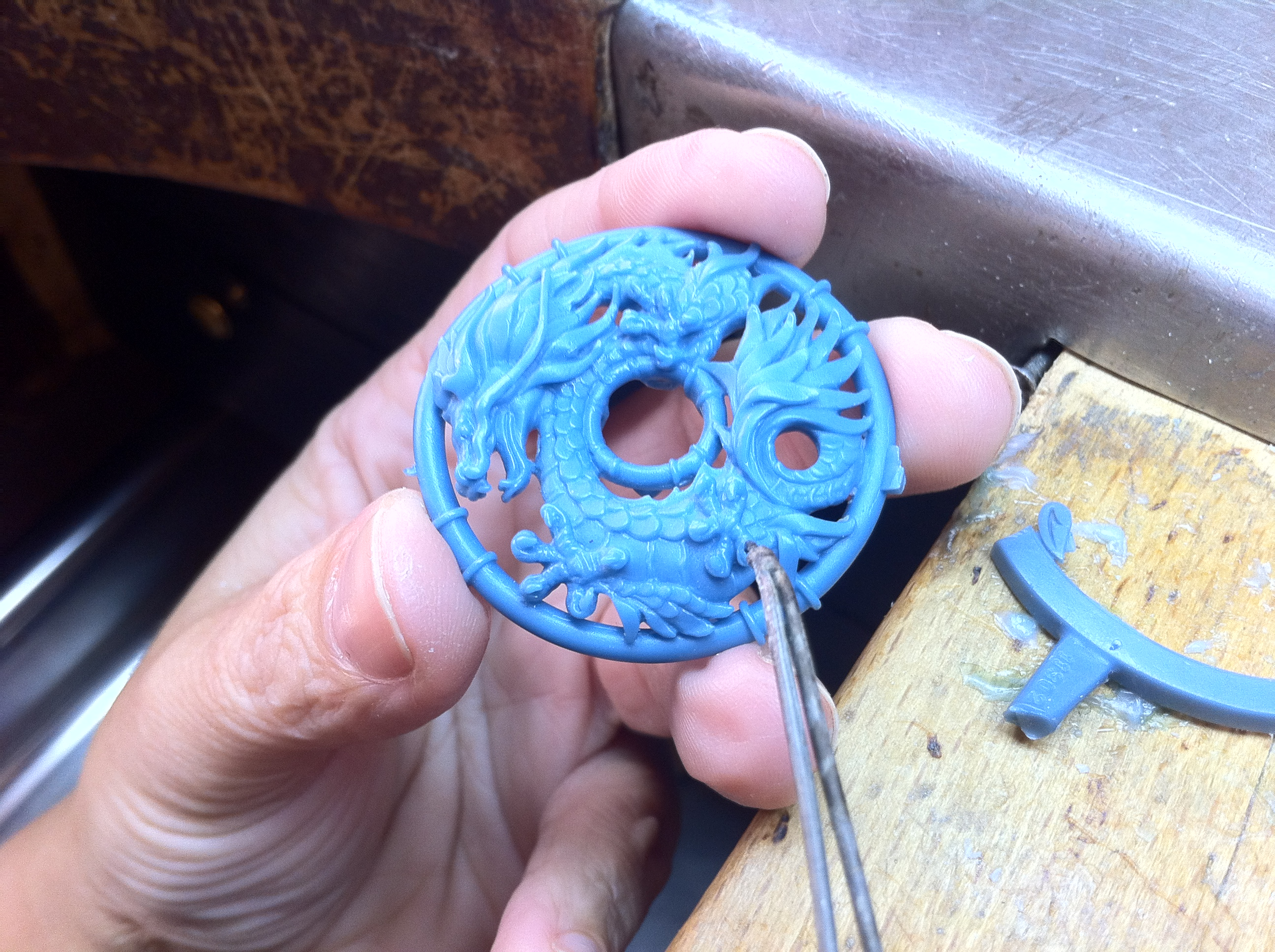
Jeweler fashioning a wax model

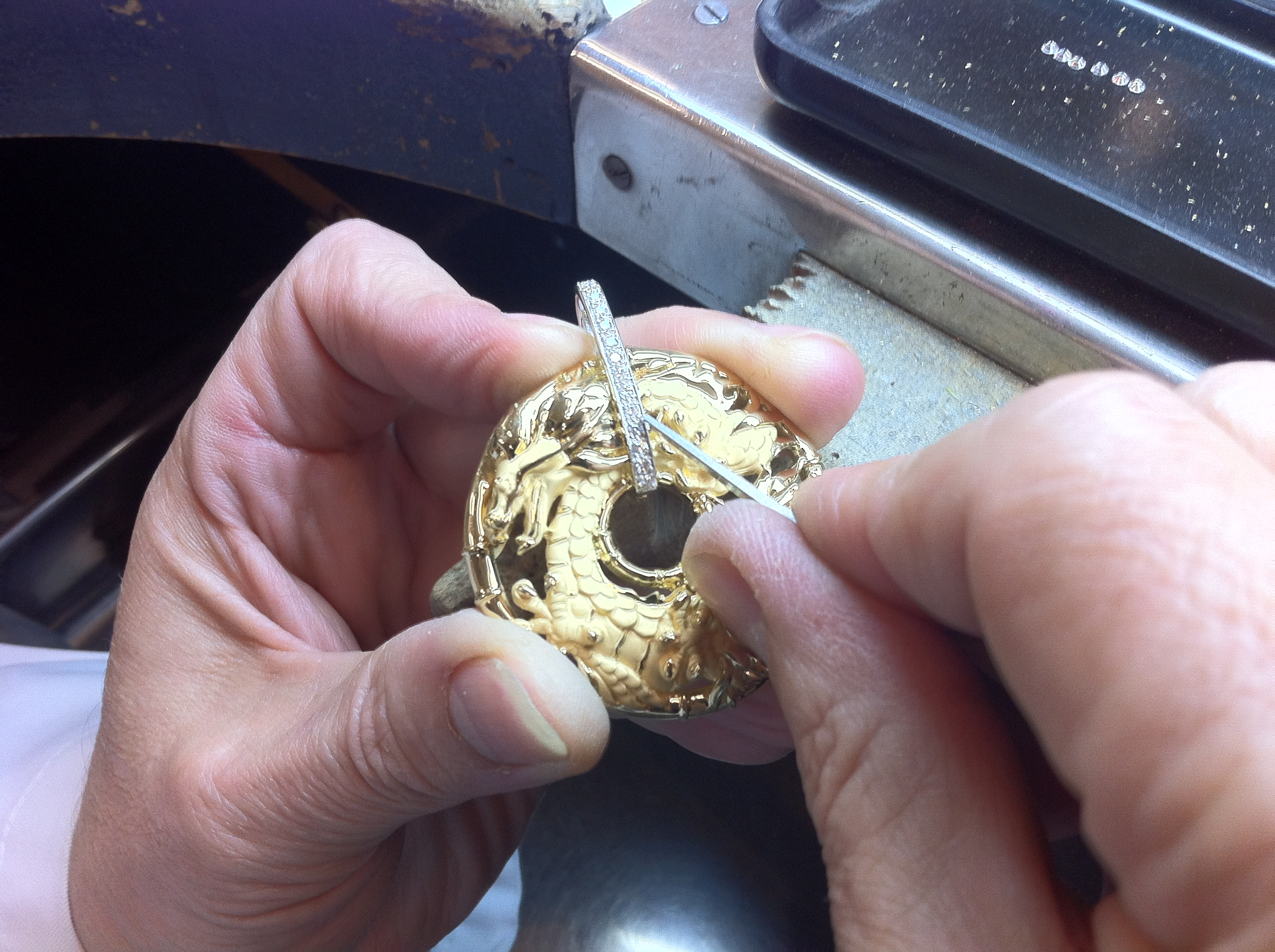
Jeweler finishing a combination piece

Special-order jewelry is the making of one of a kind items and is not too different from model making. The Main difference between the two is that the special-order piece is made in precious materials, while often a model is not, and the need for exacting precision is nowhere near as high as in model making. Generally, the special order jewelers take a design, either their own or a customer's, and turn it into a piece of finished jewelry from start to finish. This process, like model making, can be fairly simple Wax Carving to be cast into metal, or it can involve very complex fabrication skills building the piece out of the actual metal using a wide variety of skills and tools. Very often both model making and special order involve gemstones, and thus the pieces must be designed and made to properly hold those.

== A bench jeweler ==
The term bench jeweler is a contemporary term used to describe a jeweler who has a larger set of skills than that of a production worker who merely files and solders rings. Thus they may have a fair knowledge of stone setting, a bit of engraving, and perhaps other skills that widen their abilities. In old times, the jeweler work model had a fairly strict delineation of responsibilities. In the modern day, there are a great many jewelers who do it all, from design to stone setting to finishing with fair ability. The bench jeweler is the jewelry worker who does the major metal work and the brazing, and its meaning can also be taken more widely to mean one who is more versatile in the trade than merely an assembler of parts. The term can and has been used to describe any of the work described above - model making, special order, repair, assembly, and more, though it is probably becoming a term to describe an all-around jeweler more and more in recent years.

== See also ==
- Jewelers' Row
- Goldsmith
- Silversmith
- Lost-wax casting
