= Downtown Miami Historic District =

Historic district in Florida, United States

- U.S. National Register of Historic Places
- U.S. Historic district
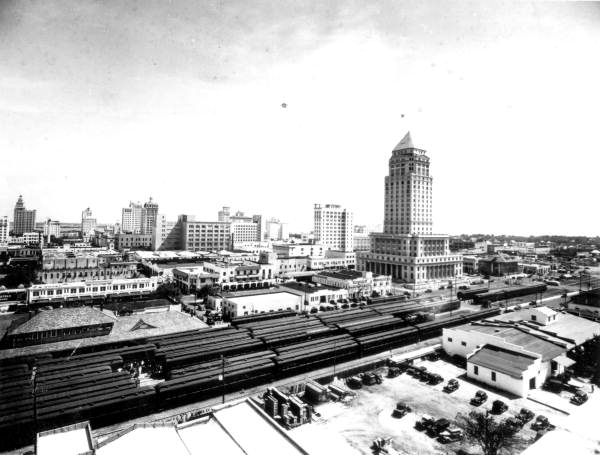
- Downtown Miami skyline in the early 1930s

- Location within Miami Location within Florida Location within the United States
- Location: Downtown, Miami, Florida
- Coordinates: 25°46′28.8546″N 80°11′30.8652″W
- Architectural style: Moderne, Classical Revival, Art Deco, Mediterranean Revival
- MPS: Downtown Miami MRA
- NRHP reference No.: 05001356
- Added to NRHP: December 6, 2005

The Downtown Miami Historic District is a U.S. historic district (designated as such on December 6, 2005) located in the Central Business District of Downtown Miami, Florida.

The district is bounded by Miami Court, North Third Street, West Third Avenue, and South Second Street. It contains 60 historic buildings. A large portion the buildings in the historic district were built during the Florida land boom of the 1920s, when Miami experienced rapid population growth. Many of the older structures from before the 1920s, were smaller scale buildings and homes from the Miami pioneer era of the mid and late-19th century. Palm Cottage, built in 1897 is a home from the pioneer era that is still standing, however, few of these original homes remain.

== Gallery ==
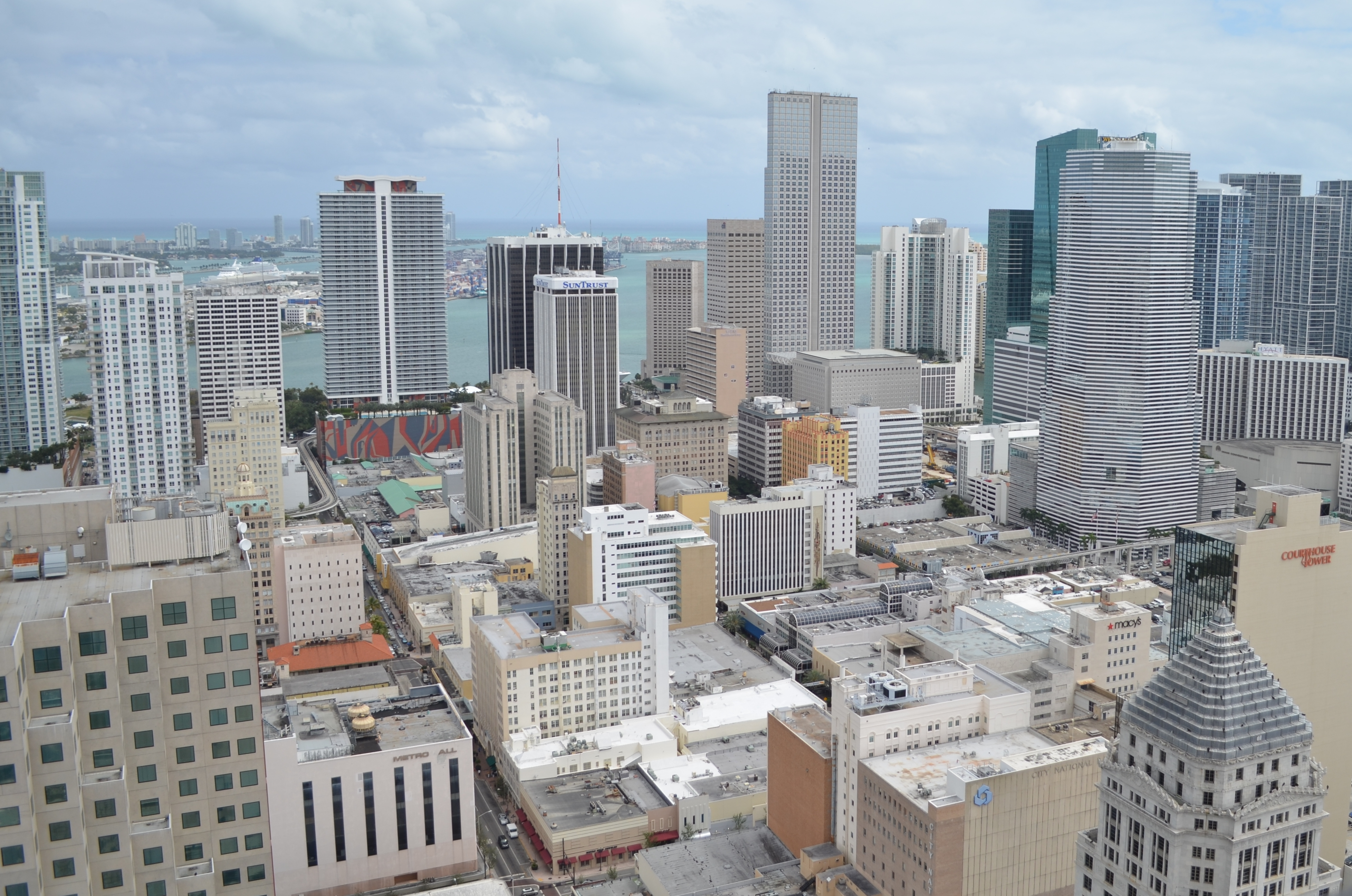
Much of the CBD consists of low and mid-rise historic buildings.

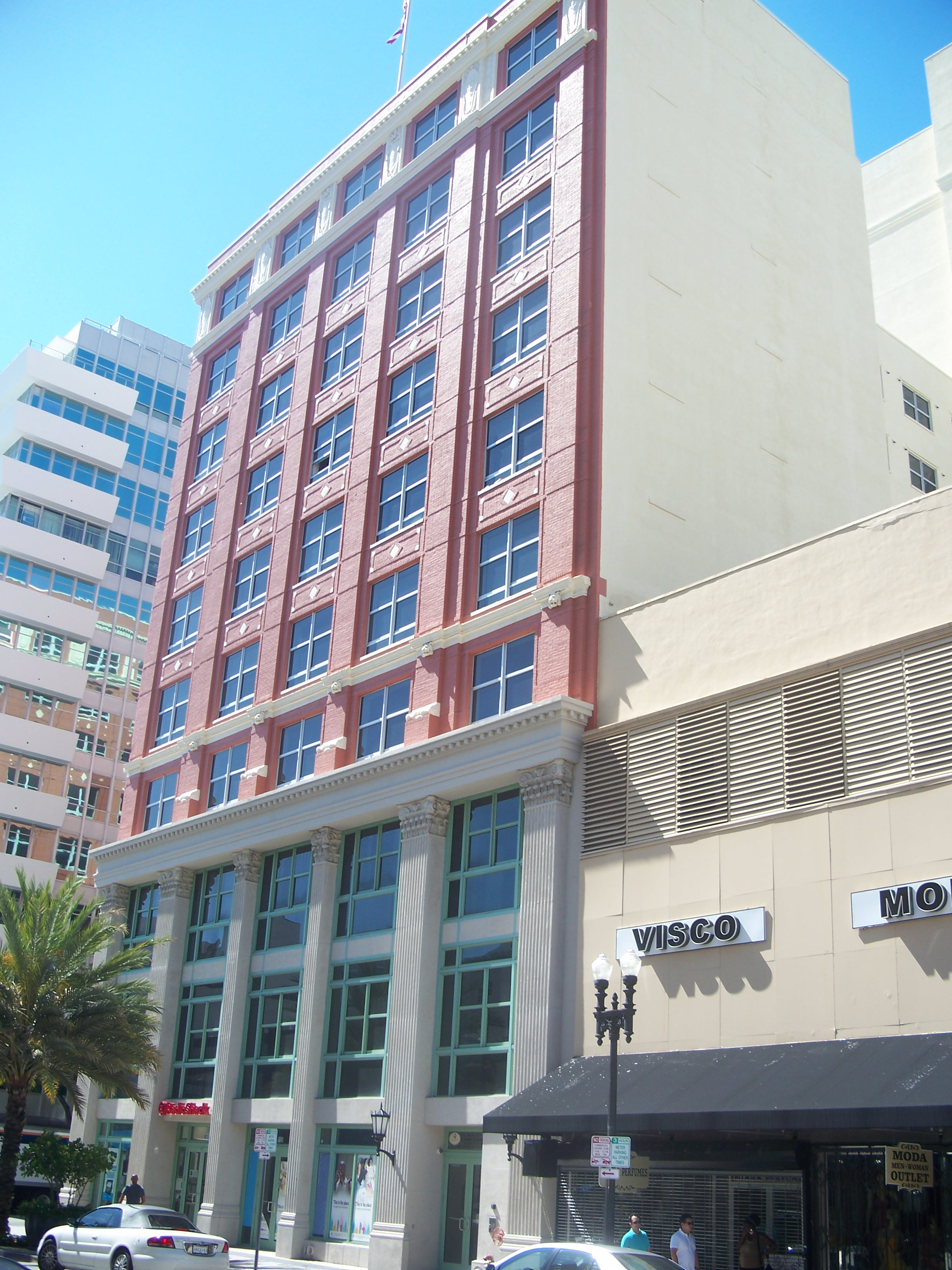
101 East Flagler Street, 1923

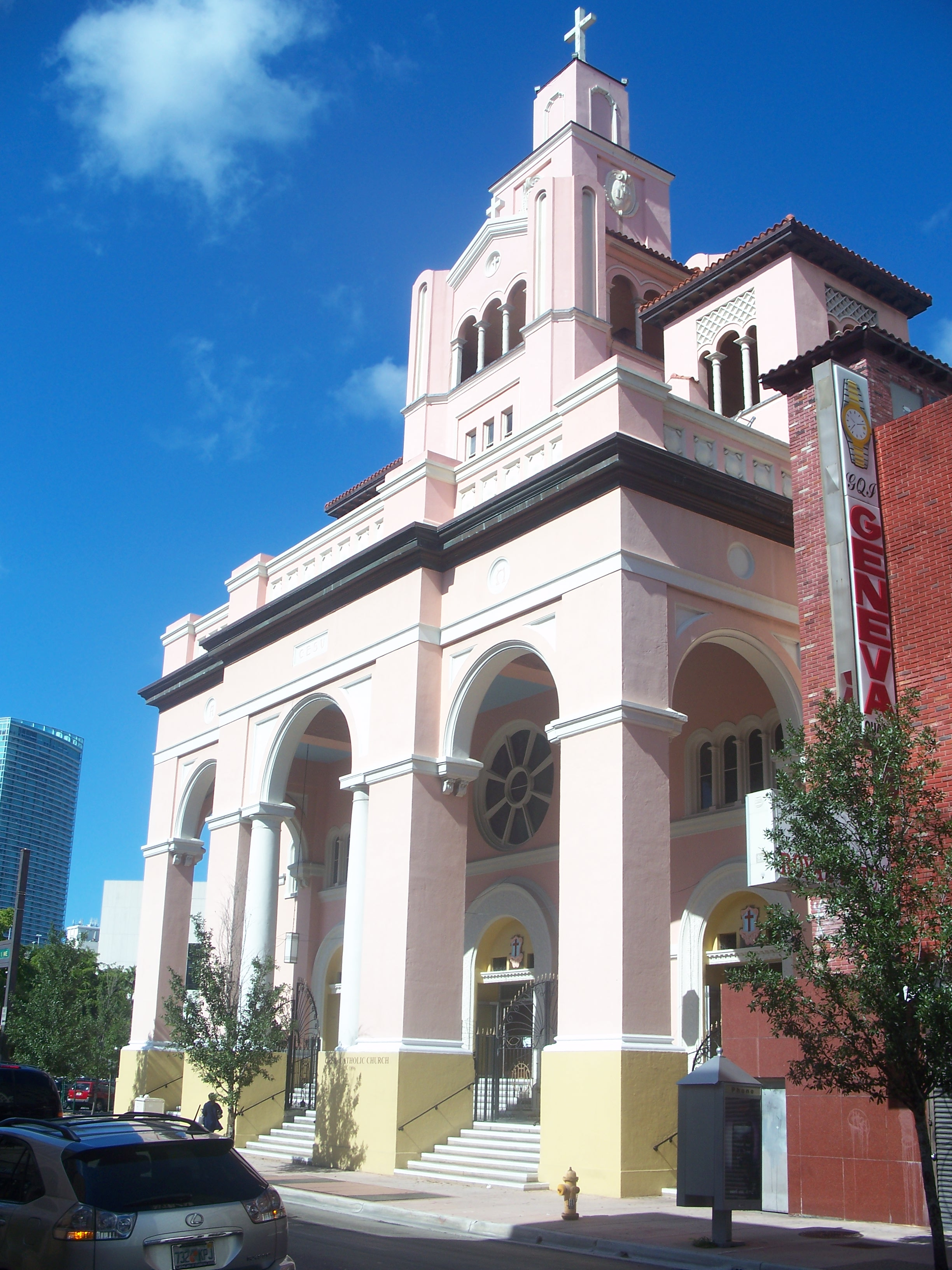
Gesu Church, oldest Catholic church in Miami, 1925

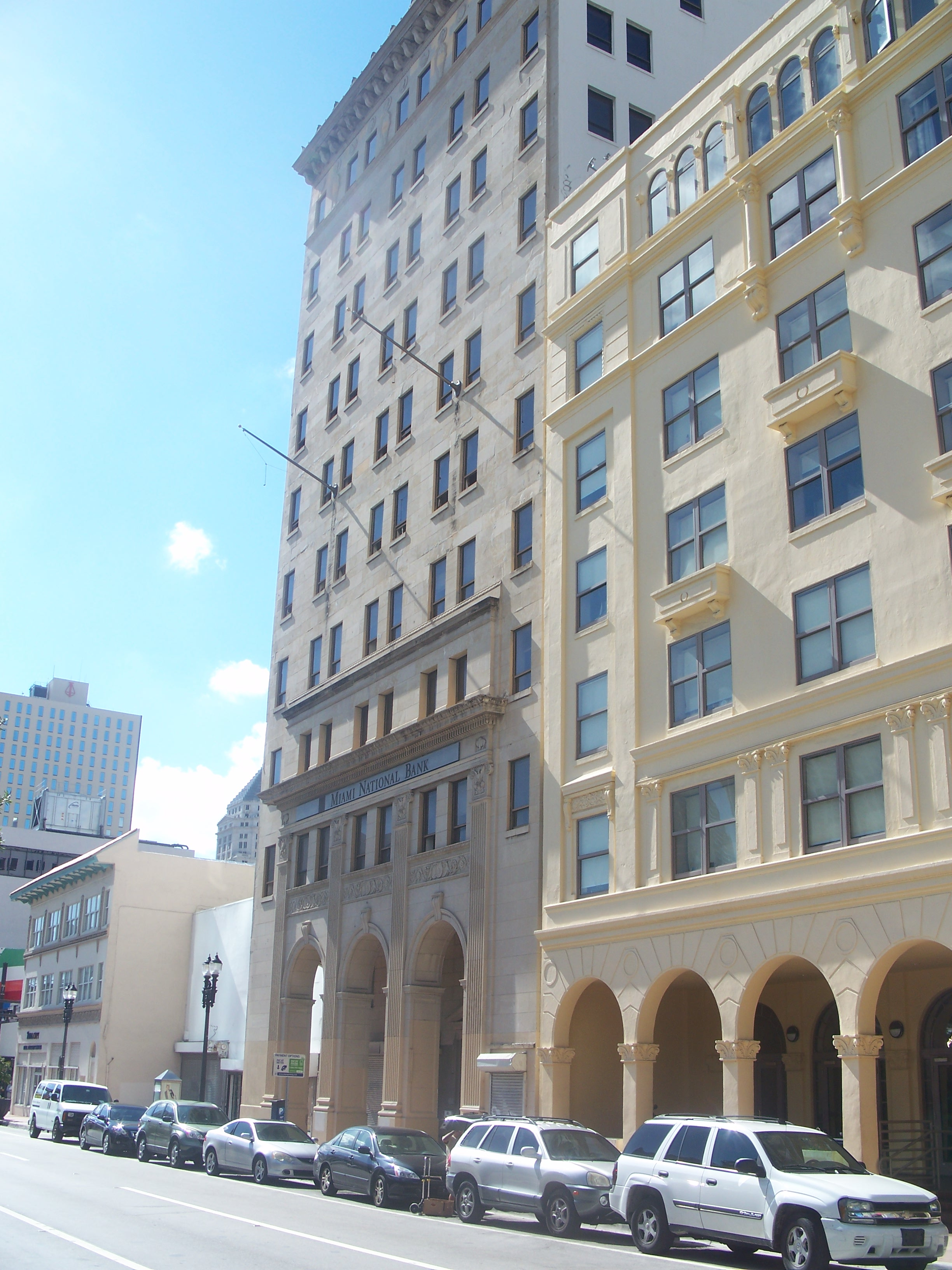
City National Bank Building, 1925

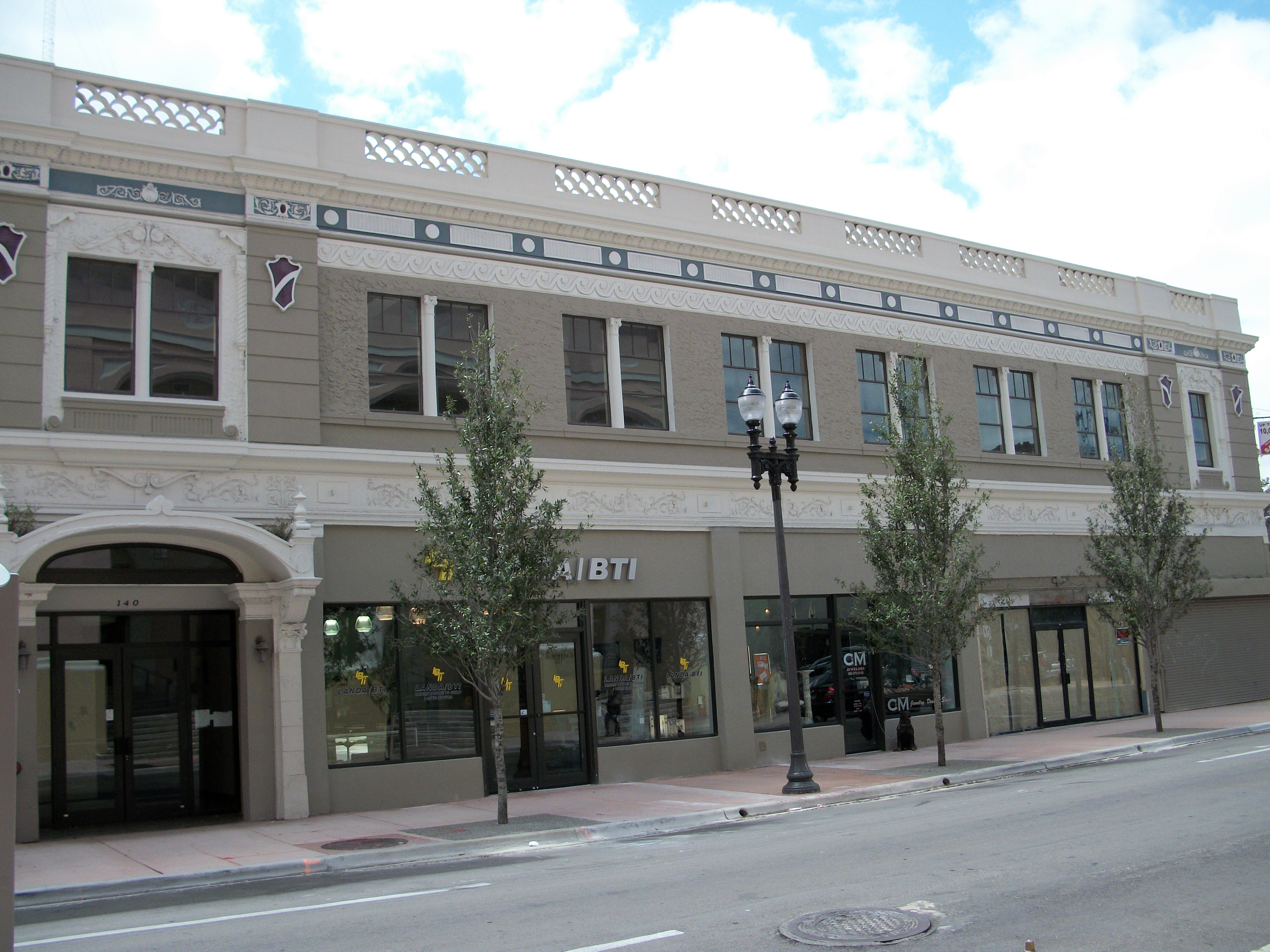
Hahn Building, 1921

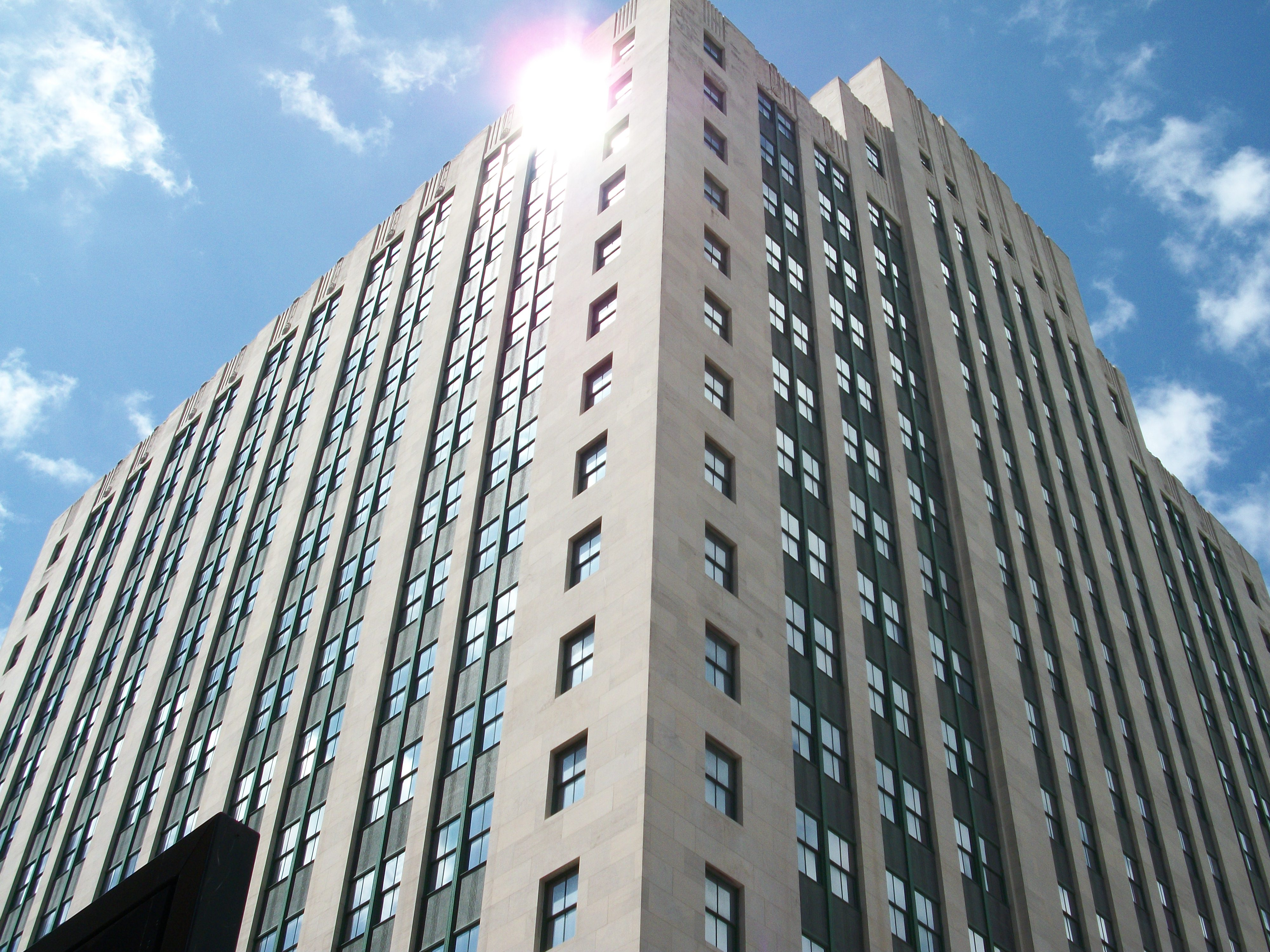
Alfred I. DuPont Building, 1939

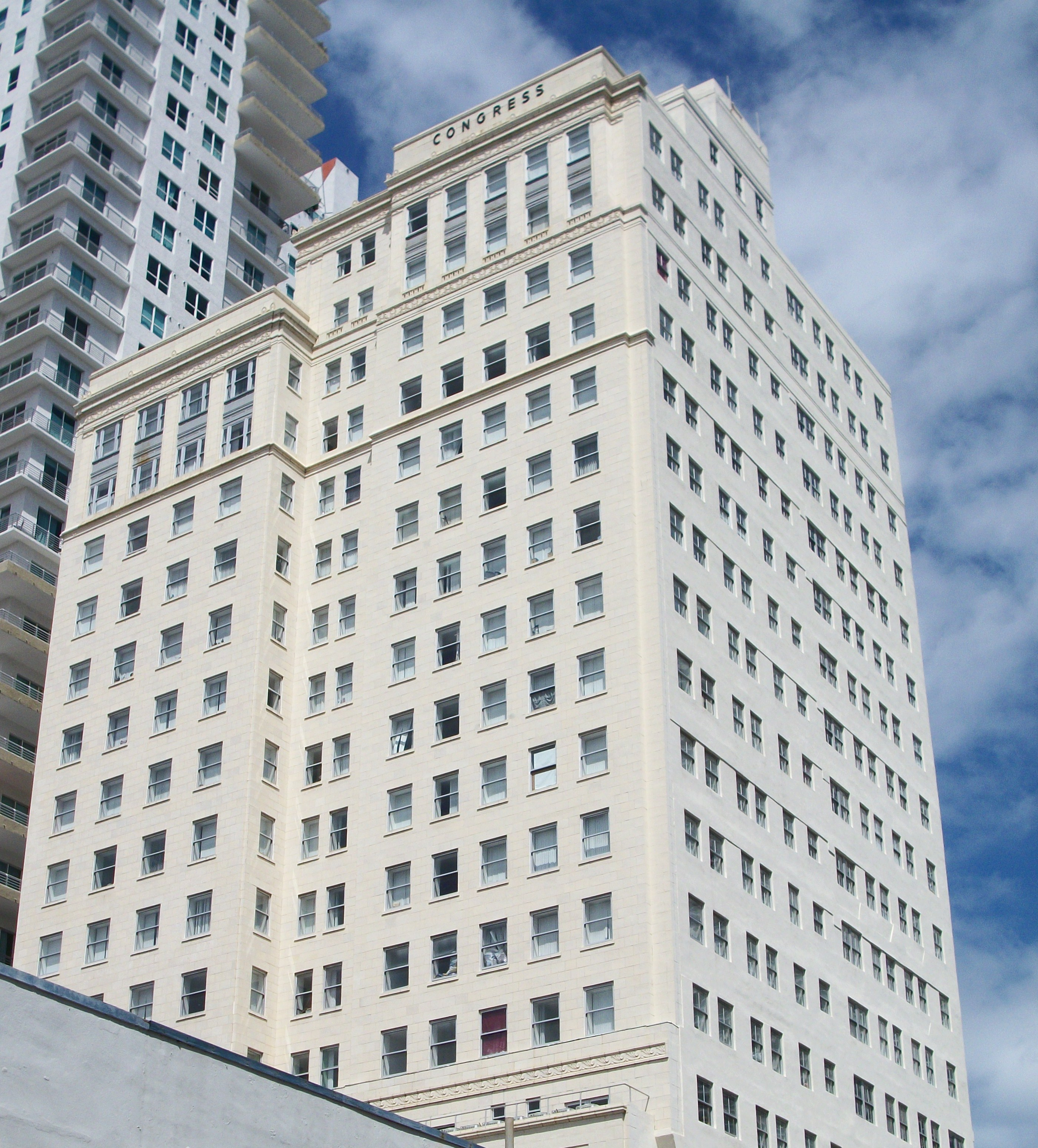
The Congress Building, 1923

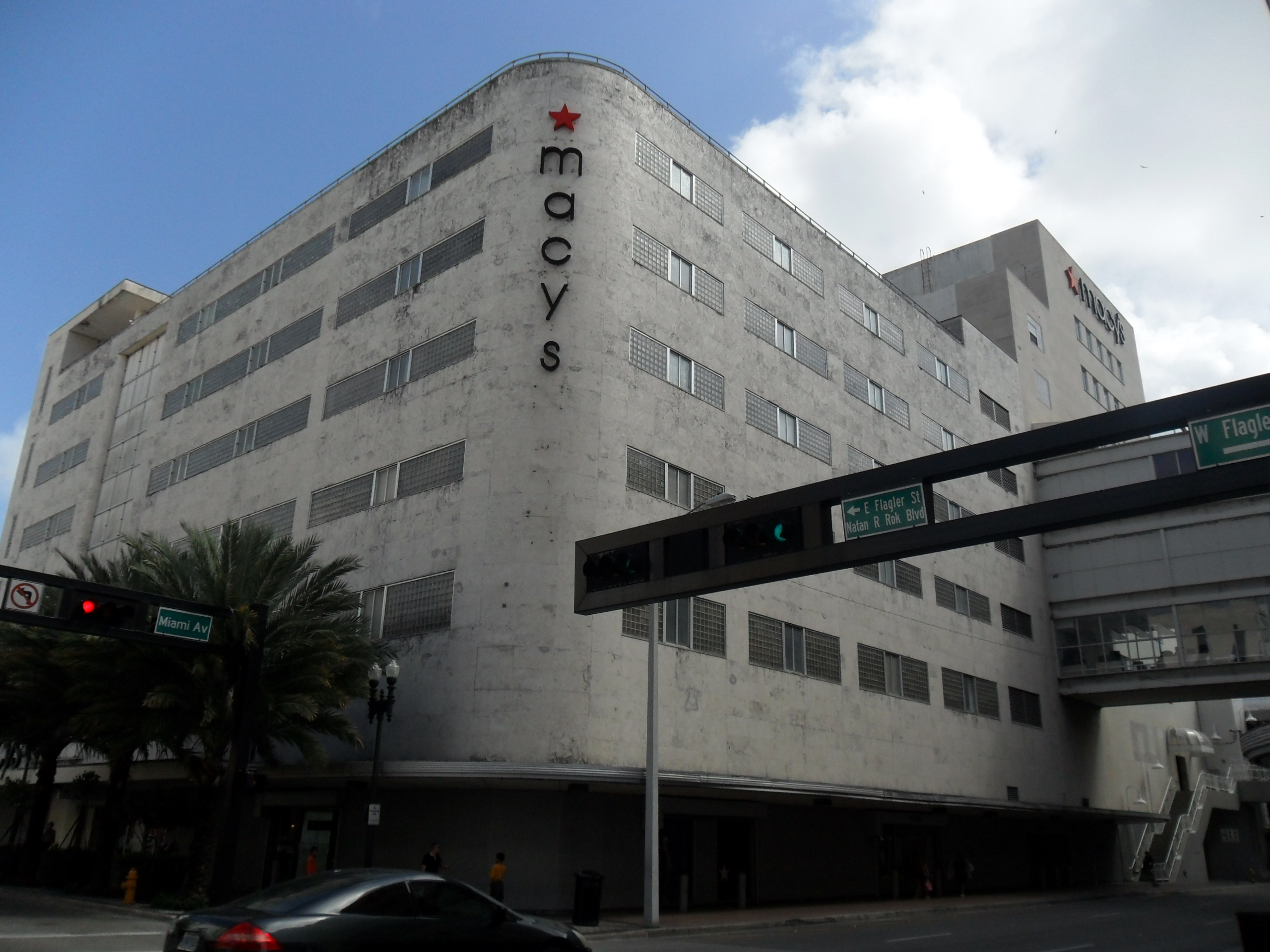
Burdines department store, 1912

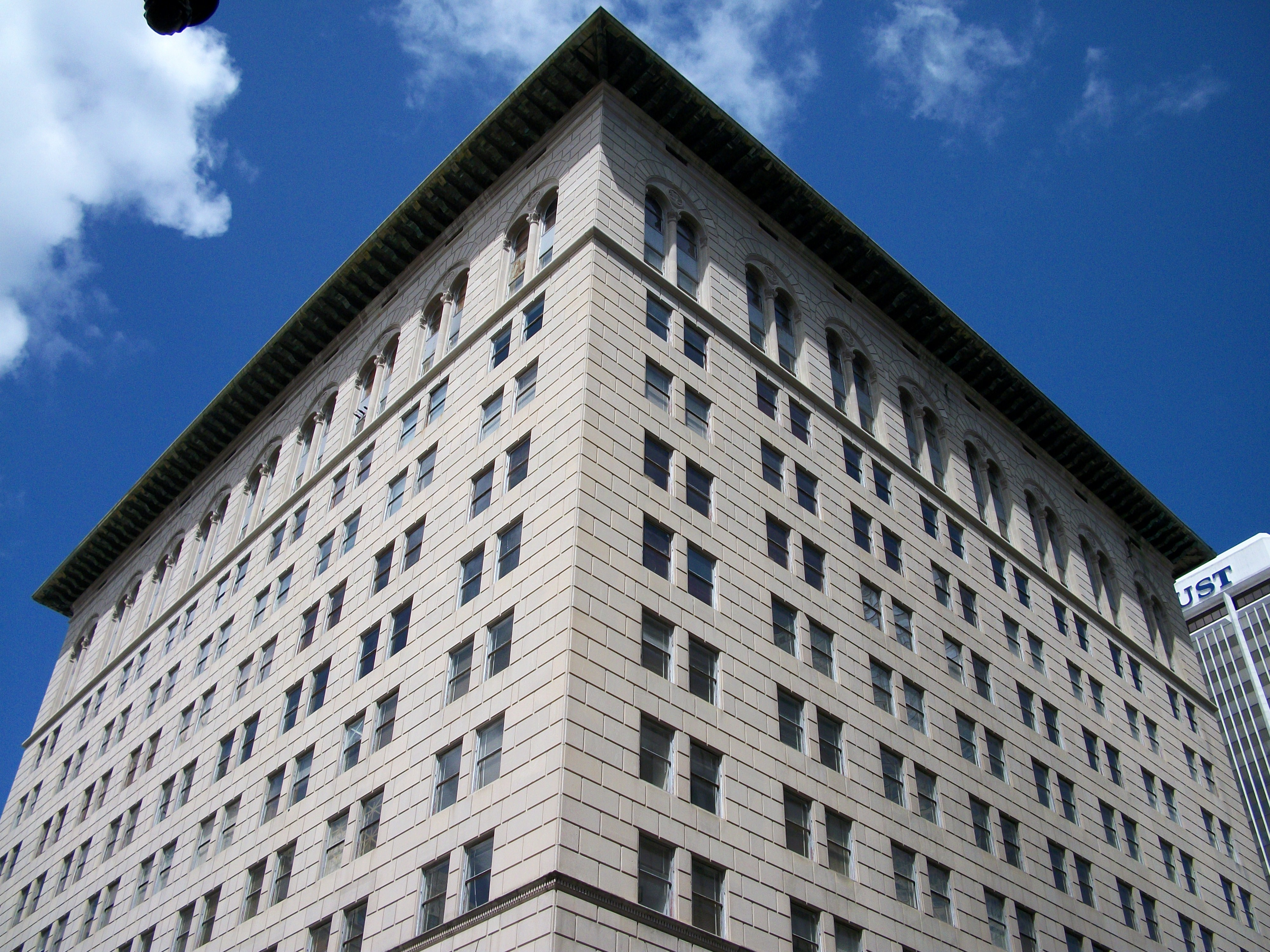
Ingraham Building, 1926

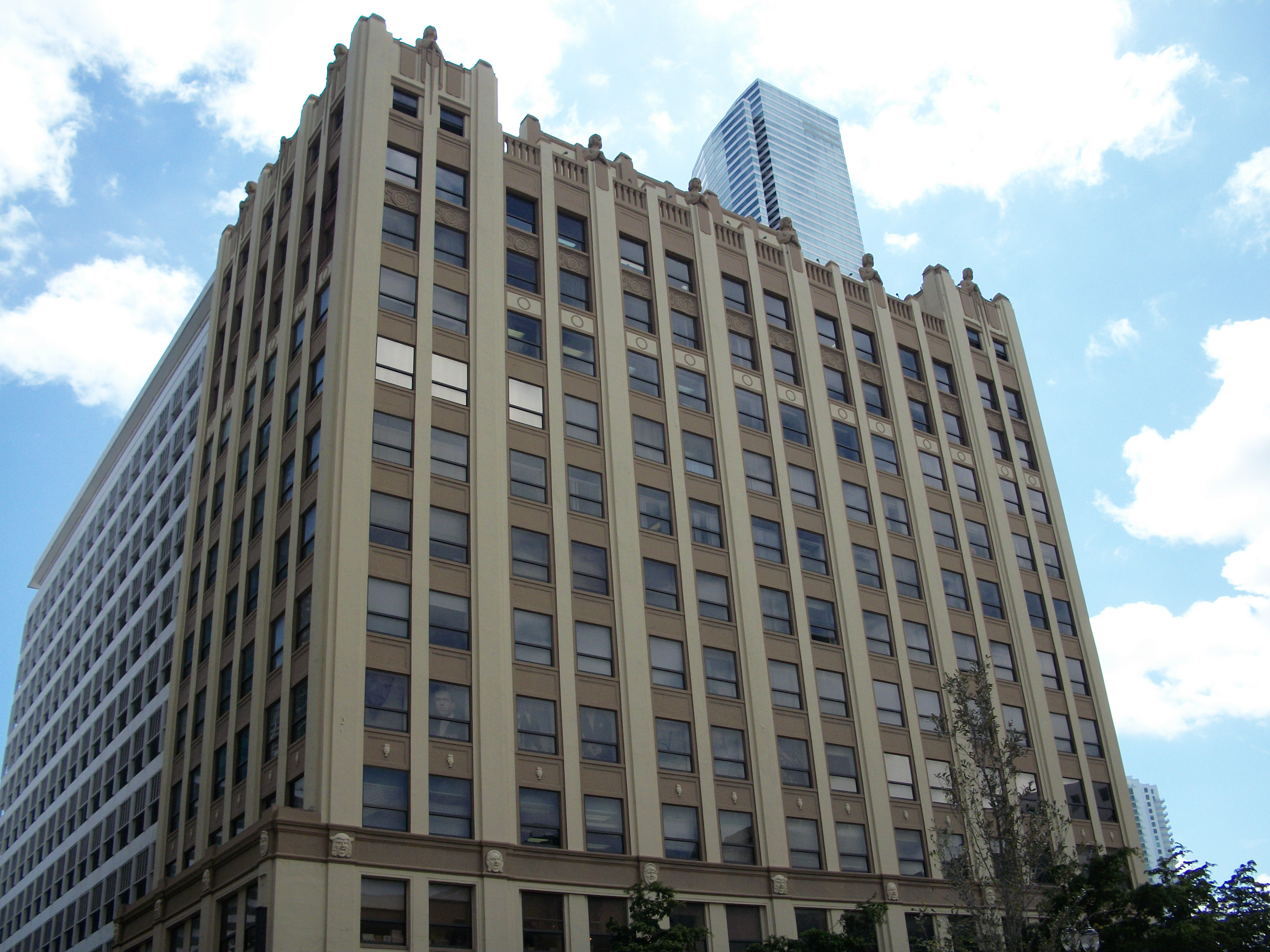
Huntington Building, 1925

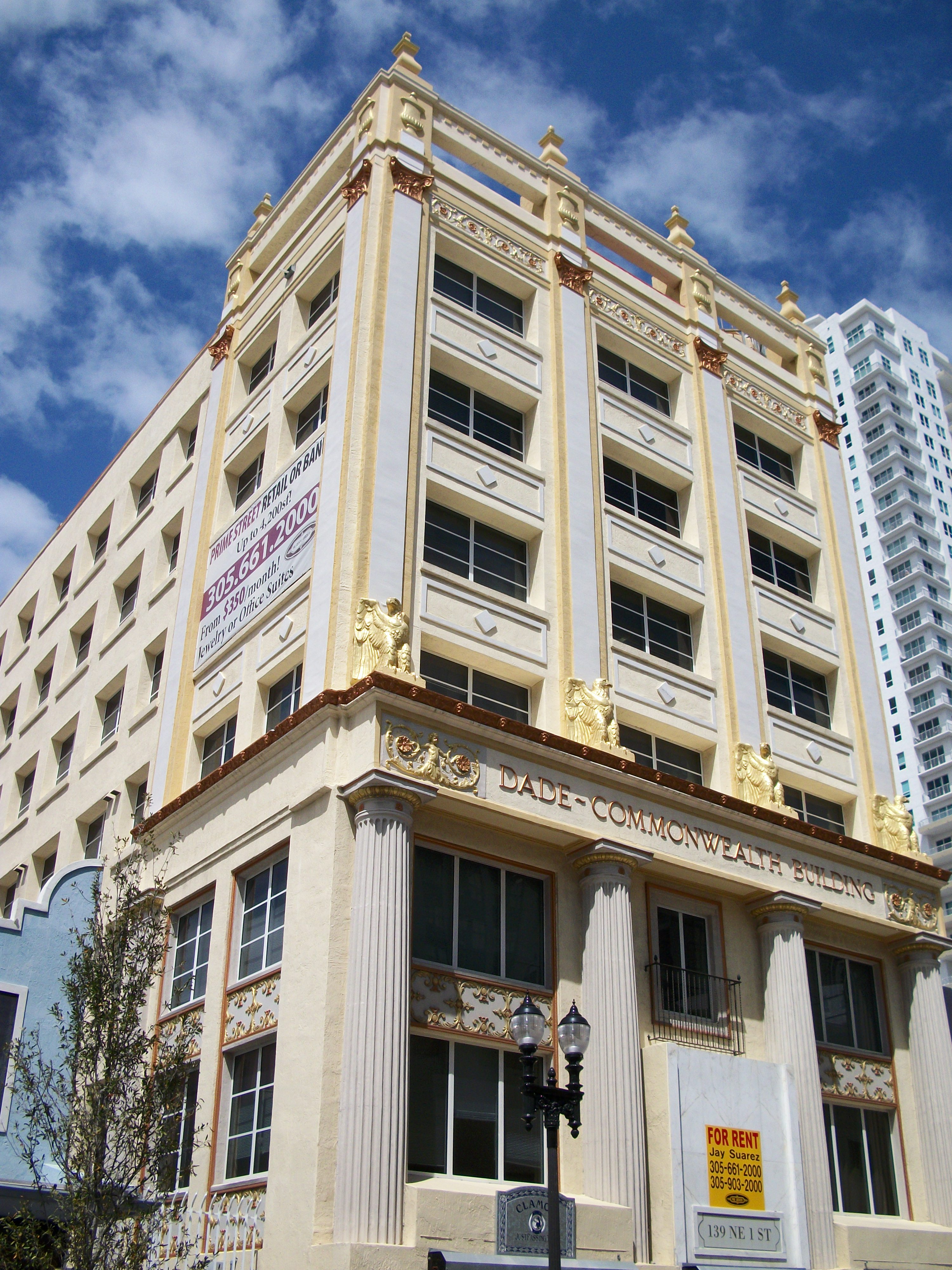
Meyer-Kiser Building, 1925

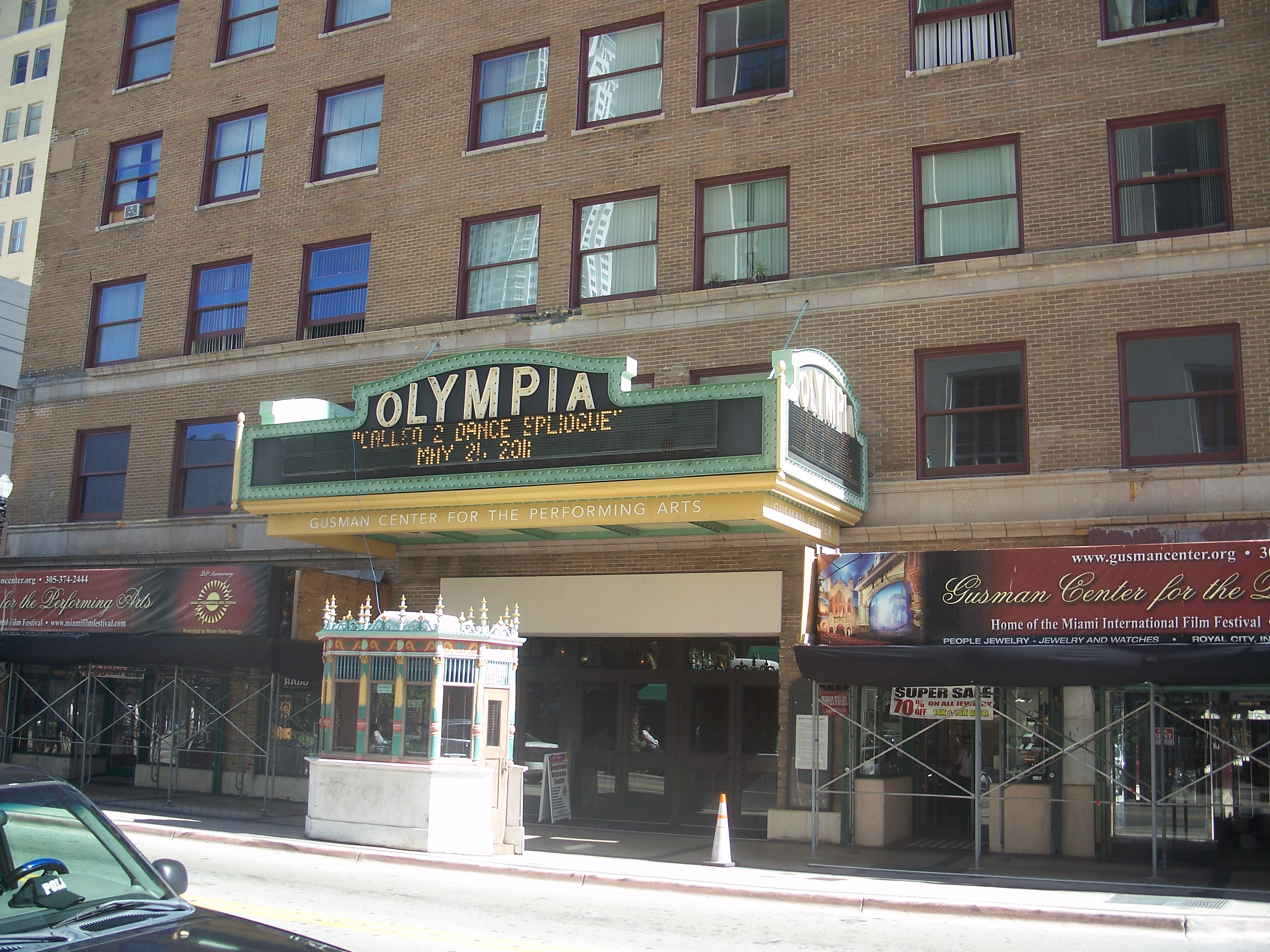
Olympia Theater, 1926

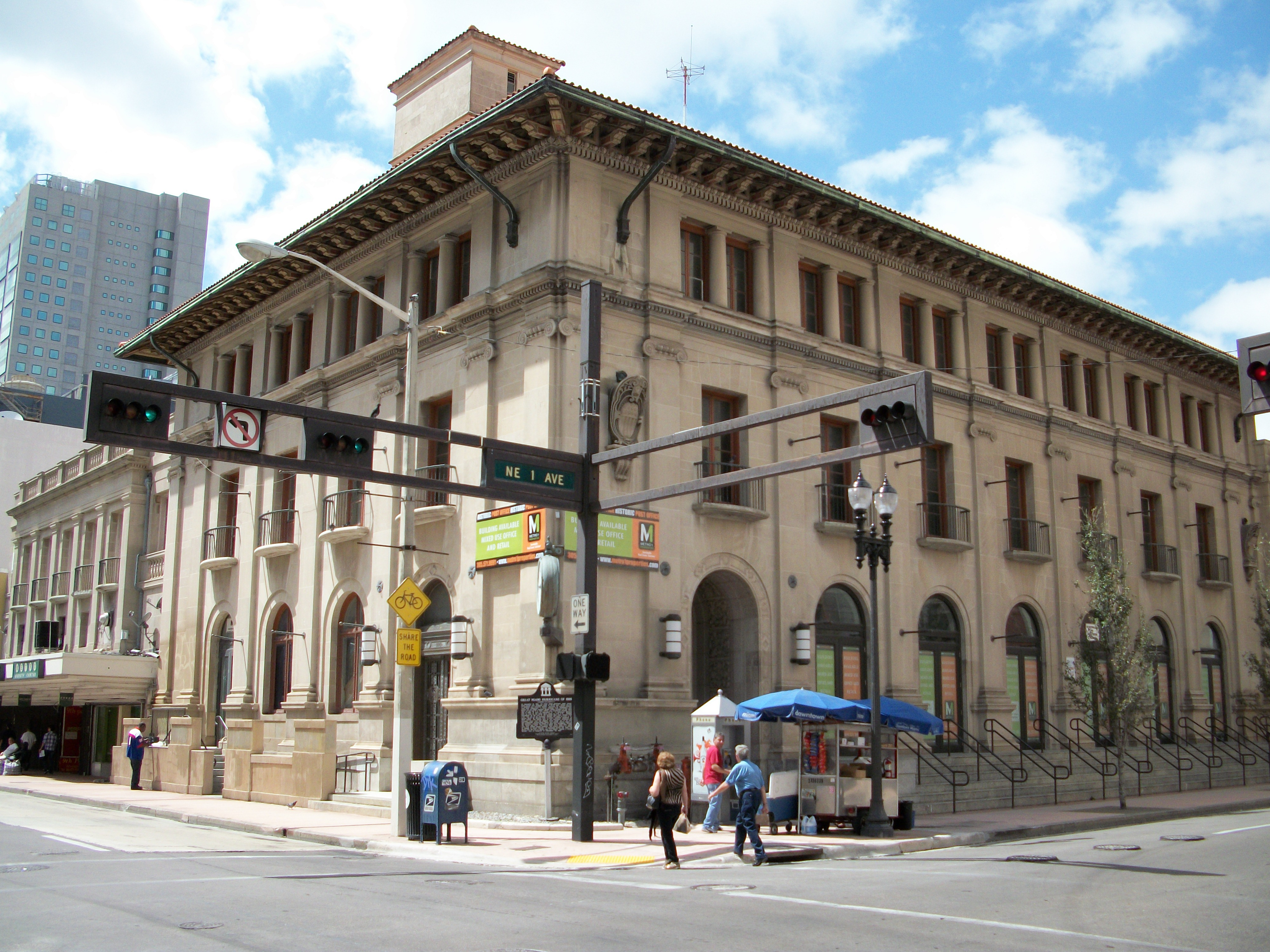
Old U.S. Post Office and Courthouse, 1917

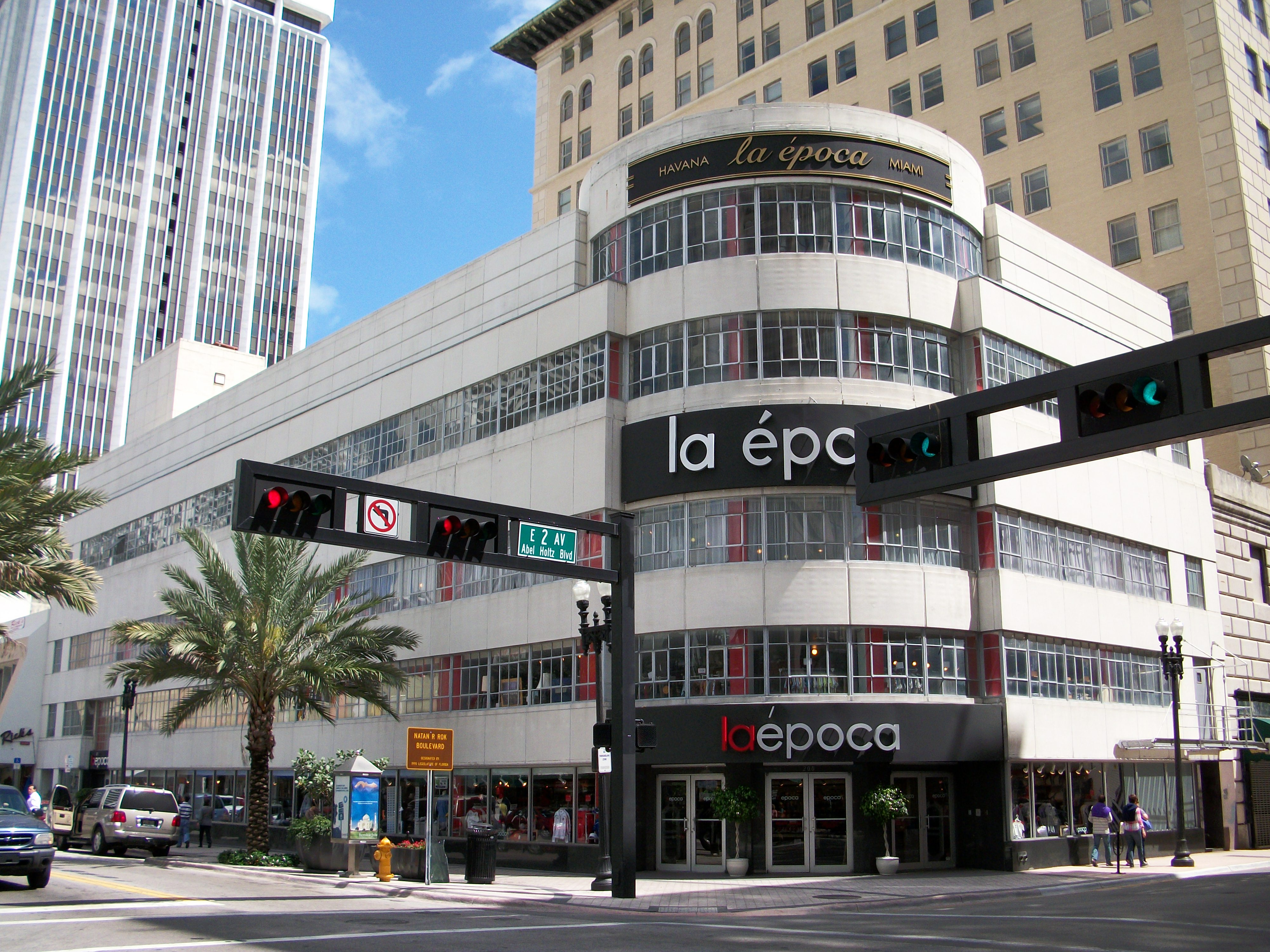
Old Walgreens/La Época Department Store, 1936

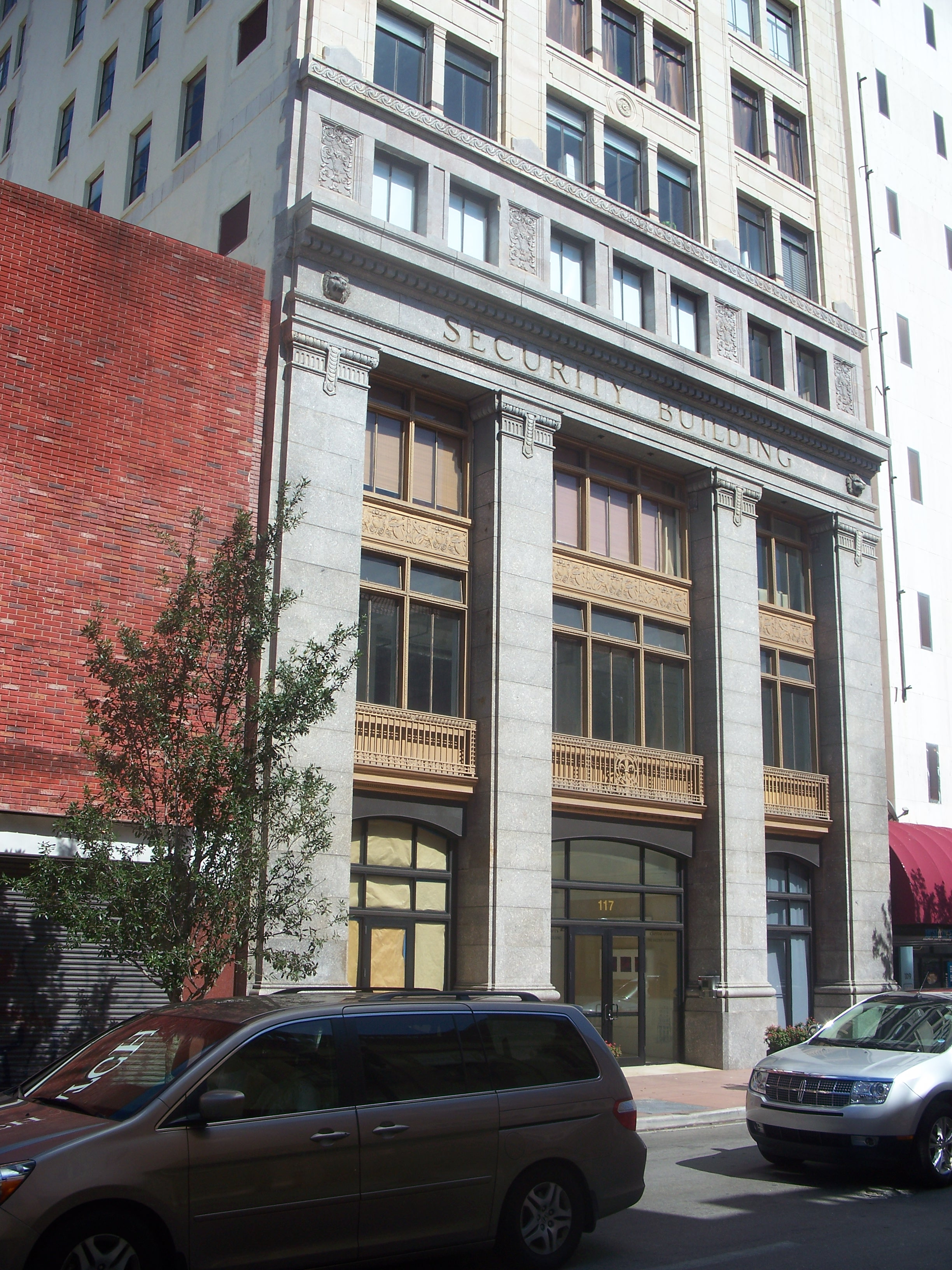
Security Building, 1926

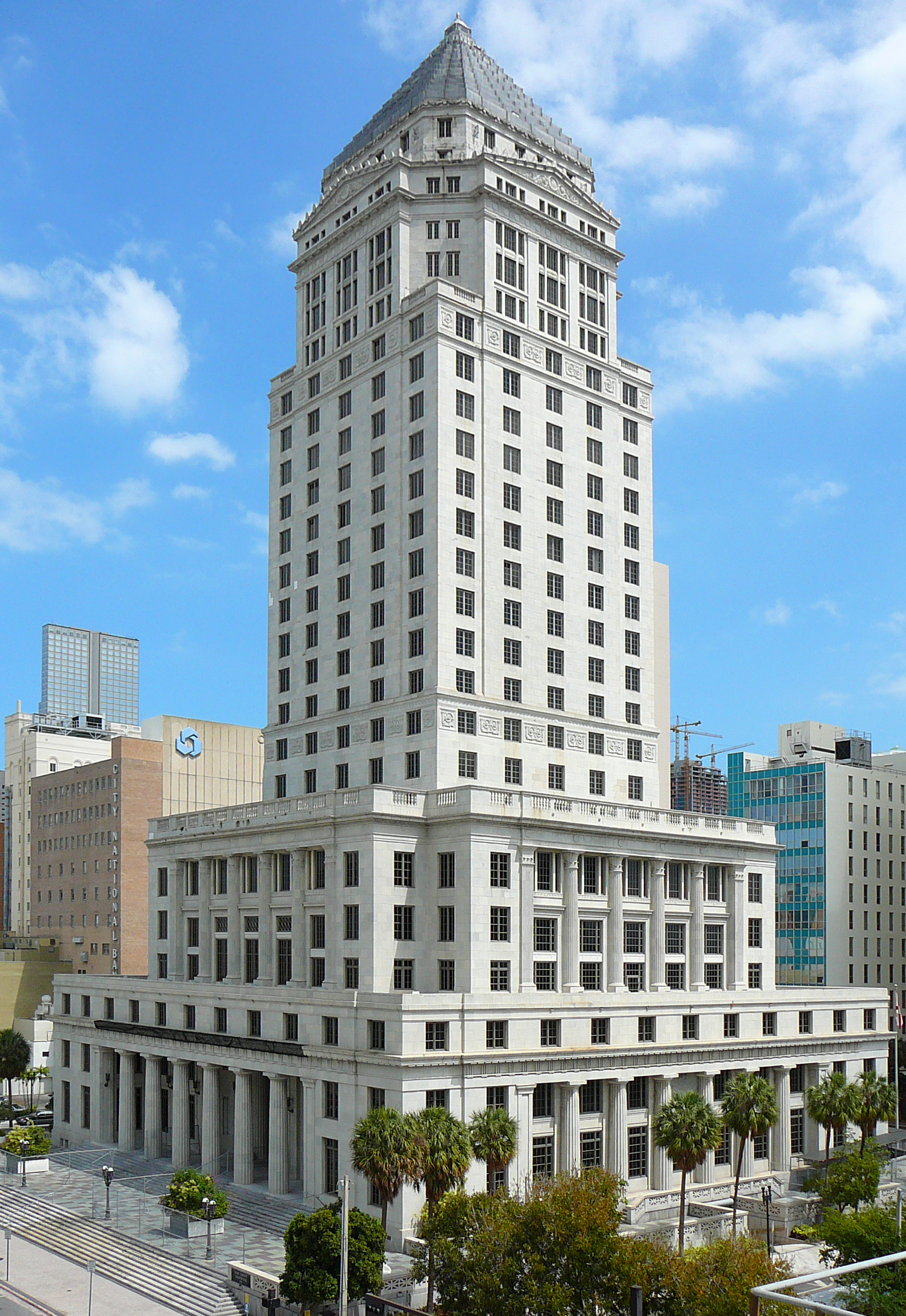
Miami-Dade County Courthouse, 1926

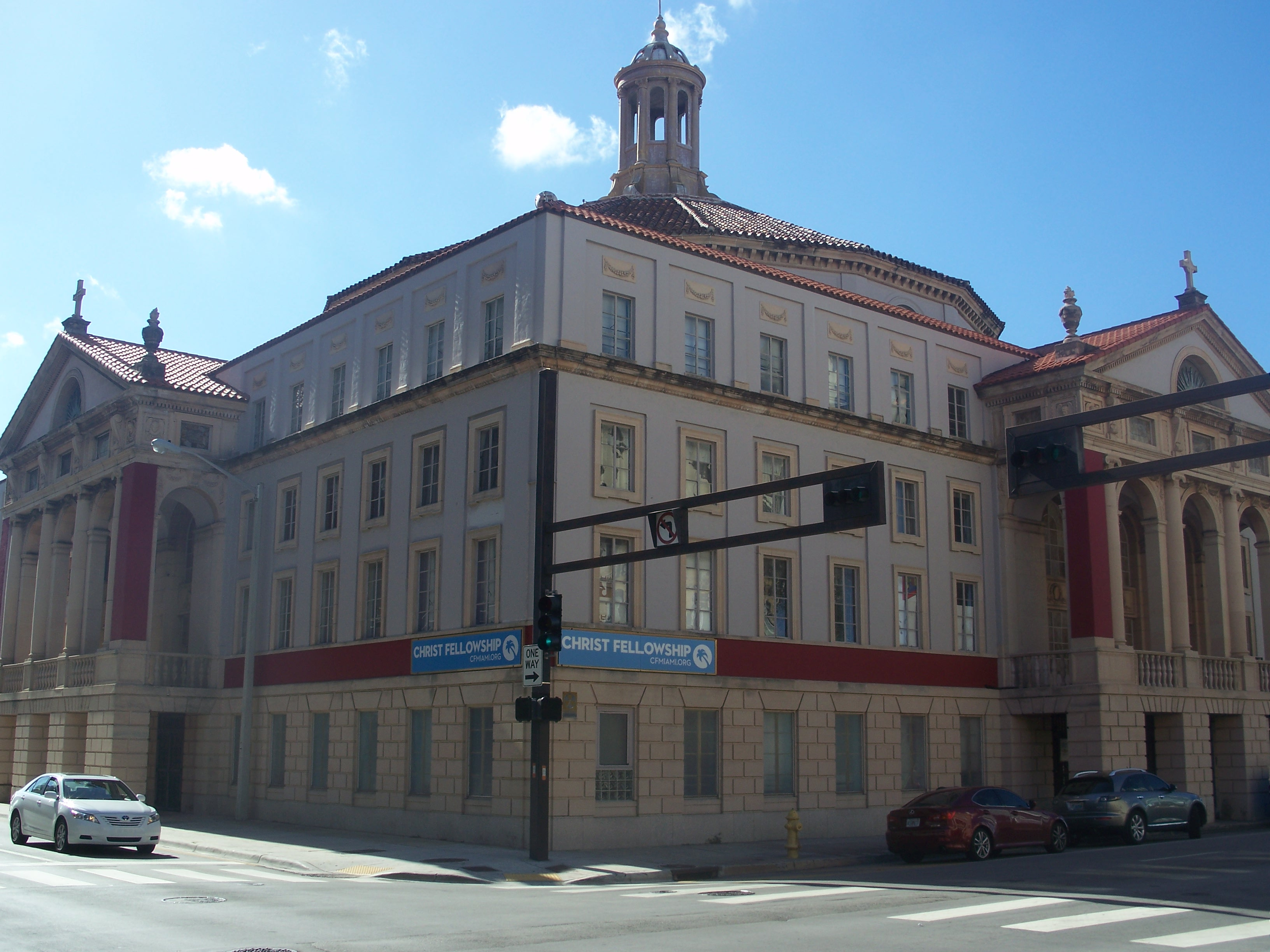
Central Baptist Church, 1925

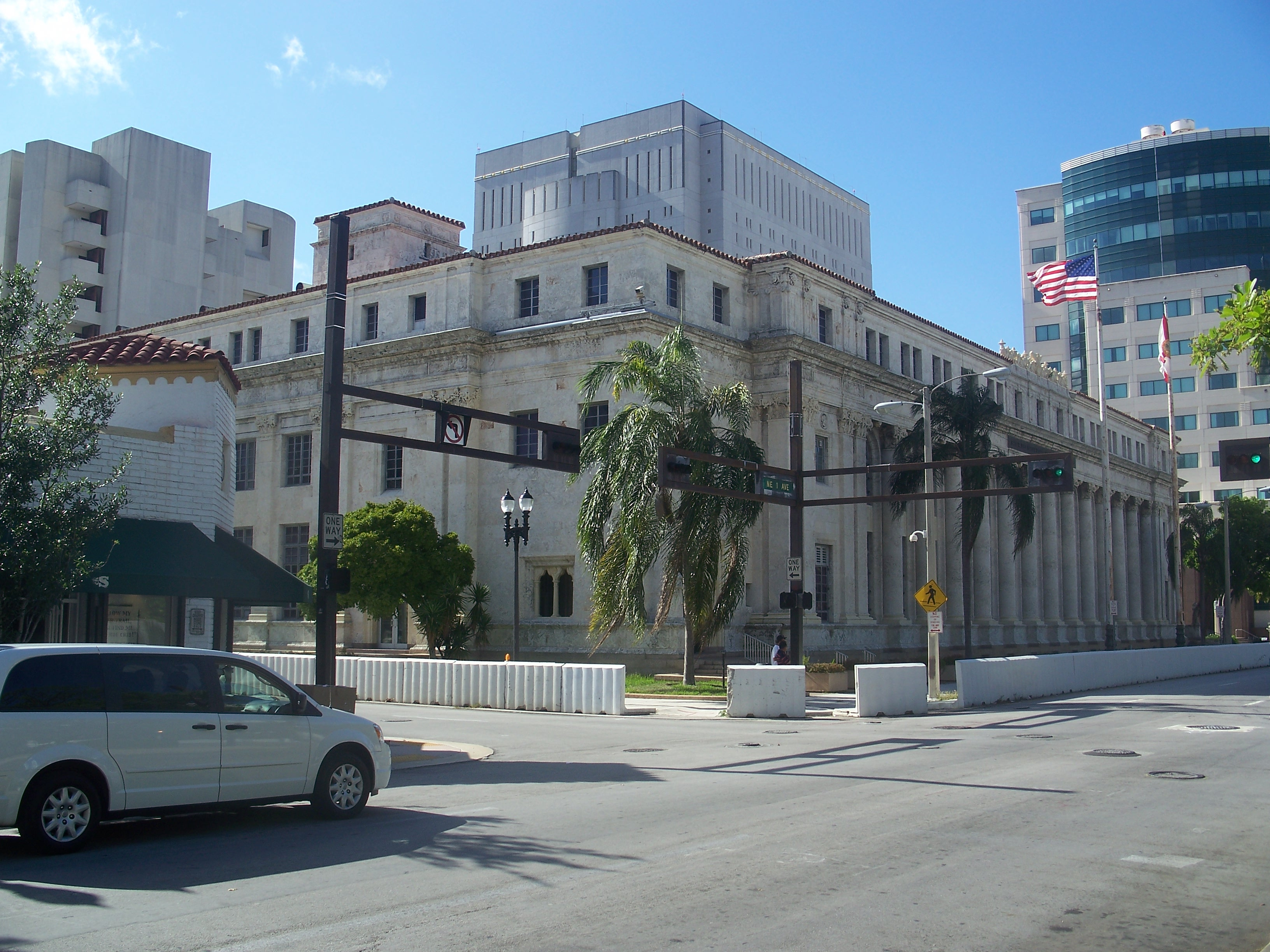
David W. Dyer Federal Building and United States Courthouse, 1931

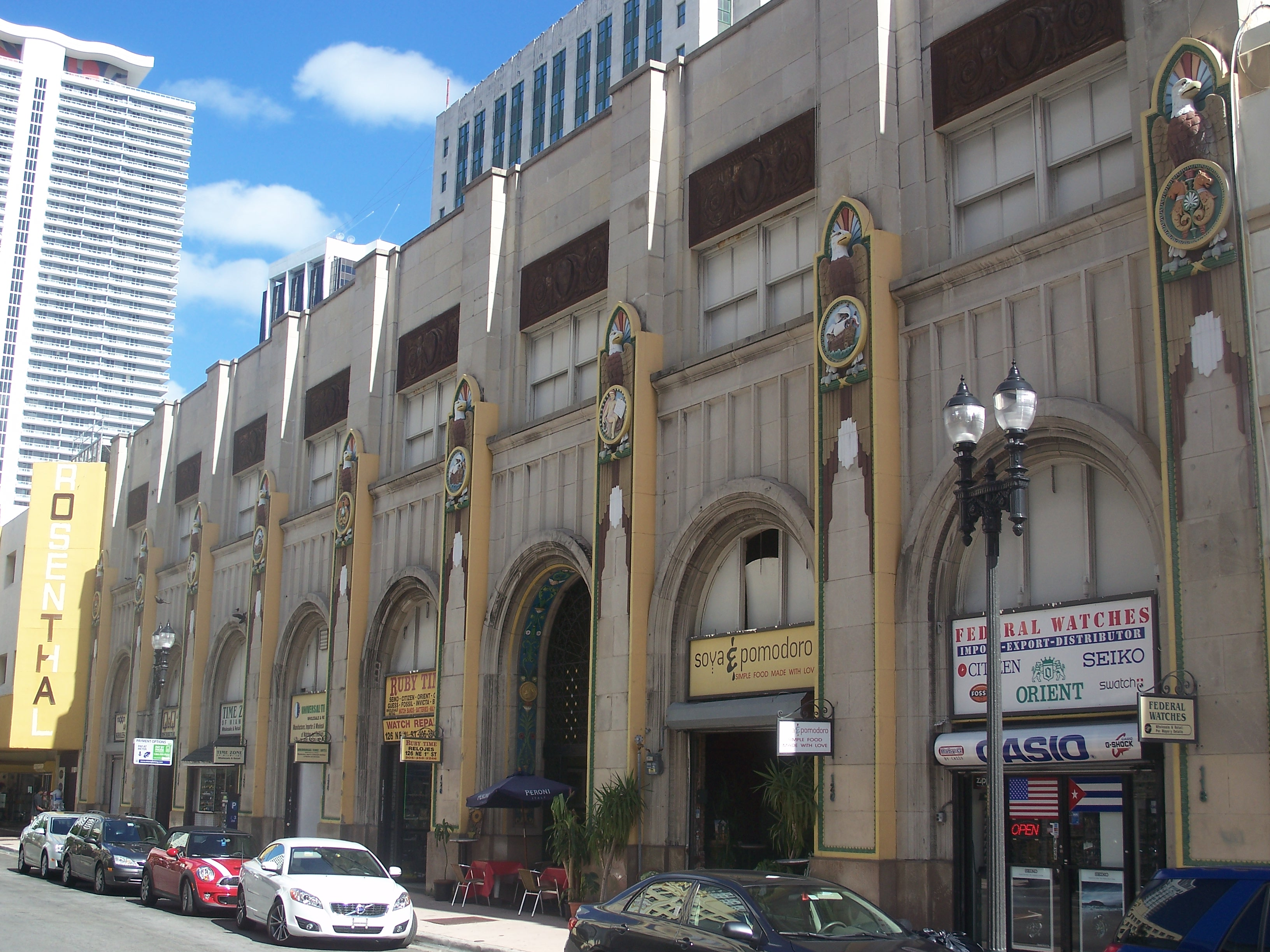
Shoreland Arcade, 1925

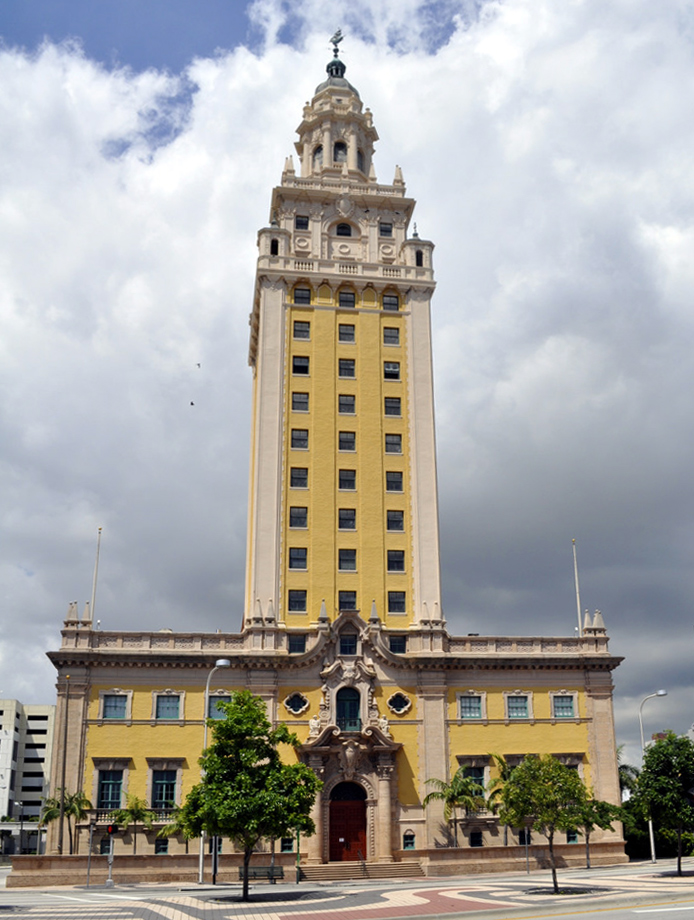
Freedom Tower, 1925

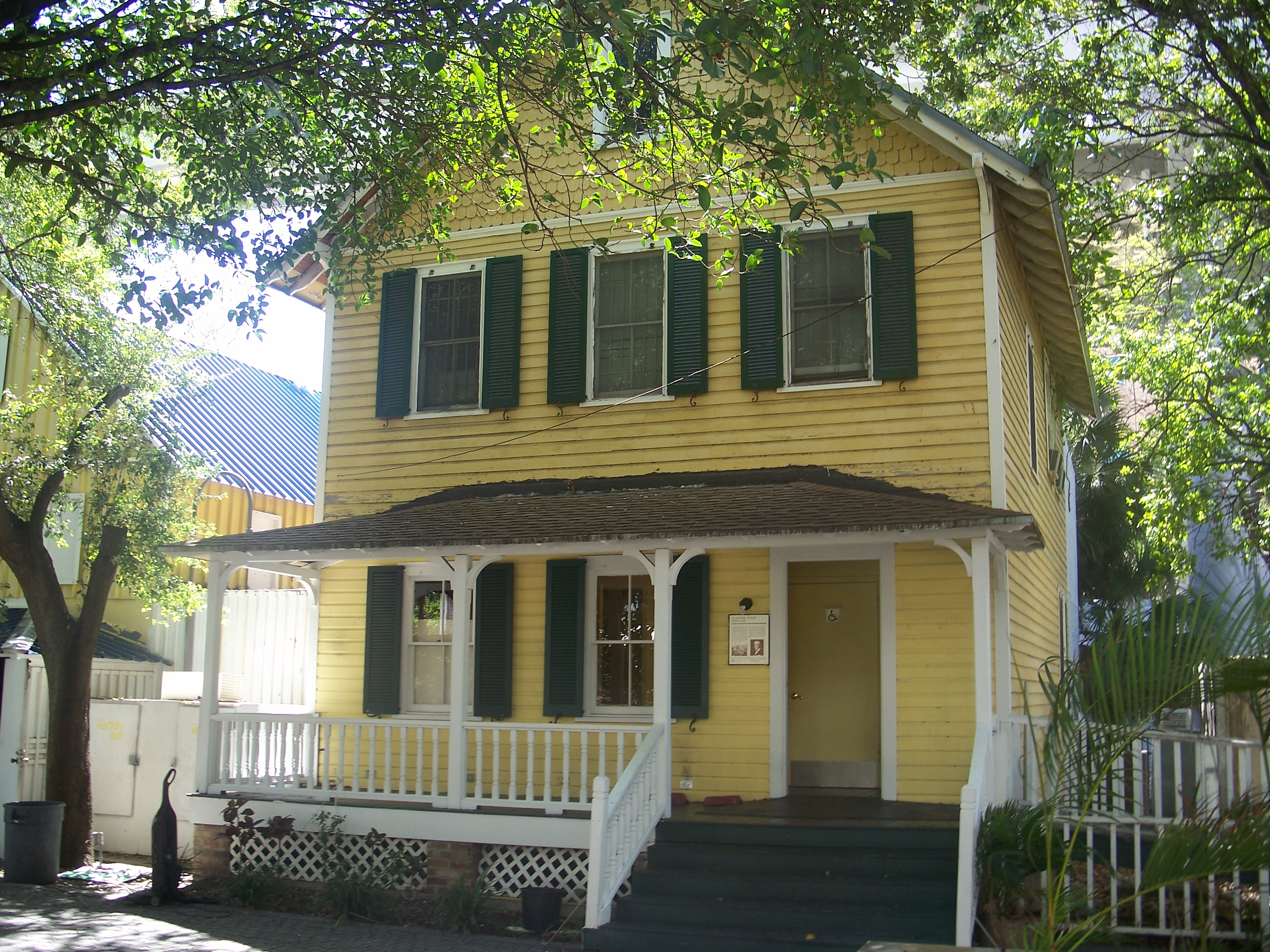
Palm Cottage, 1897- one of the oldest structures in Downtown

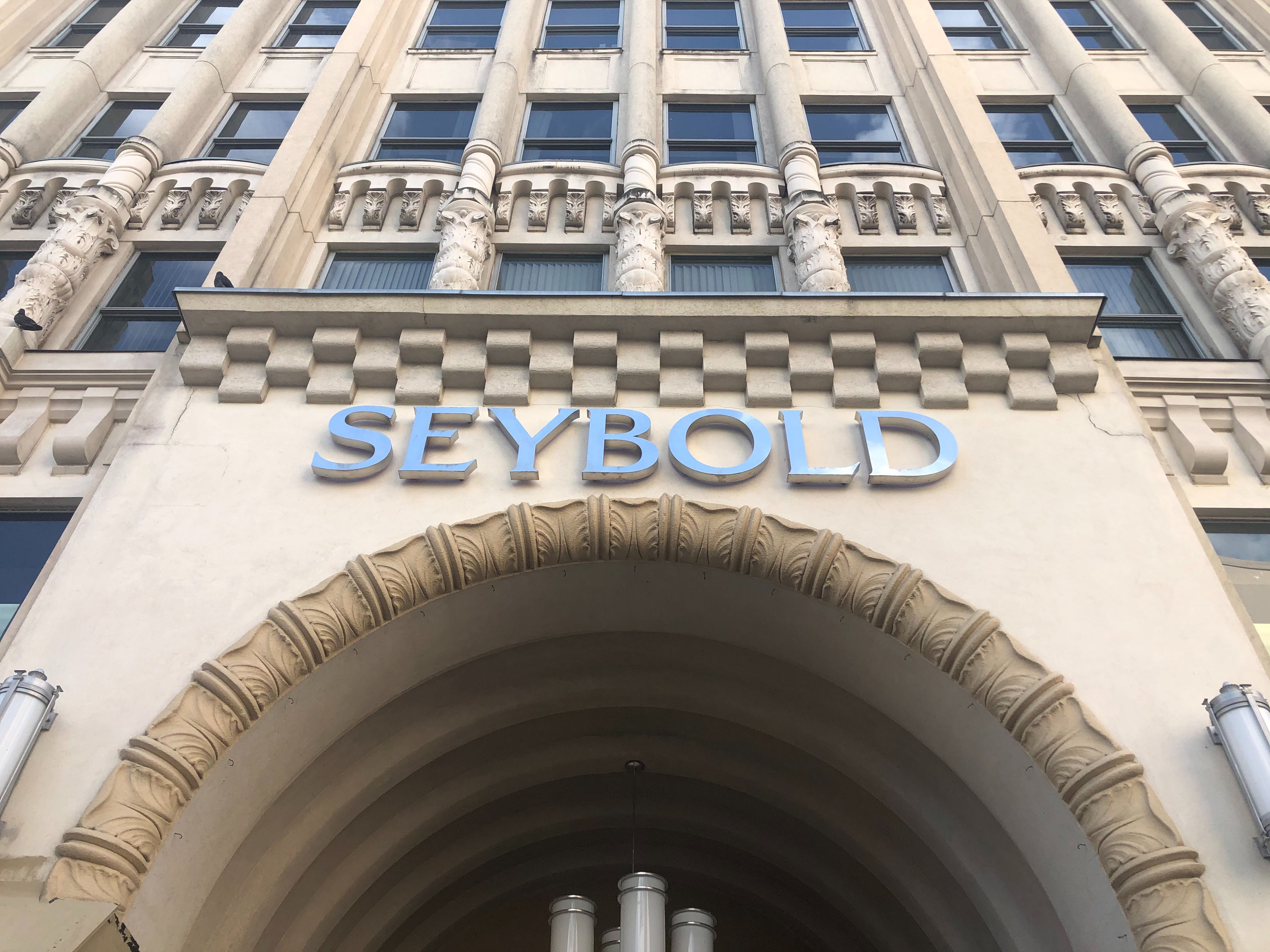
Seybold Building in Miami, Florida

== See also ==
- Greater Downtown Miami
- Lummus Park Historic District
- National Register of Historic Places listings in Miami, Florida
- Downtown Miami Multiple Resource Area
