= Old United States Post Office and Courthouse (Miami, Florida) =

- Old U.S. Post Office and Courthouse
- U.S. National Register of Historic Places
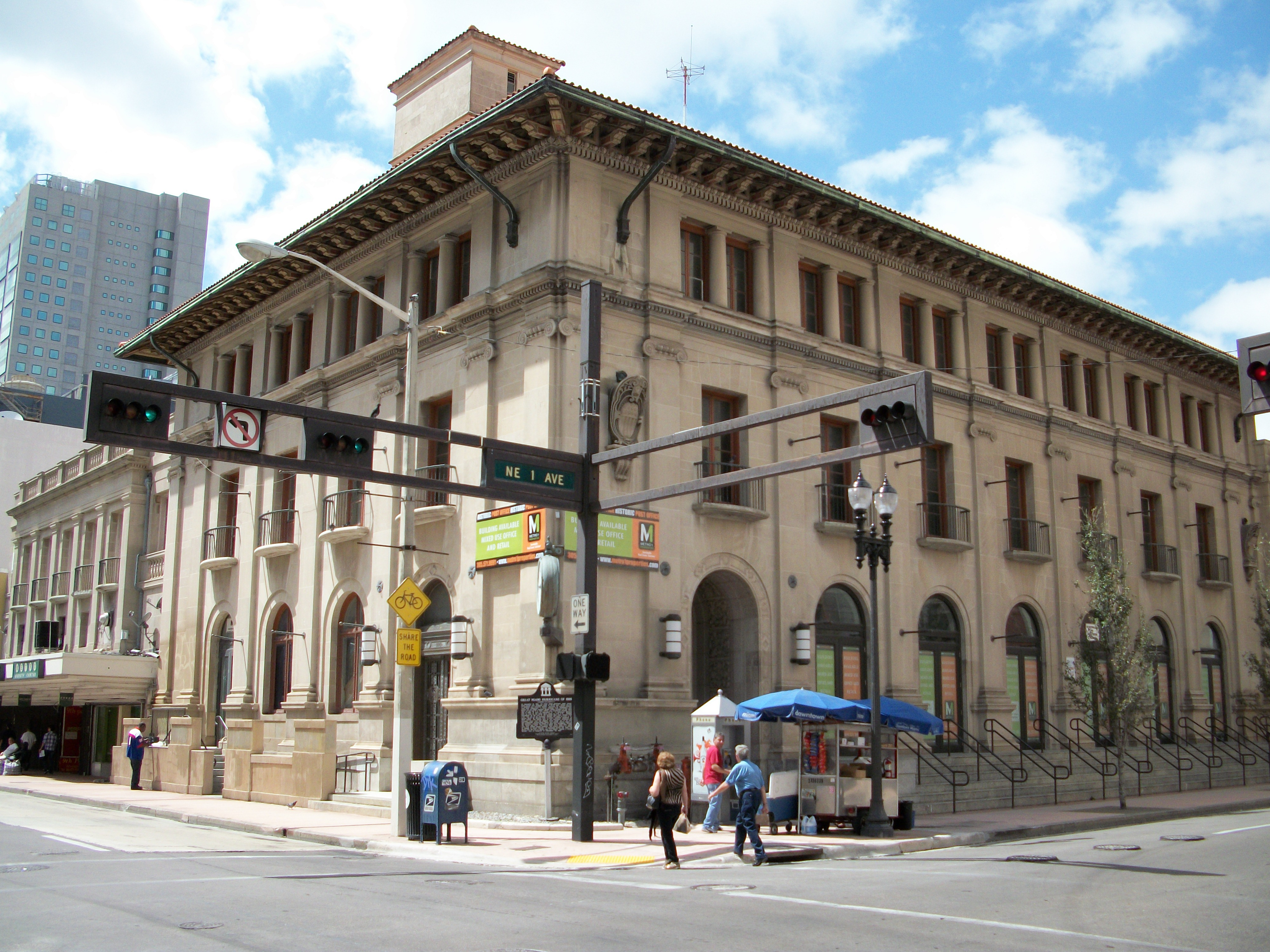

- Location within Miami Location within Florida Location within the United States
- Location: Miami, Florida
- Coordinates: 25°46′31.3854″N 80°11′31.8402″W
- NRHP reference No.: 88002962
- Added to NRHP: January 4, 1989

The Old U.S. Post Office and Courthouse is a historic courthouse in Miami, Florida. It is located at 100-118 Northeast 1st Avenue. Constructed over three years (1912–14), it was designed by Kiehnel and Elliott and Oscar Wenderoth. It was added to the U.S. National Register of Historic Places on January 4, 1989. The Miami-Dade County Tax Records say this building was built in 1917 .

In August, 1914, the Miami Weather Bureau Office was relocated from the Bank of Bay Biscayne Building to the third floor of the old federal building. Weather instruments were installed on the roof of the building. Richard Gray (1874-1960) was the Official-in-Charge. It was from this location that the warnings from the Weather Bureau Central Office in Washington were disseminated for the Great Miami Hurricane of 1926 and the Okeechobee Hurricane of 1928. The Miami Weather Bureau Office remained on the third floor from 1914 to 1929, although the weather instruments were moved to the Seybold Building in 1927.

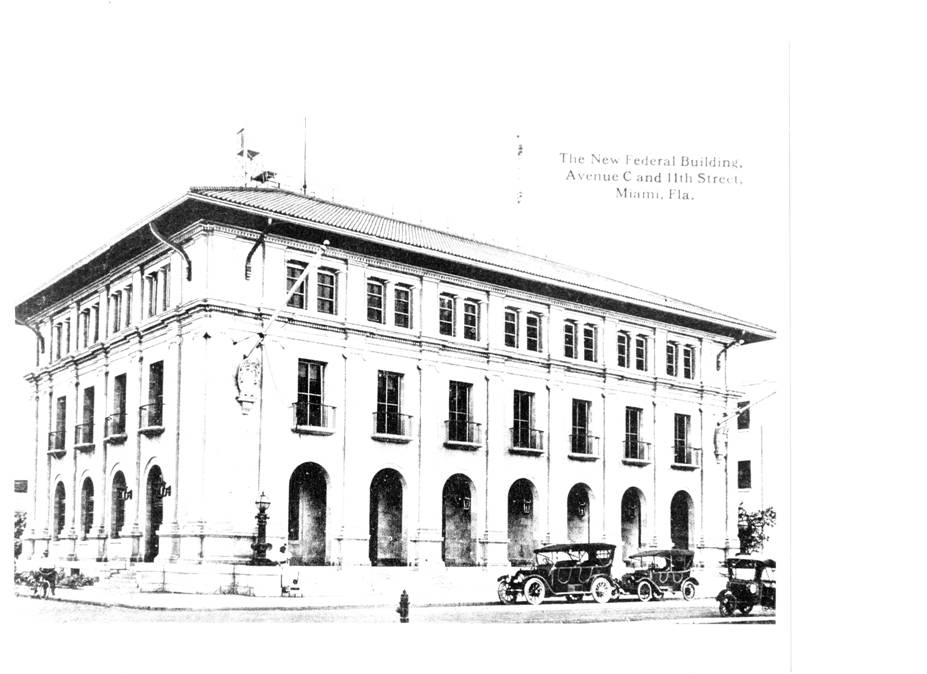
Old Miami Federal Building circa 1917, showing weather instruments

Dr. William Homer Walker created First Federal Savings and Loan Association of Miami in 1933, when he acquired the first federal savings and loan charter ever issued in the United States. The original name of the institution was the First Federal Savings and Loan Association of Miami. Because it had outgrown two former locations, Walker purchased the abandoned Miami Post Office and Federal Court Building in May 1937 to house his savings and loan. In 1973 the bank moved to the thirty-two story First Federal Building, later known as the AmeriFirst Building and now known as One Downtown, at One Southeast 3rd Avenue in downtown Miami.

== See also ==
- List of United States post offices
