= Bernard K. Passman =

American sculptor

Bernard K. Passman (22 January 1916 – 10 February 2007) was a sculptor and jeweller, founder of a black coral jewellery company and brand, Passman (currently produced by Glyptica, Inc. under licence).

Passman founded the eponymous Passman in 1975 on Grand Cayman. He created black coral and gold sculptures for the White House, the British royal family, and various museums. Examples of his work include the Cayman Islands's gift of a 97-piece set of sterling silver and black coral tableware for Prince Charles and Lady Diana's wedding in 1981; a black coral horse and corgi dogs for Queen Elizabeth and Prince Philip, and commissions for the Pope and various celebrities. Other well-known works are his Can Can Girls and his statues of Charlie Chaplin.

Passman died in 2007 aged 91. His company was acquired the same year by Cayman Islands-based Active Capital Ltd. This is a private equity firm belonging to the family that founded Dart Container. There were Bernard K. Passman galleries and retail outlets in Charlotte Amalie, United States Virgin Islands, George Town, Cayman Islands, Las Vegas, Beverly Hills, etc. In May 2013 the galleries and business faced closure after the CEO of the past owner of Passman, GEM Manufacturing LLC pleaded guilty to illegally importing a batch of black coral.

In 2014 the production of the Passman collection was renewed using sustainably harvested black coral when Glyptica, Inc. under Tchavdar Tchouchev (previously Passman's Director of Design Development), had acquired the licence.
