= Passman =

Jewelry business

- Industry: Jewelry
- Founded: 1975
- Founder: Bernard K. Passman
- Headquarters: Villeurbanne, France
- Products: Black coral jewelry; coral earrings, necklaces, bracelets, pendants; gold and black coral sculptures
- Website: passmanjewelry.com

Passman (also called Passman Jewelry) is a line of black coral jewelry currently produced by Brindle & Fig under license.

== History ==
The brand was created in 1975 by Bernard Passman, sculptor and jeweler, on Grand Cayman. Examples of the company's work include gold and black coral sculptures for the White House, a gold and black coral crucifix sculpture for the Pope, the Cayman Islands's gift of a 97-piece set of sterling silver and black coral tableware for Prince Charles and Lady Diana's wedding in 1981, a miniature set for the birth of Prince William, and a black coral horse and corgi dogs for Queen Elizabeth and Prince Philip.

After Bernard Passman's death in 2007, the company was acquired by Cayman Islands-based Active Capital Ltd. In 2013 the company closed and production temporarily stopped. Prior to that the company had galleries and retail outlets in Charlotte Amalie, United States Virgin Islands, George Town, Cayman Islands, Las Vegas, Beverly Hills, and at other locations.
