= Seybold Building =

Building in Miami, Florida, U.S.

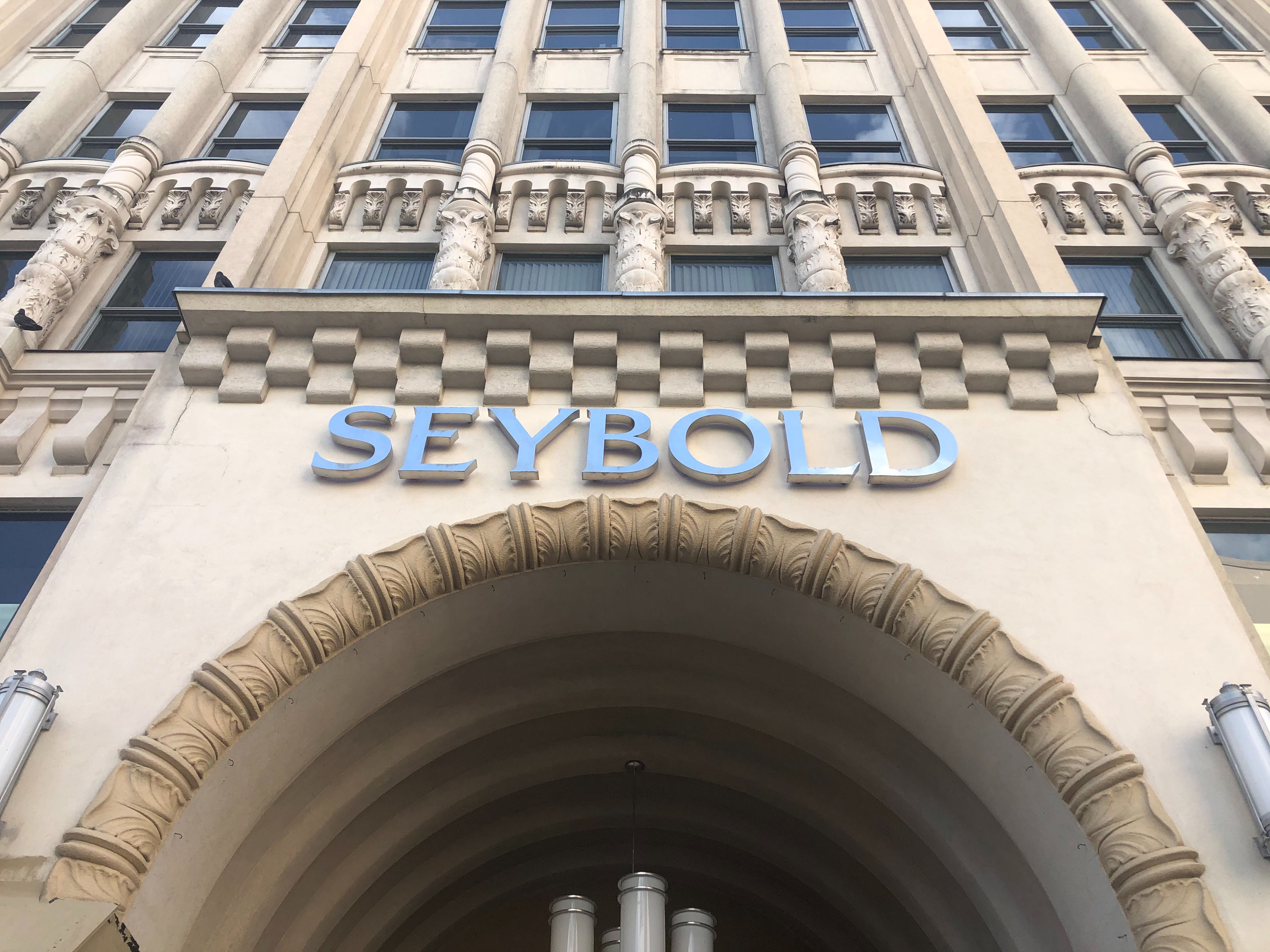
Seybold Building in Miami, Florida

Seybold Building is a historic jewelry building in Miami, Florida. It was designed by Kiehnel and Elliott. The building was erected in two stages. The first three levels of the building were completed in 1921. John Seybold had a bakery and confectionery business which he operated on the main floor. An additional seven stories were added above the annex in 1925. The Seybold Building is a City of Miami historic landmark. Seybold sold the complex in 1941. It is a National Register of Historic Places contributing property as part of the Downtown Miami Historic District.

== History ==
The Seybold building was built back in 1926 as the brainchild of its namesake, John Seybold, who moved to Miami in the late 19th century and eventually set up a bakery. That business burned down, but he bounced back with another bakery. He then went on to run a shopping mall, called an arcade back then, that became the basis of the 10-story Seybold building, which is the second largest diamond and jewelry center in the United States at 166,000 square feet (15,400 m^{2}). The plan to transform the Seybold Building into a jeweler's hub had a helping hand from the Cuban revolution. At the start of the Cuban Revolution, Fidel Castro directed his regime to confiscate businesses all over Cuba causing a mass exodus off the island. This resulted in Cuban goldsmiths starting manufacturing in the US with the Seybold Building being the biggest spot, where individuals continually - seven days a week manufacture from scratch diamond wedding rings. Hand made Cuban Link necklaces, all types of earrings, pendants, bracelets, & cufflink. Numerous Cuban engravers perform artisan stonesetting, specializing in engraving, fabrication & wax carving using gold, silver & precious metals. Platinum is the most durable for wedding rings, lost-wax casting using a silversmithing or goldsmithing process in which a liquid material - in this case Platinum is usually poured into a mold, which contains a hollow cavity of the desired shape, and then allowed to solidify. The solidified part is also known as a casting, which is ejected or broken out of the mold to complete the process. Platinum normally has a melting temperature of 1,700 °C (3,090 °F).

In the 1960s, the building's first jeweler moved in. Joseph Buchwald, Jeff and Marc Buchwald's grandfather, was a Hungarian immigrant who first opened his jewelry shop on the boardwalk in Atlantic City before moving to Miami to escape the cold. Today, Buchwald Jewelers is a third generation, family-run business, and co-owner Jeff Buchwald recalls visiting his family's store when he was just a kid. "We were the first jewelers in the building — back then there were a few stores and a lot of lawyers", Buchwald said. "By the time I took over 25 years ago, there were a lot more jewelers".

Mario's Casting, a second-generation family-run jewelry manufacturing business, immigrating to the United States in 1969 to try and pick up where they had left off. "In the 1970s, a lot of Cubans were coming over and making a home for their jewelry business in downtown Miami", said Martha Camero, one of the owners and operators of Mario's Casting. "As more and more jewelers moved into the Seybold Building, lawyers started moving out. Pretty soon, every single floor was filled with jewelry makers of all kinds."

== Building ==
The majority of the tenants are still jewelry and watch merchants, diamond cutters, repair shops and other specialty gem shops.

== Awards ==
The Seybold Jewelry Building was named Best Place to Buy a Diamond Ring by Miami New Times in 2009.
