= Al Passman =

Canadian football player (1923–1984)

Profile
- Position: T

Personal information
- Born: May 5, 1923
- Died: June 30, 1984 (aged 61); Levittown, Pennsylvania, U.S.
- Listed height: 6 ft 3 in (1.91 m)
- Listed weight: 235 lb (107 kg)

Career information
- University: Manitoba

Career history
- 1946–1952: Winnipeg Blue Bombers
- 1953: Calgary Stampeders

Allan Passman (May 5, 1923 – June 30, 1984) was a Canadian football player who played for the Winnipeg Blue Bombers and Calgary Stampeders. He played college football the University of Manitoba. He died in 1984 in Pennsylvania.
