= Wax carving =

Wax carving is the shaping of wax using tools usually associated with machining: rotary tools, saws, files and burins or gravers. Actual knives can be used and most certainly are, but the hardness of the material is such that they are not the ideal tool, generally.

To carve wax, the proper size and shape of block or tube is chosen, in the preferred hardness, and cut to a rough size, as needed. Then the design is generally drawn or laid out on that, and saws, files or machine tools are used to work the wax into a finished product. The wax is easily taken to a fine finish in the end using a bit of nylon stocking or steel wool. After the wax product is finished, it may be molded or used in the lost wax casting process to create a final cast product.

== Casting waxes ==
There are a wide variety of wax types used in the lost wax casting process. Generally they fall into three main types, soft, hard and injection waxes. Injection waxes are made and intended to be used for injecting wax under pressure into rubber or other types of molds. They can be carved and worked otherwise, but they are not specifically designed for that use. Their properties more often target good injection properties: flow, low shrinkage, pot life etc.

Soft waxes are sometimes called sculpting waxes, and generally have a consistency resembling clay. Generally the techniques used in working soft waxes are similar to those used with clay and involve the use of wooden or metal spatulas, direct molding with the fingers and the like.

== Carving wax ==
Carving wax is a smooth, non-brittle wax designed for carving and/or machining. Although the formulas for most commercial waxes are proprietary, most suppliers will state that hard waxes are some blend of waxes and plastics. This family of waxes has a hardness and consistency of plastic or softer wood. They can be cut or carved with knives, files and rotary or machine tools. To illustrate the usefulness of this type of wax, if one were to get a candle, mount it on a lathe and feed a tool into it, the wax would slough off like butter, stick to the tool and make a mess. Hard wax, on the other hand, will machine more like soft aluminum, giving fine edges and a fine finish if worked properly.

Waxes come in a wide variety of shapes: blocks, sheets, rods and tubes, and in recent times there are even extruded shapes available. The rods are useful for lathe turning, among other things, and the tubes are useful for making rings in jewelry work. The tubes are available in various sizes, and also with a flat top, which is useful for signet rings.
