= Stonesetting =

Art of attaching gemstones to jewelry

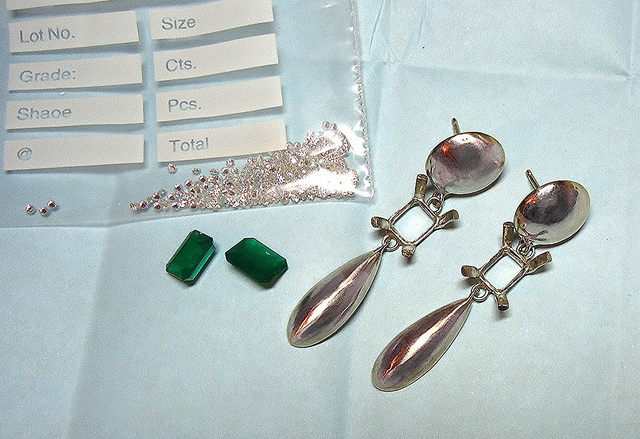
A pair of white gold earrings, ready to be set with emeralds and diamonds.

Stonesetting is the art of securely setting or attaching gemstones into jewelry.

== Cuts ==
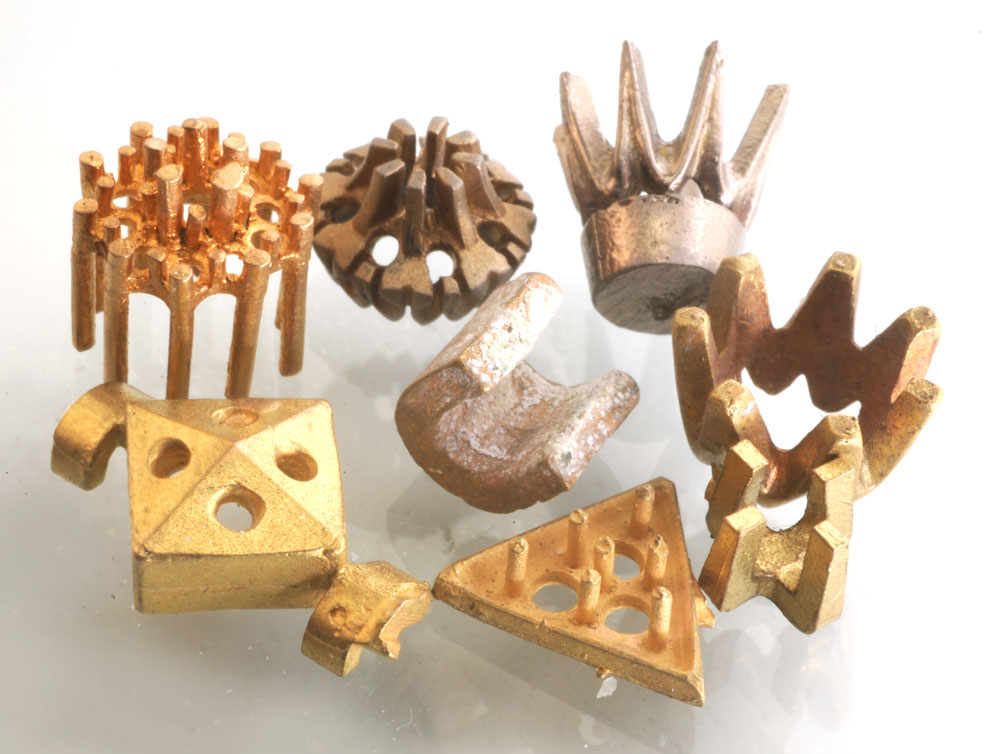
Prefabricated settings for stones, to be attached to jewelry

There are two general types of gemstone cutting: cabochon and facet. Cabochons are smooth, often domed, with flat backs. Agates and turquoise are usually cut this way, but precious stones such as rubies, emeralds and sapphires may also be. Many stones like star sapphires and moonstones must be cut this way in order to properly display their unusual appearance.

A faceted shape resembles that of the modern diamond. It has a flat, polished surface, typically with a transparent surface that refracts light inside the gemstone and reflects light on the outside. In the case of a cabochon stone, the side of the stone is usually cut at a shallow angle, so that when the bezel is pushed over the stone, the angle permits it to hold the stone tightly in place. In the case of faceted stones, a shallow groove is cut into the side of the bezel into which the girdle of the stone is placed, with metal prongs then pushed over the face of the stone, holding it in place; cabochons may also be set into prong settings. In both cases, the pressure and the angle of the prongs holds the stone in place.

Just as the angle of the sides of a cabochon creates the pressure to hold the stone in place, so there is an overlying principle in setting faceted stones. If one looks at a side view of a round diamond, for example, one will see that there is an outer edge, called the girdle, and the top angles up from there, and the bottom angles down from there. Faceted stones are set by "pinching" that angle with metal. All of the styles of faceted stone setting use this concept in one way or another.

== Settings ==
There are thousands of variations of setting styles, but there are several fundamental types:

=== Bezel ===
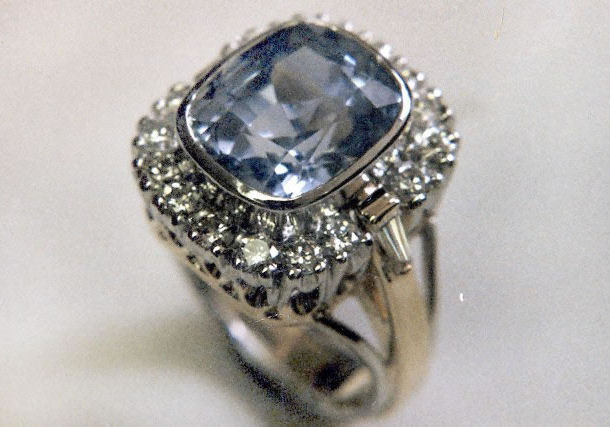
A bezel set sapphire

The earliest known technique of attaching stones to jewelry was bezel setting. A bezel is a strip of metal bent into the shape and size of the stone and then soldered to the piece of jewelry. The stone is then inserted into the bezel, and the metal edge of the bezel pressed over the edge of the stone, holding it in place. This method works well for either cabochons or faceted stones.

=== Prong ===
Prong set diamonds

A prong setting is the simplest and most common type of setting, largely because it uses the least amount of metal to hold the stone in place, displaying most of the stone and forming a secure setting. Generally, a prong setting is formed of a number of short, thin strips of metal, called prongs, which are arranged in a shape and size to hold the given stone, and are fixed at the base. Then a burr of the proper size is used to cut what is known as a "bearing", which is a notch that corresponds to the angles of the stone. The burr most often used is called a "hart bur", and is angled and sized for the job of setting diamonds. The bearing is cut equally into all of the prongs and at the same height above the base. The stone is then inserted, and pliers or a pusher are used to bend the prongs gently over the crown of the stone, with the tops of the prongs are clipped off with snips, filed to an even height above the stone, and finished. Usually a "cup burr" is used to give the prong a nice round tip. A cup burr is in the shape of a hemisphere with teeth on the inside, for making rounded tips on wires and prongs.

There are many variations of prong settings including just two prongs, the more common four prong setting or up to 24 or more, with many variations involving decoration, size and shapes of the prongs themselves, and how they are fixed or used in jewelry. The method of setting is generally the same for all, no matter how many prongs are present.

=== Channel ===
Channel set diamonds

A channel setting is a method whereby stones are suspended between two bars or strips of metal, called channels. Typically, a line of small stones set between two bars is called a channel setting, and a design where the bars cross the stones is called a bar set. The channel is a variation of a "U" shape, with two sides and a bottom. The sides are made slightly narrower than the width of the stone or stones to be set, and then, using the same burs as in prong setting, a small notch, called a bearing, is cut into each wall. The stone is put in place in those notches, and the metal on top is pushed down, tightening the stone in place. The proper way to set a channel is to cut a notch for each stone, but for cheaper production work sometimes a groove is cut along each channel. Since the metal can be very stiff and strong, a reciprocating hammer, similar to a jackhammer but jewelry sized, may be used to hammer down the metal, as it can be difficult to do by hand. The metal is then filed down and finished, and the inner edge near the stones cleaned up and straightened as necessary. As with all jewelry, there can be many variations of channel work. At times the walls will be raised—sometimes a center stone will be set between two bars that rise high from the base ring—or the channel may be cut directly into the surface, making the stones flush with the metal.

=== Bead ===
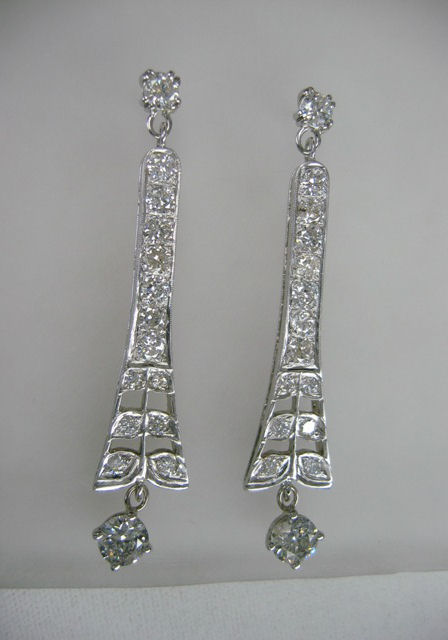
Example of bead set diamonds

Example of pavé set diamonds

"Bead setting" is a generic term for setting a stone directly into metal using gravers, also called burins, which are essentially tiny chisels. A hole is drilled directly into the surface of the metal, before a ball burr is used to make a concave depression the size of the stone. Some setters will set the stone into the concave depression, and some will use a hart burr to cut a bearing around the edge. The stone is then inserted into the space, and gravers or burins are used to lift and push a tiny bit of the metal into and over the edge of the stone. Then a beading tool – a simple steel shaft with a concave dimple cut into the tip – is pushed onto the bit of metal, rounding and smoothing it, pushing it firmly onto the stone, and creating a "bead".

There are many types of setting that use the bead setting technique. When many stones are set closely together in this fashion, roughly 1 millimetre (0.039 in) apart, covering a surface, this is known as a "pavé" setting, from the French for "paved" or "cobblestoned". When a long line is engraved into the metal going up to each of the beads, this is known as a "star setting". The other common usage of this setting is known as "bead and bright", "grain setting" or "threading" in Europe, alongside many other names. This is when, after the stone is set as described above, the background metal around the stone is cut away, usually in geometric shapes, resulting in the stone being left with four beads in a lowered box shape with an edge around it. Often it is a row of stones, so it will be in a long shape with a raised edge and a row of stones and beads down the center. This type of setting is still used often, but it was very common in the early- to mid-20th century.

=== Burnish ===
Burnish set diamonds

Burnish setting, also sometimes referred to as flush setting, shot setting, or gypsy setting, is similar to bead setting, but after the stone is inserted into the space, instead of using a graver to lift beads, a burnishing tool is used to push the metal around the stone. The stone will be roughly flush with the surface, with a burnished or rubbed edge around it. This type of setting has a long history, and has seen a resurgence in contemporary jewelry. Sometimes the metal is finished using sandblasting.
