= Annie Coleman Homes =

Public housing complex in Miami, Florida

- Interactive map of Annie Coleman Homes

General information
- Location: Brownsville, Miami, Florida
- Coordinates: 25.82313°N 80.23164°W
- Status: Closed
- No. of units: 245

Construction
- Constructed: 1965-1967

Other information
- Governing body: Miami-Dade Public Housing Agency

The Annie Coleman Homes is a public housing complex in the Brownsville neighborhood of Miami, Florida, US, named after civil rights pioneer, Annie M. Coleman Built starting in the early 1960s and constructed in 1965, it is bordered by NW 54th Street to the north, NW 46th Street to the south, NW 27th Avenue to the west and NW 21st Avenue to the east.
