= Brownsville =

Brownsville may refer to various places in:

== Australia ==
- Brownsville, New South Wales, a suburb of Wollongong, New South Wales

== Canada ==
- Brownsville, British Columbia
- Brownsville, Nova Scotia
- Brownsville, Durham Region, Ontario
- Brownsville, Oxford County, Ontario
- Brownsville Station, Ontario
- The original name of Schomberg, Ontario
- An early settlement of Woodbridge, Ontario, founded between 1802 and 1837, now subsumed by Woodbridge

== United States ==
- Brownsville, Alabama, unincorporated community in Clay County
- Brownsville, California (disambiguation), the name of several places
- Brownsville, Delaware
- Brownsville, Florida
  - Brownsville (Metrorail station), located at the above location
- Brownsville, Escambia County, Florida
- Brownsville, the original name of the South Atlanta neighborhood of Atlanta, Georgia
- Brownsville, Georgia, an unincorporated community in Paulding County
- Brownsville (ghost town), Illinois, ghost town in Jackson County, Illinois
- Brownsville, White County, Illinois, unincorporated community in White County, Illinois
- Brownsville, Indiana
  - Brownsville Township, Union County, Indiana
- Brownsville, Kentucky
- Brownsville-Bawcomville, Louisiana
- Brownsville, Maryland
- Brownsville, Minnesota
  - Brownsville Township, Houston County, Minnesota
- Brownsville, Mississippi, in Hinds County, Mississippi
- Brownsville, Brooklyn, New York
- Brownsville, Ohio
- Brownsville, Oregon
- Brownsville, Pennsylvania
  - Brownsville, Berks County, Pennsylvania
  - Brownsville Township, Fayette County, Pennsylvania
- Brownsville, South Dakota
- Brownsville, Tennessee
- Brownsville, Texas, largest population among cities with this name
- Brownsville, Vermont
- Brownsville (Nassawadox, Virginia), a historic house
- Brownsville, Washington
- Brownsville, West Virginia
- Brownsville, Wisconsin

== See also ==
- Brownsville affair
- Brownville (disambiguation)
- "Brownsville Girl" (1986 song)
