= Annie Coleman =

American civil rights activist

- Born: Annie Lou Manning; September 19, 1894; Quitman County, Georgia, U.S.
- Died: August 19, 1981 (aged 86); Miami, Florida, U.S.
- Burial place: Lincoln Memorial Park, Miami, Florida
- Monuments: Annie Coleman Homes
- Education: Paine College
- Occupation: Civil rights activist
- Years active: 1923-1977
- Organization(s): Colored Town Civic League, National Urban League, National Organization for Women
- Title: Chairwoman
- Political party: Freedom Democratic Party
- Movement: social, political
- Board member of: Dorsey Memorial Library Board of Trustees, Miami Negro Civic Organizian Board
- Spouse: Rev James E. Coleman
- Children: 3
- Awards: Inductee of the National Women's Hall of Fame
- Honours: National Freedom Award

Annie Manning Coleman (born September 19, 1894 - August 19, 1981) was an American voting civil rights activist and community organizer. She organized and served as the chairwoman of the Colored Town Civic League. She was also the co-founder of the Dunbar Library recognized as Miami's first library established to serve the African American community.

Coleman began her civil rights activism in 1923, she became a charter member of an organization called the Negro Woman's Club. In addition to her work as a teacher, music instructor and secretary, Coleman wanted to make a positive impact on her community through civic engagement. She continued to make an impact in Overtown with her formation of the Colored Town (Overtown) Civic League, where she promoted public order within the neighborhood, public schools and giving black residents an organized voice. She also proceeded to form the Friendship Garden Club which was a mission club to clean-up and beautify the grounds of Booker T. Washington High School, Dunbar High School, as well as other grounds within the neighborhood.

She helped and encouraged thousands of Black people in Florida to become registered voters, and assisted hundreds of disenfranchised people in her area through work in programs such as Freedom Farm Cooperative. She served as the secretary of the Christian Hospital, which was a segregated black hospital.

== Early life, family and education ==
Annie Coleman was born, Annie Lou Manning on September 19, 1894, in Quitman County, Georgia. She was the first born to Henry Manning (railroad worker) and Bertha Manning (cook). She was primarily raised by her maternal grandmother, Dicey, whom was a former slave. Annie Manning graduated from high school at the Spelman Seminary in Atlanta, Georgia, and earned a teaching certificate at the Paine College. After high school, she attended Paine College and graduated in 1916 with a bachelor's degree in education.
