= Gentrification of Miami =

The gentrification of Miami is the process taking place in which Miami is transitioning to appeal to a more typical, middle and upper-class taste. This occurred in the same way most cities are gentrified, by cleaning up the neighborhood, rebuilding cultural monuments and parks, and encouraging artists to engage in business there, with the promise of consumers to buy their wares.

The gentrification of Miami was driven by wealthy South American investors. Miami became a multicultural city, due in great part to promotion by the entertainment industry. Latino celebrities are notorious for their eye-catching "Miami lifestyle". The lives of most immigrants are far from glamorous or celebrated. Non-white immigrants—specifically African descendants—continue to experience difficulty finding employment and risk displacement by the city's growth and development.

== History ==
As recently as the 1970s, South Beach was mostly deserted, aside from retirees. Art Deco buildings built in the 1920s and 1930s had mostly deteriorated. The primary commerce available was minimal and catered to retirees. From 1965 to 1973, an estimate of 300,000 Cubans were transported to Miami seeking refugee in what is known as the Freedom Flights. In 1980, the Mariel boatlift brought 125,000 Cuban immigrants. This influx of immigrants brought significant change to Miami. Some of these immigrants had been released by Fidel Castro from mental hospitals and prisons. Many were regular citizens fleeing political persecution. The mass influx of immigrants overwhelmed South Beach. The area did not have the infrastructure to house them and the city degenerated into slum and blight. In 1981, the Miami Beach Community Development Corporation devised a plan to revamp the city, exploiting its tropical climate, beaches and available workers in the area.

== Neighborhoods ==
=== West Coconut Grove ===
Bahamians were some of the first settlers in Coconut Grove before it was annexed by the city. They began settling in the 1800s, many immigrating from Key West in pursuit of jobs and sustained their heritage and culture there. The original Bahamian settlement grew to incorporate African American settlers in the 1920s. At that time, the area was segregated to split it from nearby Coral Gables. These settlers constructed the first black church, cemetery and library, which survive. The community has remained cohesive through continued efforts to separate it from the rest of Coconut Grove and Coral Gables, including the West Grove trolley garage. The community resisted city zoning and redevelopment that would have adversely impacted their community via historic district and neighborhood conservation district classifications. The Miami 21 Zoning Code refers to the West Grove as being “of special and substantial interest due to the unique Caribbean and Bahamian character and heritage”. Nevertheless, some politicians and developers circumvent these regulations. Community Benefits Agreements allowed developers to engage directly with the community, attempting to expedite gentrification.

=== Little Haiti ===
Haitians began arriving in Miami in the 1960s, peaking at 25,000 refugees in 1980. Many Haitians were sent back to Haiti, lacking the favorable status granted to Cuban immigrants. Using the Cuban/Haitian immigration disparity to unite Haitians, Viter Juste, Pulitzer Prize-winning photographer for the Miami Herald, coined the phrase “Little Haiti”. Gentrification in Wynwood and the Miami Design District is spilling over into Little Haiti and displacing Haitians. Haitian communities are some of the poorest in Miami-Dade County, and the relocation of wealthy residents to other areas has not helped their plight. Their Haitian Creole language increases isolation from the outside world. The social cohesion of language and culture in the community intensifies the disruptive effects of gentrification. One 2017 study predicted that Little Haiti would gentrify more rapidly than any other neighborhood in South Florida. Community leaders aim to target this problem by encouraging and assisting home ownership by locals.

=== Overtown ===
Overtown was established as the central African-American neighborhood in segregated Miami during the Jim Crow era. Originally labeled “Colored Town”, it soon grew to incorporate immigrants from the Caribbean, such as Barbados and Trinidad and Tobago. These immigrants established some of the first Black-owned businesses in South Florida. By the 1960s, it had a thriving musical culture and became known as “The Harlem of the South”, catering to artists such as B. B. King and Aretha Franklin. The construction of the I-95 in the 1960s was a major contributing factor in the decline of Overtown. The highway divided the community into four quadrants that complicated efforts by community developers to unify it. Due to the destruction of homes and businesses, from 1960 to 1970 the population decreased by 50%. Efforts to improve the neighborhood include renovations of the Lyric Theater and the Miami Greenway River Action Plan of 2001.
