= Brownville =

Brownville can refer to a community in the United States:

- Brownville, Maine
- Brownville, Nebraska
- Brownville, New Jersey
- Brownville (town), New York
  - Brownville (village), New York
- Brownville, Wisconsin

== See also ==
- Brownsville (disambiguation)
