= Overtown (Miami) =

Overtown Central Negro District (historic)
- Neighborhood of Miami
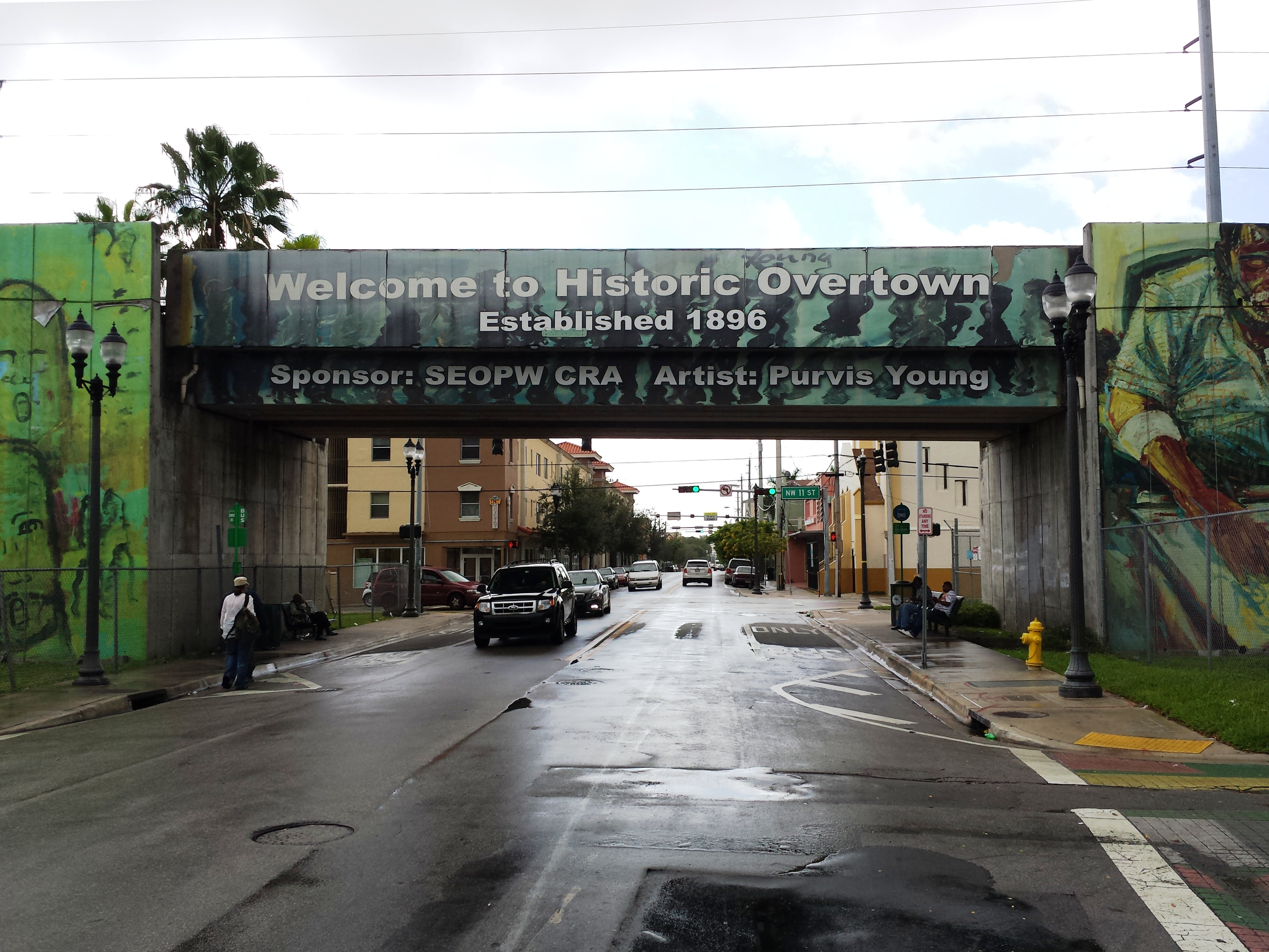
- NW 3rd Avenue
- Nickname: Colored Town (historic name)
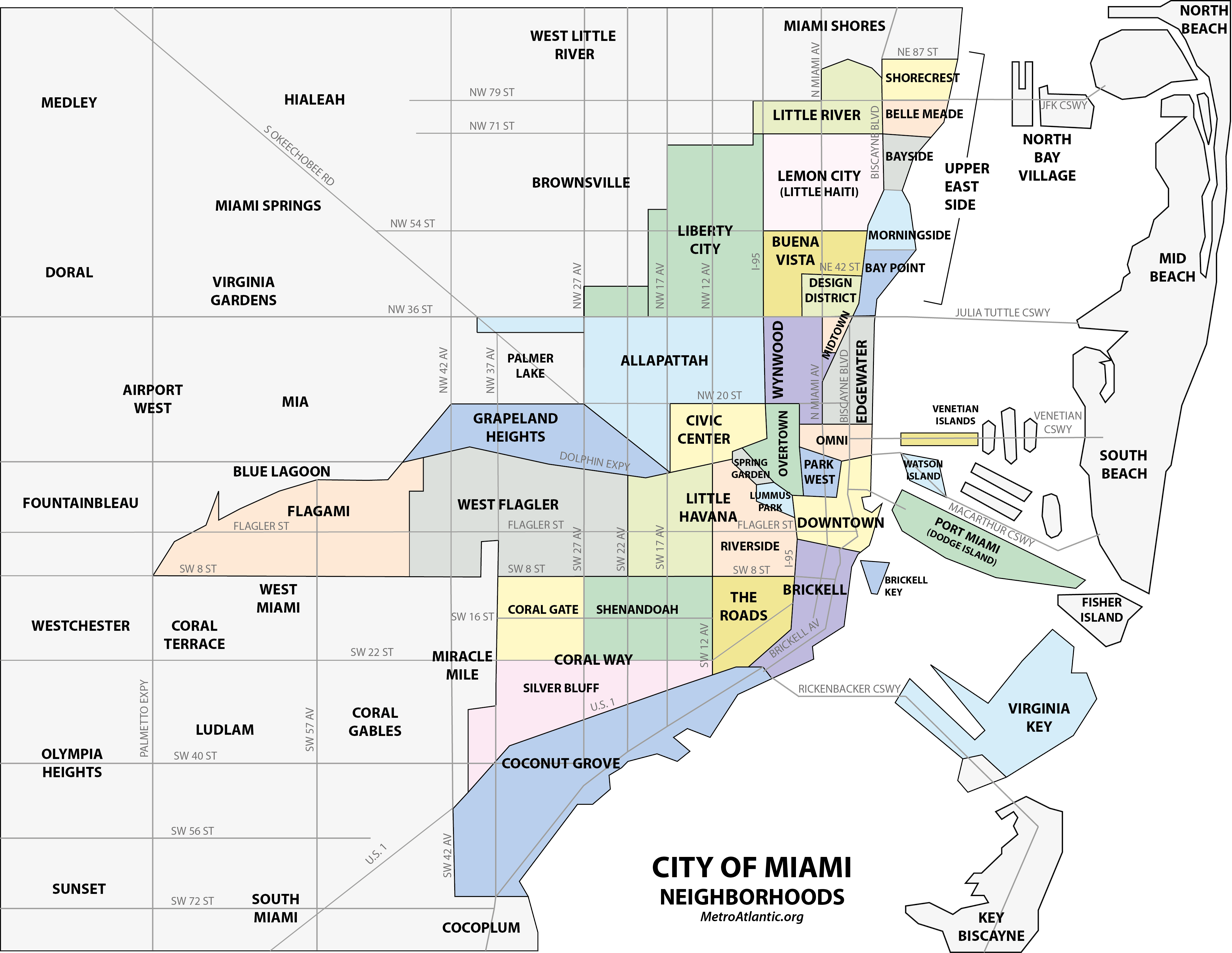
- Overtown neighborhood within the City of Miami
- Coordinates: 25°47′14.92″N 80°12′2.32″W
- Country: United States
- State: Florida
- County: Miami-Dade County
- City: Miami

Government
  - City of Miami Commissioner: Keon Hardemon
  - Miami-Dade Commissioners: Audrey Edmonson
  - House of Representatives: Cynthia Stafford (D)
  - State Senate: Larcenia Bullard (D)
  - U.S. House: Frederica Wilson (D)

Population (2010)
  - Total: 6,736
  - Density: 8,820/sq mi (3,410/km^{2})
  - Demonym: Towner
- Time zone: UTC-05 (EST)
- ZIP Code: 33136
- Area codes: 305, 786

Overtown is a historic neighborhood of Miami, Florida, United States, just northwest of Downtown Miami. It is bound by NW 20th Street to the north, NW 5th Street to the south, the Miami River, Dolphin Expressway (SR 836), and I-95 (north of the Midtown Interchange) to the west, and the Florida East Coast Railway (FEC) and NW 1st Avenue to the east. Originally called Colored Town in the Jim Crow era of the late 19th through the mid-20th century, the area was once the preeminent and is the historic center for commerce in the black community in Miami and South Florida. The Overtown Historic Folklife Village is in the area. Local residents often go by the demonym "Towners".

Overtown has been a core cultural, intellectual and economic hub for African American life in Miami since the Great Migration. Originally known as “Colored Town”, the neighborhood developed into a thriving Black community where African American from the Southern United States and Black immigrants from the Caribbean establish homes, businesses, churches, and institutions. During the early and mid-20th century, Overtown became a center of Black entrepreneurs, entertainment, education and political activism.

However, during the 1960s, Overtown experienced a drastic transformation and began a significant decline. The construction of Interstate 95, expressways and urban renewal projects resulted in the demolition of thousands of homes and businesses. These developments severely disrupted the neighborhood’s economic foundation and contributed to population loss, unemployment and increasing property. Over the following decades, Overtown experienced rising crime rates, deteriorating housing conditions and economic disinvestment, eventually becoming one of Miami’s most dangerous and crime-ridden inner-city neighborhoods.

== History ==
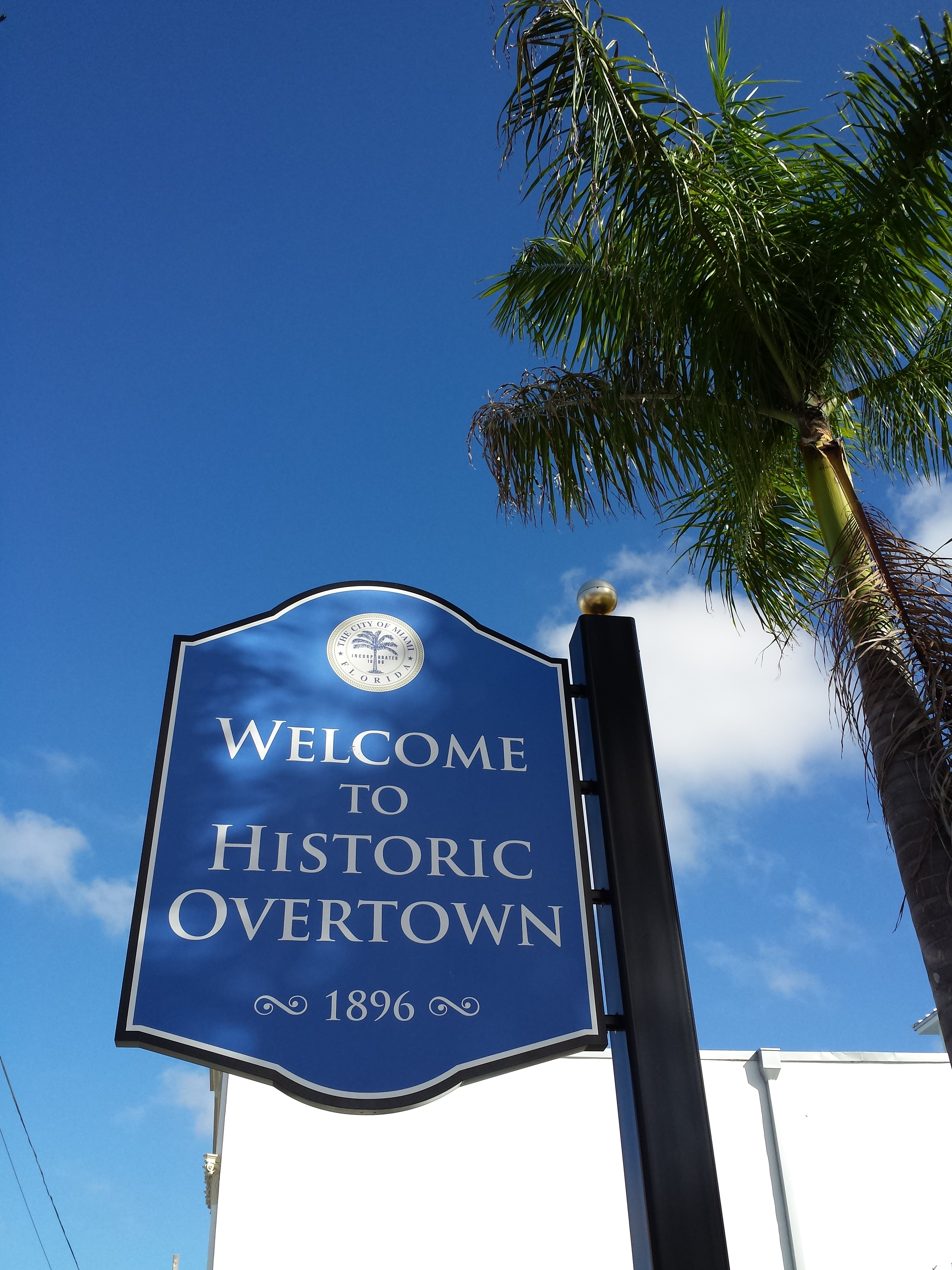
Overtown Folklife Village sign on the NW 2nd Avenue

A part of the historic heart of Miami, it was designated as a "colored" neighborhood after the creation and incorporation of Miami in 1896. The incorporation of Miami as a city occurred at the insistence of Standard Oil and FEC railroad tycoon Henry Flagler, whose mostly black American railroad construction workers settled near what became Downtown Miami, just north of Flagler's Royal Palm Hotel on the Miami River. Owing to a substantive black population, 168 of the 362 men who voted for the creation of the city of Miami were counted as "colored," but the separate but equal segregation laws of the Deep South dictated the city designate the portion of the city, in this case, north and west of FEC railroad tracks, as "Colored Town."

The second-oldest continuously inhabited neighborhood of the Miami area after Coconut Grove, the area thrived as a center for commerce, primarily along Northwest Second Avenue. Home to the Lyric Theatre (completed in 1913) and other businesses, West Second Avenue served as the main street of the black community during an era which, up until the Civil Rights Act of 1964, barred black residents from entering middle and upper income white areas like Miami Beach and Coral Gables without "passes." During the Florida land boom of the 1920s, Overtown was home to one of the first black millionaires in the American South, D. A. Dorsey (who once owned Fisher Island), and the original Booker T. Washington High School, then the first high school educating black students south of Palm Beach. Community organizing and mobilization during the era, as such in actions of Reverend John Culmer, who advocated for better living conditions for lower class blacks living in abject squalor during the 1920s, led to the completion of Liberty Square in 1937 in what is now-called Liberty City. Northwest Second Avenue and the surrounding neighborhood, once-called the "Little Broadway" of the South, by the 1940s hosted hundreds of mostly black-owned businesses, ranging from libraries and social organizations to a hospital and popular nightclubs.

Popular with blacks and whites alike, Overtown was a center for nightly entertainment in Miami, comparable to Miami Beach, at its height post-World War II in the 1940s and 1950s. The area served as a place of rest and refuge for black mainstream entertainers such as Count Basie, Ella Fitzgerald, Cab Calloway, Josephine Baker, Billie Holiday, and Nat King Cole who were not allowed to lodge at prominent venues where they performed like the Fontainebleau and the Eden Roc, where Overtown hotels like the Mary Elizabeth Hotel furnished to their needs. Further, many prominent black luminaries like W. E. B. Du Bois, Zora Neale Hurston, Joe Louis and Jackie Robinson lodged and entertained in the neighborhood.

The area experienced serious economic decline from the late 1950s. Issues ranging from urban renewal to the construction of interstate highways like I-95 (then, the North-South Expressway), the Dolphin Expressway and the Midtown Interchange in the 1960s, fragmented the once-thriving center with the resident population decimated by nearly 80 percent from roughly 50,000 to just over 10,000. The area became economically destitute and considered a "ghetto" as businesses closed and productivity stagnated in the neighborhood. In 1982, a riot broke out in the neighborhood following the police shooting of a man.

Development was spurred in the area again in the late 1980s with the construction and completion of the Miami Arena and transit-oriented development surrounding the newly opened Overtown station.

Since the 1990s and 2000s, community gardens have been created, in addition to renovations to the historic Lyric Theatre and revitalization and gentrification efforts spurred both by the city of Miami and Miami-Dade County. Marvin Dunn founded the original Roots in the City Overtown Community Garden, turning an "overgrown, littered lot into a flourishing garden" maintained by Overtown residents and volunteers. Roots in the City, a non-profit "dedicated to community development, jobs training, inner-city beautification, healthy eating initiatives, and community research" used the Community Gardens to provide affordable fresh produce to low-income families, public school students, community agencies and homeless shelters; and it also organizes an urban farmer's market. These projects and other aspects of Overtown were featured in a short documentary The Ground under Overtown centered on multi-issue multi-racial community organizing created around Florida protests against the FTAA with a focus on environmental racism, critiques of so-called "free trade" agreements like the FTAA, and positive community solutions such as permaculture. Anti-FTAA protesters at Dr. Dunn's invitation held a workshop on permaculture at the Overtown Community Garden and donated over 100 cherry trees to the Overtown community.

In 2015, David Beckham announced that he had secured land in the neighborhood for a future, since-named Major League Soccer expansion franchise in Miami, although the team has since proposed a stadium at a different site in the city.

== Demographics ==
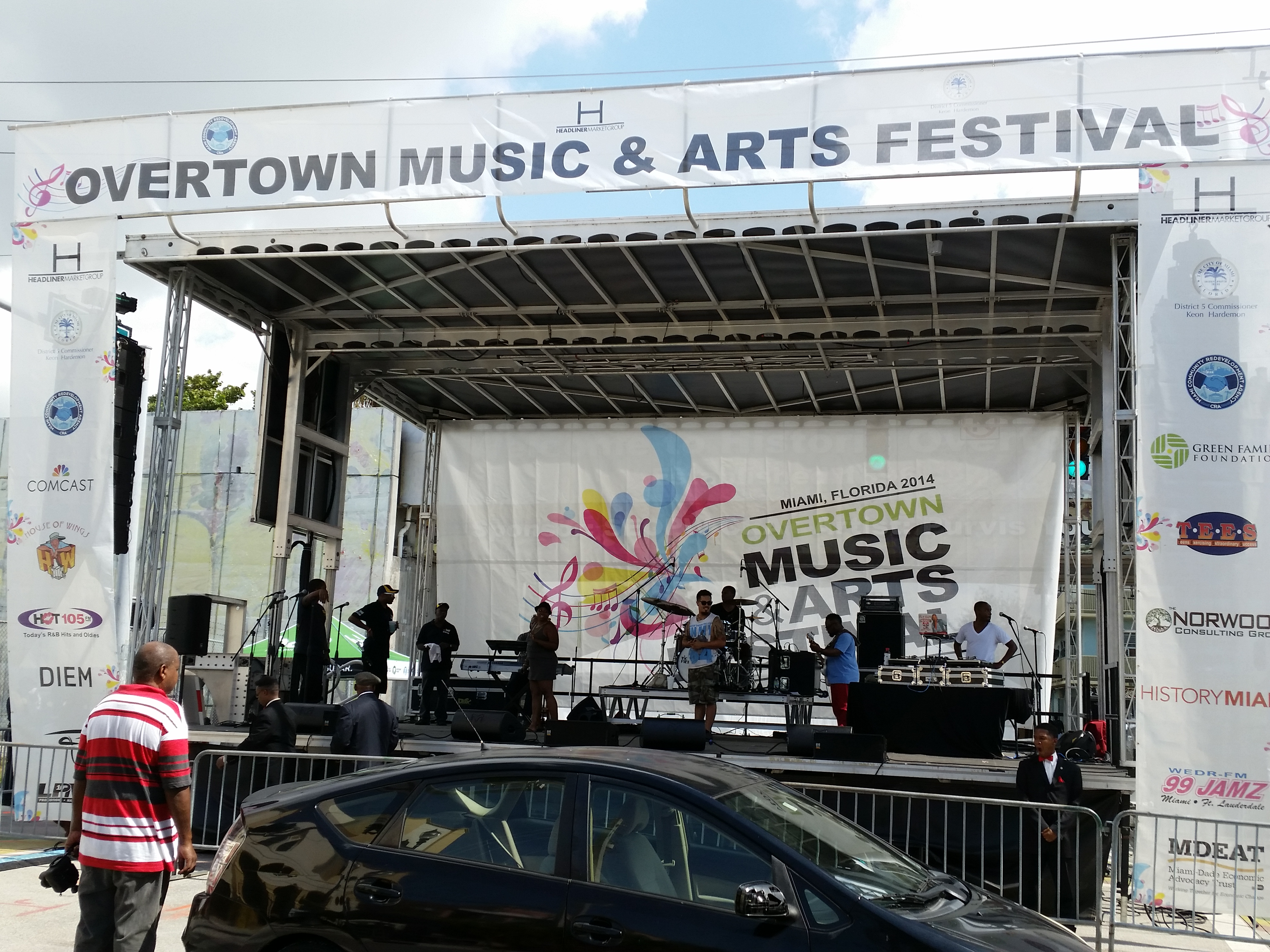
Overtown Music and Arts Festival

As of 2000, Overtown had a population of 10,029 residents, with 3,646 households, and 2,128 families residing in the city. The median household income was $13,211.99. The racial makeup of the neighborhood was 74.77% Black, 19.90% Hispanic or Latino of any race, 3.27% White (non-Hispanic), and 2.05% Other races (non-Hispanic).

== Places of interest ==
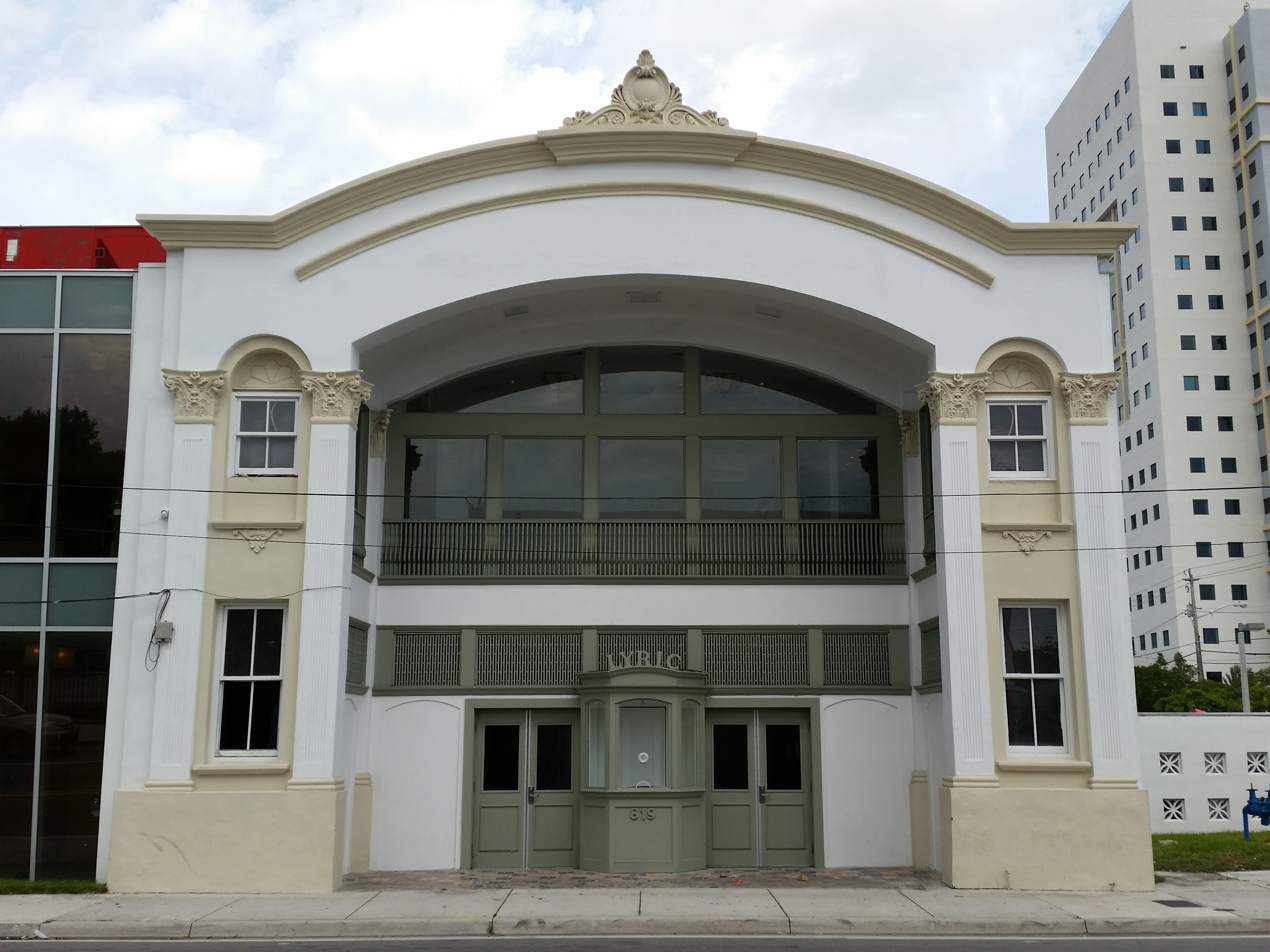
Lyric Theater, 1914

Overtown is home to several historic churches and landmarks listed in the National Register of Historic Places, including:

- Dana Albert Dorsey House (250 NW 9th Street): built in 1913, was home to Dana Albert Dorsey, one of Miami's most prominent black businessmen and philanthropists;
- Greater Bethel African Methodist Episcopal Church (245 NW 8th Street): built from 1927 to 1943, was the home of one of Miami's oldest black congregations;
- Lyric Theater (819 NW 2nd Ave): built in 1914, was a focal point of social life of the black community;
- Mt. Zion Baptist Church (301 NW 9th Street): built from 1928 to 1941, was the church of one of Miami's oldest congregations;
- St. John's Baptist Church (1328 NW 3rd Avenue): built in 1940, is an example of Art Deco style religious buildings in Miami-Dade County.

Other places of interest included in the City of Miami Historic Preservation Program are:

- Dorsey Memorial Library (100 NW 17th Street): built in 1941, was the first city-owned building constructed specifically as a library;
- Dr. William A. Chapman House (526 NW 13th Street): built in 1923, was home of Miami's first black physicians;
- Ebenezer Methodist Church (1042 NW 3rd Avenue): built in 1948, is an example of Gothic Revival design;
- Hindu Temple (870 NW 11th Street): built in 1920 inspired to the sets of the film The Jungle Trial, was home to the merchant John Seybold;
- St. Agnes' Episcopal Church (1750 NW 3rd Avenue): built from 1923 to 1930 to house one of Miami's oldest black congregations;
- Ward Rooming House (249 NW 9th Street): built in 1925, is a gallery and visitor center;
- X-Ray Clinic (171 NW 11th Street): built in 1939 as office for South Florida's first black radiologist Dr. Samuel H. Johnson.

== Parks and recreation ==
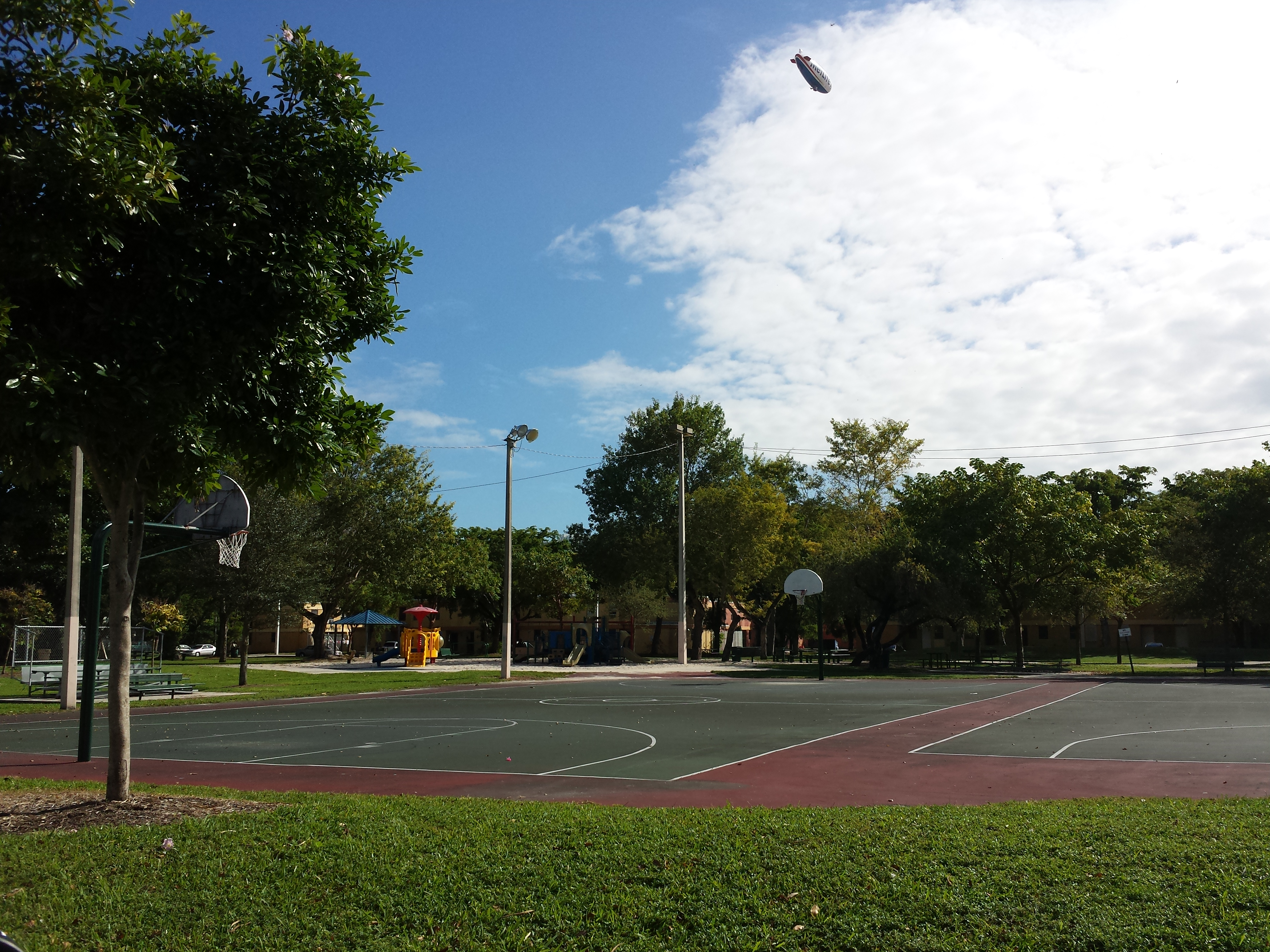
Henry Reeves Park

- Ninth Street Pedestrian Mall, NW 9th Street - NW 2nd Avenue;
- Dorsey Park, 1701 NW 1st Ave;
- Gibson Park, 401 NW 12th St;
- Henry Reeves Park, 600 NW 10th St;
- Spring Garden Point Park, 601 NW 7th Street Rd;
- Town Park, NW 17th Street - NW 5th Avenue;
- Williams Park, 1717 NW 5th Ave.

== Education and institutions ==
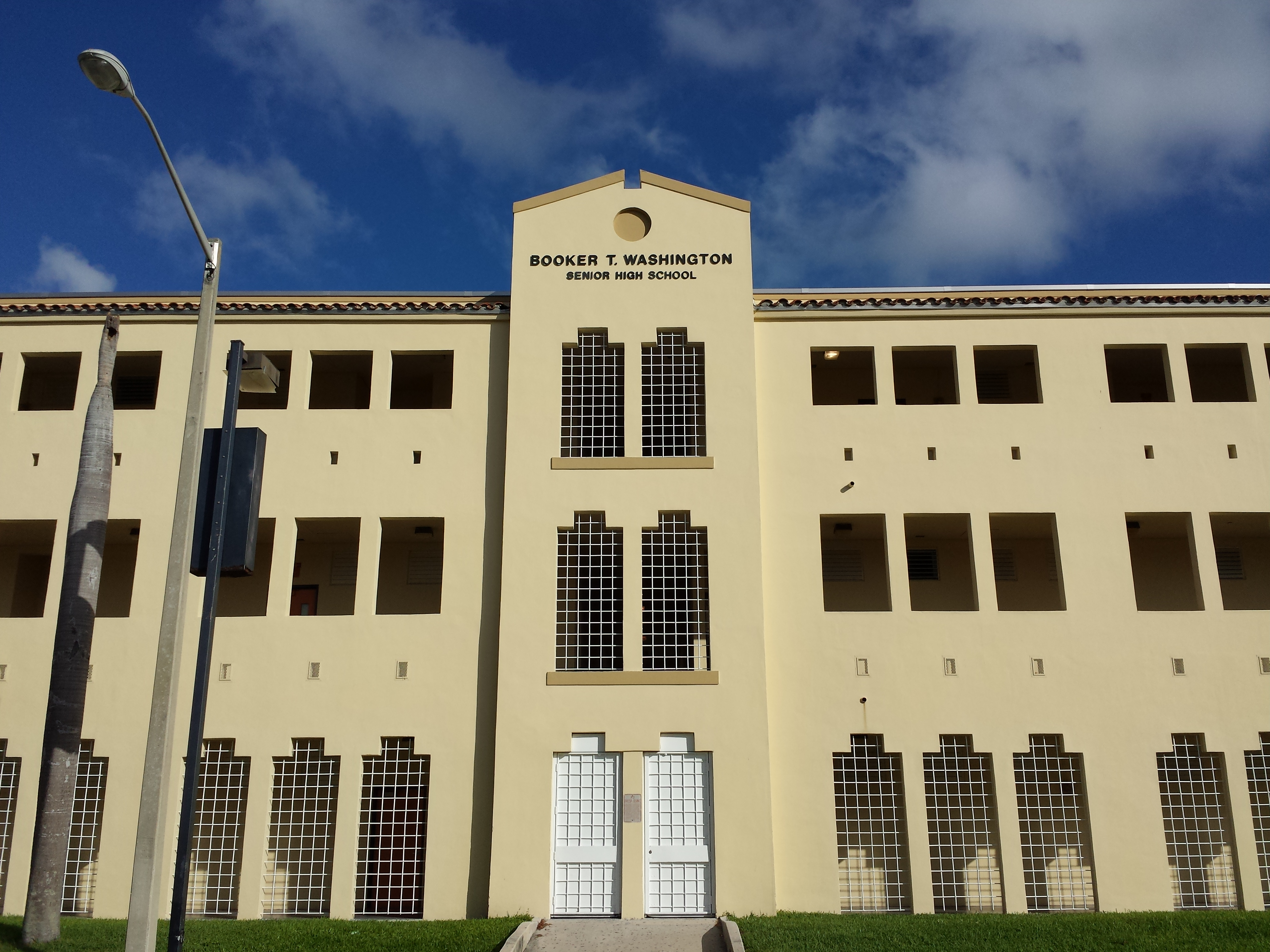
Booker T. Washington High School

=== Schools ===
Miami-Dade County Public Schools:

- Frederick Douglass Elementary School, 314 NW 12th St;
- Dunbar Elementary School - 505 NW 20th St, Miami, FL 33127
- Paul Laurence Dunbar K-8, 505 NW 20th St;
- Phillis Wheatley Elementary School, 1801 NW 1st Pl;
- Booker T. Washington Senior High School, 1200 NW 6th Ave;
- Theodore R. and Thelma A. Gibson Charter School, 1682 NW 4th Ave.

=== Libraries ===
- Overtown Public Library (350 NW 13th St), with its exterior walls adorned with paintings by Overtown's famous urban expressionist painter, Purvis Young.
- Dorsey Memorial Library (100 NW 17th St) (1941–1961), Dorsey Memorial Library was the first city-owned building constructed specifically for library purposes.

=== Museums ===
- Black Police Precinct & Courthouse Museum, 480 NW 11th St.

=== Places of worship ===
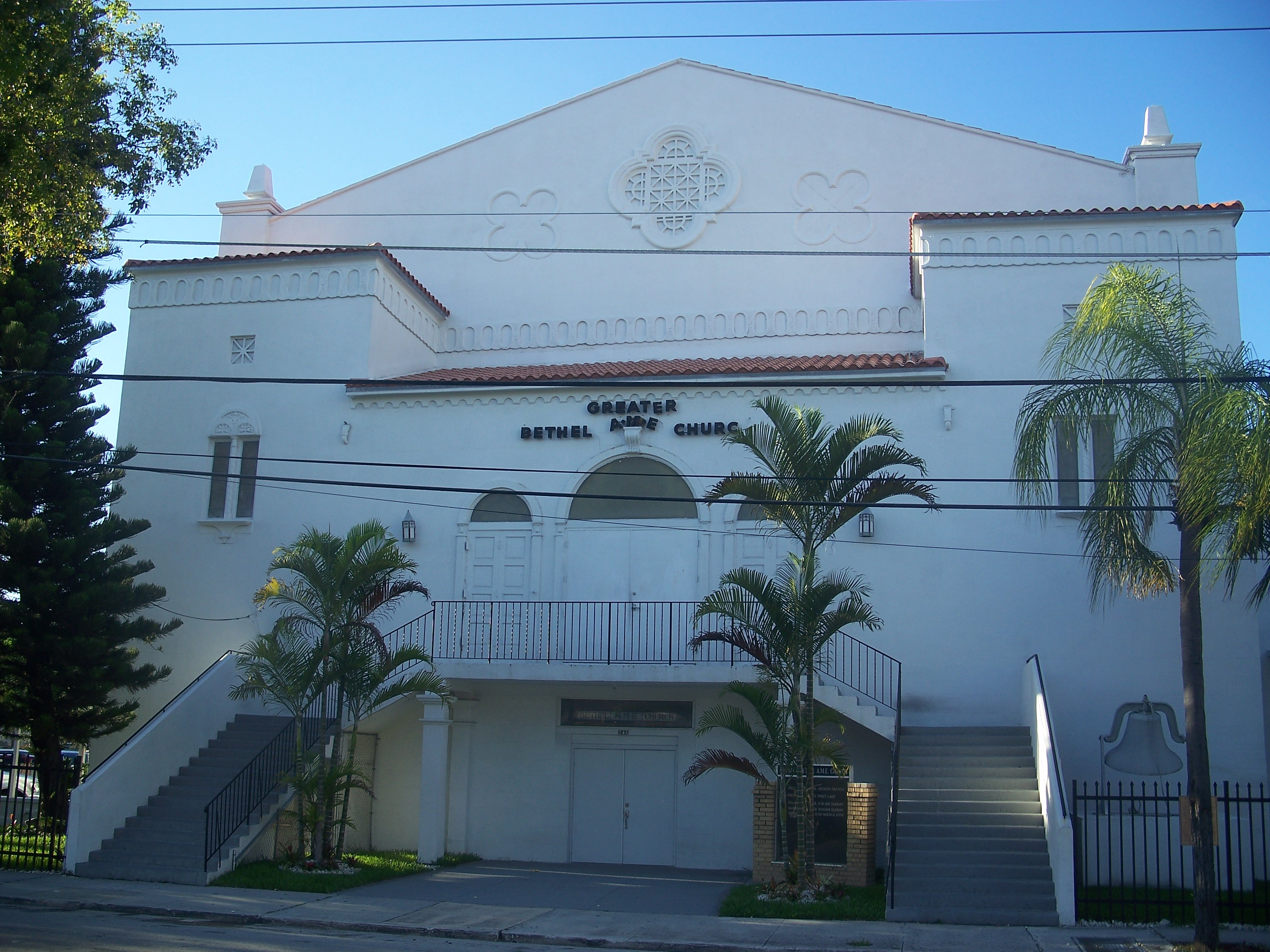
Greater Bethel AME Church, 1927

In addition to the churches listed in the places of interest section, in the neighborhood there are:

- A.M. Cohen Temple Church of God in Christ, 1747 NW 3rd Ave
- Christ Church of The Living God, 225 NW 14th Ter
- Greater Israel Bethel Primitive Baptist Church, 160 NW 18th St
- Greater Mercy Missionary Baptist Church, 1135 NW 3rd Ave
- Mt. Olivette Baptist Church, 1450 NW 1st Ct
- New Hope Primitive Baptist Church, 1301 NW 1st Pl
- Saint Peter's Antiochian Orthodox Catholic Church, 1811 NW 4th Ct
- St. Francis Xavier Catholic Church, 1682 NW 4th Ave
- Temple Baptist Church, 1723 NW 3rd Ave
- Triumph The Church and Kingdom of God in Christ, 1752 NW 1st Ct

=== Other institutions ===
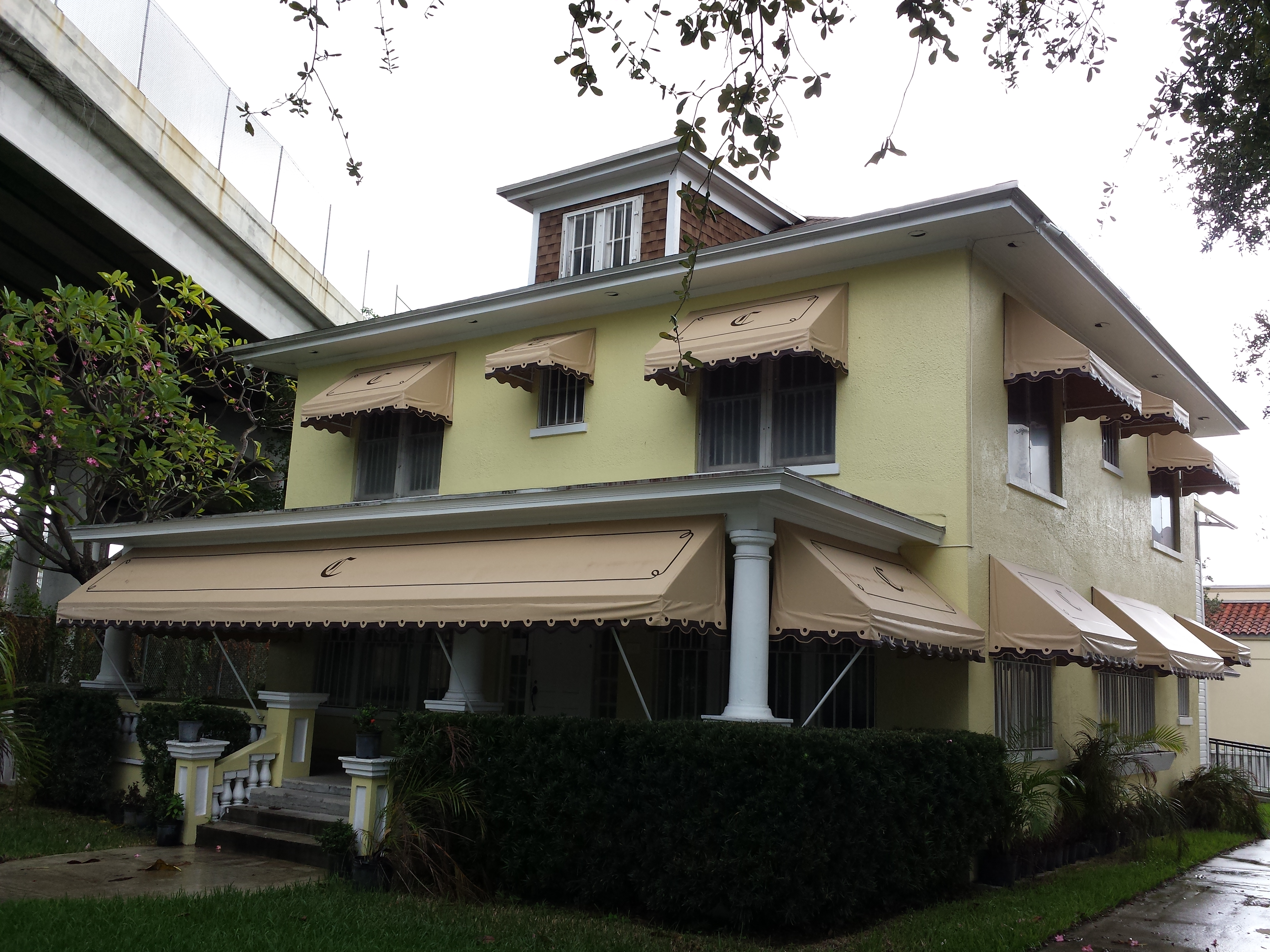
Dr. William A. Chapman House

- Miami-Dade County - Culmer Neighborhood Service Center, 1600 NW 3rd Ave;
- City of Miami - Overtown Neighborhood Enhancement Team, 1490 NW 3rd Ave Suite 112-B;
- Southeast Overtown/Park West Community Redevelopment Agency, 1490 NW 3rd Ave Ste 105;
- Overtown Youth Center, 450 NW 14th St NW 3rd Ave.

== Infrastructure ==
=== Transportation ===
Overtown is served by the Miami Metrorail at:

- Historic Overtown/Lyric Theatre (NW Eighth Street and First Avenue)
- Culmer (NW 11th Street and US 441)

=== Health care ===
- Jefferson Reaves Sr. Health Center, 1009 NW 5th Ave NW 10th Street.

== Gallery ==
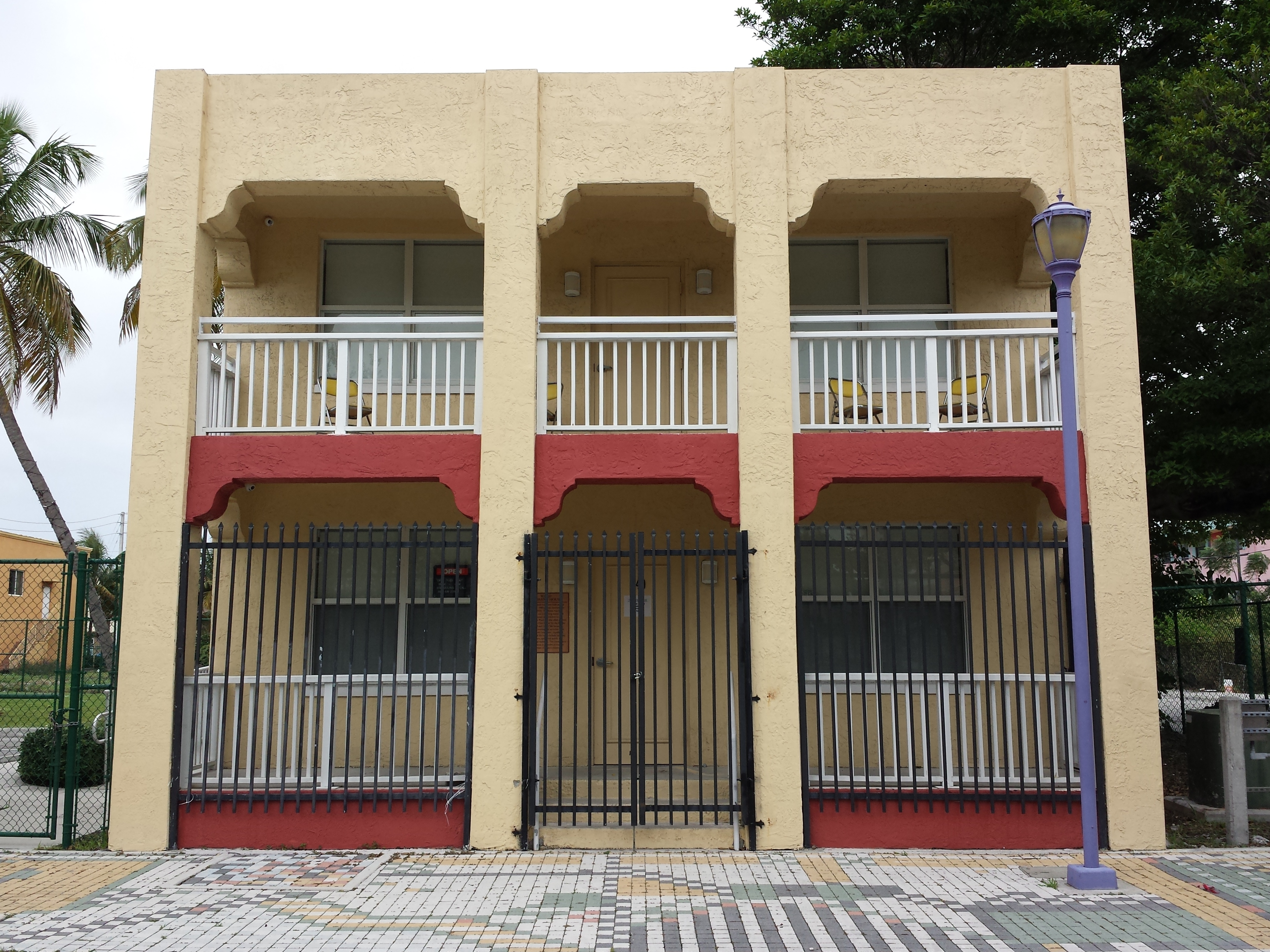
Ward Rooming House

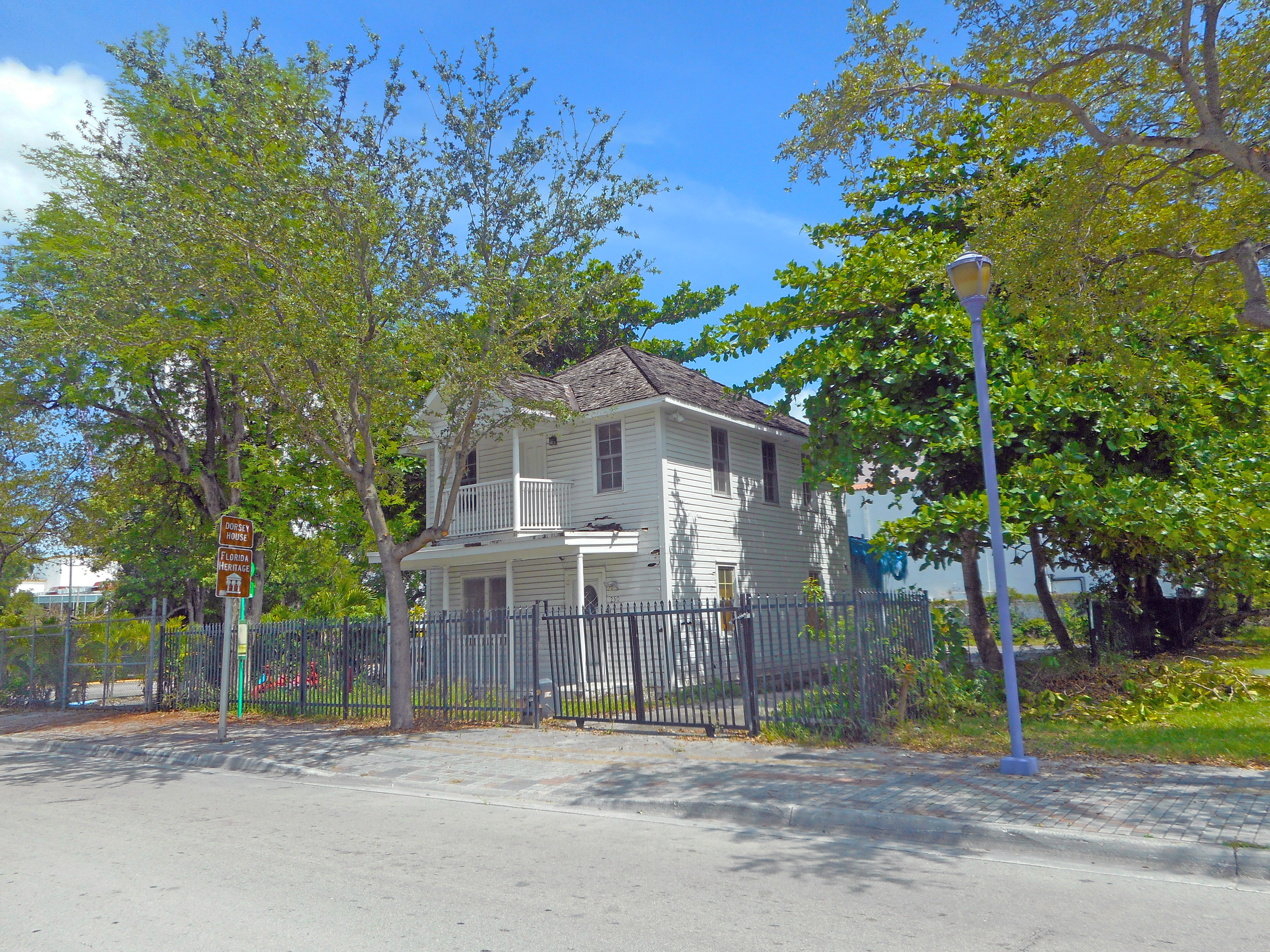
D.A. Dorsey House, built in 1914

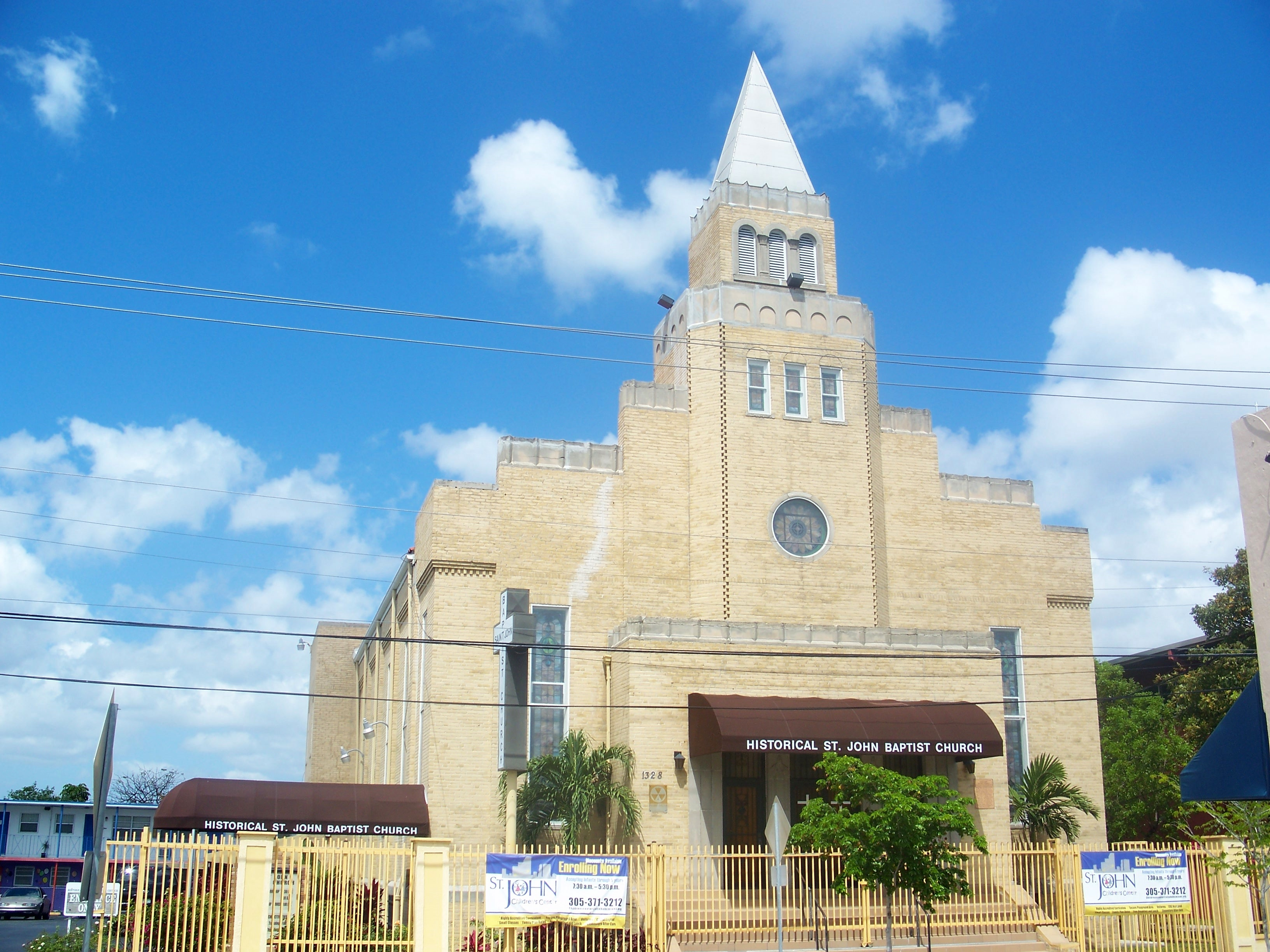
St. John's Baptist Church, 1940

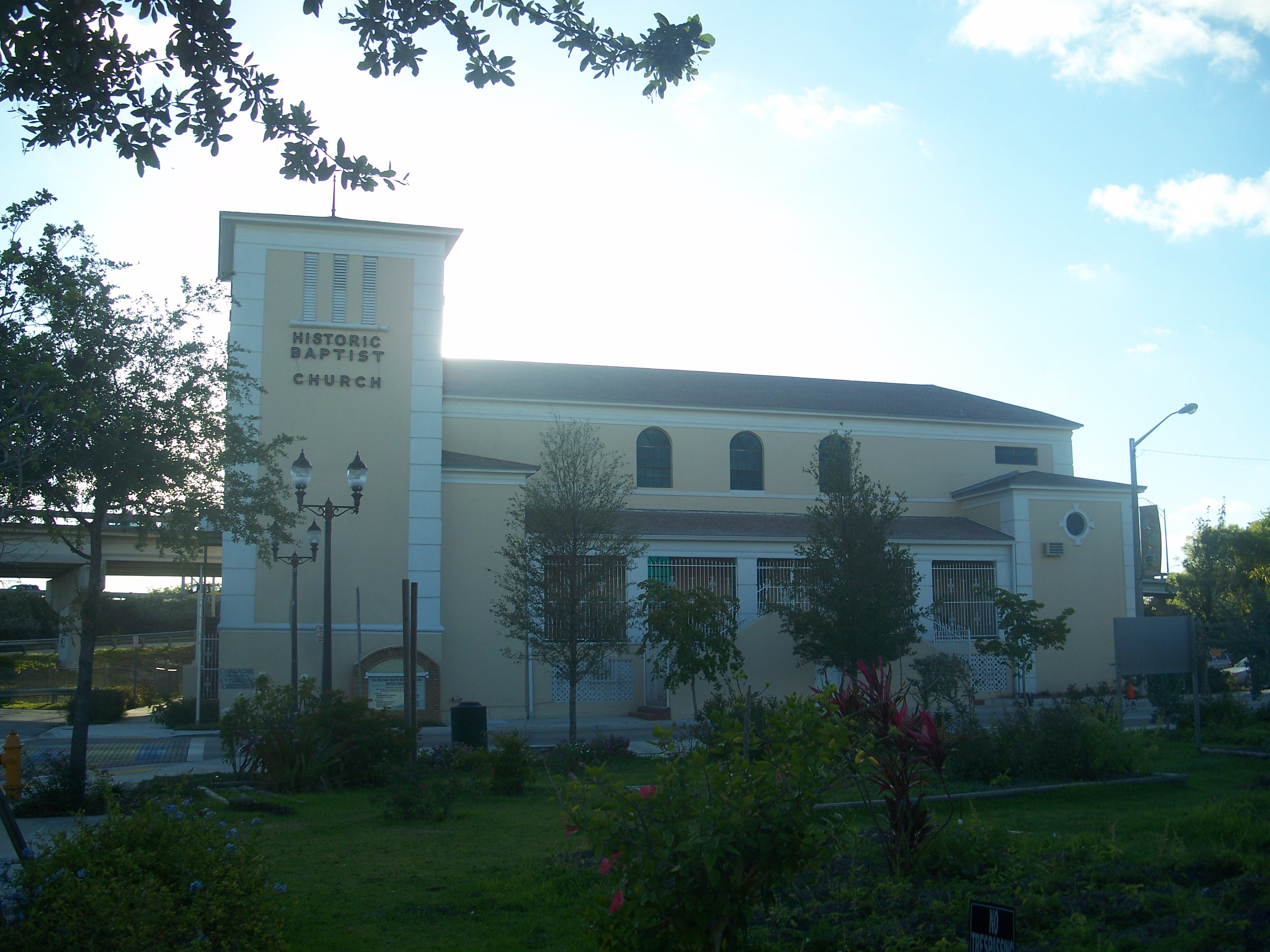
Mt. Zion Baptist Church, 1928

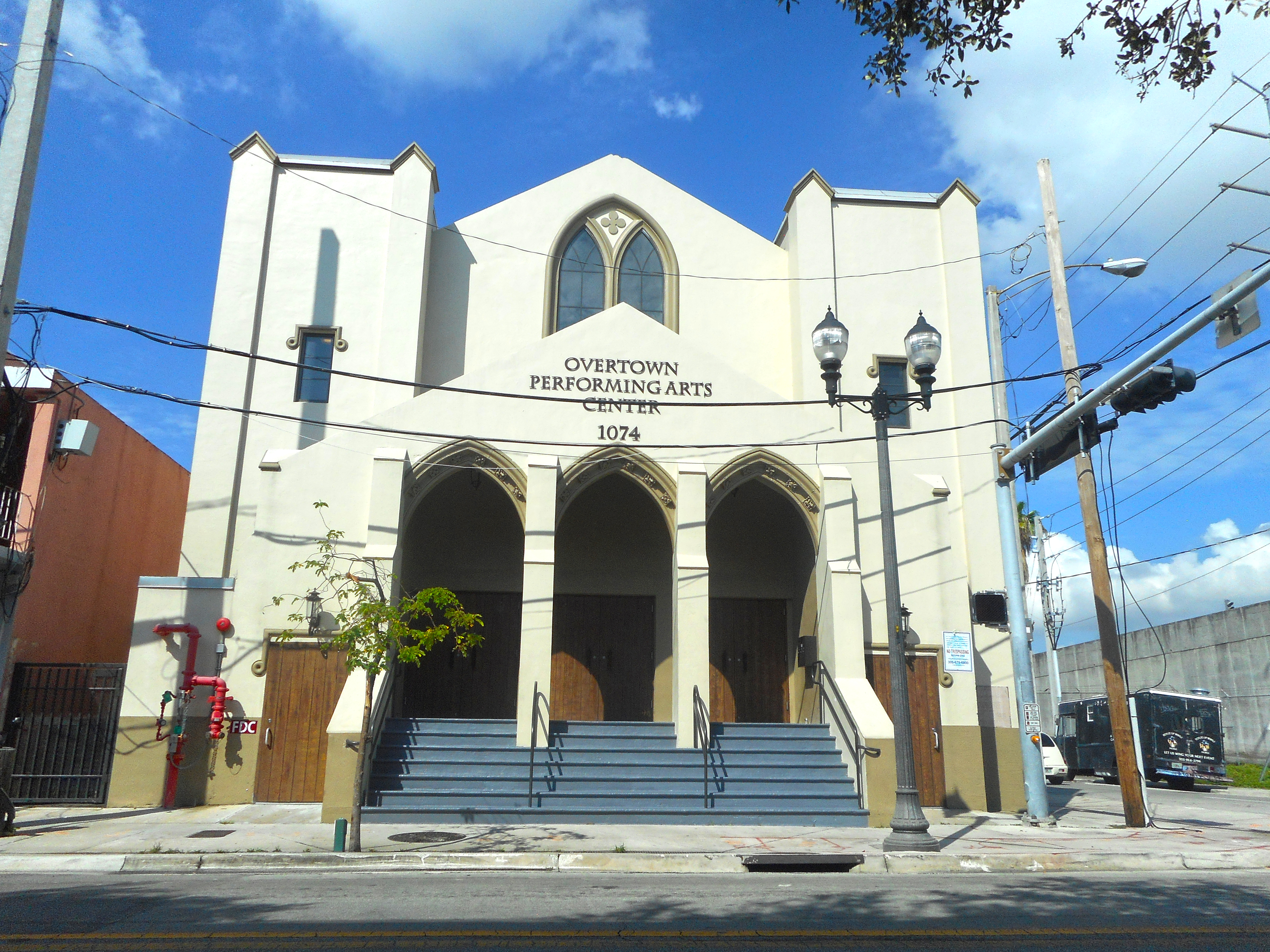
Ebenezer Methodist Church, 1948

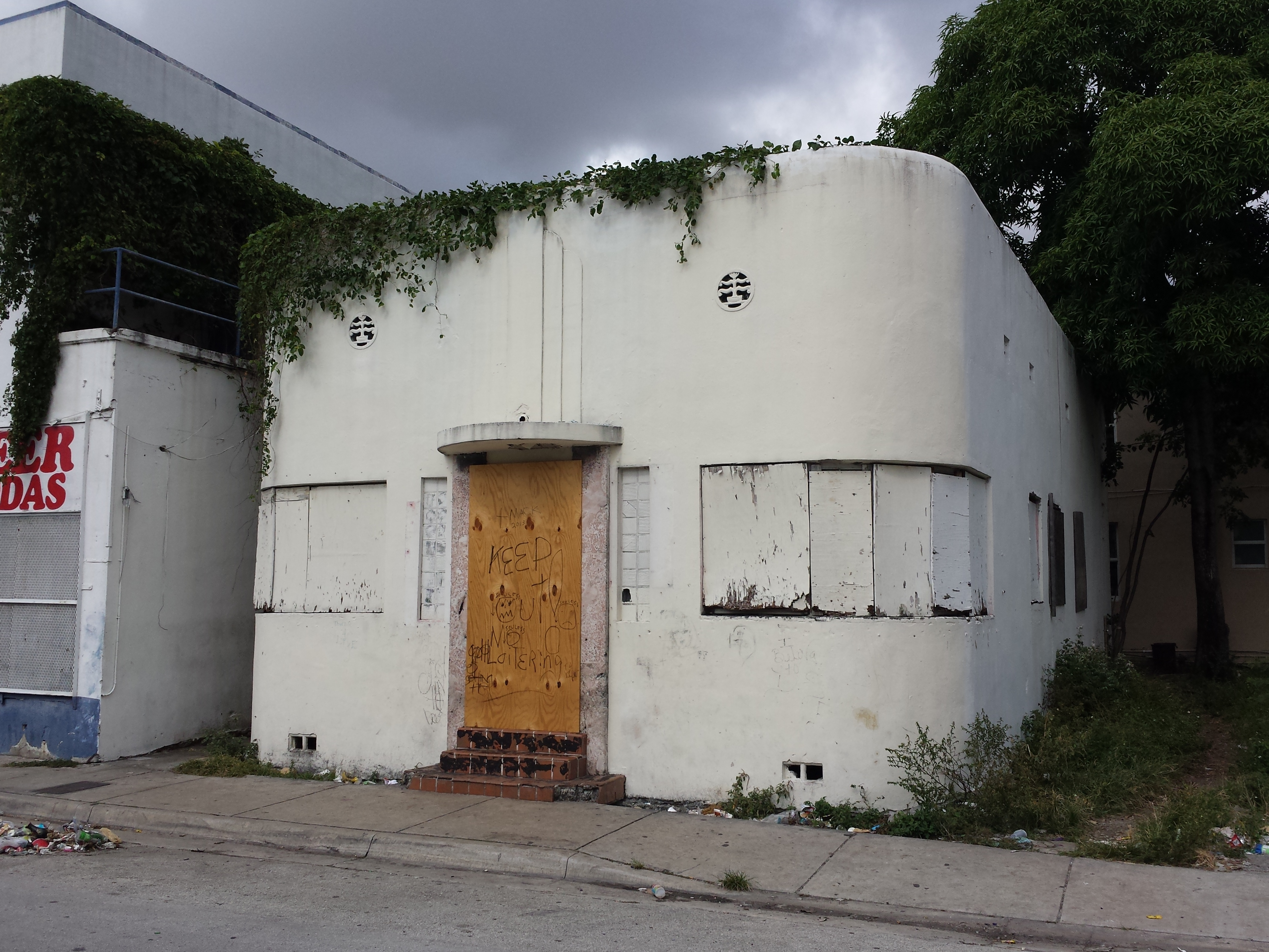
X-Ray Clinic, 1939

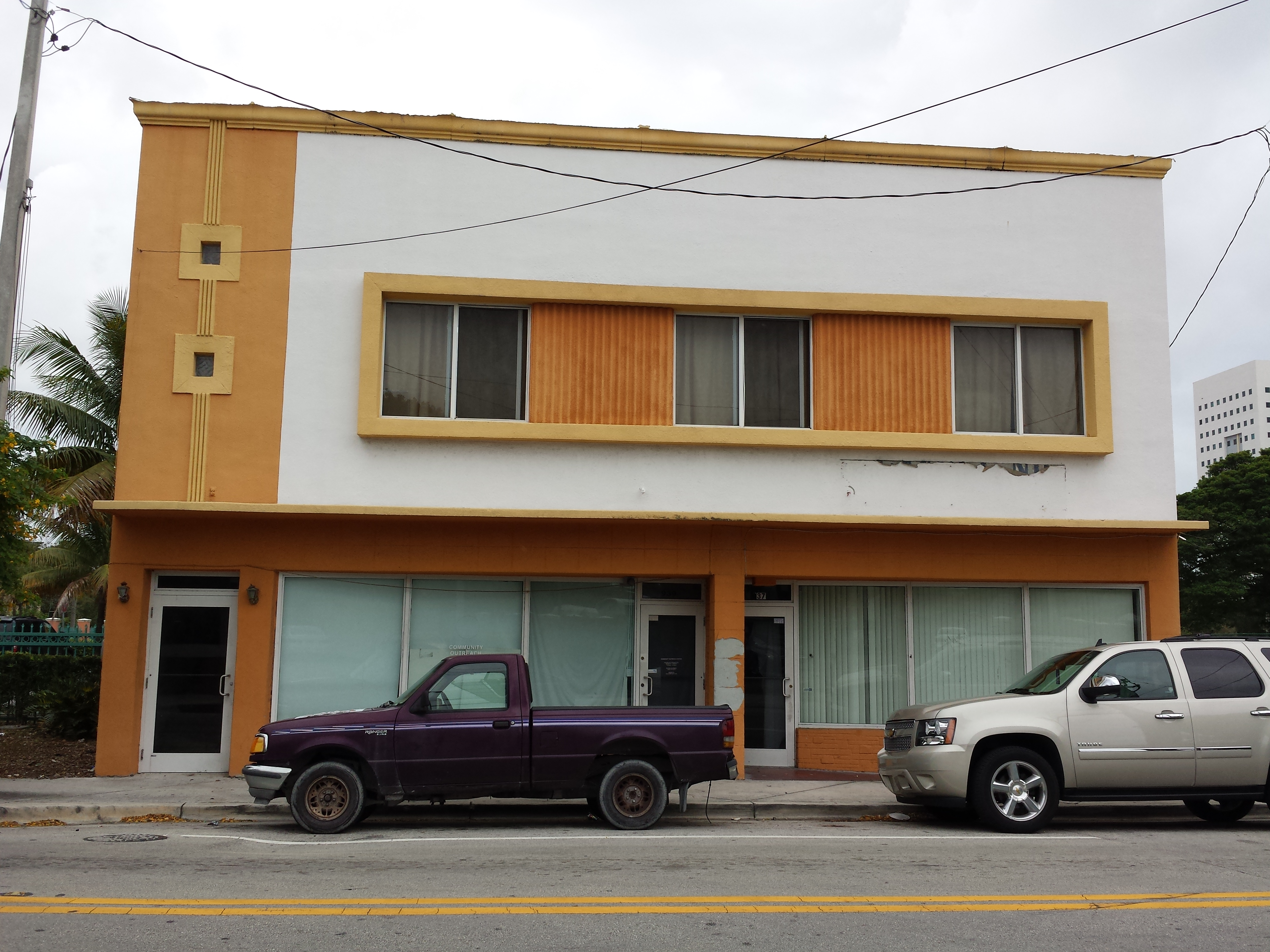
New Providence Lodge

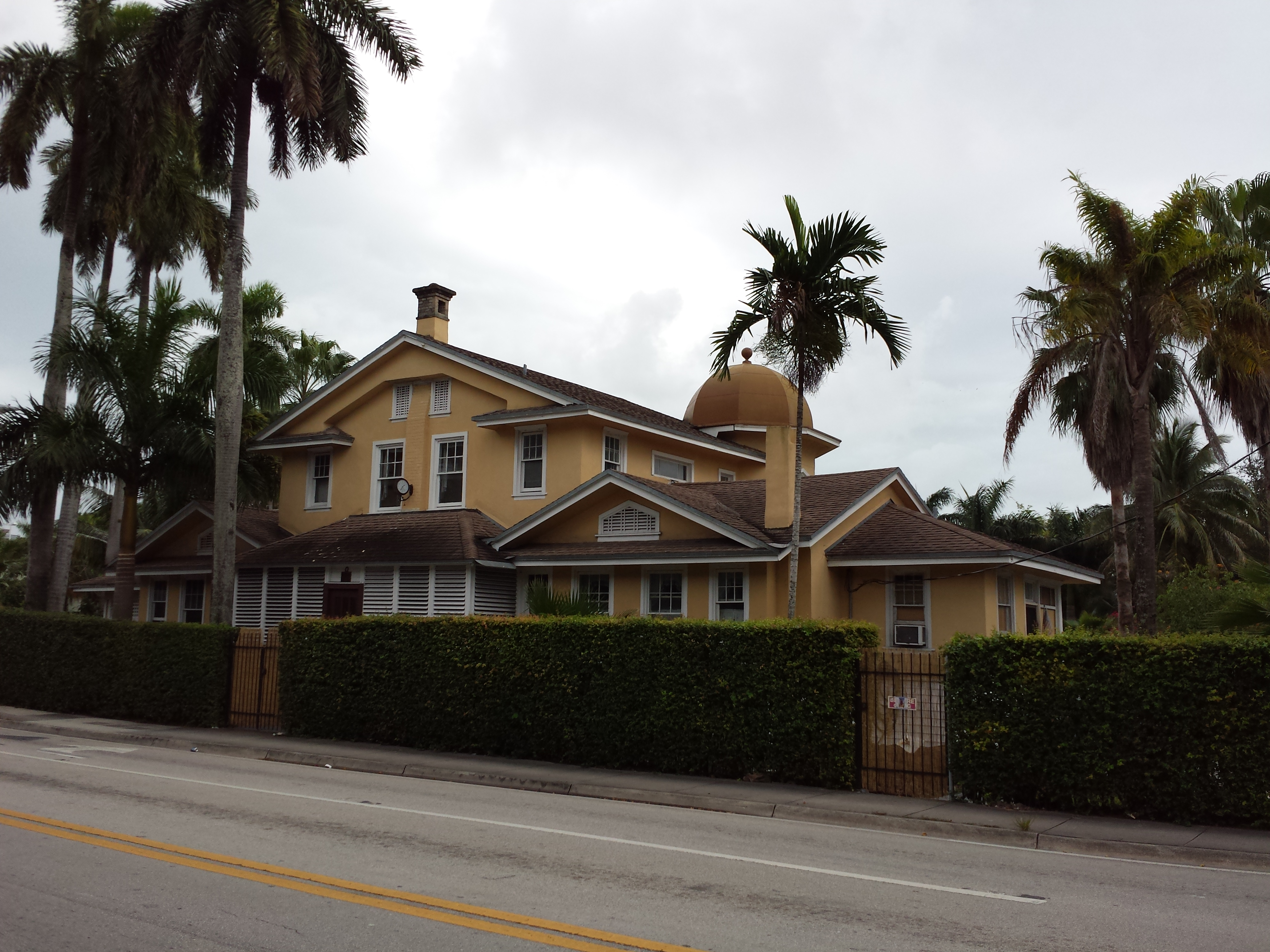
Spring Garden Hindu Temple

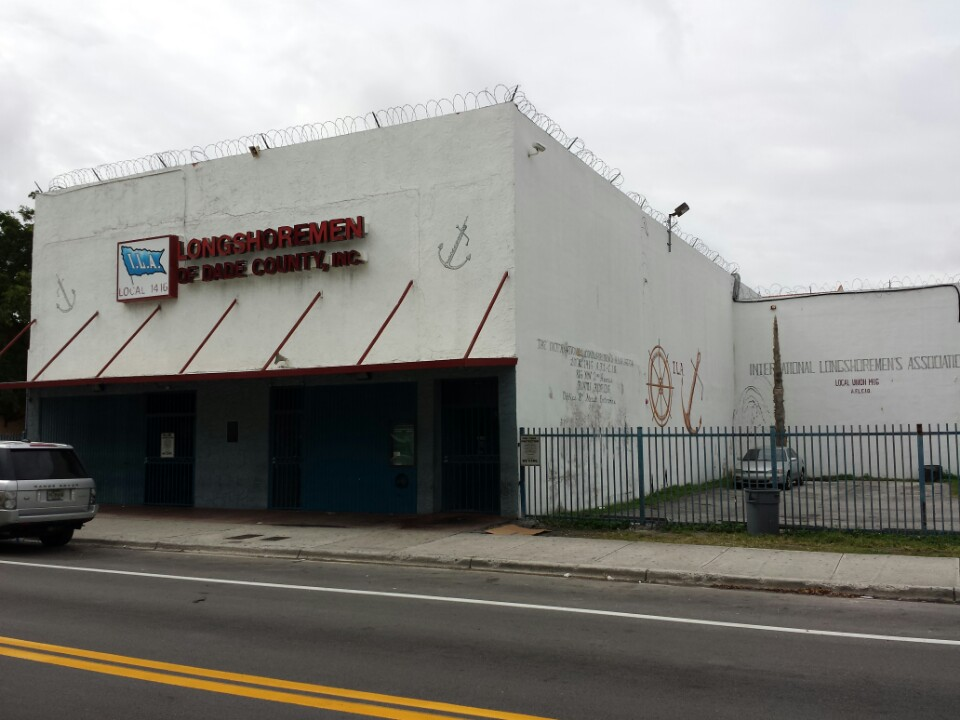
International Longshoremen's Association

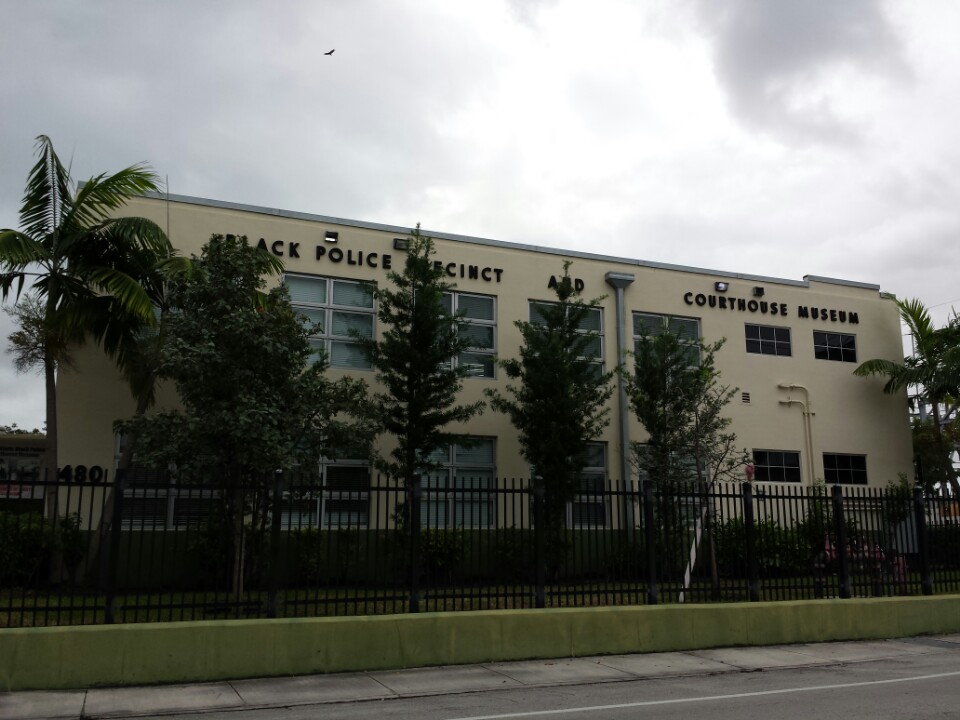
Black Police Precinct and Courthouse Museum

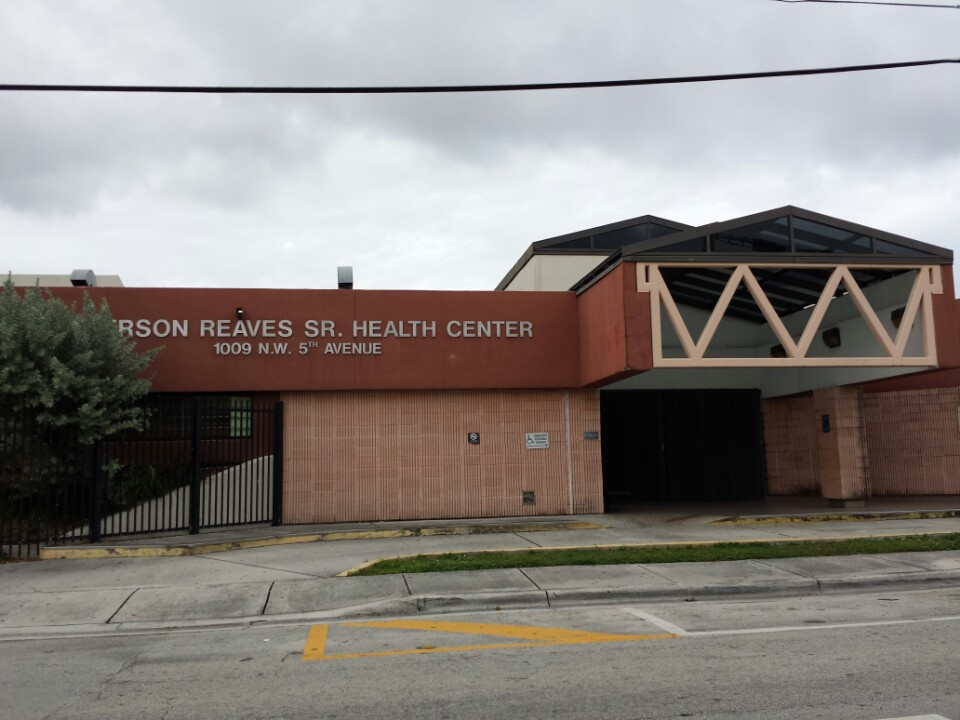
Jefferson Reaves Sr. Health Center

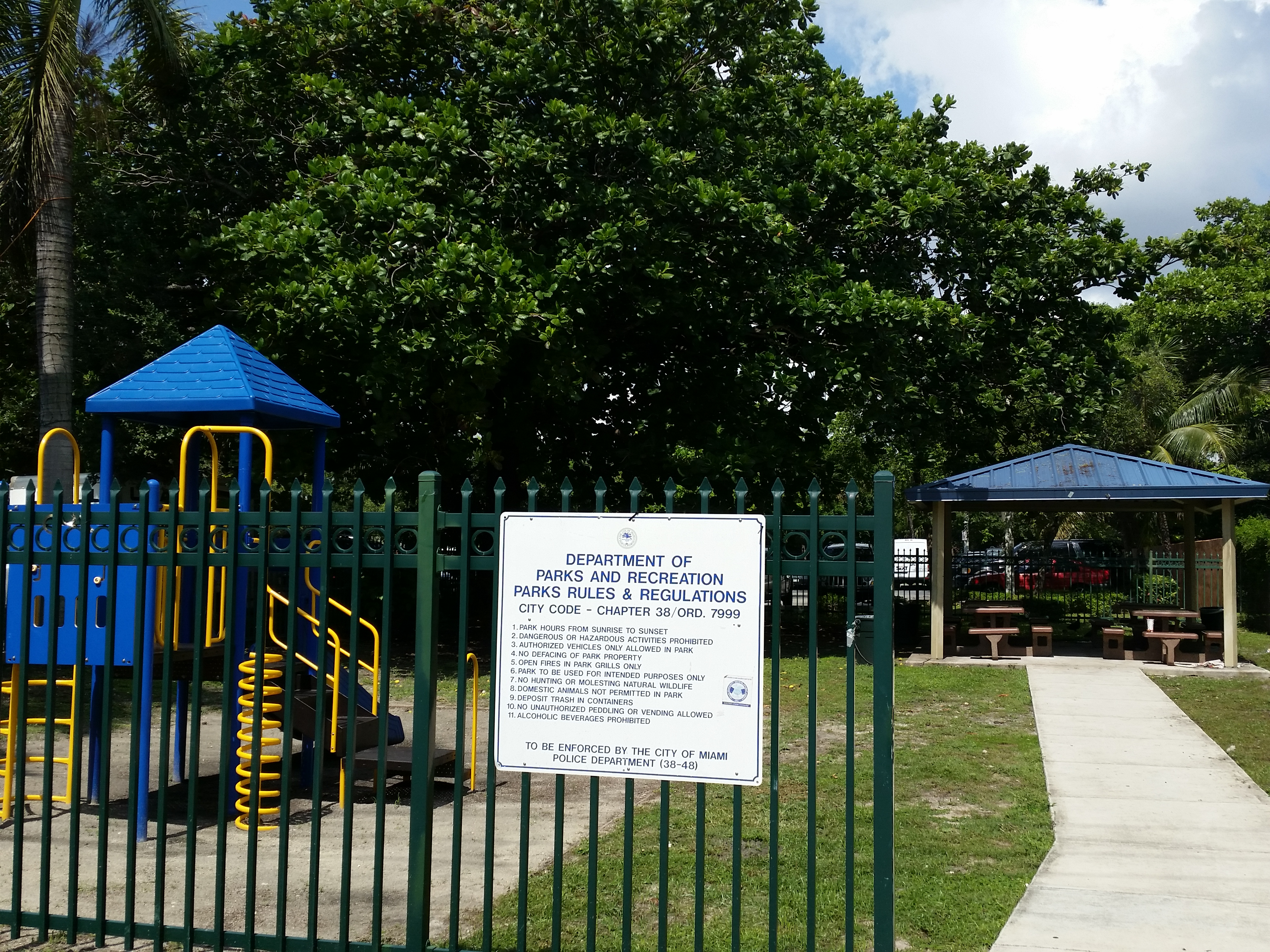
NW 3rd Avenue Park
