= Brownsville, California =

Brownsville, California may refer to:

- Brownsville, former name of Samoa, California
- Brownsville, former name of Tecopa, California
- Challenge-Brownsville, California
