= Brownsville, Georgia =

Unincorporated community in Georgia, U.S.

Coordinates: 33°47′58″N 84°45′27″W

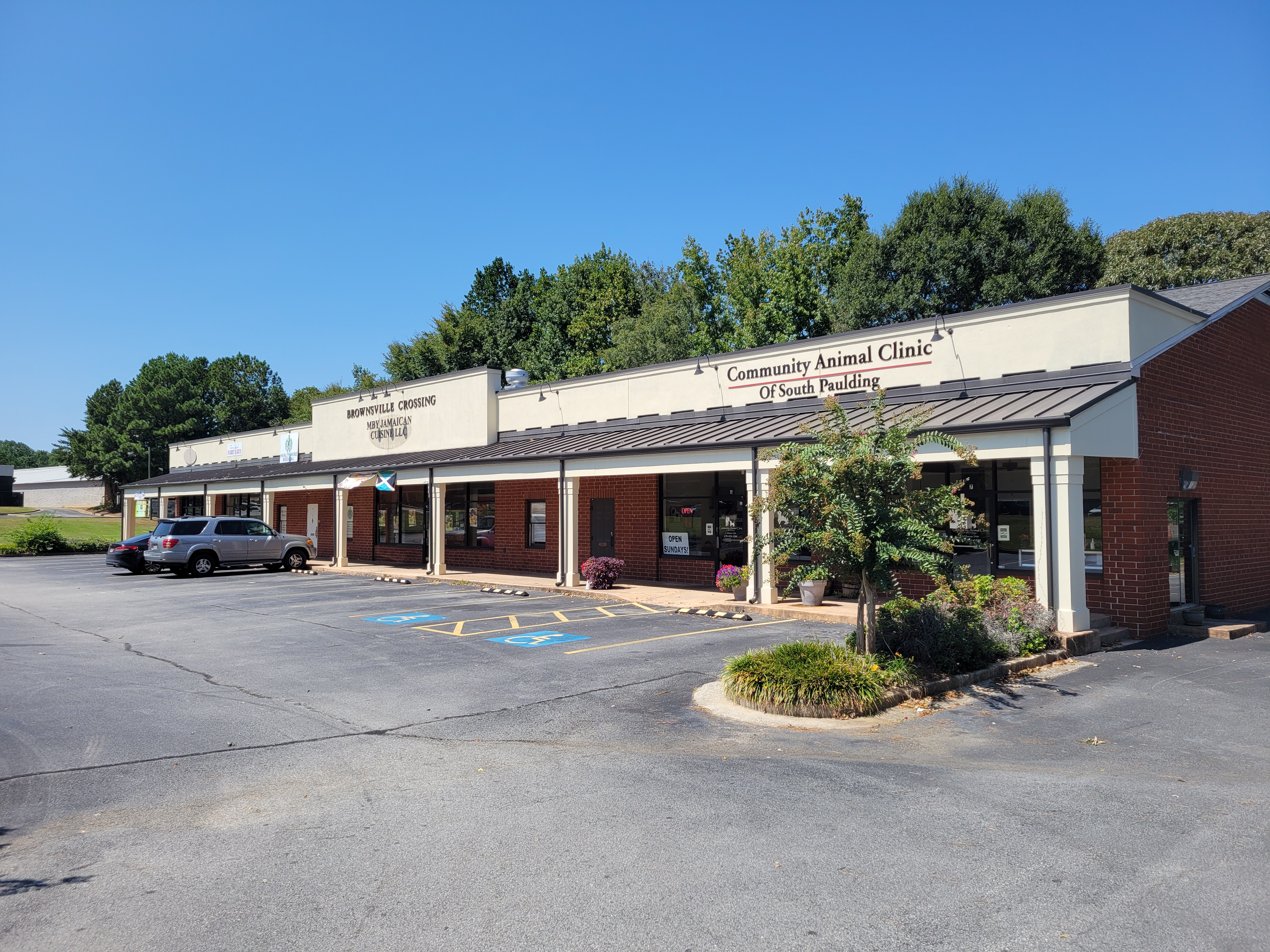
Brownsville Crossing

Brownsville is an unincorporated community in Paulding County, in the U.S. state of Georgia.

== History ==
A post office was in operation at Brownsville from 1860 until 1905. The community's name may have been intended to honor John Brown, a local Methodist reverend.
