= Willie Logan =

American politician (born 1957)

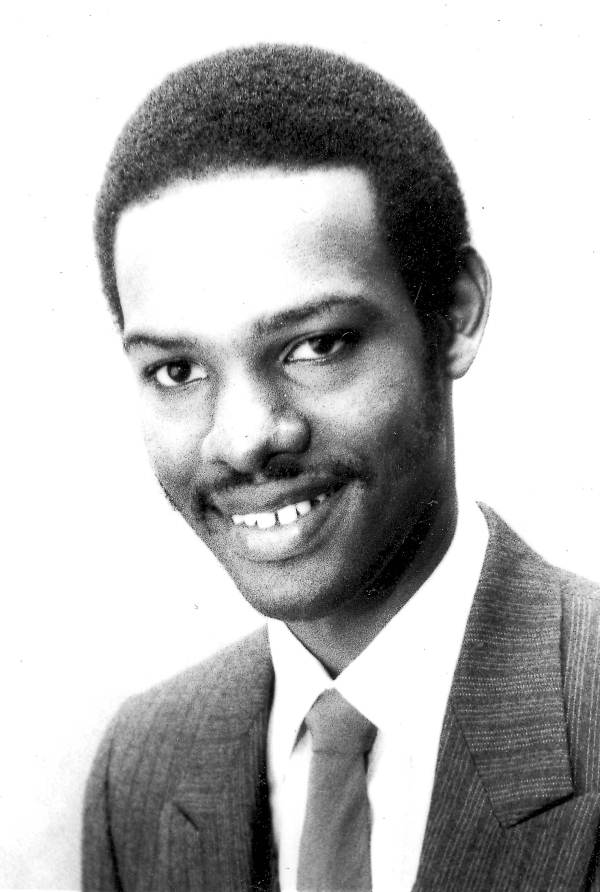

Member of the Florida House of Representatives
- In office January 1983 – January 2001
- Preceded by: Robert R. Reynolds (108th); Michael Friedman (103rd)
- Succeeded by: Beryl Roberts (108th); Wilbert Holloway (103rd)
- Constituency: 108th district (1983–1993); 103rd district (1993–2001)

Mayor of Opa-Locka, Florida
- In office 1980–1982
- Preceded by: Willie Young
- Succeeded by: Helen L. Miller

Personal details
- Born: February 16, 1957 (age 69) Miami-Dade County, Florida
- Party: Democratic (1983-2000, 2004-present); Independent (2000)

Willie Logan (born February 16, 1957) is an American politician from the U.S. state of Florida. A former member of the Florida House of Representatives, he campaigned for the United States Senate as an independent in 2000.

== Biography ==
Born in Northern Miami-Dade County, Logan graduated from high school in 1975, Logan attended Miami-Dade Community College, from which he earned an associate's degree, before graduating with a Bachelor of Science degree from the University of Miami in 1977.

After working for three years in the insurance industry, and volunteering for several political campaigns, Logan made his first run for public office in 1980, being elected mayor of Opa-locka, Florida at age 23, making him the youngest mayor of any American city at that time. That same year, he founded the Opa-locka Community Development Corporation, a non-profit that he eventually built into a multi-million dollar organization with five subsidiaries.

In 1998, Logan touched off a firestorm of controversy when, after serving for 16 years and becoming one of the caucus' senior legislators, he was ousted as the first African American Speaker-designate in the Chamber's history by his fellow Democratic legislators and defeated for the post of minority leader. Logan's detractors claimed that this was because of Logan's apparent disinterest in caucus affairs, while his supporters charged that it was the result of racism, as Logan had been defeated by a white candidate.

Whatever the reason, the results of the caucus election formed a rift between Logan and his party. That year, he endorsed Republican nominee Jeb Bush in his campaign for Governor. He also formed an exploratory committee and began to test the waters for an independent campaign for the U.S. Senate.

On September 29, 1999, Logan officially announced his candidacy as an independent. Under the slogan "Think Independent", he embarked on a motorcycle tour of the state, which ended with a rally at the state capitol in Tallahassee. Hiring Bill Hillsman, the adman credited with the upset victories of Senator Paul Wellstone and Governor Jesse Ventura in Minnesota, Logan aired one television ad, entitled "Shades", in which, in an homage to the film Patton, the sunglasses-clad Logan stood onstage before a blown-up $1 million-bill and inveighed against "Big Money politics".

In addition to his position in favor of strict campaign finance reform, which was the central issue of his campaign, Logan also campaigned on promises to enact strong environmental protection and gun control laws, slash corporate welfare, reduce spending on military programs that he deemed unnecessary, enact the Patients' Bill of Rights, cut the income tax for couples making $70,000 a year or less, protect the Social Security Trust Fund, and open up trade with China.

Although opinion polls generally showed Logan's support to be in the double digits, sufficient to gain him entry into a series of televised debates between the "major" candidates (which Logan was widely believed to have won), this support proved ephemeral on Election Day, as Logan placed a distant third with just 80,830 votes, or about 1.38%.

In March 2001, Logan, who had retired from the House in order to run for the U.S. Senate, was arrested in a public restroom in Miami Beach on charges of indecent exposure, battery, and possession of marijuana. The affidavit filed by the arresting officer claimed that Logan was seen masturbating in one of the restroom's stalls and subsequently resisted arrest. A single marijuana "joint" was found in his pocket. Logan was released on bail and, in August of that year, all charges against him were dropped after a judge ruled all evidence against him inadmissible on the grounds that the arresting officer had violated his right to privacy by spying on him through a peephole in the bathroom stall.

In 2004, Logan made an aborted attempt at a political comeback, entering the race for Miami-Dade County Commissioner, seeking to represent the first district. Running as a Democrat, he placed second in the August primary with 26% of the vote, but lost the November runoff to fellow Democrat Barbara Jordan, receiving just 39% of the vote.

== See also ==
- Youth politics

Florida House of Representatives
Preceded by Bob Reynolds	Member of the Florida House of Representatives from the 108th district 1983–1993	Succeeded by Beryl Roberts
Preceded by Michael Friedman	Member of the Florida House of Representatives from the 103rd district 1993–2001	Succeeded by Wilbert Holloway
