= Oscar Braynon =

American politician

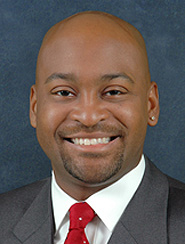

Minority Leader of the Florida Senate
- In office November 21, 2016 – November 19, 2018
- Preceded by: Arthenia Joyner
- Succeeded by: Audrey Gibson

Member of the Florida Senate
- In office March 8, 2011 – November 3, 2020
- Preceded by: Frederica Wilson
- Succeeded by: Shevrin Jones
- Constituency: 33rd district (2011–2012); 36th district (2012–2016); 35th district (2016–2020)

Member of the Florida House of Representatives from the 103rd district
- In office March 4, 2008 – February 28, 2011
- Preceded by: Wilbert Holloway
- Succeeded by: Barbara Watson

Personal details
- Born: February 1, 1977 (age 49) Corpus Christi, Texas, U.S.
- Party: Democratic
- Spouse: Melissa
- Children: 2
- Education: Florida State University, Tallahassee (BS)

Oscar Braynon, II (born February 1, 1977) is an American Democratic politician from Miami Gardens, Florida. He served in the Florida House of Representatives from 2008 to 2011 and then in the Florida Senate from 2011 to 2020, representing parts of southern Broward and northern Miami-Dade County.

== History ==
Braynon was born in Corpus Christi, Texas, and moved to Miami Gardens, Florida, where he attended North Miami Beach High School. During high school he served as Student Government Association Vice-President his junior year, followed by President for his senior year. He was also a sprinter on the school’s track team. He finished sixth in the 400m at the State High School Track Meet of the Florida High School Athletic Association in 1995, his graduating year. Senator Braynon attended the Florida State University, where he received a degree in political science in 2000. Following graduation, he worked in the legislative office of State Representative Kendrick Meek as an intern, and then for the Miami-Dade County Commission as a legislative aide and public relations coordinator. In 2003, he was elected to the Miami Gardens City Council over Oliver Gilbert, receiving 57% of the vote to Gilbert's 43%. He served on the City Council from 2003 to 2008, serving as Vice-Mayor of the city from 2005 to 2007.

== Florida House of Representatives ==
When incumbent State Representative Wilbert "Tee" Holloway was appointed to the Miami-Dade County School Board by then-Governor Charlie Crist in 2007, a special election was held to replace him in the 103rd District in 2008, which included Miami Gardens, Opa-locka, and Pembroke Pines in southern Broward County and northern Miami-Dade County. Braynon opted to run in the special election, and faced former Opa-locka Mayor Myra Taylor in the Democratic primary. He defeated Taylor in a landslide, receiving 62% of the vote to Tayloe's 38%, and was elected unopposed in the special general election. When he ran for re-election later that year, he won his party's nomination unopposed and the general election uncontested once again, and then was re-elected without opposition in 2010 as well.

== Florida Senate ==
In 2010, State Senator Frederica Wilson was elected to Congress, creating a vacancy in the Florida Senate in the 33rd District, which included Miami, Miami Gardens, and North Miami in northeastern Miami-Dade County. Braynon ran to succeed her, and was opposed by former State Representatives James Bush, Phillip Brutus, and Darryl Reaves. Braynon earned the endorsement of former Chief Financial Officer Alex Sink and significantly out-raised the other three candidates. Bush, Brutus, and Reaves focused their attacks on Braynon, criticizing him for working for a Tallahassee law firm, while Braynon ran on his legislative experience, noting, "Everything I've done has helped my district, and my record shows that." Ultimately, Braynon emerged narrowly victorious in the primary, receiving 42% of the vote to Brutus's 38%, Bush's 12%, and Reaves's 9%, and advanced to the general election, where he faced former North Miami Mayor Joe Celestin. He campaigned on his record in the legislature, argued that his opponent would vote with his party if elected, and criticized Governor Rick Scott's budget for being "unconstitutional." Braynon defeated Celestin in a landslide, scoring 74% of the vote to Celestin's 26%.

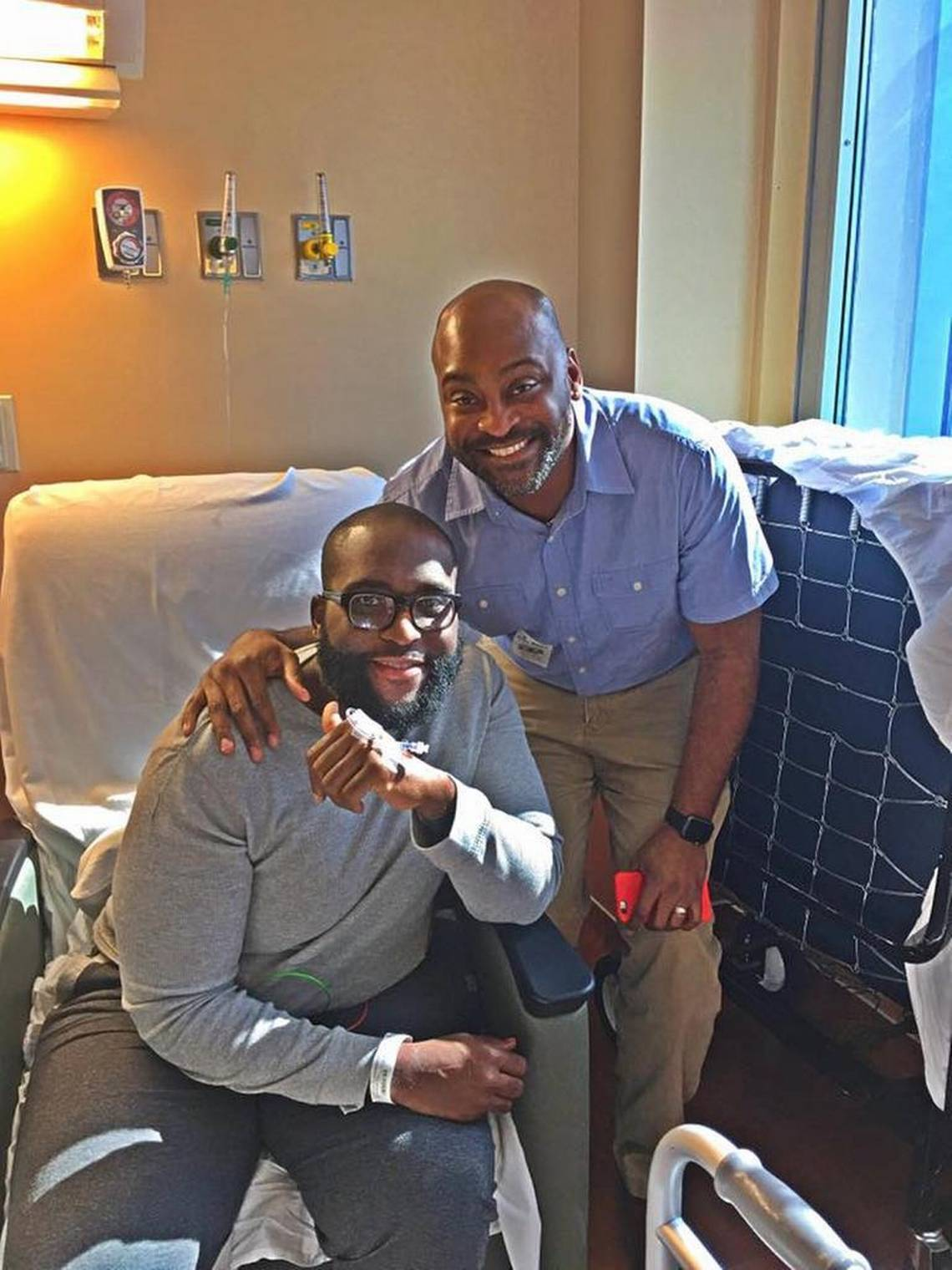
Then-incoming Senate Democratic Party leader Oscar Braynon of Miami Gardens visits West Park Democratic Party State Rep. Shevrin Jones, left, on Nov. 4 while Jones was still in a Broward County rehabilitation center after recovering from emergency spinal surgery

When the state's legislative districts were redrawn in 2012, Braynon was moved into the 36th District, where he opted to run for re-election. He was unopposed in both the primary and the general elections, and won his second term entirely uncontested.

In 2014, Braynon faced a Democratic primary challenge from a first-time candidate, whom he defeated 70 to 30%. Braynon defeated a write-in opponent in the general election.

Braynon's district was reconfigured and renumbered after court-ordered redistricting in 2016, and he was re-elected in the new district unopposed. Because of the renumbering and the Senate’s staggered terms, he will face term limits two years earlier (2020) than he would have under the previous plan (2022). Previously, Braynon, having been elected in 2012 from an even-numbered district (#36) and re-elected in 2014, would have faced having to run for another four-year term in 2018 before being term limited in 2022.

During the opening of the 2018 Florida Legislative Session, Braynon and Senator Anitere Flores jointly apologized for a sexual affair they had, which had been made public when an anonymous website uploaded a video showing Flores entering and leaving Braynon's apartment on multiple occasions. Both legislators are married with children.

Braynon was term-limited from the Senate in 2020.

Florida Senate
Preceded by Arthenia Joyner	Minority Leader of the Florida Senate; 2016–2018	Succeeded by Audrey Gibson
