= John Riley (mayor) =

American politician who served as mayor of Opa-Locka, Florida

John B. Riley
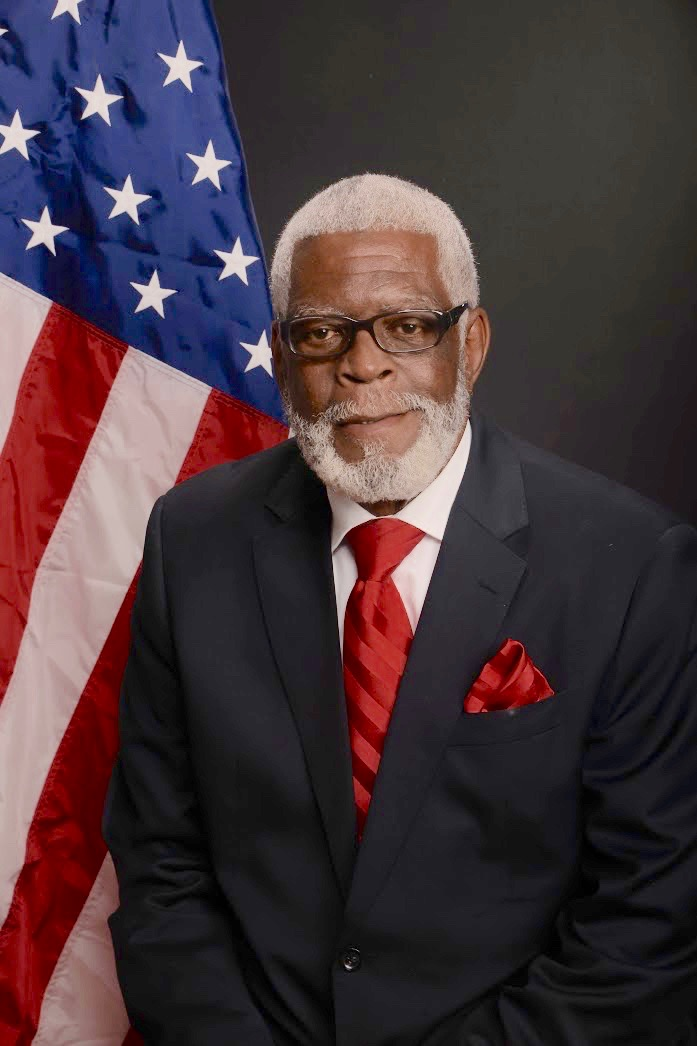

Mayor of Opa-Locka, Florida
- In office 1984–1986
- Preceded by: Helen L. Miller
- Succeeded by: Robert B. Ingram

City Commission of Opa-locka, Florida
- In office 1982–1986

Personal details
- Born: 1943 or 1944 (age 81–82) Gadsden, Alabama
- Education: University of Maryland

John B. Riley (born 1943/1944) was an American politician who served as mayor and commissioner of Opa-Locka, Florida.

== Biography ==
Riley was born in Gadsden, Alabama and attended the University of Maryland. He worked as chairman of the Opa-Locka Housing Authority. In 1982, Riley ran for one of three seats available on the City Commission. Eight candidates were reduced to six after the primaries. Running against commissioner Helen Miller, commissioner Donna McKenna, John Hennessey, Vance Philipps, and Guillermo Lazo, he was narrowly defeated in the April election coming in 4th place behind Miller (who became Opa-Locka's first female mayor), McKenna (who became deputy mayor), and Lazo (the city's first Latino commissioner). When commissioner Willie Logan resigned after winning election to the Florida House of Representatives, Riley won a special election on November 2, 1982 to serve out the remainder of Logan's term (through April 1984) on the City Commission defeating Stuart Susaneck, Vince Cooper, Gloria Giardino (wife of former mayor Candido Giardino), and George Lipkins.

In the April 1984 general election with three seats on the five man commission being contested, Riley was the top vote getter earning him a 4-year term on the commission, the first two of which he would serve as mayor. The two remaining seats were won by his political allies Brian Hooten and Stuart Susaneck, both white, which ended Black control of the commission (the preceding mayor, Helen Miller, being the only remaining Black commissioner). Riley faced a $1,000,000 budget deficit. While mayor, he was able to balance the budget, began the process of developing a downtown district through rezoning, and completed the restoration of city hall. He also unsuccessfully proposed that the city shift to a strong mayor form of government although he was able to get the City Commission to approve the direct election of the mayor (previously, the top vote getter won a 4-year stint as commissioner with the first two years of the term as mayor).

Riley resigned from his position as mayor effective November 4, 1986 so he could run for re-election as mayor (otherwise he would have to finish out his remaining two-year term as commissioner). Riley's popularity suffered after he was accused of accepting a bribe related to the relocation of a flea market, overspending his expense account, and not paying his water bill. In the October 1986 mayoral primary, he finished fourth against Republican Kenneth Bowens, former Opa-Locka police chief Robert B. Ingram, former commissioner and police chief Robert Knapp, and former mayor and current commissioner Helen L. Miller. As no candidate won a majority, a run-off election was held in November between Miller and Ingram with Ingram as the victor. It was the first election where the voters directly elected the mayor.

In November 1998, he unsuccessfully ran for one of three open seats on the City Commission losing to incumbent Myra Taylor and newcomers, Bobby Bradley and Derrick Miller. In November 2002, he unsuccessfully ran for mayor losing in the primary to Alvin Miller and Myra L. Taylor (Taylor went on to win). In September 2004, he unsuccessfully ran for mayor in a special election on September 7, 2004 after mayor Myra L. Taylor was removed from office by governor Jeb Bush; he received 33.52% of the votes compared to Joseph L. Kelley with 44.47% of the votes. In November 2012, he unsuccessfully ran for a seat on the City Commission. In November 2018, he again ran for mayor but lost in a 4-way race against Rose Tydus, Dorothy "Dottie" Johnson, and Matthew Pigatt. Pigatt won the contest.
