= John B. Riley =

John B. Riley may refer to:

- John Bernard Riley (born 1954), American jazz musician
- John Riley (mayor) (born 1943/1944), American mayor
