= Quackenbush v. United States =

Ryder v. United States
- Supreme Court of the United States

Argued February 1, 1900 Decided March 19, 1900
- Full case name: Quackenbush v. United States
- Citations: 177 U.S. 20 (more)

Holding
- The appointment of an officer of the United States and the issuance of his commission are distinct acts. Appointments must be made as required by law and the commission cannot alter these requirements.

Court membership
- Chief Justice Melville Fuller Associate Justices John M. Harlan · Horace Gray; David J. Brewer · Henry B. Brown; George Shiras Jr. · Edward D. White; Rufus W. Peckham · Joseph McKenna

Case opinion
- Majority: Fuller, joined by unanimous

Laws applied
- U.S. Const. art. II, § 2, cl. 2

Quackenbush v. United States, 177 U.S. 20 (1900), was a decision of the United States Supreme Court in which the court held that The appointment of an officer of the United States and the issuance of his commission are distinct acts. Appointments must be made as required by law and the commission cannot alter these requirements.
