= Albert Tresvant =

American politician who served as mayor of Opa-Locka, Florida

Mayor of Opa-Locka, Florida
- In office April 18, 1975 – April 1976
- Preceded by: Kenton Wells
- Succeeded by: Candido Giardino

City Council of Opa-locka, Florida
- In office January 1972 – June 1977

Personal details
- Born: Albert Tresvant; April 15, 1926 Brunswick, Georgia
- Died: July 25, 2004 (age 78)
- Party: Democratic
- Spouse: Virginia Wilkinson
- Children: 6

Albert Tresvant (April 15, 1926 – July 25, 2004) was an American politician who served as the first African-American commissioner and mayor of Opa-Locka, Florida and first African-American mayor in Dade County.

== Biography ==
Tresvant was born in Brunswick, Georgia. When he was five, his mother died and he moved to Liberty City neighborhood of Miami where he was raised by his aunt and grandmother. He attended Liberty City Elementary School and is a graduate of D.A. Dorsey Senior High School. After school he ran his own upholstery business before getting involved in politics. In 1956, he established the Opa-locka Civic Club to organize the Black community on improving the city. In 1964, his first run for the City Commission received national attention although he lost receiving little white support. In January 1972, Tresvant was nominated by commissioner Bert T. Goodson to fill a vacancy on the City Commission and unanimously appointed due to his record of civic involvement and the commission's desire to have minority representation. His appointment followed on riots that occurred in 1971 after a white police officer shot a black man. At the time, Opa-locka was roughly 35-40% Black and there was no district gerrymandering as City Commissioners in Opa-locka were elected at-large with the largest vote-getter becoming mayor. In April 1972, after serving the 3 months of his predecessor's term, Tresvant won a seat on the City Commission finishing third (656 votes) after Ronald Pierson (831 votes) and Lawrence Bowers (672 votes). His term was for two years (In Opa-Locka, elections to the 5-member City Commission are held every two years; the top two vote getters are elected to 4-year terms with the first serving a 2-year term as mayor and then a 2-year term as commissioner; the second serving a 2-year term as deputy mayor and then a 2-year term as commissioner; and the third vote-getter serving a 2-year term as commissioner).

In the 1974 election, Tresvant tied for first place with Kenton Wells; they decided to split the two-year mayoral term with Wells serving the first year and Tresvant's term beginning in 1975. Both men would serve as city commissioner during the other's mayor ship. He was sworn in on April 18, 1975.

Upon becoming mayor, he inherited a tense situation as riots had occurred during Well's term which Tresvant blamed on Dade county for repeatedly rejecting Opa-locka's requests for additional funds to provide better housing and drug programs. He also worked to hire more Black police officers inheriting a department where only 3 out of 28 officers were Black. During his administration, he was able to secure more police protection for Black neighborhoods, appointed more Blacks into city government, and developed infrastructure. In the April 1976 general election, Candido Giardino was elected as mayor (Tresvant was unable to run due to his remaining two-year term on the City Commission).

In June 1977, he was suspended as commissioner by Governor Rubin Askew over corruption allegations. In July 1977, he was found guilty of conspiracy, soliciting bribes and accepting unlawful compensation in connection with a city building contract along with then mayor Candido Giardino (the Rev. Willie R. Young was elected mayor in April 1978); the sentence was overturned and a new trial ordered by Circuit Court Judge Wilkie Ferguson after one juror failed to disclose a past criminal conviction and another juror complained that Tresvant had followed her into the parking lot during the trial. The Third District Court of Appeal reinstated the conviction.

== Personal life ==
He was married to Virginia Wilkinson; they had five daughters and a son. He died on July 25, 2004.

== See also ==
- List of first African-American mayors
