= Boske v. Comingore =

- Supreme Court of the United States

Decided April 9, 1900
- Full case name: Boske v. Comingore
- Citations: 177 U.S. 459 (more)

Holding
- An officer of an executive agency may exercise executive privilege to deny a subpoena from a federal court, and the head of that agency may issue a regulation requiring any such disclosure to be approved by that agency head.

Court membership
- Chief Justice Melville Fuller Associate Justices John M. Harlan · Horace Gray; David J. Brewer · Henry B. Brown; George Shiras Jr. · Edward D. White; Rufus W. Peckham · Joseph McKenna

Case opinion
- Majority: Harlan, joined by unanimous

Laws applied
- Housekeeping Statute

Boske v. Comingore, 177 U.S. 459 (1900), was a United States Supreme Court case in which the Court held that an officer of an executive agency may exercise executive privilege to deny a subpoena from a federal court, and the head of that agency may issue a regulation requiring any such disclosure to be approved by that agency head.

== See also ==
- United States ex rel. Touhy v. Ragen
