= Bad Elk v. United States =

- Supreme Court of the United States

Argued February 26, 1900 Decided April 30, 1900
- Full case name: John Bad Elk v. United States
- Citations: 177 U.S. 529 (more) 20 S. Ct. 729; 44 L. Ed. 874; 1900 U.S. LEXIS 1823

Case history
- Prior: United States v. Bad Elk (C.C.D.S.D. 1899) (unreported)

Holding
- Held that an individual had the right to use force to resist an unlawful arrest and was entitled to a jury instruction to that effect.

Court membership
- Chief Justice Melville Fuller Associate Justices John M. Harlan · Horace Gray; David J. Brewer · Henry B. Brown; George Shiras Jr. · Edward D. White; Rufus W. Peckham · Joseph McKenna

Case opinion
- Majority: Peckham, joined by unanimous

Laws applied
- Common law: Self-defense

Bad Elk v. United States, 177 U.S. 529 (1900), was a United States Supreme Court case in which the Court held that an individual had the right to use force to resist an unlawful arrest and was entitled to a jury instruction to that effect.

In 1899, a tribal police officer, John Bad Elk, shot and killed another tribal police officer who was attempting to arrest Bad Elk without a warrant, on a misdemeanor charge, for a crime allegedly committed outside of the presence of the arresting officer. The Supreme Court reversed his conviction, noting that a person had the right to resist an unlawful arrest, and in the case of a death, murder may be reduced to manslaughter. The Supreme Court held the arrest to be unlawful due, in part, to the lack of a valid warrant.

== Background ==
=== Common law history ===
The English common law has long recognized the right of an individual to resist with reasonable force an attempt of a police officer to make an unlawful arrest. This offered a complete defense if nonlethal force was used, and would reduce a murder charge to manslaughter if a death ensued. In Hopkin Huggett's case, English officials illegally seized a man to serve in the King's army. Huggett and others observed this and fought to free the man. In the course of the fight one of the King's men, John Barry, was killed and Huggett was put on trial for murder. The English court ruled that since the officer was making an unlawful arrest, the most that could be charged was manslaughter. In 1709, in Queen v. Tooley, the English court again found that when resisting an unlawful arrest, the death of an individual would result in a manslaughter charge instead of a murder charge. When the United States separated from England, the common law was adopted by the new American courts and the right to resist unlawful arrest was clearly recognized.

=== Death of John Kills Back ===
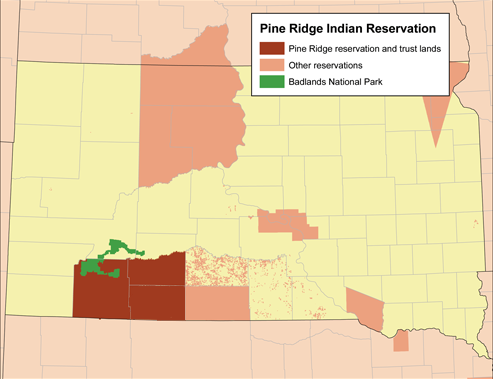
Map of Pine Ridge Indian Reservation

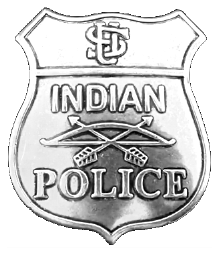
U.S. Indian Police badge, of type in use in South Dakota in 1890

On March 8, 1899, John Bad Elk fired several shots from his pistol from or near his home on the Pine Ridge Reservation. At the time Bad Elk was employed as a tribal police officer for the Oglala Lakota Sioux tribe. Captain Gleason, who was in charge of that part of the reservation, heard the shots and asked Bad Elk to stop by his office to discuss the matter, but Bad Elk did not show up. Gleason then ordered several other tribal police officers to arrest Bad Elk and to take him to the Pine Ridge Agency, about 25 miles away. Three officers contacted Bad Elk, who refused to go with them, telling them that he would go in the morning. The officers then tried to arrest Bad Elk, who shot and killed John Kills Back. Bad Elk claimed that Kills Back had reached for his pistol and that Bad Elk fired in self-defense. Kills Back and the other officers did not have an arrest warrant, nor was the offense one that they could arrest for without a warrant.

=== Trial ===
In April 1899 at Sioux Falls, Bad Elk was tried in the United States Circuit Court for the District of South Dakota for murder. At trial, Bad Elk requested a jury instruction allowing the jury to consider that he had a right to resist an unlawful arrest. Instead, the court gave a jury instruction that stated that Bad Elk did not have the right to resist an arrest and that Bad Elk only had the right to resist if the arresting officers used excessive force in making the arrest. The jury convicted Bad Elk and sentenced him to death. His execution date was set at June 16, 1899.

== Opinion of the Court ==
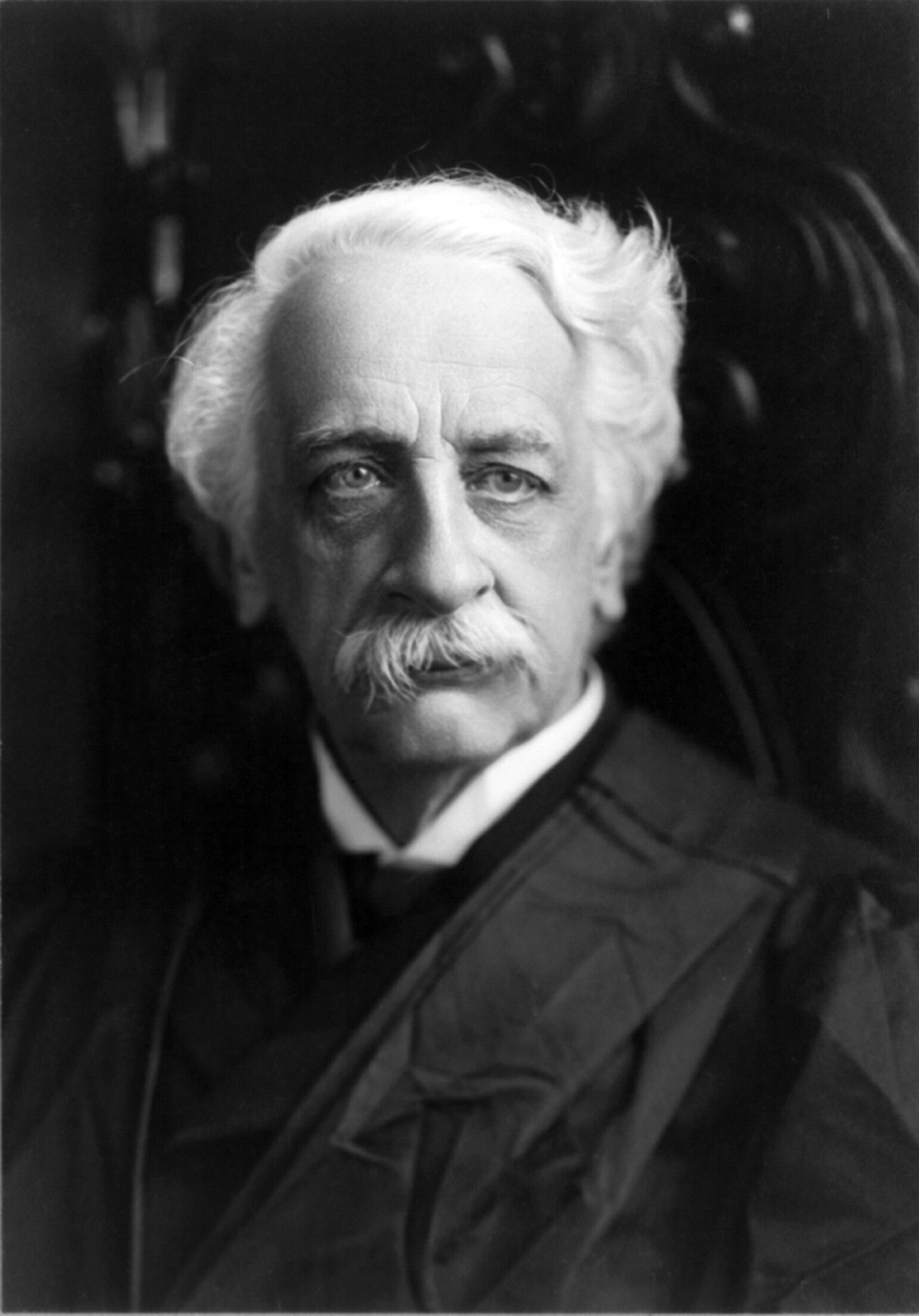
Justice Peckham, author of the unanimous opinion

Justice Rufus Wheeler Peckham delivered the opinion of a unanimous court. Peckham noted that the prosecution's case and the defendant's case varied in their presentation of the facts. First he noted that the prosecution did not show and the court could not find a legal basis for the arrest, that at most the firing of the pistol was a misdemeanor if it were a crime at all. An officer could arrest for a felony without a warrant, but to arrest for a misdemeanor, the crime had to have occurred in the officer's presence. They ruled that the captain also did not have the authority to order the arrest. The court noted that at common law, an individual had a right to use reasonable force to resist an unlawful arrest. Peckham said that the requested jury instruction was therefore material and that it was error for the trial court not to allow it. The court stated:

At common law, if a party resisted arrest by an officer without warrant and who had no right to arrest him, and if in the course of that resistance the officer was killed, the offense of the party resisting arrest would be reduced from what would have been murder if the officer had had the right to arrest, to manslaughter. What would be murder if the officer had the right to arrest might be reduced to manslaughter by the very fact that he had no such right. So an officer, at common law, was not authorized to make an arrest without a warrant, for a mere misdemeanor not committed in his presence.

The decision of the lower court was reversed and the case remanded for either a new trial or dismissal. (Note: Bad Elk died in jail, awaiting retrial on the murder charges.) Bad Elk died in prison on August 2, 1900, while awaiting a retrial.

== Subsequent developments ==
=== Scholarly response ===
The first response to the common law rule appeared in 1924, when it was questioned in a law review note which advocated abrogating the rule. In 1942, Harvard Law professor Sam Bass Warner, in his support of the Uniform Arrest Act, proposed that a citizen had a duty to submit to arrest, legal or not, if he reasonably believed that the arresting individual was a peace officer. Warner's explanations and reasoning appear to have been "accepted without question by subsequent courts..." In 1969, during the height of the Civil Rights Movement, Paul Chevigny of the New York branch of the American Civil Liberties Union (ACLU) responded that an unlawful arrest was a trespass against the person and was not consistent with Warner's explanations.

=== Common and statutory law ===
In the 1960s, courts began to limit the right to resist an unlawful arrest, apparently influenced by Warner and by the Model Penal Code, which had eliminated the right. In 1965, the first court struck down the right in New Jersey.

Although a few states adopted the Uniform Arrest Act, a majority of the states did not. (Note: Rhode Island and New Hampshire adopted the Uniform Arrest Act in 1941.) The Model Penal Code in 1962 eliminated the right to resist an unlawful arrest on two grounds. First, there were better alternative means of resolving the issue; second, resistance would likely result in greater injury to the citizen without preventing the arrest. By 2012, only fourteen states allowed a citizen to resist an unlawful arrest. (Note: The states are Alabama, Georgia, Louisiana, Maryland, Michigan, Mississippi, New Mexico, New York, North Carolina, Pennsylvania, South Carolina, Virginia, West Virginia, and Wyoming.)

The case also received negative treatment in subsequent Supreme Court cases, from Carroll v. United States in 1925, on arrests and vehicle searches, to Atwater v. City of Lago Vista in 2001, holding that an arrest without a warrant, even for a misdemeanor, is lawful when authorized by statute.

=== Internet meme and myths ===
The case has also been cited on various internet sites as giving citizens the authority to resist unlawful arrest. This claim is normally put forth in connection with a misquoted version of Plummer v. State. One version is:

Citizens may resist unlawful arrest to the point of taking an arresting officer's life if necessary.” Plummer v. State, 136 Ind. 306 [sic]. This premise was upheld by the Supreme Court of the United States in the case: John Bad Elk v. U.S., 177 U.S. 529. The Court stated: “Where the officer is killed in the course of the disorder which naturally accompanies an attempted arrest that is resisted, the law looks with very different eyes upon the transaction, when the officer had the right to make the arrest, from what it does if the officer had no right. What may be murder in the first case might be nothing more than manslaughter in the other, or the facts might show that no offense had been committed.

Modern sources citing Plummer and Bad Elk have tended to discuss the issue as defense against unlawful force; under contemporary law in most jurisdictions, a person may not use force to resist an unlawful arrest. The Plummer quote has been noted to be a fabrication, not appearing in the text of the opinion.
