= Mayor of Opa-locka =

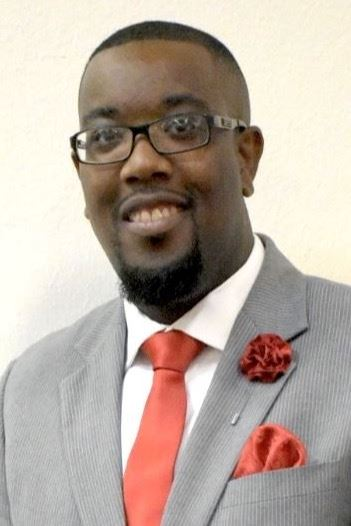
- Incumbent; John Taylor since 2022
- Term length: 4 years
- Formation: 1926

The Mayor of the City of Opa-locka is the official head of the city of Opa-locka in the U.S. state of Florida.

In the November 2002 election, voters approved extending the term of the mayor from two to four years.

== Mayors of Opa-Locka ==
Image	Mayor	Years of service	Notes	Citation
	?	1960–1962		
	?	1962–1964		
	?	1964–1966		
	Kenton N. Wells	1966–1968		
	Robert J. Anderson	1968–1970		
	Kenton N. Wells	1970–1972		
	Ronald Pierson	1972–1974		
	Kenton N. Wells	1974–1975*	*Wells tied with Albert Tresvant in the general election and they decided to split the two-year term with Wells serving the first year.	
	Albert Tresvant	1975–1976*	First African-American mayor of Opa-locka; *Tresvant tied with Kenton Wells in the general election and they decided to split the two-year term with Wells serving the first year.	
	Candido Giardino	1976–1977	Resigned in June 1977 after suspension by Governor Rubin Askew over corruption charges	
	C. William Hartman	1977–1978	Acting mayor	
	Willie Young (mayor)	1978–1980		
	Willie Logan	1980–1982		
	Helen L. Miller	1982–1984	First female African-American mayor in the state of Florida and the first female mayor of Opa-locka	
	John Riley	1984–1986		
	Robert B. Ingram	1986–1998	First directly elected African-American mayor of Opa-locka Choose to not run for re-election in 1998 in order to run for the school board of Miami-Dade County	
	Alvin L. Miller	1998–2002	Son of former mayor Helen L. Miller	
	Myra L. Taylor	2002–2004	First mayor elected to a 4-year term. Removed from office in 2004 by governor Jeb Bush after being indicted for defrauding the Internal Revenue Service later pleading guilty to a misdemeanor of failing to promptly file her taxes	
	Joseph L. Kelley	2004–2010	Finished term of Myra L. Taylor after special election in September 2004 then elected to a 4-year term in 2006	
	Myra L. Taylor	2010–2018		
	Matthew Pigatt	2018–2021	Resigned November 10, 2021	
	Veronica Williams	2021–2022	As the elected Vice Mayor, she filled the vacancy created by the resignation of Matthew Pigatt.	
	John H. Taylor, Jr.	2022–present	John H. Taylor, Jr. was elected to the City of Opa-locka Commission in 2020, was appointed Vice Mayor in 2021 and was elected as Mayor in 2022.	
