= Plummer v. State =

1893 court case decided by the Supreme Court of Indiana

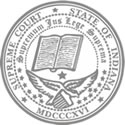
- Seal of the Indiana Supreme Court
- Court: Supreme Court of Indiana
- Full case name: Jackson Plummer v. State of Indiana
- Decided: October 10, 1893
- Citation: 135 Ind. 308, 34 N.E. 968

Case opinions
- Decision by: McCabe, CJ

Plummer v. State was an 1893 court case decided by the Indiana Supreme Court. The case overturned a manslaughter conviction, ruling that the convicted defendant had been protecting himself from the illegal use of force by a police officer. It is widely quoted on the internet, that it gives citizens the right to resist an unlawful arrest by force, including deadly force. The full citation is Plummer v. State, 135 Ind. 308, 34 N.E. 968 (1893).

== Background ==
=== Offense ===
On June 20, 1892, Jackson Plummer, a 60-year-old man in ill health, left his home with his handgun and went looking for members of the town board of Kentland, Indiana. The board had ordered Plummer to trim his trees and he objected. Plummer came into contact with John Keefe and a man named Elliott, and Keefe told Plummer to go home, the board was not going to cut down his trees. Plummer started walking home, but not before he had pointed the pistol at Elliott and a board member named Conklin, and had threatened the town marshal, if he were to show up. James Dorn, who was the marshal of the town, then arrived. Dorn struck Plummer with a billy club and then shot at him with a revolver without first informing Plummer of any intention to arrest him. Before Dorn struck and shot at Plummer, Plummer had not resisted or behaved violently; he had walked toward his home with a revolver in his hand and told the officer to keep away. Dorn and Plummer exchanged gunshots, each hitting the other and Dorn died from the gunshot wound.

=== Lower court ===
A Newton County grand jury indicted Plummer for manslaughter and after a change of venue, he was tried in Benton County before Judge U.Z. Wiley. Plummer was convicted of manslaughter after Wiley gave jury instructions. Plummer was sentenced to fifteen years in prison, and appealed.

== Opinion of the court ==
Chief Justice James McCabe delivered the opinion of the court on October 10, 1893. McCabe noted that Dorn may or may not have held the authority to make a warrantless arrest of Plummer. The offense that Plummer committed was a misdemeanor and for Dorn to have legal authority to make that arrest, the offense must have been committed in Dorn's presence. The state cited legal authority to support that it was in his presence, and McCabe said that for the purpose of the opinion, the court would assume that Dorn had the authority to make the arrest. McCabe stated that an officer, in effecting an arrest, is allowed to use force, but only that force that is necessary. He then noted that by striking Plummer with a nightstick before telling Plummer he was under arrest, Dorn had committed a battery by the use of excessive force. Plummer was then entitled to defend himself, and when Dorn shot at Plummer, Plummer had "a clear right to defend himself, even to the taking the life of his assailant." The court held, that by not giving adequate self-defense instructions to the jury, the trial court erred and the conviction was reversed.

== Subsequent developments ==
=== Citing cases ===
Wilson v. State discusses Plummer, depicting it as saying that it applies to the situation where the arresting officer is using excessive force such that unless the arrestee defends himself or flees, he is likely to suffer great bodily harm or death. The Wilson court was careful to note that a person may not resist an unlawful arrest where the officer does not use unlawful force. Other cases citing Plummer likewise noted that while a person may defend himself against an officer's unlawful use of force, they may not resist an unlawful arrest being made peaceably and without excessive force. In 1995, the Seventh Circuit Court cited Plummer, noting that the privilege exists "not because its use is necessary to protect him from an unlawful arrest, but because it is the only way in which he can protect himself from death or serious bodily harm."

=== Internet meme ===
Plummer v. State, along with Bad Elk v. United States, is cited in Internet blogs and discussion groups but often misquoted. The misquote is that "citizens may resist unlawful arrest to the point of taking an arresting officer's life if necessary" although the Plummer quotation is a fabrication because the quoted text does not appear in the text of the Plummer opinion.

Modern sources describe Plummer and Bad Elk as applying when there is an unlawful use of force rather than when there is an unlawful arrest; under contemporary law in the majority of U.S. jurisdictions, a person may not use force to resist an unlawful arrest.

== See also ==
- Internet meme
- Resisting arrest
- Self-defense (United States)
- Bad Elk v. United States
