= List of United States Supreme Court cases, volume 177 =

Supreme Court of the United States
- Interactive map of Supreme Court of the United States
- 38°53′26″N 77°00′16″W
- Established: March 4, 1789; 236 years ago
- Location: Washington, D.C.
- Coordinates: 38°53′26″N 77°00′16″W
- Composition method: Presidential nomination with Senate confirmation
- Authorised by: Constitution of the United States, Art. III, § 1
- Judge term length: life tenure, subject to impeachment and removal
- Number of positions: 9 (by statute)
- Website: supremecourt.gov

This is a list of cases reported in volume 177 of United States Reports, decided by the Supreme Court of the United States in 1900.

== Justices of the Supreme Court at the time of volume 177 U.S. ==
The Supreme Court is established by Article III, Section 1 of the Constitution of the United States, which says: "The judicial Power of the United States, shall be vested in one supreme Court . . .". The size of the Court is not specified; the Constitution leaves it to Congress to set the number of justices. Under the Judiciary Act of 1789 Congress originally fixed the number of justices at six (one chief justice and five associate justices). Since 1789 Congress has varied the size of the Court from six to seven, nine, ten, and back to nine justices (always including one chief justice).

When the cases in volume 177 were decided the Court comprised the following nine members:

Portrait	Justice	Office	Home State	Succeeded	Date confirmed by the Senate (Vote)	Tenure on Supreme Court
	Melville Fuller	Chief Justice	Illinois	Morrison Waite	July 20, 1888 (41–20)	October 8, 1888 – July 4, 1910 (Died)
	John Marshall Harlan	Associate Justice	Kentucky	David Davis	November 29, 1877 (Acclamation)	December 10, 1877 – October 14, 1911 (Died)
	Horace Gray	Associate Justice	Massachusetts	Nathan Clifford	December 20, 1881 (51–5)	January 9, 1882 – September 15, 1902 (Died)
	David Josiah Brewer	Associate Justice	Kansas	Stanley Matthews	December 18, 1889 (53–11)	January 6, 1890 – March 28, 1910 (Died)
	Henry Billings Brown	Associate Justice	Michigan	Samuel Freeman Miller	December 29, 1890 (Acclamation)	January 5, 1891 – May 28, 1906 (Retired)
	George Shiras Jr.	Associate Justice	Pennsylvania	Joseph P. Bradley	July 26, 1892 (Acclamation)	October 10, 1892 – February 23, 1903 (Retired)
	Edward Douglass White	Associate Justice	Louisiana	Samuel Blatchford	February 19, 1894 (Acclamation)	March 12, 1894 – December 18, 1910 (Continued as chief justice)
	Rufus W. Peckham	Associate Justice	New York	Howell Edmunds Jackson	December 9, 1895 (Acclamation)	January 6, 1896 – October 24, 1909 (Died)
	Joseph McKenna	Associate Justice	California	Stephen Johnson Field	January 21, 1898 (Acclamation)	January 26, 1898 – January 5, 1925 (Retired)

== Citation style ==
Under the Judiciary Act of 1789 the federal court structure at the time comprised District Courts, which had general trial jurisdiction; Circuit Courts, which had mixed trial and appellate (from the US District Courts) jurisdiction; and the United States Supreme Court, which had appellate jurisdiction over the federal District and Circuit courts—and for certain issues over state courts. The Supreme Court also had limited original jurisdiction (i.e., in which cases could be filed directly with the Supreme Court without first having been heard by a lower federal or state court). There were one or more federal District Courts and/or Circuit Courts in each state, territory, or other geographical region.

The Judiciary Act of 1891 created the United States Courts of Appeals and reassigned the jurisdiction of most routine appeals from the district and circuit courts to these appellate courts. The Act created nine new courts that were originally known as the "United States Circuit Courts of Appeals." The new courts had jurisdiction over most appeals of lower court decisions. The Supreme Court could review either legal issues that a court of appeals certified or decisions of court of appeals by writ of certiorari.

Bluebook citation style is used for case names, citations, and jurisdictions.

- "# Cir." = United States Court of Appeals
  - e.g., "3d Cir." = United States Court of Appeals for the Third Circuit
- "C.C.D." = United States Circuit Court for the District of . . .
  - e.g.,"C.C.D.N.J." = United States Circuit Court for the District of New Jersey
- "D." = United States District Court for the District of . . .
  - e.g.,"D. Mass." = United States District Court for the District of Massachusetts
- "E." = Eastern; "M." = Middle; "N." = Northern; "S." = Southern; "W." = Western
  - e.g.,"C.C.S.D.N.Y." = United States Circuit Court for the Southern District of New York
  - e.g.,"M.D. Ala." = United States District Court for the Middle District of Alabama
- "Ct. Cl." = United States Court of Claims
- The abbreviation of a state's name alone indicates the highest appellate court in that state's judiciary at the time.
  - e.g.,"Pa." = Supreme Court of Pennsylvania
  - e.g.,"Me." = Supreme Judicial Court of Maine

== List of cases in volume 177 U.S. ==
Case Name	Page and year	Opinion of the Court	Concurring opinion(s)	Dissenting opinion(s)	Lower Court	Disposition
Jellenik v. Huron Copper Mining Company	1 (1900)	Harlan	none	none	C.C.W.D. Mich.	reversed
Thorp v. Bonnifield	15 (1900)	Peckham	none	none	9th Cir.	dismissed
Quackenbush v. United States	20 (1900)	Fuller	none	none	Ct. Cl.	affirmed
Waters Pierce Oil Company v. Texas	28 (1900)	McKenna	none	none	Tex. Civ. App.	affirmed
In re Grossmayer	48 (1900)	Gray	none	none	E.D. Tex.	mandamus denied
Farmers' Loan and Trust Company v. Lake Street Elevated Railroad Company	51 (1900)	Shiras	none	none	Ill.	reversed
Carmichael v. Eberle	63 (1900)	Fuller	none	none	Sup. Ct. Terr. N.M.	dismissed
Houston and Texas Central Railway Company v. Texas	66 (1900)	Peckham	Brown	none	Tex. Civ. App.	reversed
Galveston, Harrisburg and San Antonio Railway Company v. Texas	103 (1900)	per curiam	none	none	Tex. Civ. App.	reversed
United States v. Elder	104 (1900)	White	none	none	Ct. Priv. Land Cl.	reversed
Jamestown and Northern Railroad Company v. Jones	125 (1900)	McKenna	none	none	N.D.	reversed
Bristol v. Washington County	133 (1900)	Fuller	none	none	C.C.D. Minn.	reversed
Union Refrigerator Transit Line Company v. Lynch	149 (1900)	Fuller	none	none	Utah	affirmed
Murphy v. Massachusetts	155 (1900)	Fuller	none	none	Mass. Super. Ct.	affirmed
Petit v. Minnesota	164 (1900)	Fuller	none	none	Minn.	affirmed
Crystal Springs Land and Water Company v. City of Los Angeles	169 (1900)	Fuller	none	none	C.C.S.D. Cal.	affirmed
Camden and Suburban Railway Company v. Stetson	172 (1900)	Peckham	none	none	3d Cir.	certification
Forsyth v. Vehmeyer	177 (1900)	Peckham	none	none	Ill.	affirmed
Gundling v. City of Chicago	183 (1900)	Peckham	none	none	Ill.	affirmed
Ohio Oil Company v. Indiana I	190 (1900)	White	none	none	Ind.	affirmed
Ohio Oil Company v. Indiana II	212 (1900)	White	none	none	Ind.	affirmed
Ohio Oil Company v. Indiana III	213 (1900)	White	none	none	Ind.	affirmed
Overby v. Gordon	214 (1900)	White	none	none	D.C. Cir.	affirmed
Louisville and Nashville Railroad Company v. Schmidt	230 (1900)	White	none	none	Ky.	affirmed
The Albert Dumois	240 (1900)	Brown	none	none	5th Cir.	affirmed
Knights of Pythias v. Withers	260 (1900)	Brown	none	none	5th Cir.	affirmed
Arnold v. Hatch	276 (1900)	Brown	none	none	7th Cir.	affirmed
Hyde v. Bishop Iron Company	281 (1900)	Brewer	none	none	Minn.	affirmed
Keim v. United States	290 (1900)	Brewer	none	none	Ct. Cl.	affirmed
Consolidated Canal Company v. Mesa Canal Company	296 (1900)	Brewer	none	none	Sup. Ct. Terr. Ariz.	affirmed
United States v. Harris	305 (1900)	Shiras	none	none	3d Cir.	affirmed
Credits Commutation Company v. United States	311 (1900)	Shiras	none	none	8th Cir.	affirmed
Saranac Land and Timber Company v. Comptroller	318 (1900)	McKenna	none	none	C.C.N.D.N.Y.	affirmed
Minneapolis and St. Louis Railway Company v. Gardner	332 (1900)	McKenna	none	none	Minn.	affirmed
Caffrey v. Oklahoma	346 (1900)	McKenna	none	none	Sup. Ct. Terr. Okla.	dismissed
Black v. Jackson	349 (1900)	Harlan	none	none	Sup. Ct. Terr. Okla.	reversed
Potts v. Hollon	365 (1900)	Harlan	none	none	Sup. Ct. Terr. Okla.	reversed
Wesley v. Eells	370 (1900)	Harlan	none	none	C.C.N.D. Ohio	affirmed
Ex parte Baez	378 (1900)	Fuller	none	none	Provisional Ct. P.R.	habeas corpus denied
Werlein v. City of New Orleans	390 (1900)	Peckham	none	none	La.	reversed
American Express Company v. Michigan	404 (1900)	White	none	Harlan	Mich.	reversed
Crawford v. Hubbell	419 (1900)	White	none	none	2d Cir.	certification
Doherty v. Northern Pacific Railroad Company	421 (1900)	Shiras	none	none	Wis.	affirmed
United States v. Northern Pacific Railroad Company	435 (1900)	Shiras	none	none	8th Cir.	affirmed
Carter v. Texas	442 (1900)	Gray	none	none	Tex. Crim. App.	reversed
Great Southern Fire Proof Hotel Company v. Jones	449 (1900)	Harlan	none	none	6th Cir.	reversed
Boske v. Comingore	459 (1900)	Harlan	none	none	D. Ky.	affirmed
Adams v. Cowen	471 (1900)	Brewer	none	none	6th Cir.	affirmed
Mast Foos and Company v. Stover Manufacturing Company	485 (1900)	Brown	none	none	7th Cir.	affirmed
Carter v. Roberts	496 (1900)	Fuller	none	none	C.C.S.D.N.Y.	dismissed
Tennessee v. Virginia	501 (1900)	Fuller	none	none	original	boundary set
Shoshone Mining Company v. Rutter	505 (1900)	Brewer	none	none	9th Cir.	reversed
Cleveland, Cincinnati, Chicago and St. Louis Railway Company v. Illinois	514 (1900)	Brown	Brewer	none	Ill.	reversed
De Lamar's Nevada Gold Mining Company v. Nesbitt	523 (1900)	Brown	none	none	Nev.	dismissed
Bad Elk v. United States	529 (1900)	Peckham	none	none	C.C.D.S.D.	reversed
Apache County v. Barth	538 (1900)	Peckham	none	none	Sup. Ct. Terr. Ariz.	reversed
Daggs v. Phoenix National Bank	549 (1900)	McKenna	none	none	Sup. Ct. Terr. Ariz.	affirmed
City of Los Angeles v. Los Angeles City Water Company	558 (1900)	McKenna	none	none	C.C.S.D. Cal.	affirmed
Erb v. Morasch	584 (1900)	Brewer	none	none	Kan.	affirmed
L'Hote v. City of New Orleans	587 (1900)	Brewer	none	none	La.	affirmed
Williams v. Wingo	601 (1900)	Brewer	none	none	Va.	affirmed
Chamberlin v. Browning	605 (1900)	White	none	none	D.C. Cir.	dismissed
Howard v. De Cordova	609 (1900)	White	none	none	C.C.N.D. Tex.	reversed
Cincinnati, Hamilton and Dayton Railway Company v. Thiebaud	615 (1900)	Fuller	none	none	6th Cir.	certification
Leovy v. United States	621 (1900)	Shiras	none	none	5th Cir.	reversed
Knapp Stout and Company v. McCaffrey	638 (1900)	Brown	none	none	Ill.	affirmed
Bryar v. Campbell	649 (1900)	Brown	none	none	3d Cir.	affirmed
The Carlos F. Roses	655 (1900)	Fuller	none	Shiras	S.D. Fla.	reversed

== See also ==
- Certificate of division
