= Beryl Roberts =

American politician

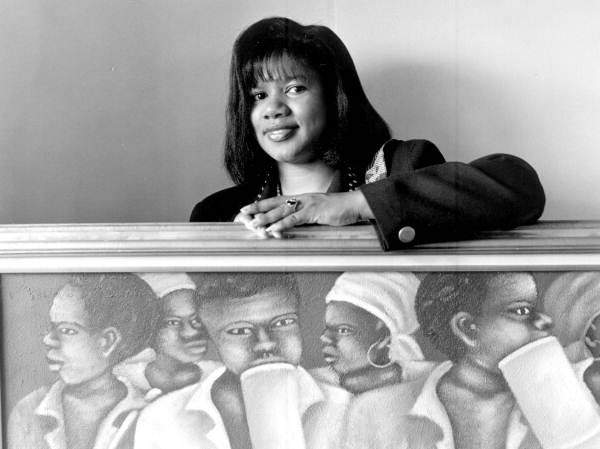
- Roberts in 1992

Member of the Florida House of Representatives from the 108th district
- In office 1992–2000

Personal details
- Born: August 26, 1958 (age 67) Columbia, South Carolina, U.S.
- Party: Democratic
- Education: Florida State University (BS, JD)
- Profession: Attorney

Beryl D. Roberts (born August 26, 1958) is an American politician in the state of Florida.

== Early life and education ==
Robers was born in Columbia, South Carolina. She earned a Bachelor of Science degree from Florida State University and a Juris Doctor from the Florida State University College of Law.

== Career ==
Outside of politics, Roberts has worked as an attorney. She was elected to the Florida House of Representatives in 1992 and served until 2000.
