= Wilbert Holloway =

American politician (born 1948)

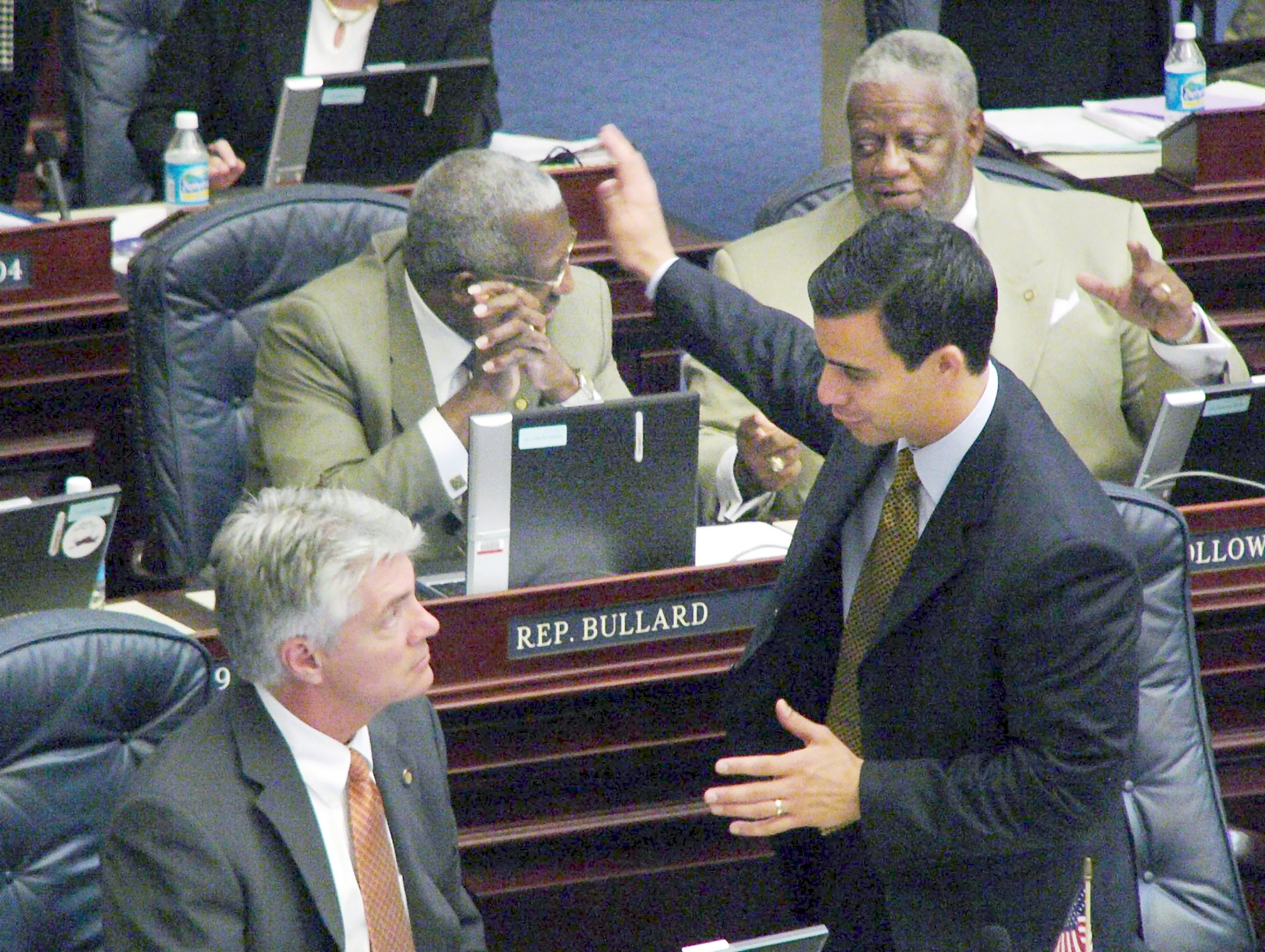
- Florida state representatives including Edward B. Bullard and Wilbert Holloway conferring in background

Member of the Florida House of Representatives
- In office 2001–2007

Personal details
- Born: Wilbert Theodore Holloway; August 3, 1948 (age 77) Miami, Florida, U.S.
- Party: Democratic
- Spouse: Linda Hodges
- Children: 4
- Education: Miami Northwestern Senior High School; Bethune–Cookman University (BBA)
- Occupation: Politician

Wilbert "Tee" Theodore Holloway (born August 3, 1948) is a former member of the Miami-Dade County School Board and a former member of the Florida House of Representatives. He was appointed to the Miami-Dade County School Board by then-Governor Charlie Crist in 2007.

He was born in Miami and graduated from Miami Northwestern Senior High School in 1966. He has a B.S. in Business Administration from Bethune-Cookman University. He married Linda Hodges and has four children. He served in the Florida House from 2001 until 2007. He is Baptist. Florida Memory has a photo of him with Will Kendrick on the House floor in 2007.
