= Opa-locka, Florida =

Opa-locka, Florida Opa-tisha-wocka-locka (Seminole)
- City
- City of Opa-locka
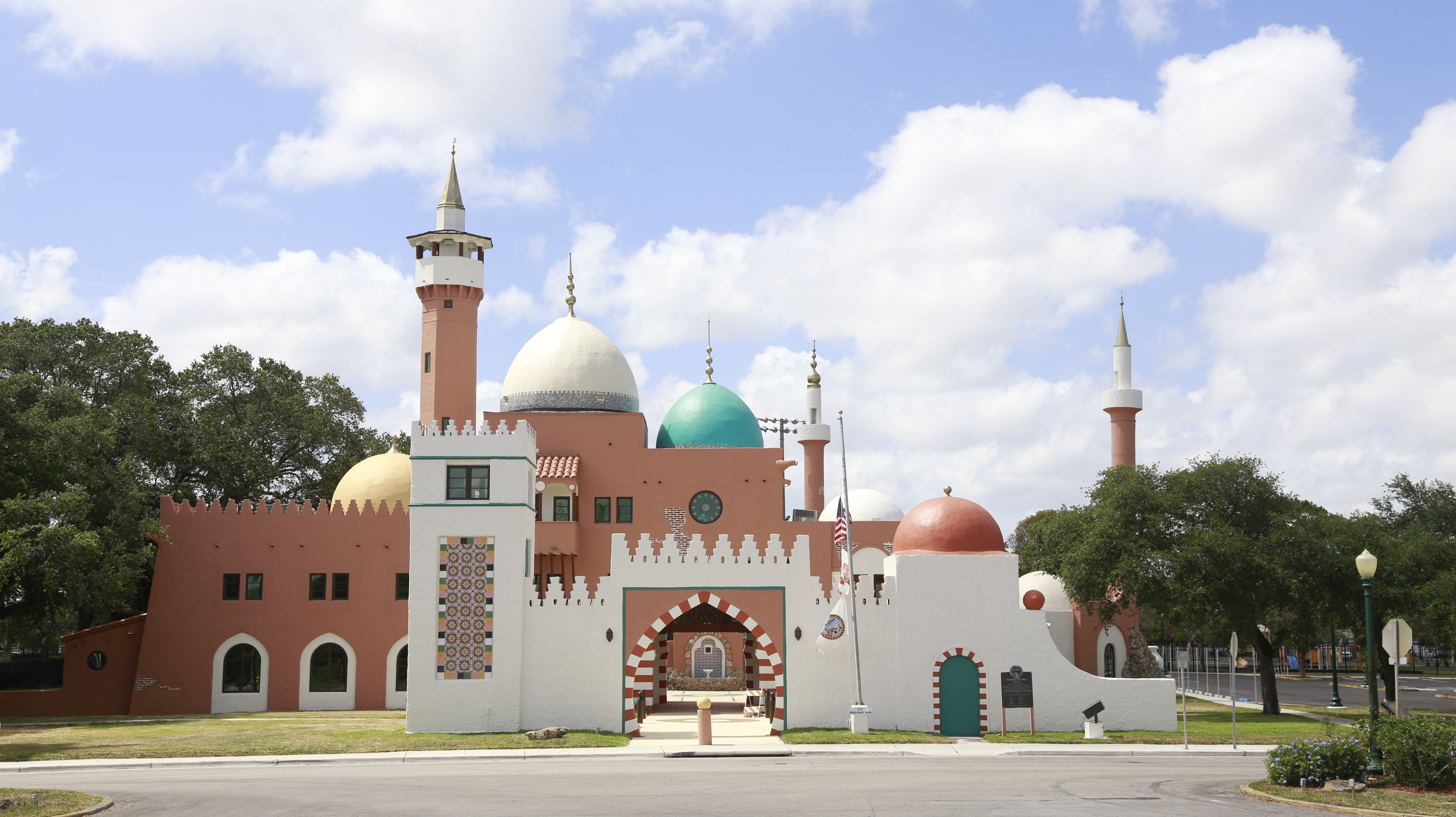
- Historic Opa-locka City Hall

- Seal
- Motto: The City of Bright Opportunities
- Location in Miami-Dade County and the state of Florida

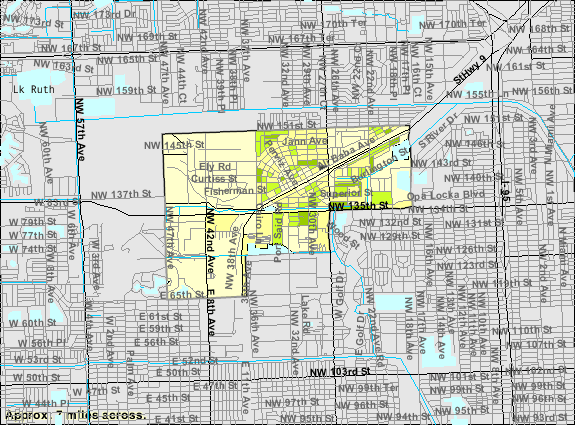
- U.S. Census Bureau map showing city limits
- Coordinates: 25°54′06″N 80°14′43″W
- Country: United States
- State: Florida
- County: Miami-Dade
- Incorporated: May 14, 1926

Government
  - Type: Council-Manager

Area
  - Total: 4.48 sq mi (11.61 km^{2})
  - Land: 4.31 sq mi (11.16 km^{2})
  - Water: 0.17 sq mi (0.45 km^{2}) 3.13%
- Elevation: 7 ft (2.1 m)

Population (2020)
  - Total: 16,463
  - Density: 3,822/sq mi (1,475.6/km^{2})
- Time zone: UTC−5 (EST)
  - Summer (DST): UTC−4 (EDT)
- ZIP Codes: 33054, 33014 (Hialeah)
- Area codes: 305, 786, 645
- FIPS code: 12-51650
- GNIS feature ID: 2404434
- Website: www.opalockafl.gov

Opa-locka is a city in Miami-Dade County, Florida, United States. Spanning roughly 4.2 square miles (11 km^{2}), it is part of the Miami metropolitan area of South Florida. As of the 2020 Census, the population was 16,463, up from 15,219 in 2010.

Opa-locka was founded in 1926 by American aviator and industrialist Glenn Curtiss, who was inspired by the Middle Eastern folk tales of the One Thousand and One Nights. As such, the city is noted as having one of the largest collection of Moorish Revival architecture in the Western Hemisphere, and many of its roads bear names such as Sharazad Boulevard, Sinbad Avenue, Sabur Lane, Sultan Avenue, Ali Baba Avenue, Perviz Avenue, and Sesame Street.

The name Opa-locka is an abbreviation of a Seminole place name, Opa-tisha-wocka-locka, meaning "wooded hummock", "high, dry hummock", or "a big island covered with many trees and swamps".

== History ==
Opa-locka was founded in 1926 by aviation pioneer Glenn Curtiss, who had retired to become a real estate developer during the nascent Florida land boom. The city's unique "Arabian" or "Moorish" architectural theme was executed by American architect Bernhardt E. Muller, who had designed several Mediterranean and Spanish-style homes in nearby Miami in 1923. There are various accounts regarding how Opa-locka came to adopt its iconic architectural style. Curtiss had met Muller in 1925 at the suggestion of Curtiss' mother, Lua Andrews Curtiss. Muller is said to have viewed Opa-locka as an opportunity to create a new community based on an architectural theme from a literary work; he was particularly inspired by the exoticism and splendor of the One Thousand and One Nights, also known in English as the Arabian Nights. By some accounts, Muller met with Curtiss on the site of the future city to describe his concept for an architectural design inspired by individual stories of the Arabian Nights; other sources indicate that Curtiss was inspired by his own reading of Arabian Nights, or by the 1924 film The Thief of Baghdad, which was adapted from the story.

Opa-locka's overall design and layout was conceived by New York planner and architect Clinton McKenzie, who drew heavily from the contemporary "Garden City Movement", which called for satellite communities centered on residences, industry, and agriculture but connected to a central hub and interspersed with greenbelts. Opa-locka became a self-contained community with a hotel, zoo park, golf course, archery club, swimming pool, airport, and train station. On May 14, 1926, it was officially chartered as a town by 28 registered voters, although much of it remained under construction.

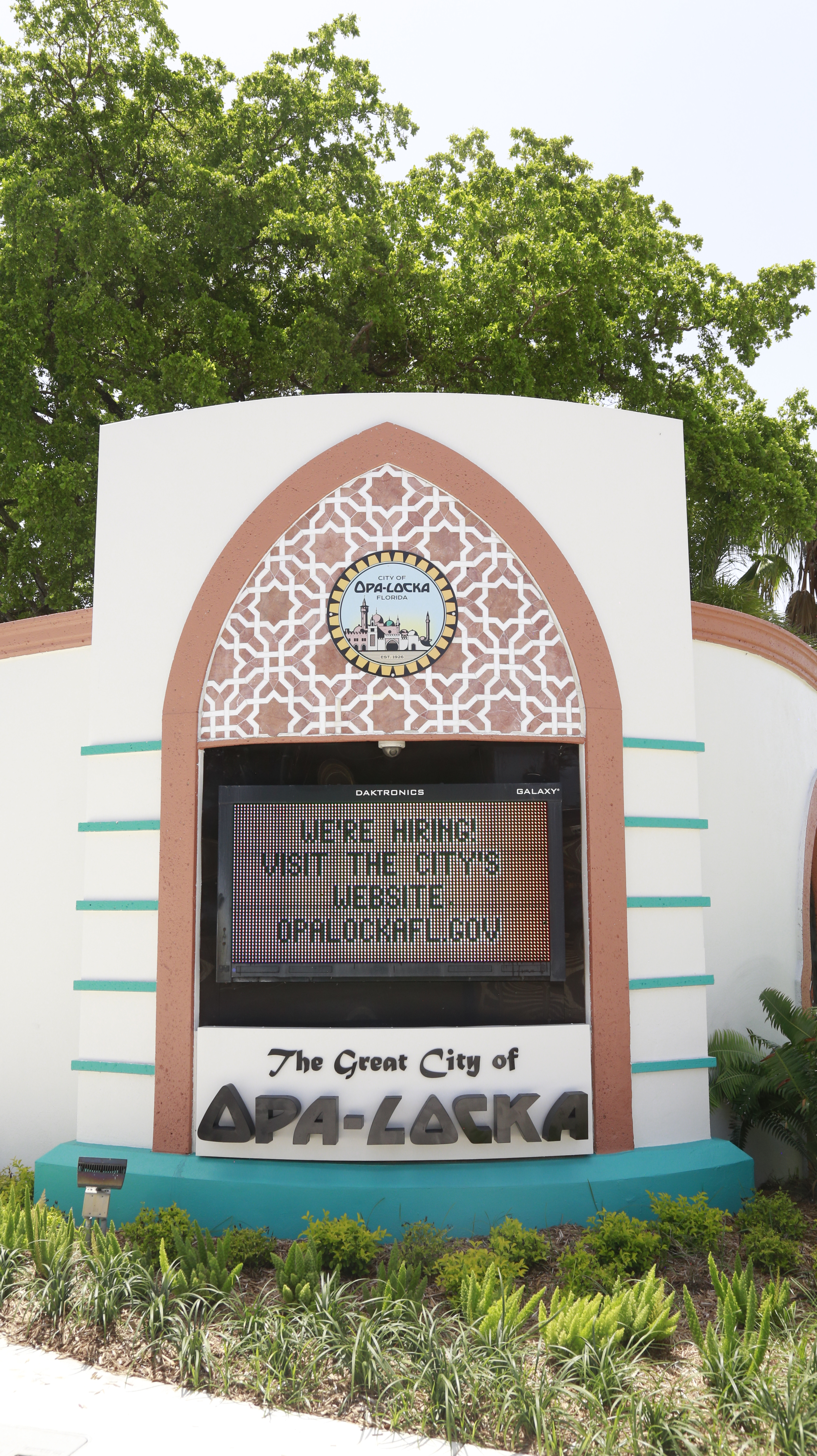
Opa-locka City Gateway at 27th Ave. and Opa-locka Blvd.

Opa-locka was largely spared by the Great Miami hurricane that devastated much of South Florida in September 1926. While the storm ended the Florida land boom and reduced the influx of residents and capital, the town continued to develop; by the end of the year, at least 62 buildings were complete and another 31 were under construction. Ultimately, a total of 86 to 105 buildings were built in the "Neo-Moorish" or Moorish Revival style that had first emerged in Europe and North America in the late 19th century; common characteristics included onion-shaped domes, minarets, crenelated parapets, Saracenic arches, watchtowers, mosaic tile, and outdoor spiral staircases. Several Moorish-style buildings have survived, of which twenty are listed on the National Register of Historic Places as part of the Opa-locka Thematic Resource Area.

On January 8, 1927, as part of an effort to drive growth and generate interest, Opa-locka held its inaugural "Arabian Nights Fantasy", which included dignitaries such as Florida Governor John Martin. Many residents dressed in Arabian-styled theatrical costumes shipped down from New York. The festivities also marked the opening of Opa-locka train station—billed as the "grand Vizier of the Sheikdom of Opa-locka"—and the inaugural run of the Seaboard Airline Railroad's famous "Orange Blossom Special", a deluxe passenger train that would run from New York to Miami in winter. Though largely promotional in its origins, the Arabian Nights Fantasy has since become an annual event centered on promoting civic pride and community.

In 1933, the U.S. Navy opened a base at the Opa-locka Airport, which helped drive the city's growth. With the closure of the base in the 1950s, Opa-locka experienced a decline.

In the 1980s, Opa-locka transitioned from majority white to majority African American and was seen as a pioneer in black empowerment in northern Dade County, where neighboring cities (North Miami, North Miami Beach, Miami Gardens, and Golden Glades) were undergoing a similar racial shift. In 1943, Opa-Locka hired its first black police officer. In 1972, the first black city commissioner was elected, Albert Tresvant, who then went on to serve as the first black mayor of Opa-Locka in 1975.

Opa-locka was the first community in the United States to commemorate the election of Barack Obama as the country's first African American president. A mile-long section of Perviz Avenue—from Oriental Boulevard to Ali Baba Avenue—was renamed "Barack Obama Avenue" on February 17, 2009.

In addition to the unique buildings, Opa-locka has a large general aviation airport, three parks, two lakes and a railroad station which is currently the tri-rail station. The city is a mixture of residential, commercial and industrial zones. Opa-locka was the backdrop for several films, including Salesman, Living Dreams, Texas Justice, Bad Boys II, and 2 Fast 2 Furious.

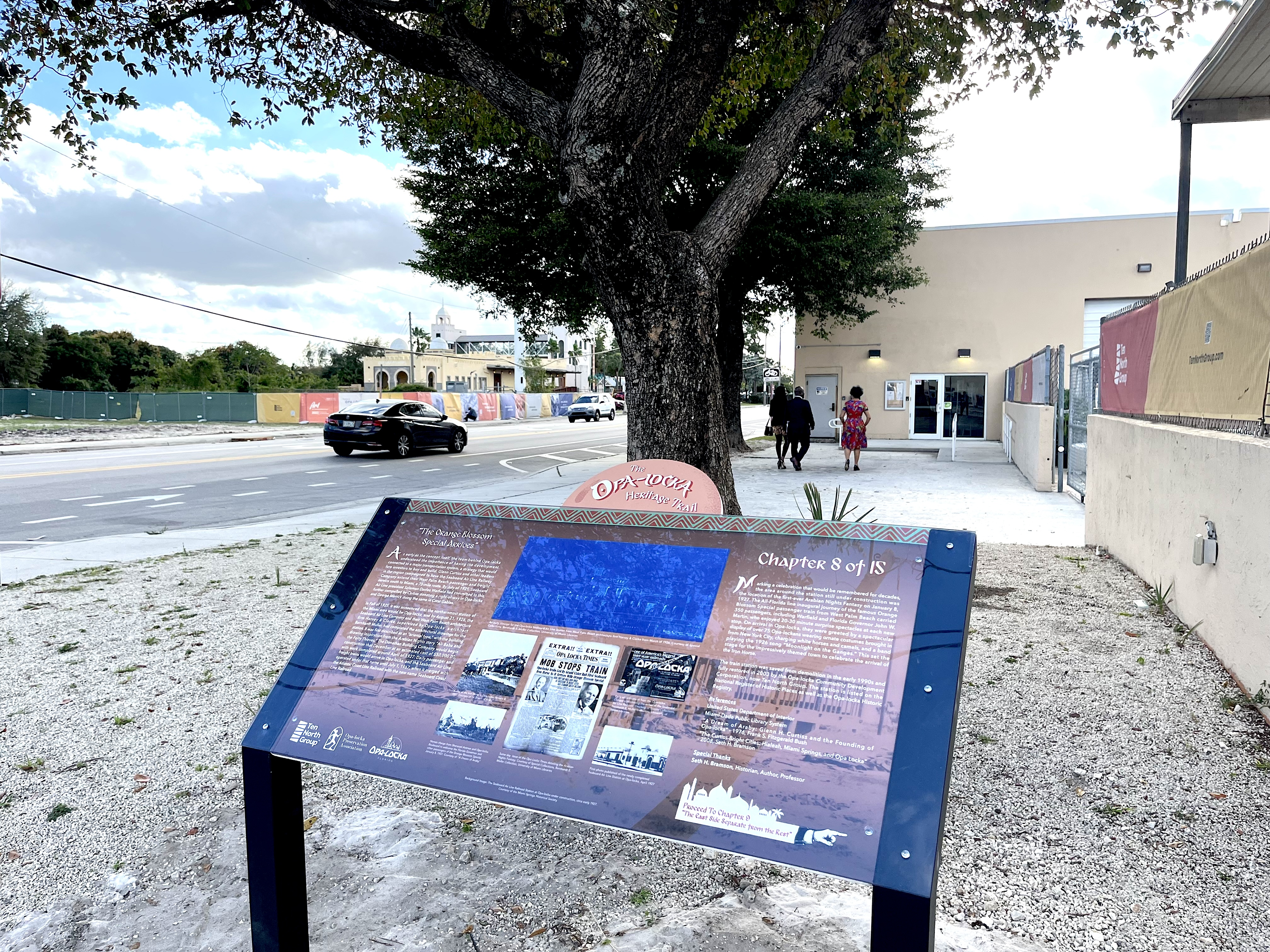
Chapter 8 of the Opa-locka Heritage Trail in Downtown

=== 2016 financial emergency ===
On June 1, 2016, then-Florida Governor Rick Scott issued Executive Order Number 16-135, declaring the City of Opa-Locka to be in a state of "Financial Emergency" under Florida Statute Section 218.503. According to the Executive Order, the Opa-Locka City Commission requested that the governor declare the financial emergency, the state and the City of Opa-Locka were to execute a State and Local Agreement of Cooperation, and the government would appoint a Financial Emergency Board. On the same day, the Miami Herald reported that "Millions of dollars are in arrears as the city teeters on the edge of bankruptcy" and that "city officials remain under an FBI corruption investigation". The article also reported that this financial emergency was the second declared for the city since 2002.

Just over a week earlier, Opa-locka Commissioner Terence Pinder apparently drove his SUV into a tree at high speed, killing himself. He was scheduled to turn himself over to prosecutors the next day, having faced bribery charges.

On June 10, Rick Scott named the Financial Emergency Board. The City of Opa-locka does not have an Audit Committee to help select the public accountant to perform the independent audited financial statements, as required by Florida Statute 218.391(2)

== Geography ==
Opa-locka is in northern Miami-Dade County, 12 miles (19 km) north of downtown Miami and 7 miles (11 km) west of North Miami Beach. It is bordered to the north by the city of Miami Gardens, to the east by unincorporated Golden Glades, to the south by unincorporated Westview, and to the southwest by the city of Hialeah.

According to the United States Census Bureau, Opa-locka has a total area of 4.5 square miles (12 km^{2}). 4.3 square miles (11 km^{2}) of it are land and 0.2 square miles (0.52 km^{2}) of it (3.90%) are covered by water.

=== Climate ===
Climate data for Opa-locka, Florida (Miami-Opa Locka Executive Airport), 1991–2020 normals, extremes 1998–present
| Month | Jan | Feb | Mar | Apr | May | Jun | Jul | Aug | Sep | Oct | Nov | Dec | Year |
|---|---|---|---|---|---|---|---|---|---|---|---|---|---|
| Record high °F (°C) | 88 (31) | 89 (32) | 92 (33) | 97 (36) | 97 (36) | 98 (37) | 98 (37) | 97 (36) | 96 (36) | 94 (34) | 91 (33) | 91 (33) | 98 (37) |
| Mean maximum °F (°C) | 85.4 (29.7) | 87.1 (30.6) | 89.5 (31.9) | 91.6 (33.1) | 93.0 (33.9) | 94.6 (34.8) | 94.5 (34.7) | 95.1 (35.1) | 93.5 (34.2) | 91.5 (33.1) | 87.2 (30.7) | 86.2 (30.1) | 96.1 (35.6) |
| Mean daily maximum °F (°C) | 76.7 (24.8) | 78.8 (26.0) | 81.2 (27.3) | 84.2 (29.0) | 87.2 (30.7) | 89.7 (32.1) | 90.8 (32.7) | 91.1 (32.8) | 89.5 (31.9) | 86.4 (30.2) | 81.6 (27.6) | 78.5 (25.8) | 84.6 (29.2) |
| Daily mean °F (°C) | 67.8 (19.9) | 70.0 (21.1) | 72.6 (22.6) | 76.1 (24.5) | 79.7 (26.5) | 82.6 (28.1) | 83.6 (28.7) | 84.0 (28.9) | 82.8 (28.2) | 79.8 (26.6) | 74.0 (23.3) | 70.4 (21.3) | 76.9 (24.9) |
| Mean daily minimum °F (°C) | 58.9 (14.9) | 61.2 (16.2) | 64.0 (17.8) | 68.1 (20.1) | 72.1 (22.3) | 75.5 (24.2) | 76.4 (24.7) | 76.8 (24.9) | 76.0 (24.4) | 73.1 (22.8) | 66.5 (19.2) | 62.3 (16.8) | 69.2 (20.7) |
| Mean minimum °F (°C) | 43.5 (6.4) | 47.1 (8.4) | 50.9 (10.5) | 58.3 (14.6) | 64.9 (18.3) | 71.5 (21.9) | 71.9 (22.2) | 72.3 (22.4) | 72.3 (22.4) | 63.3 (17.4) | 53.9 (12.2) | 49.7 (9.8) | 40.9 (4.9) |
| Record low °F (°C) | 33 (1) | 36 (2) | 40 (4) | 50 (10) | 57 (14) | 69 (21) | 69 (21) | 66 (19) | 64 (18) | 53 (12) | 43 (6) | 34 (1) | 33 (1) |
| Average precipitation inches (mm) | 1.81 (46) | 2.66 (68) | 2.51 (64) | 2.94 (75) | 6.05 (154) | 8.92 (227) | 8.13 (207) | 8.08 (205) | 8.71 (221) | 7.78 (198) | 2.89 (73) | 2.17 (55) | 62.65 (1,591) |
| Average precipitation days (≥ 0.01 in) | 8.6 | 7.2 | 7.2 | 6.7 | 11.5 | 17.0 | 18.2 | 18.0 | 17.9 | 12.7 | 9.5 | 9.4 | 143.9 |
Source: NOAA (mean maxima/minima 2006–2020)

=== Surrounding areas ===
Miami Gardens
Miami Lakes Golden Glades
Unincorporated Miami-Dade County Golden Glades
Hialeah North Miami
Hialeah, Westview

== Demographics ==
Historical population
| Census | Pop. | Note | %± |
|---|---|---|---|
| 1930 | 339 | | — |
| 1940 | 497 | | 46.6% |
| 1950 | 5,271 | | 960.6% |
| 1960 | 9,810 | | 86.1% |
| 1970 | 11,902 | | 21.3% |
| 1980 | 14,460 | | 21.5% |
| 1990 | 15,283 | | 5.7% |
| 2000 | 14,951 | | −2.2% |
| 2010 | 15,219 | | 1.8% |
| 2020 | 16,463 | | 8.2% |
U.S. Decennial Census; 2010 2020

=== Racial and ethnic composition ===
Opa-locka city, Florida – Racial and ethnic composition Note: the US Census treats Hispanic/Latino as an ethnic category. This table excludes Latinos from the racial categories and assigns them to a separate category. Hispanics/Latinos may be of any race.
| Race / Ethnicity (NH = Non-Hispanic) | Pop 2000 | Pop 2010 | Pop 2020 | % 2000 | % 2010 | % 2020 |
|---|---|---|---|---|---|---|
| White alone (NH) | 469 | 323 | 317 | 3.14% | 2.12% | 1.93% |
| Black or African American alone (NH) | 9,933 | 9,366 | 11,227 | 66.44% | 61.54% | 67.20% |
| Native American or Alaska Native alone (NH) | 31 | 21 | 15 | 0.21% | 0.14% | 0.09% |
| Asian alone (NH) | 30 | 27 | 40 | 0.20% | 0.18% | 0.24% |
| Native Hawaiian or Pacific Islander alone (NH) | 2 | 1 | 2 | 0.01% | 0.01% | 0.01% |
| Other race alone (NH) | 6 | 21 | 66 | 0.04% | 0.14% | 0.40% |
| Mixed race or Multiracial (NH) | 212 | 82 | 192 | 1.42% | 0.54% | 1.17% |
| Hispanic or Latino (any race) | 4,268 | 5,378 | 4,604 | 28.55% | 35.34% | 27.96% |
| Total | 14,951 | 15,219 | 16,463 | 100.00% | 100.00% | 100.00% |

=== 2020 census ===
As of the 2020 census, Opa-locka had a population of 16,463. The median age was 36.0 years. 25.7% of residents were under the age of 18 and 14.7% of residents were 65 years of age or older. For every 100 females there were 88.6 males, and for every 100 females age 18 and over there were 83.2 males age 18 and over.

100.0% of residents lived in urban areas, while 0.0% lived in rural areas.

There were 5,883 households in Opa-locka, of which 38.2% had children under the age of 18 living in them. Of all households, 24.8% were married-couple households, 21.5% were households with a male householder and no spouse or partner present, and 45.2% were households with a female householder and no spouse or partner present. About 26.9% of all households were made up of individuals and 11.8% had someone living alone who was 65 years of age or older.

There were 6,210 housing units, of which 5.3% were vacant. The homeowner vacancy rate was 1.4% and the rental vacancy rate was 4.1%.

A 2016-2020 ACS estimate reported 3,607 families residing in the city.

=== 2010 census ===
As of the 2010 United States census, there were 15,219 people, 5,843 households, and 3,406 families residing in the city.

=== 2000 census ===
Opa-Locka has a foreign-born population, with a noticeable portion from The Bahamas. In 2000, 33.56% of Opa-locka's Bahamian population was born outside of the United States. Other major West Indians populations are Haitian, Jamaicans, Dominicans, Cubans and smaller amounts.

In 2000, 41.2% had children under the age of 18 living with them, 28.4% were married couples living together, 35.2% had a female householder with no husband present, and 29.7% were non-families. 24.8% of all households were made up of individuals, and 8.5% had someone living alone who was 65 years of age or older. The average household size was 2.97 and the average family size was 3.52.

In 2000, the city's population was distributed as 34.6% under the age of 18, 12.3% from 18 to 24, 26.8% from 25 to 44, 17.7% from 45 to 64, and 8.5% who were 65 years of age or older. The median age was 27 years. For every 100 females, there were 85.6 males. For every 100 females age 18 and over, there were 77.1 males.

In 2000, $25,000 was the median income for a family. Males had a median income of $22,347 versus $19,270 for females. The per capita income for the city is approximately $15,000. About 31.5% of families and 35.2% of the population are below the poverty line, including 42.3% of those under age 18 and 40.8% of those age 65 or over.

As of 2000, speakers of English as a first language accounted for 68.45%, while Spanish made up 28.30%, French Creole 2.78%, and French was at 0.48% of the population.

== Government ==
The city of Opa-locka was incorporated in 1926 and operates under a commission/city manager form of government. The city commission consists of the mayor and four commissioners, who are responsible for enacting ordinances, resolutions, and regulations governing the city, and appointing the members of various advisory boards, the city manager, city attorney, and city clerk. As chief administrative officer, the city manager is responsible for the enforcement of laws and ordinances, and the appointment and supervision of the city's department heads. Municipal services include police, sanitation, water and sewer services, storm water services, maintenance of streets and infrastructure, and recreational activities. The financial reporting entity, under which the financial statements are prepared, includes all the activities and functions for which the city is financially accountable.

The federal government has been investigating the city's government since at least 2013. In 2014, auditors reported that basic bookkeeping was non-existent. The Miami Herald reported the mayor and other officials were using city funds for their own benefit. In 2016, the city manager and public works supervisor were arrested, charged with extortion of money in exchange for city permits. Both quickly pled guilty. The city's water system had been used by city workers as means of collecting money for their own use. In August 2016 the city asked the county to take over the system.

=== Opa-locka Police Department ===
The city is served by the Opa-locka Police Department, located at the Opa-locka Government Center at 740 Fisherman Street. The department has an authorized force of 54 sworn officers and 10 civilian support staff. Since 2022, the chief of police has been Scott Israel, a former Broward County Sheriff who was hired in 2022 to replace acting police chief Michael Steel, who had been in the position since Steve Barreira resigned in late October 2021 after just months on the job. In 2019, Israel In a 2013 editorial, the Miami Herald called the city "crime-plagued" and the police department "deeply troubled". Florida Governor Ron DeSantis suspended Israel from his Broward County position in 2019 (replacing him with Gregory Tony), citing Israel's responses to the Fort Lauderdale airport shooting and the Stoneman Douglas High School shooting.

== Crime ==
In 2004, Opa-locka had one of the highest homicide rates in the United States. The city has consistently experienced a high violent crime rate, particularly homicides with reports of frequently citing it as one of the most dangerous cities in the U.S.

Opa-locka crime statistics reported an overall downward trend in crime based on data from 12 years, with both violent crime and property crime decreasing.

== Education ==
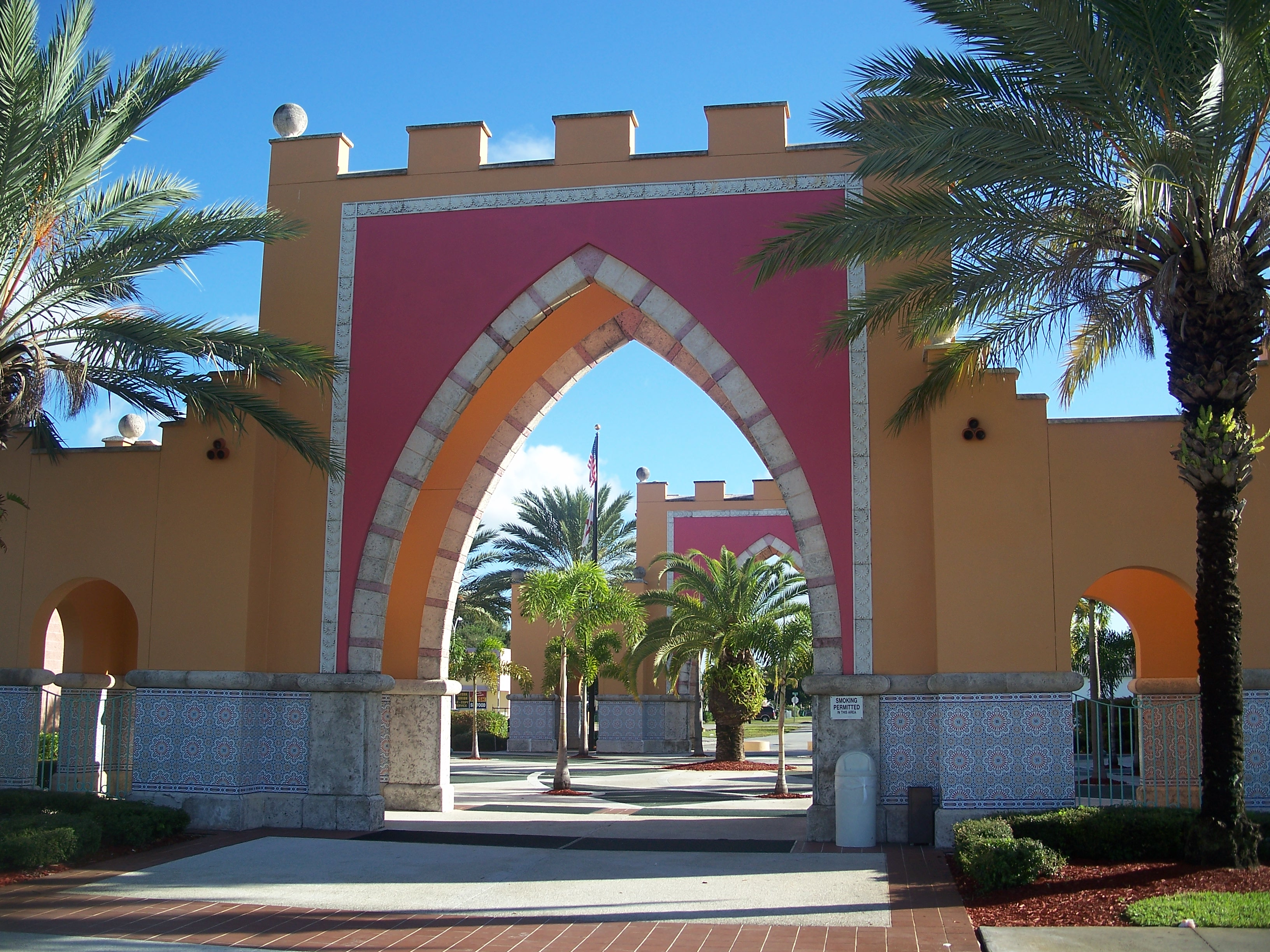
Central Courtyard to the Opa-locka Regional Service Center in a modern Moorish-Egyptian Revival style

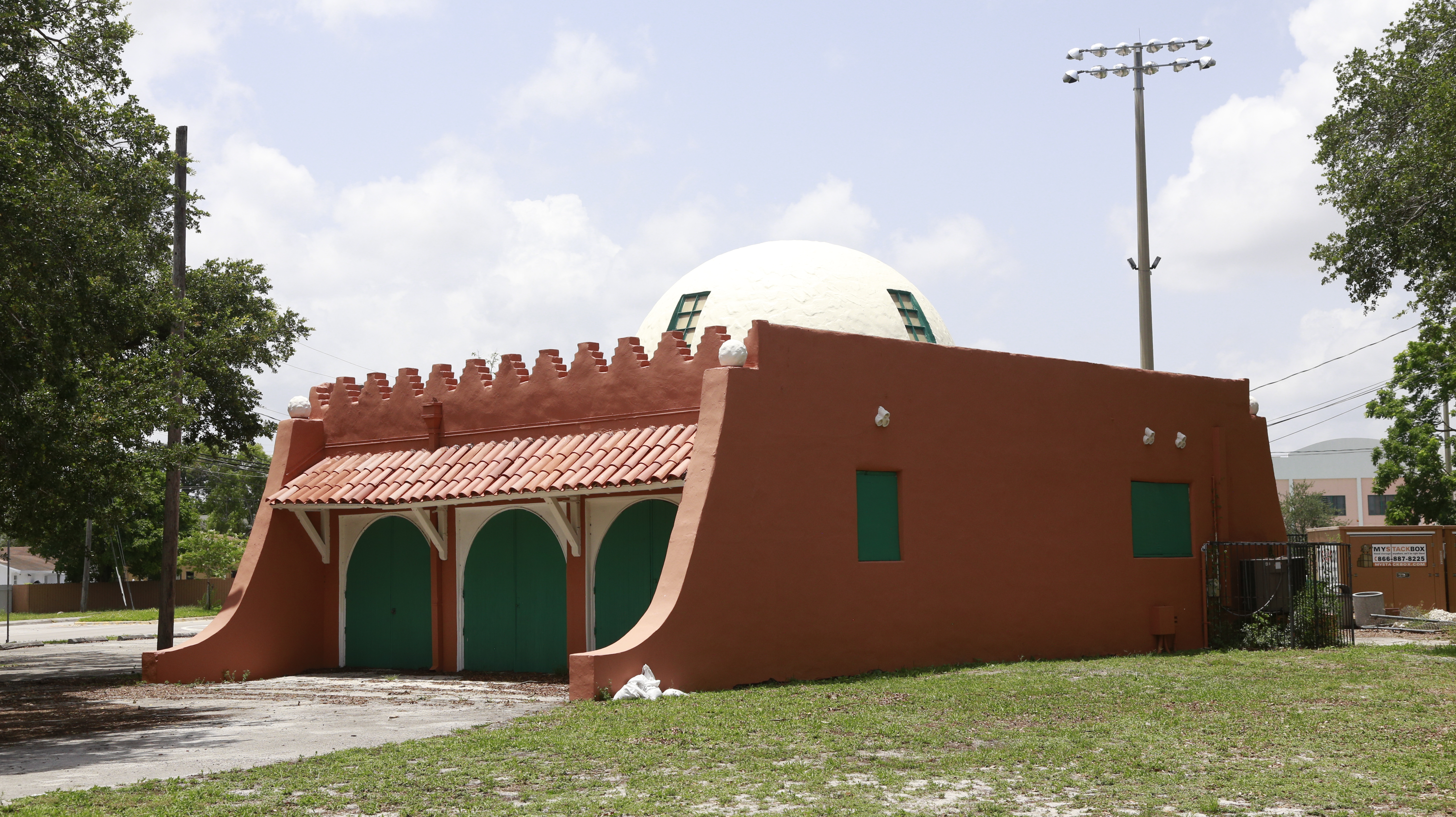
Historic Opa-locka Fire & Police Station, 1926

Miami-Dade County Public Schools serves Opa-locka.

Opa-locka has two public elementary schools: Nathan B. Young and Dr. Robert B. Ingram/Opa-locka Elementary.

North Dade Middle School in Miami Gardens and Hialeah/Miami Lakes Senior High in Hialeah serve the city.

== Library ==
The Opa-locka Branch library is one of the 50 branches included within the Miami-Dade Public Library System. This branch is open to the public on weekdays offering an After School Club and Storytime for children.

== Religion ==
Opa-locka had 30 houses of worship in 1996. During that year, Oscar Musibay of the Miami New Times said, "Like South Beach has hotels, Opa-locka has churches."

== Transportation ==
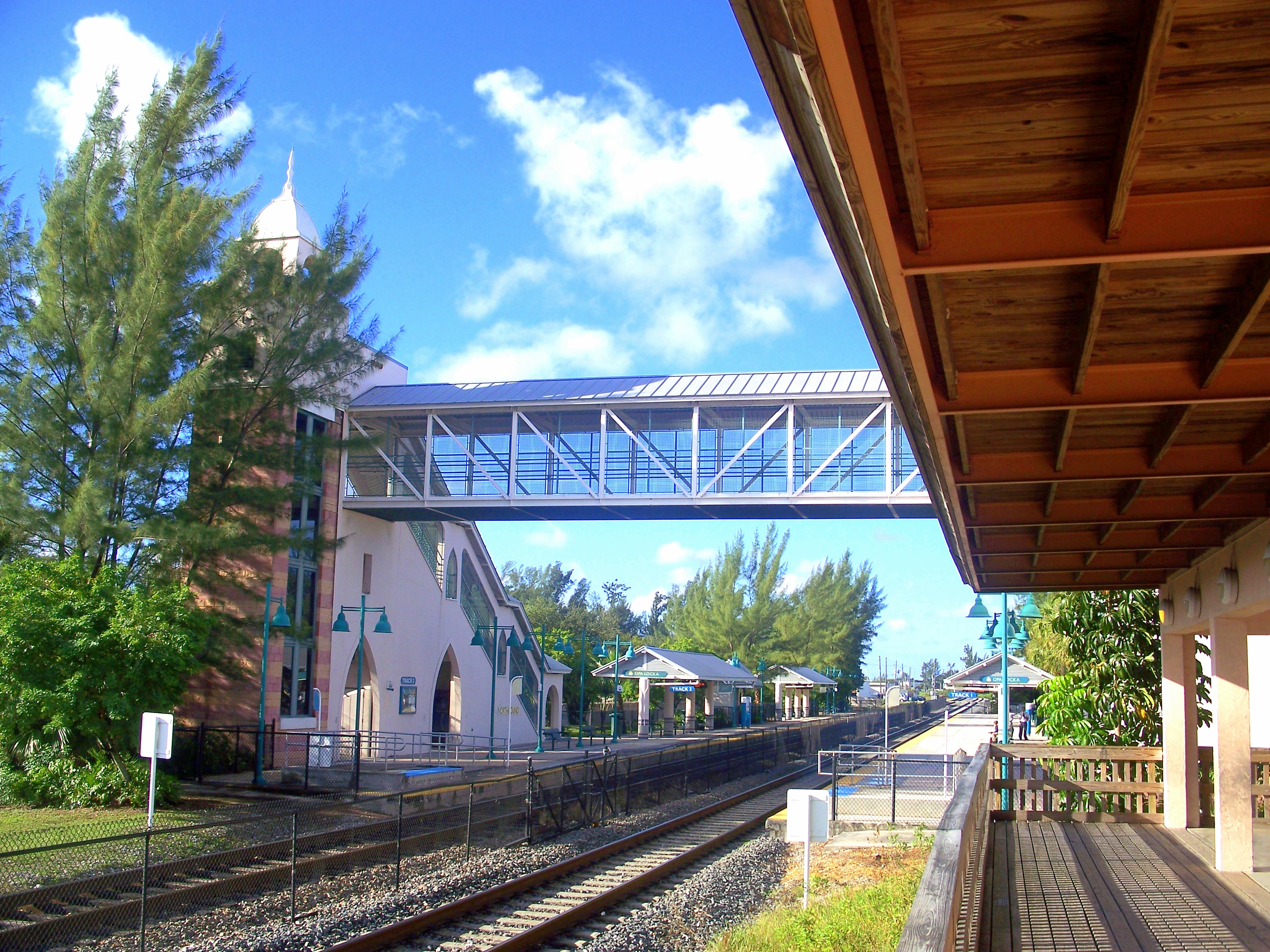
The modern Opa-Locka Tri-Rail commuter station, next door to the former Opa-Locka Railroad Station built by the Seaboard Air Line Railroad and now on the National Register of Historic Places

Opa-locka is served by Opa-locka Executive Airport, owned and operated by the Miami-Dade County Aviation Department. Additionally, Opa-locka is served by Miami-Dade Transit buses and by Tri-Rail via the Opa-locka Station.

=== Miami Municipal Airport ===
Amelia Earhart launched her historic trip around the world from Miami Municipal Airport, established by the city's founder, aviation pioneer Glenn Curtiss, then located in what is now the southern part of Opa-locka.

=== Opa-locka Executive Airport (OPF) ===
The German dirigible Graf Zeppelin visited Naval Air Station Miami, which later became Opa-locka Airport, as a regular stop on its Germany-Brazil-United States-Germany scheduled route.

In the 1950s, the Opa-locka airport—specifically Building 67—became the site of a large CIA operation, PBSuccess, run by operatives including E. Howard Hunt. The operation helped launch the U.S.-led coup in Guatemala in 1954 and was a precursor to the Bay of Pigs Invasion in 1961. The airfield center then served as a listening post for Cuba until the 82nd Airborne took over Opa-locka Airbase during the Cuban Missile Crisis.

By the 1970s, Dade County would assume control of the property, with a focus to increase private investments in FBOs and other commercial industries. Today, OPF is one of the busiest general and business aviation airports in the nation, and is also home to the Miami U.S. Coast Guard Station.

== In popular culture ==
- The sequence in the 1964 James Bond movie Goldfinger in which CIA agent Felix Leiter is tailing Oddjob, who is driving Mr. Solo to the airport, was filmed in Opa-Locka.
- Opa-locka is featured in the landmark 1969 documentary film Salesman, by the Maysles Brothers.
- In 1970, Mary Ann Vecchio, a teenaged runaway from Opa-locka, was in Kent, Ohio, on the day of the Kent State shootings on May 4, 1970. The image of Vecchio, kneeling by the body of a slain Kent State student, taken by Greensburg Tribune-Review freelancer John Filo, later won a Pulitzer Prize.
- Opa-Loka is the title of a song on the 1975 album Warrior on the Edge of Time by the British band Hawkwind.
- In the 1991 film Soapdish, the leading character, played by Kevin Kline, is a down-and-out actor reduced to drunkenly performing the role of Willy Loman in the play Death of a Salesman at the fictitious "Opa-Locka Dinner Theater."
- Opa-locka is mentioned in the 1995 action movie The Substitute by a black student who is being disciplined by Tom Berenger.
- Opa-Locka is mentioned by “Rick Ross” in the song “Reppin My City” when he states, “ It's poppin' in Opa-Locka Floppin' them candy paints.”

== Notable people ==
- Brisco, rapper
- Henry W. Baird, US Army general, mayor of Opa-Locka (1942–1948)
- Harry Wayne Casey, singer
- Dalvin Cook, NFL player
- Rohan Davey, NFL player
- Thad Lewis, NFL player
- Montel Vontavious Porter, professional wrestler
- Aurin Squire, playwright
- Jeremiah Smith, college football player
- Yung Miami, rapper
