= Bernhardt E. Muller =

American architect

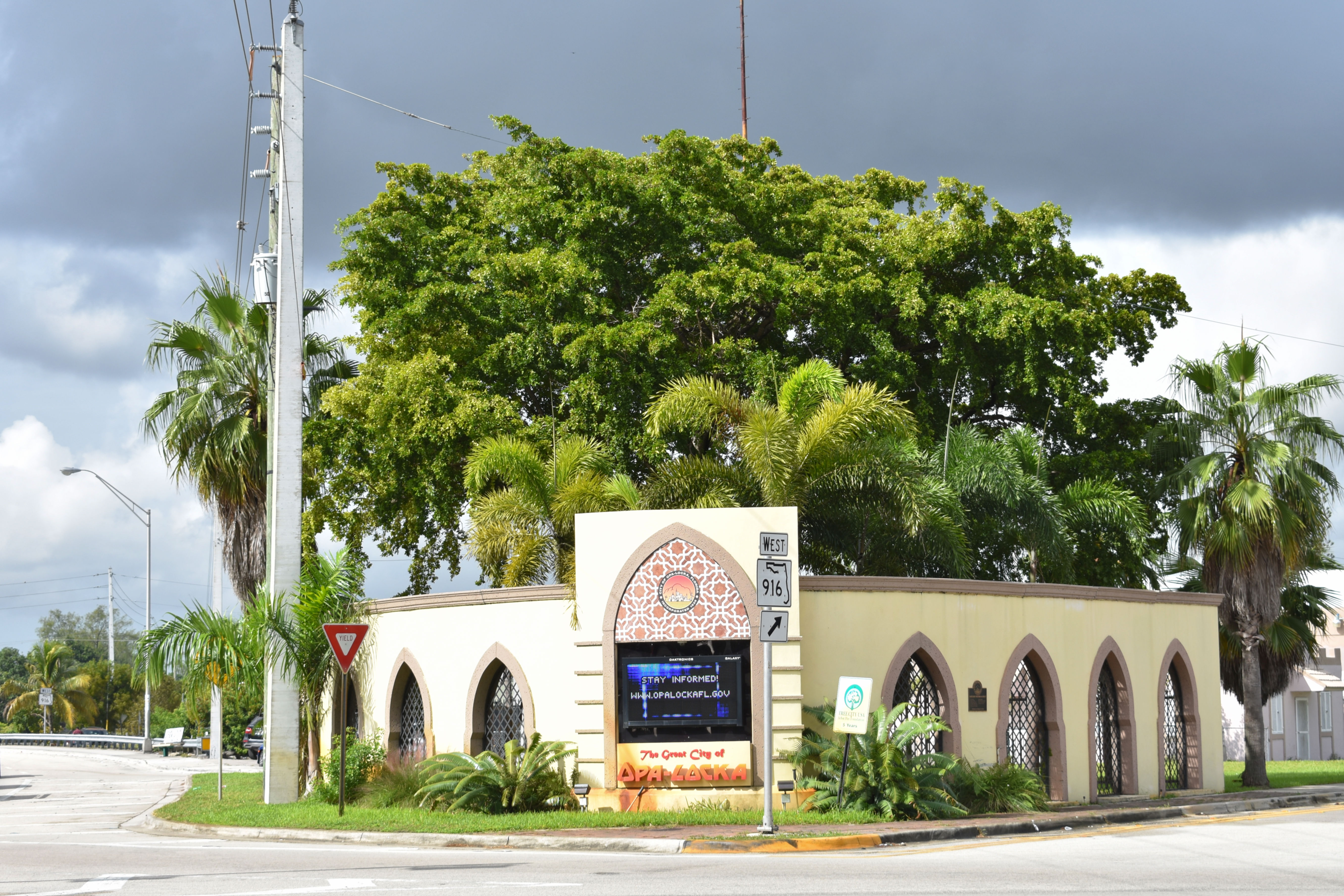
The Gateway Round-A-Bout was dedicated by the City of Opa-Locka, Florida, October, 2014. The building's Moorish architecture continues a theme of 1920s developer Glenn H. Curtiss and his architect, Bernhardt E. Muller.

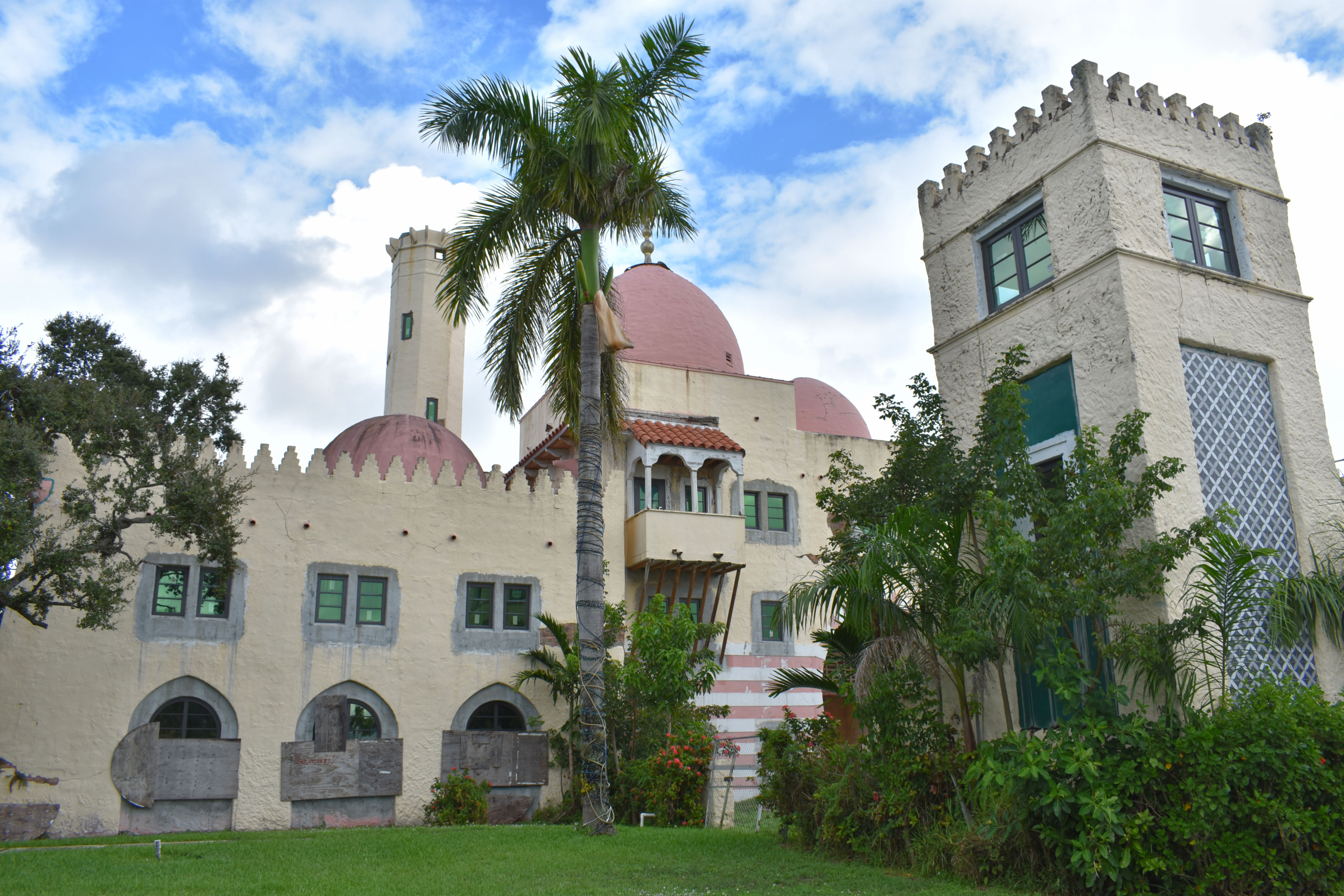
City Hall (1926) in Opa Locka, Florida, also known as the Opa-Locka Company Administration Building, was designed by Bernhardt E. Muller. The building was inspired by "The Talking Bird," a tale in the Arabian Nights.

Bernhardt Emil Muller, usually known as Bernhardt E. Muller, was an American architect who worked chiefly in Florida, where he designed many buildings in the 1920s and 1930s that have been listed on the National Register of Historic Places.

He is known for "the distinctive architecture loosely described as the 'Arabian Nights style,' or more specifically but still rather loosely, the Moorish Revival Style." Many of his works are in the Opa-locka Thematic Resource Area, located in Miami-Dade County.

== Biography ==
Muller was born in Fremont, Nebraska on December 27, 1878. He studied at the Ecole des Beaux Arts in Paris from 1903 to 1905, then traveled and studied for a year in Italy, France, Austria, and Germany. He began his career as a draftsman for the New York architectural firm of Trowbridge and Livingston in 1906. In 1909 he became a designer for the firm of Robert J. Reiley. Muller moved on to the firm of D. Everett Waid in 1912 where he was also employed as an architectural designer until 1914, when he opened his own office in New York City.

Muller’s earliest known work in South Florida dates to 1923 when he designed a number of Mediterranean and Spanish-style houses in the Miami area.

In 1925, Bernhardt Muller met Glenn H. Curtiss, the owner and developer of Opa-Locka, at the recommendation of Mr. Curtiss’ mother, Mrs. Lua Andrews Curtiss. In a 1927 article appearing in the Opa-Locka Times, Muller relates the story of how he visualized the new development. He decided that an opportunity was at hand to make an architectural theme for a new community from a literary work. One night the architect read a copy of The One Thousand and One Tales of the Arabian Nights. Muller was fascinated by the descriptions of the Tales, and he said that he re-lived the fantasies in his dreams that night. The following morning he wired Curtiss with his ideas. Later, they met at the site that was to become Opa-Locka, where Muller described his concept for the city’s architectural design, derived from the individual stories of the Arabian Nights. Curtiss agreed that the Arabian Nights theme would make for a unique and exciting development.

During November 1925, from his New York office, Muller designed several of the prominent buildings which would form the new town, including the Opa-Locka Company’s Administration Building, the swimming pool (Bathing Casino), and an Archery Club. The Richter Library’s collection has records of eighty-six of Muller commissions; although it is not known exactly how many buildings Muller designed, it is estimated to be about one hundred. As construction progressed and sales increased, Opa-Locka was incorporated as a town in May 1926.

Following the devastating hurricane that struck Miami on September 17, 1926, the Florida Land Boom went bust and progress at Opa-Locka slowed. Glenn Curtiss decided in the summer of 1927 to put all un-built plans for the young city on hold until the economy improved. As a result of further decline in land sales, the ensuing Great Depression of 1929, and Curtiss’ death in 1930, virtually no buildings were executed after 1928. Muller, who remained in New York, went on to do other work, particularly in New York, New Jersey, and Connecticut.

In 1942, Muller retired from full-time practice, closed his office, and went to work for George M. Sharp, Inc., as the interior designer for luxury ocean liners. This association lasted until 1955.

A member of the First Church of Christ, Scientist, in Maplewood, New Jersey, Bernhardt Muller designed a number of Christian Science churches, located mostly in the state of New York. The American Architect Directory of 1956 lists his most notable designs for these churches as those in Brooklyn (1918), Hempstead (1924), Forest Hills (1925), Bronxville (1929), and Flushing (1930), all in New York, as well a building for a new congregation in Opa-Locka (1930). Muller was noted for his design of small suburban houses in Short Hills, Maplewood, and Millburn, New Jersey, mostly of the Tudor English motif, which was characteristic of his own home in Millburn.

Muller was elected to membership in the American Institute of Architects (A.I.A.) in 1924; he was a member of the New York City chapter. Muller attained the status of Emeritus member of the A.I.A. in 1952. He was also a member of the Summit (New Jersey) Art Association.

Little of Bernhardt Muller’s personal life is known. He was married in 1919 and his wife died in 1958. The couple had no children. According to Frank S. Bush, a friend of Muller’s, he was known as a man of great foresight, unimpeachable reputation and integrity, in addition to being thoughtfully creative.

In 1959, at age 80, Mr. Muller returned for a “Pioneer Days” celebration in Opa-Locka, his first visit to the city since the late 1920s. In an interview with Opa-Locka’s newspaper, the North Dade Hub, Muller explained the original intent of his scheme for Opa-Locka:

"In planning the city, our [Muller and Curtiss] idea was to avoid the only too-well known checkerboard idea of development with the visual square boxes planted on each lot, making a composite of architectural abortions with which we are surrounded on all sides in America."

What Bernhardt Muller found upon returning to Opa-Locka were not the charming, beautifully-designed Moorish Revival buildings he had created. In addition to many altered and demolished buildings of his design, he found a collection of plain, unappealing structures, much like any other American town could exhibit, which he sought to avoid in his work. In an address to the city’s Chamber of Commerce, Muller attempted to convince its citizens to continue pursuing Curtiss’ dream: to make a distinguished, livable city, unique character. His speech warned the city’s officials to prevent Opa-Locka from becoming a “meaningless jumble of unrelated buildings, painted in hideous colors.” While Muller’s intent was to inspire the city to action, local officials were offended by the architect’s criticism.

Muller left Opa-Locka, the city of his dreams ruined; he returned to Short Hills, New Jersey, where he continued his architectural practice until about 1962. At age of eighty-five, Bernhardt E. Muller died in September, 1964.

Works include:

- Baird House (Opa-locka, Florida), 401 Dunad Ave., Opa-locka, Florida, NRHP-listed
- Cravero House, 1011 Sharar Ave., Opa-locka, Florida, NRHP-listed
- Crouse House, 1156 Peri St., Opa-locka, Florida, NRHP-listed
- Etheredge House, 915 Sharar Ave. Opa-locka, Florida, NRHP-listed
- Griffiths House (Opa-locka, Florida), 826 Superior St., Opa-locka, Florida, NRHP-listed
- Haislip House, 1141 Jann Ave., Opa-locka, Florida, NRHP-listed
- Helm Stores and Apartments, 1217 Sharazad Blvd., Opa-locka, Florida, NRHP-listed
- Helms House, 721 Sharar Ave., Opa-locka, Florida, NRHP-listed
- Higgins Duplex, 1210-1212 Sesame St., Opa-locka, Florida, NRHP-listed
- Harry Hurt Building, 490 Ali-Baba Ave., Opa-locka, Florida, NRHP-listed
- King Trunk Factory and Showroom, 951 Superior St., Opa-locka, Florida, NRHP-listed
- Long House, 613 Sharar Ave., Opa-locka, Florida, NRHP-listed
- Opa-locka Bank, 940 Caliph St., Opa-locka, Florida, NRHP-listed
- Opa-locka Company administration building, 777 Sharazad Blvd., Opa-locka, Florida, NRHP-listed
- Opa-locka Seaboard Air Line Railway Station (1927), 490 Ali Baba Ave., Opa-locka, Florida, (Muller, Bernard E.Y) NRHP-listed
- Root Building, 111 Perviz Ave., Opa-locka, Florida, NRHP-listed
- Taber Duplex, 1214—1216 Sesame St., Opa-locka, Florida, NRHP-listed
- Tinsman House, 1110 Peri St., Opa-locka, Florida, NRHP-listed
- Tooker House, 811 Dunad Ave., Opa-locka, Florida, NRHP-listed
- Wheeler House (Opa-locka, Florida), 1035 Dunad Ave., Opa-locka, Florida, NRHP-listed

== Publications ==
- Adapting Leaden Fittings to the Modern House, New York: Lead Industries Association, 193u, OCLC 27272486
- Lorio Iron Works (New Orleans, La.); Müller, Bernhardt E. (1939), Ornamental Ironwork by Master Craftsmen of Old New Orleans, New Orleans: Lorio Iron Works, OCLC 441855698
- Portfolio of Architectural Views and Sketches, New York, N.Y.?: s.n., 1920, OCLC 9627320

== Gallery ==
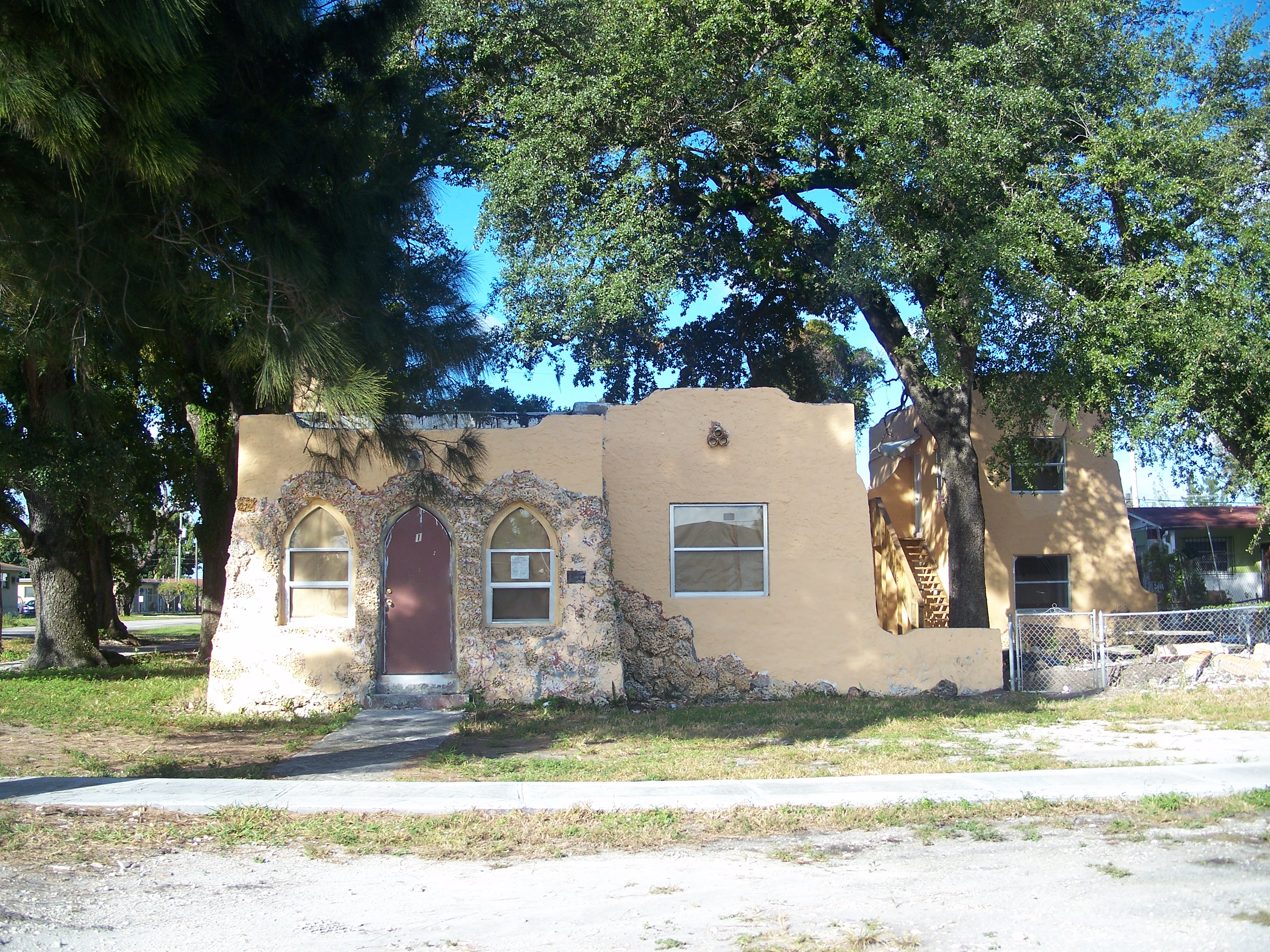
Baird House

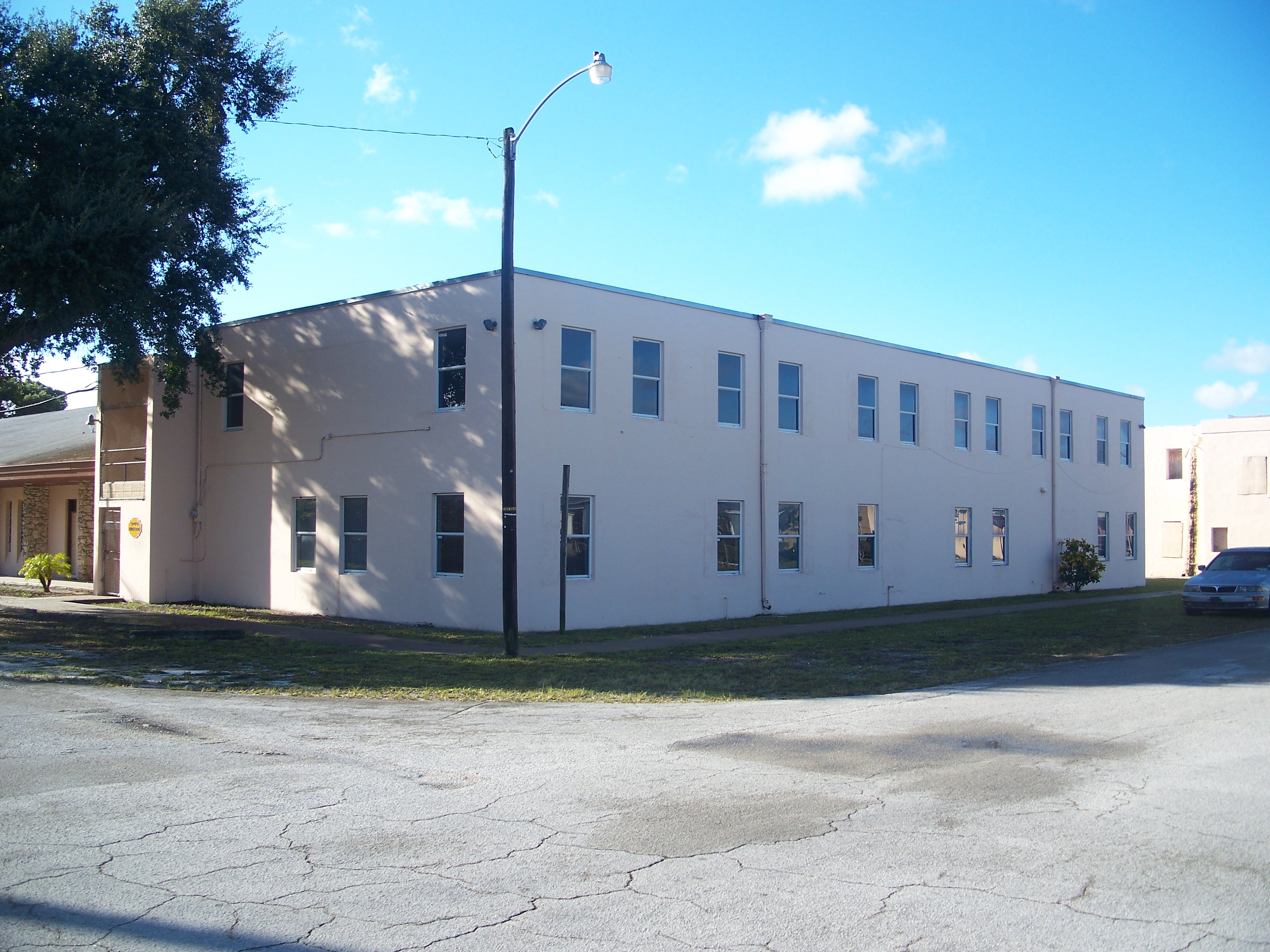
Bank

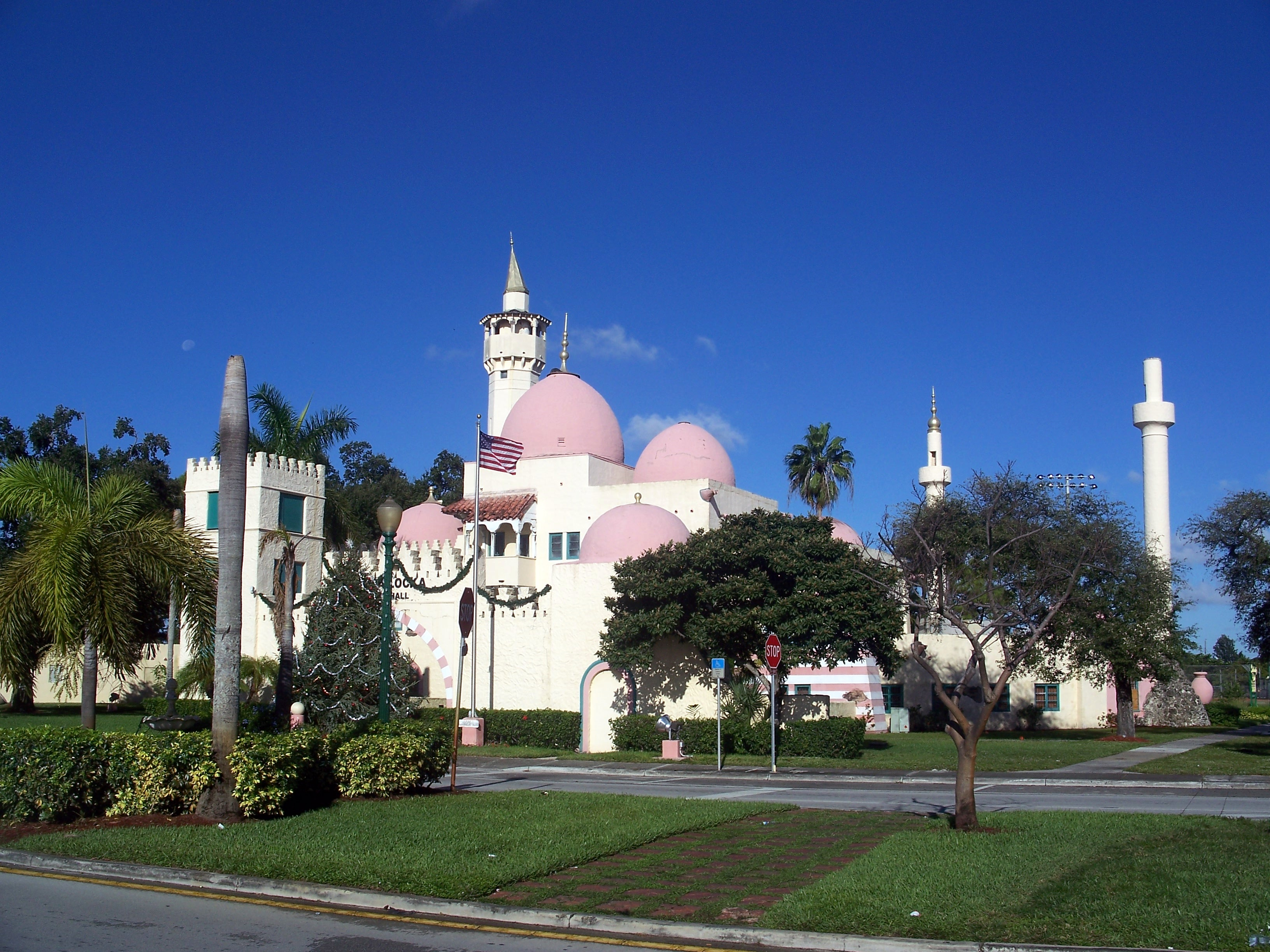
City hall

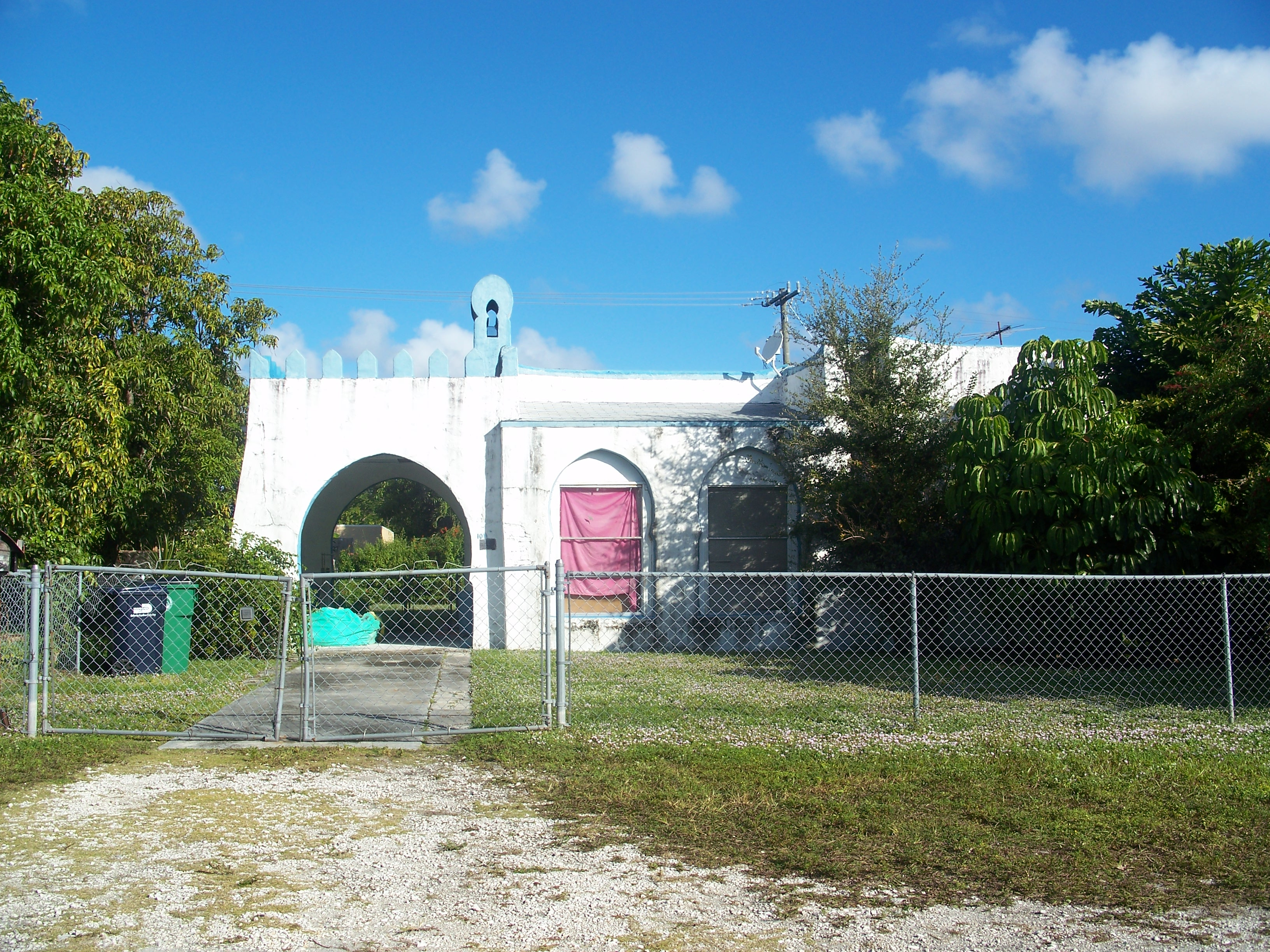
Cravero House

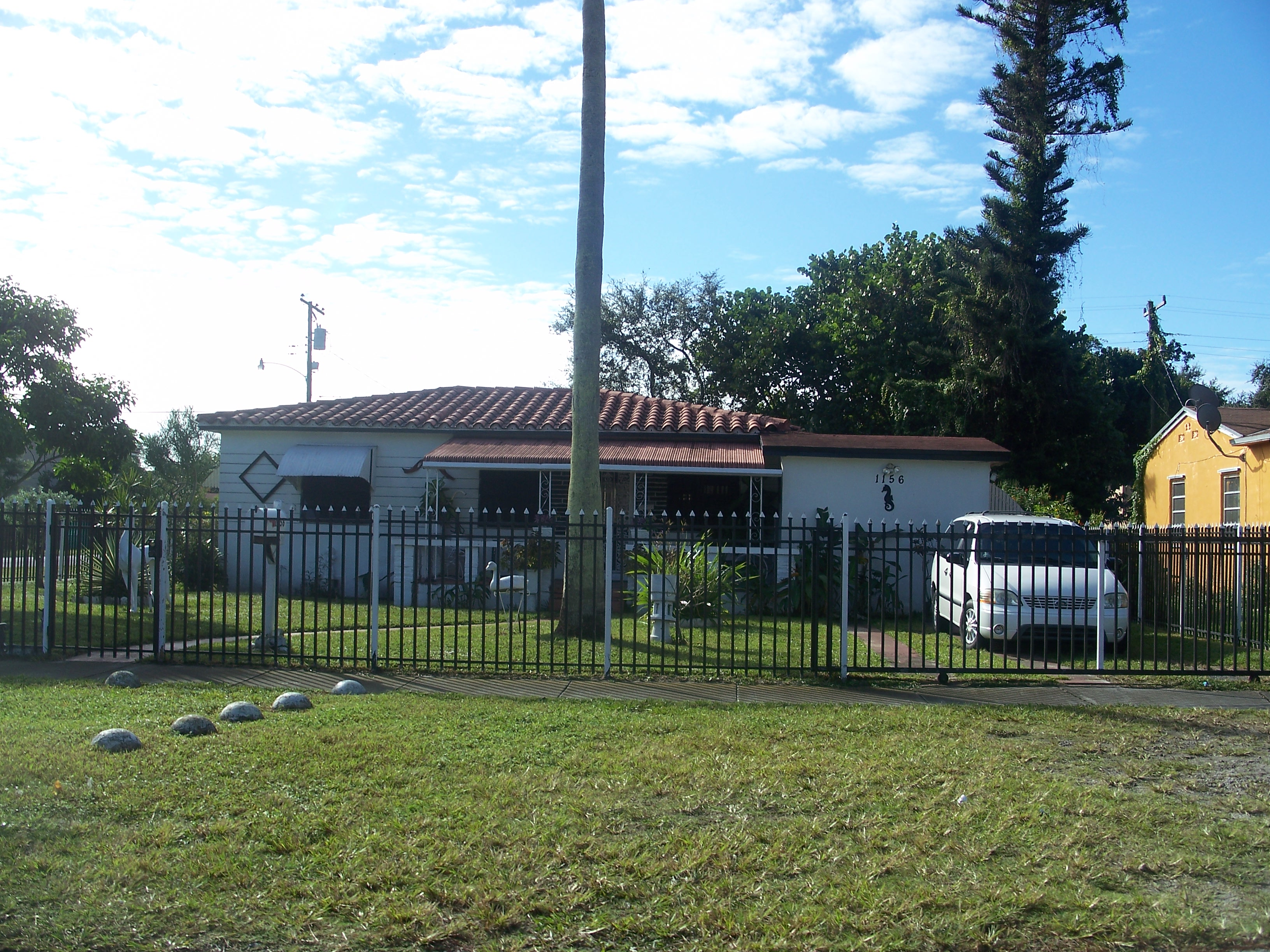
Crouse House

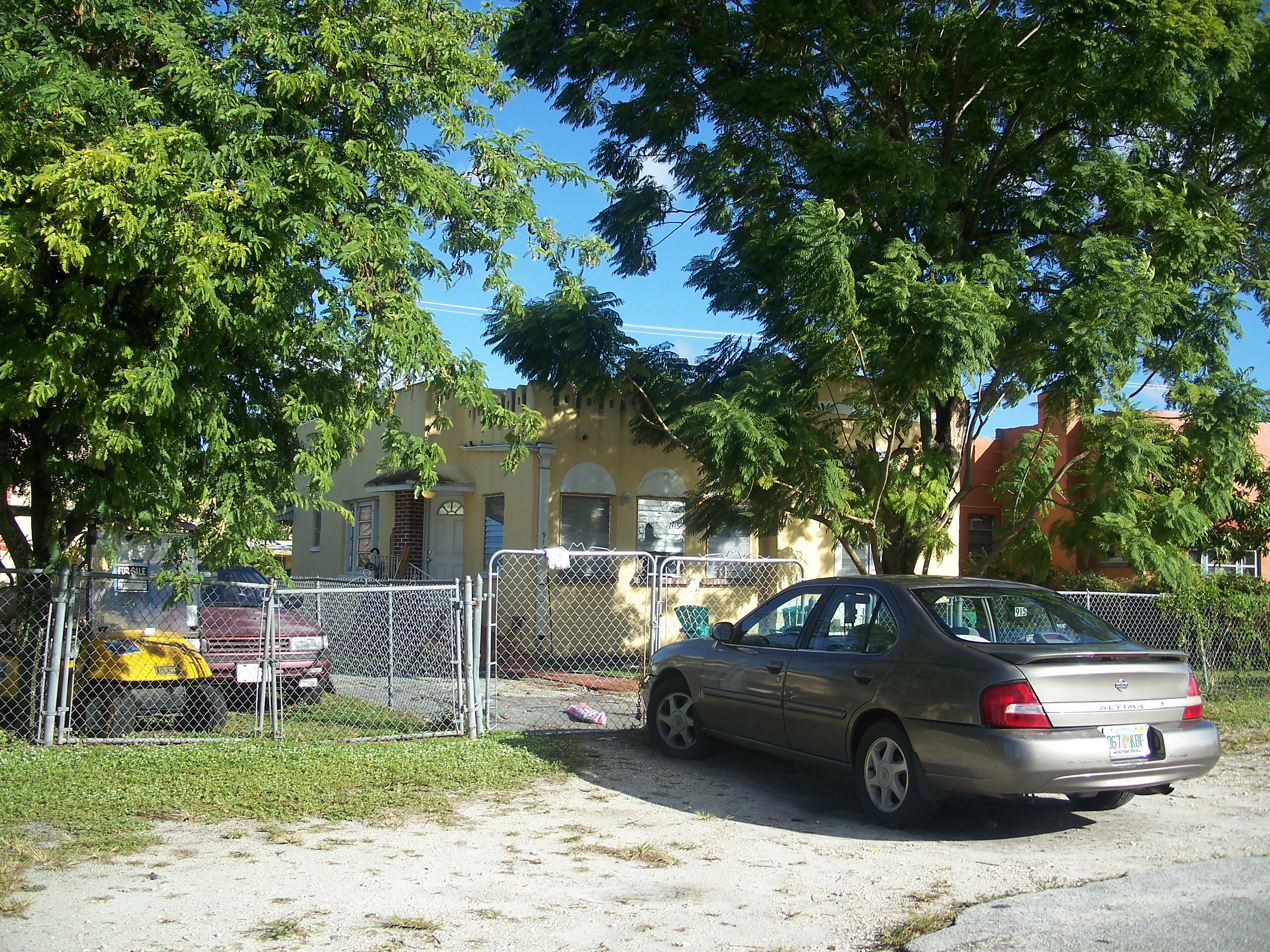
Etheredge House

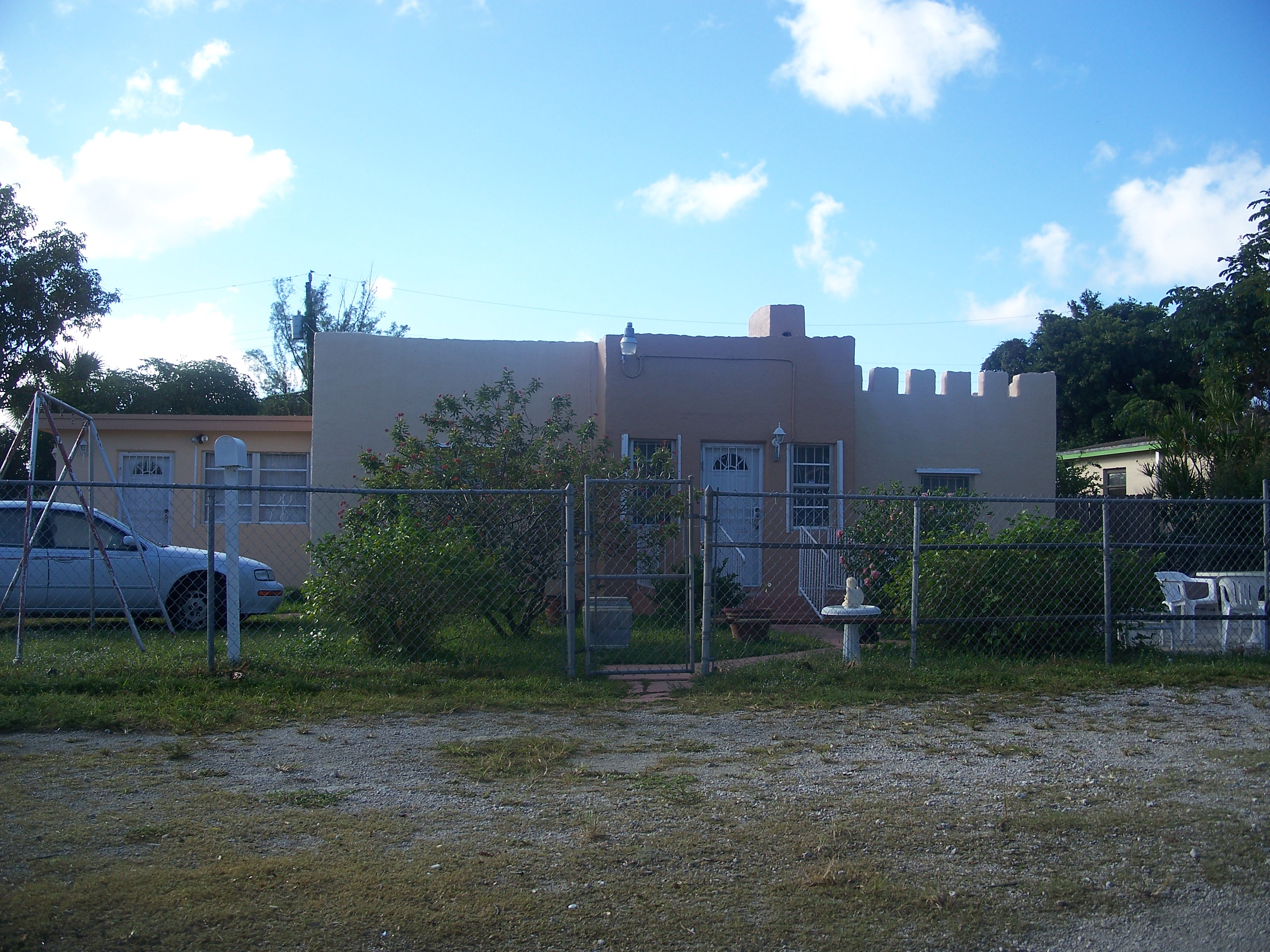
Griffiths House

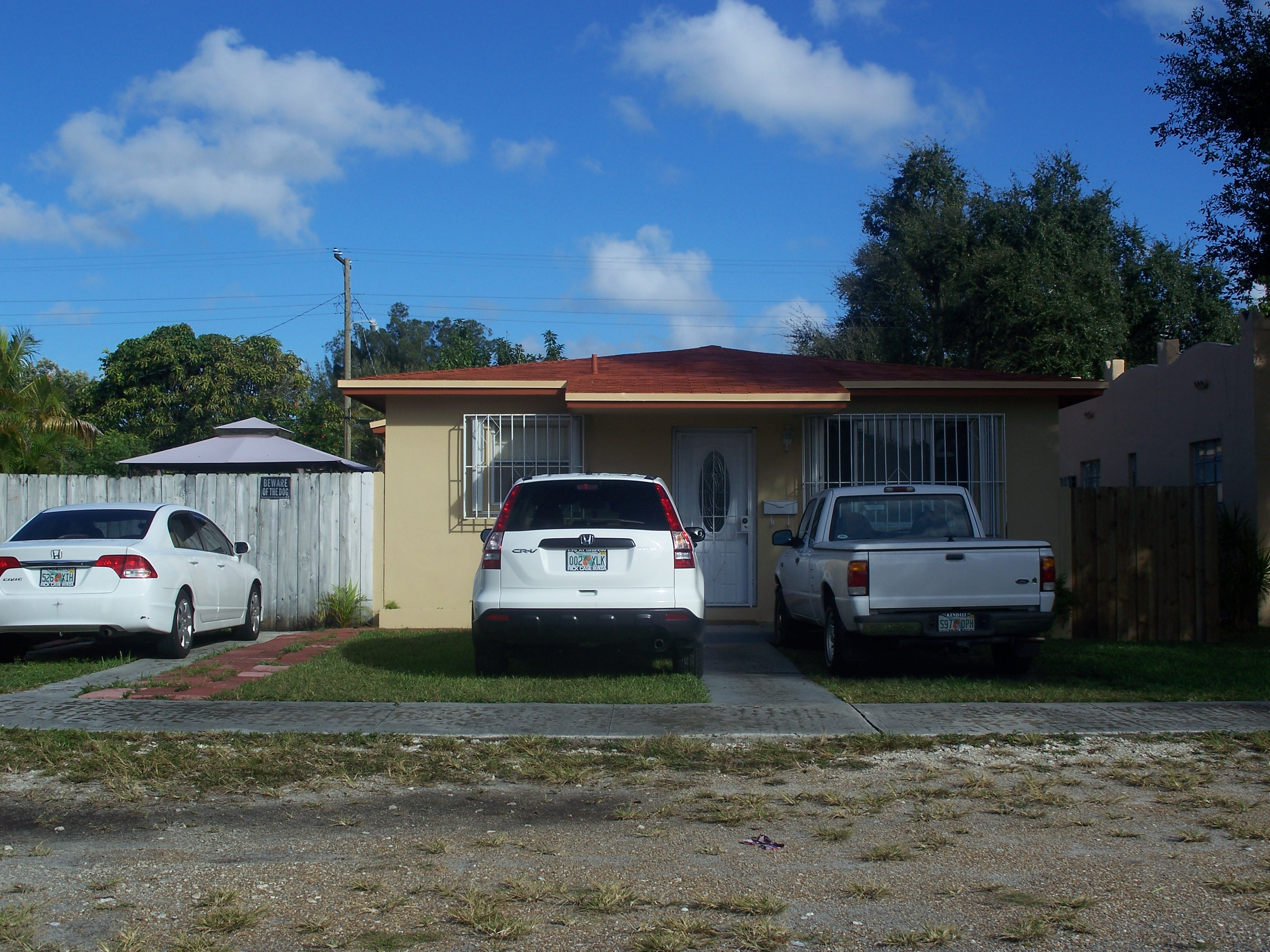
Haislip House

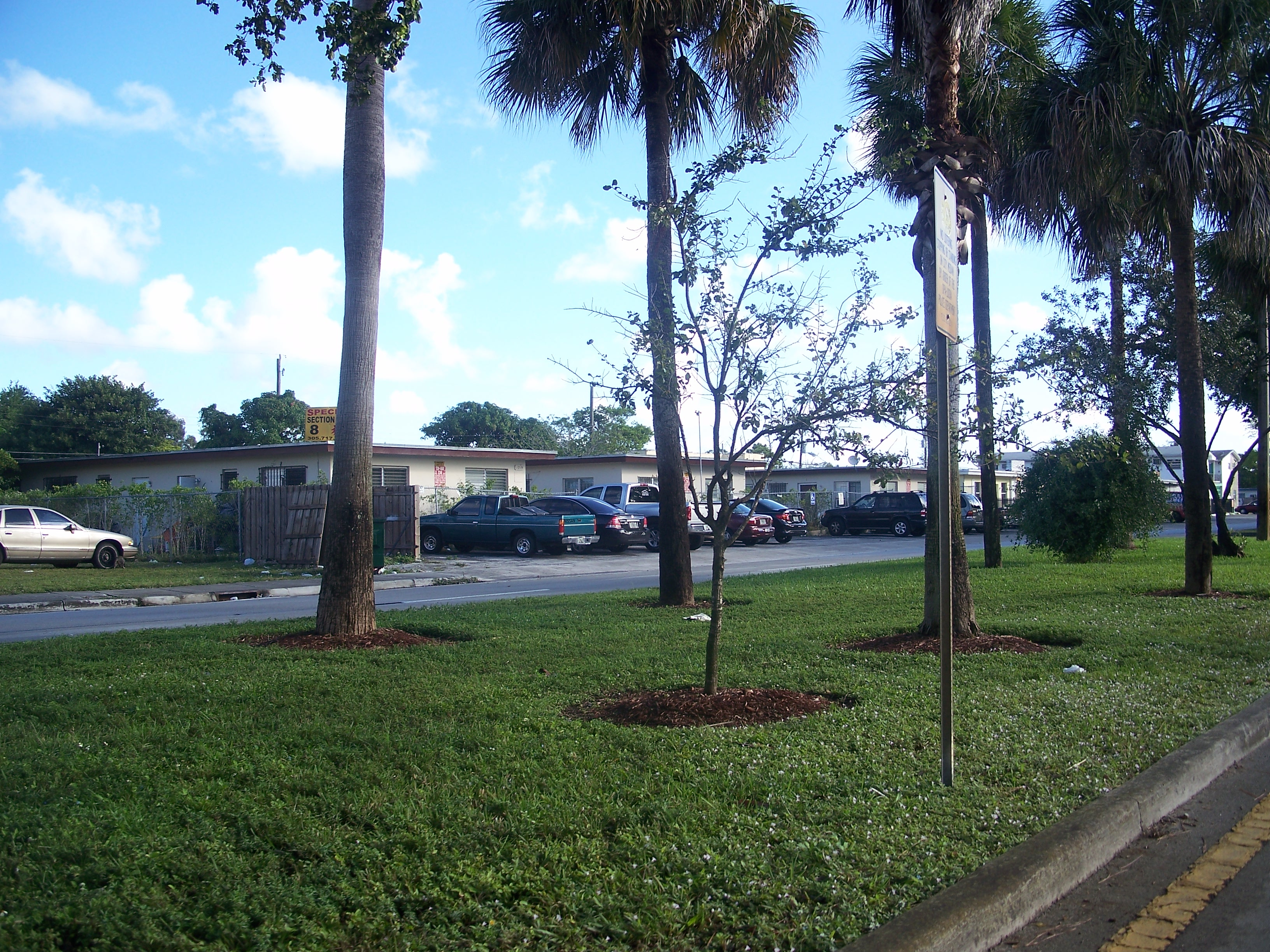
Helm Apartments

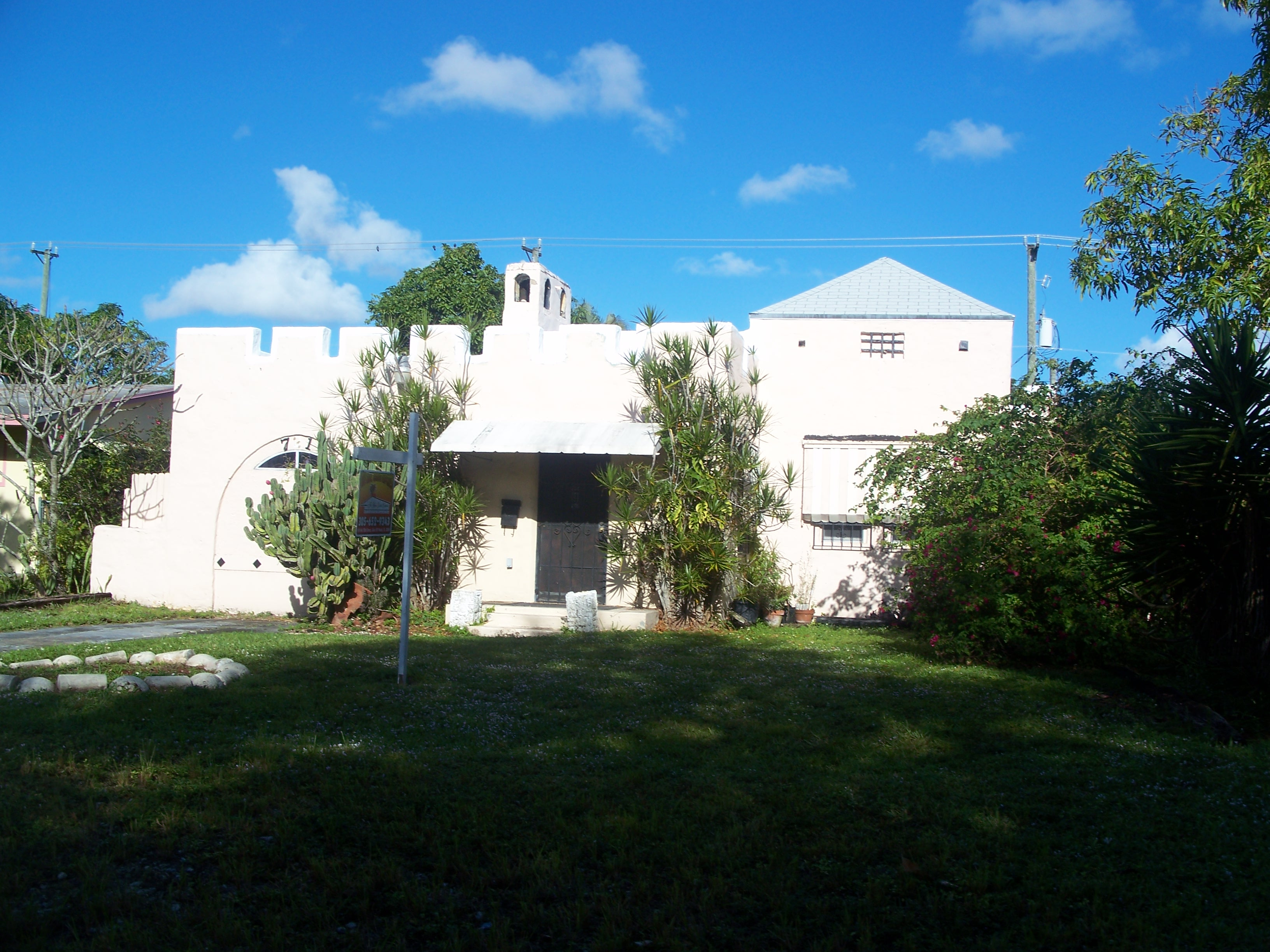
Helms House

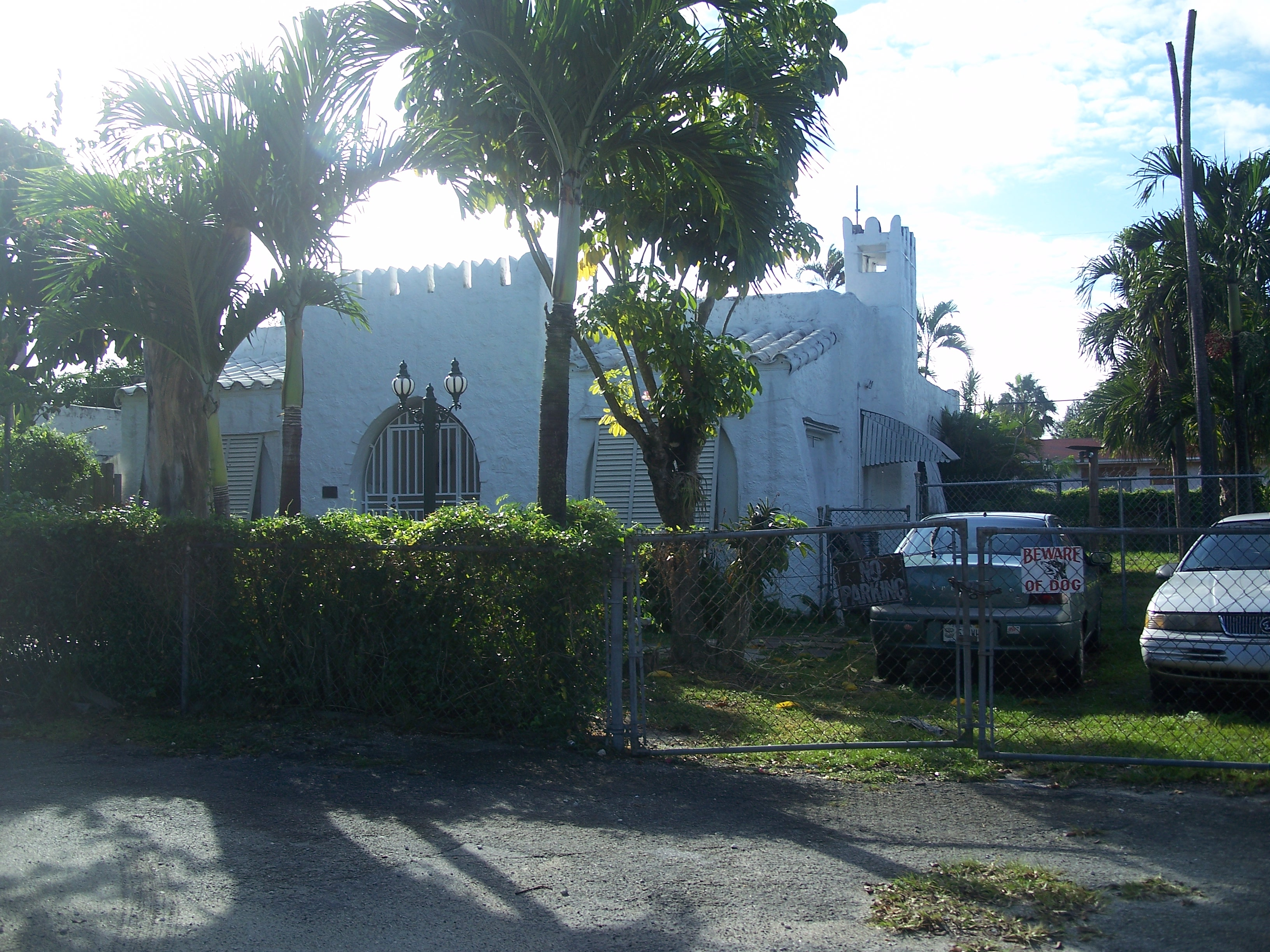
Higgins Duplex

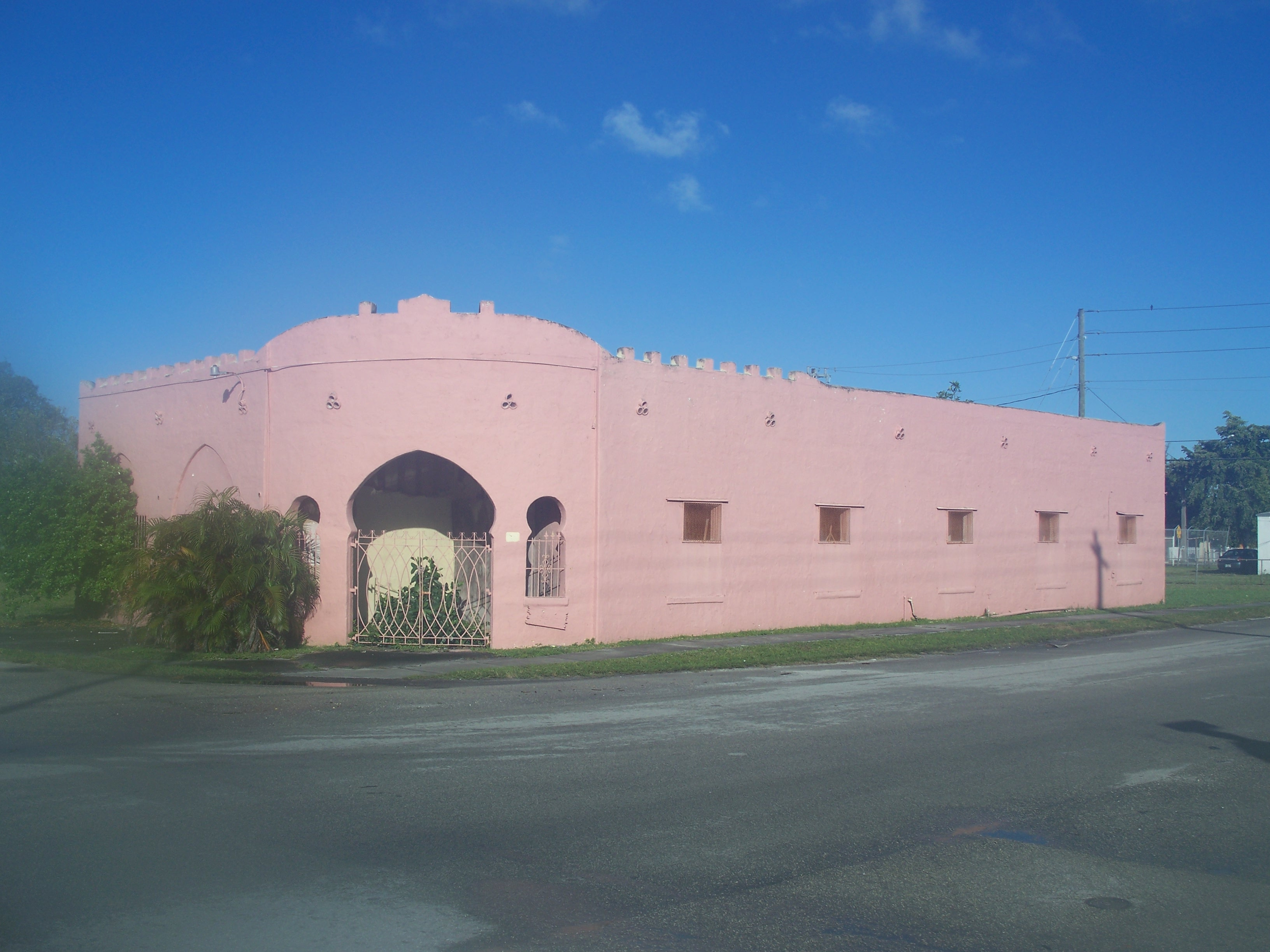
King Trunk Factory and Showroom

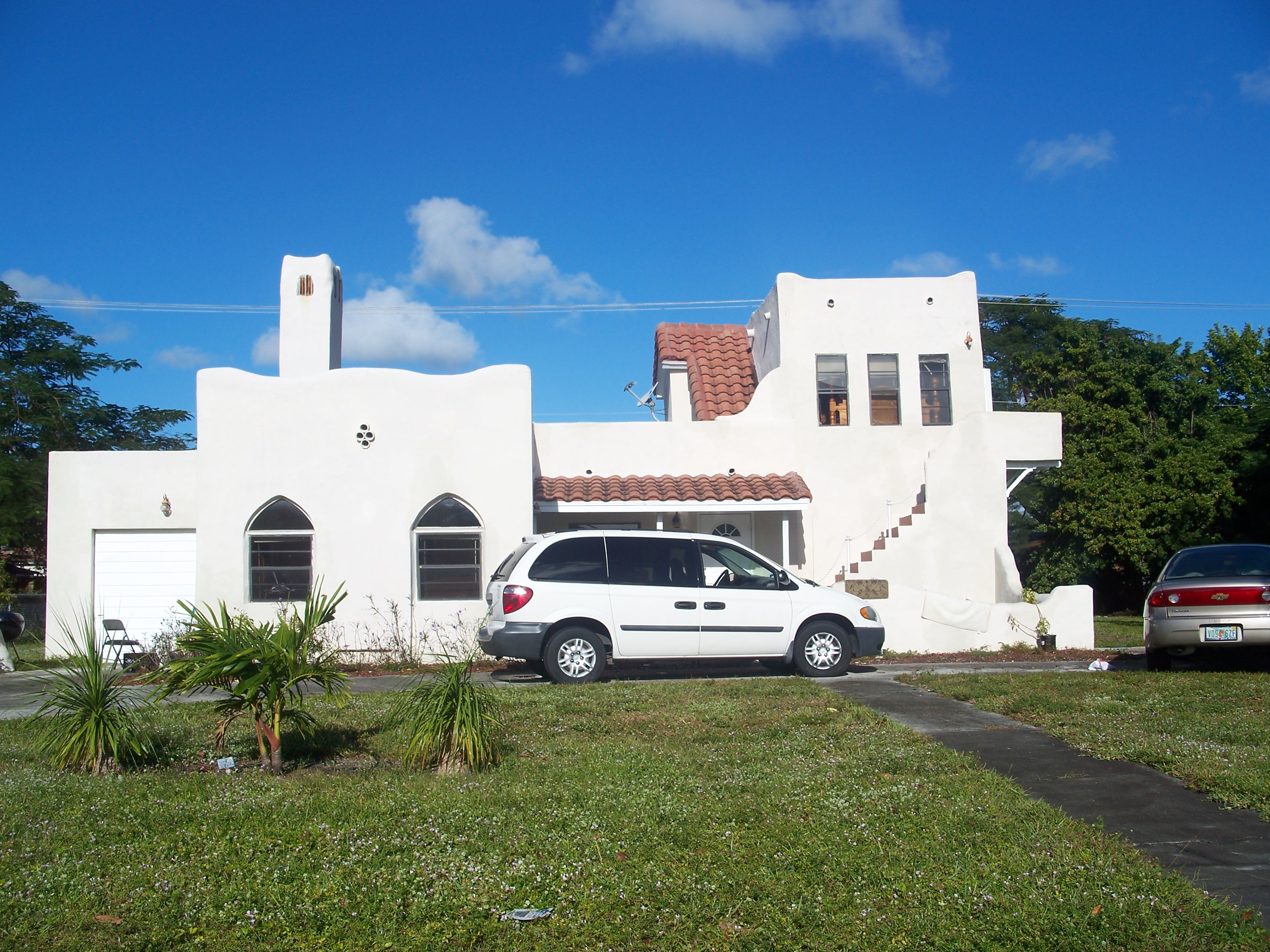
Long House

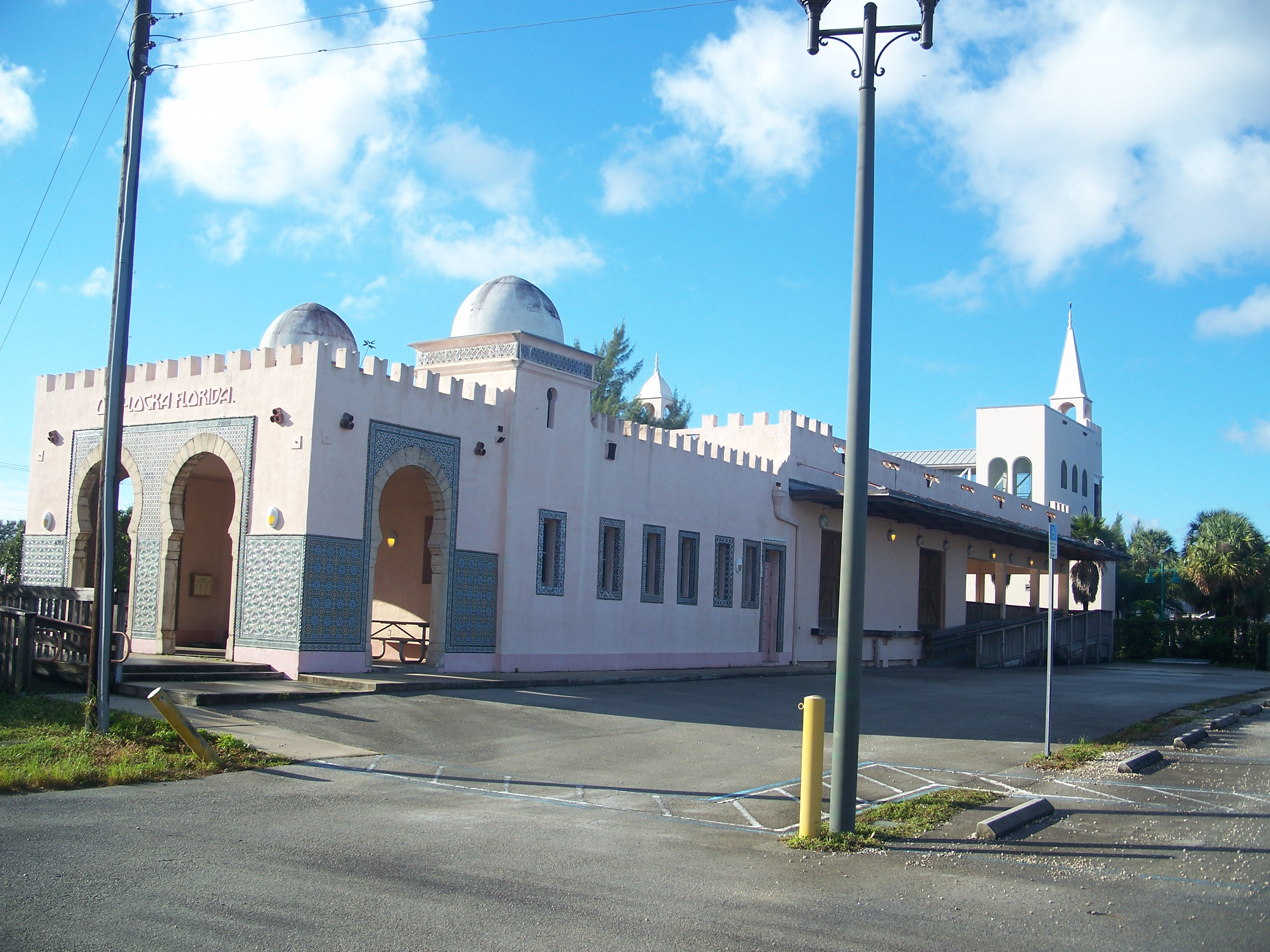
Opa-locka Railroad Station

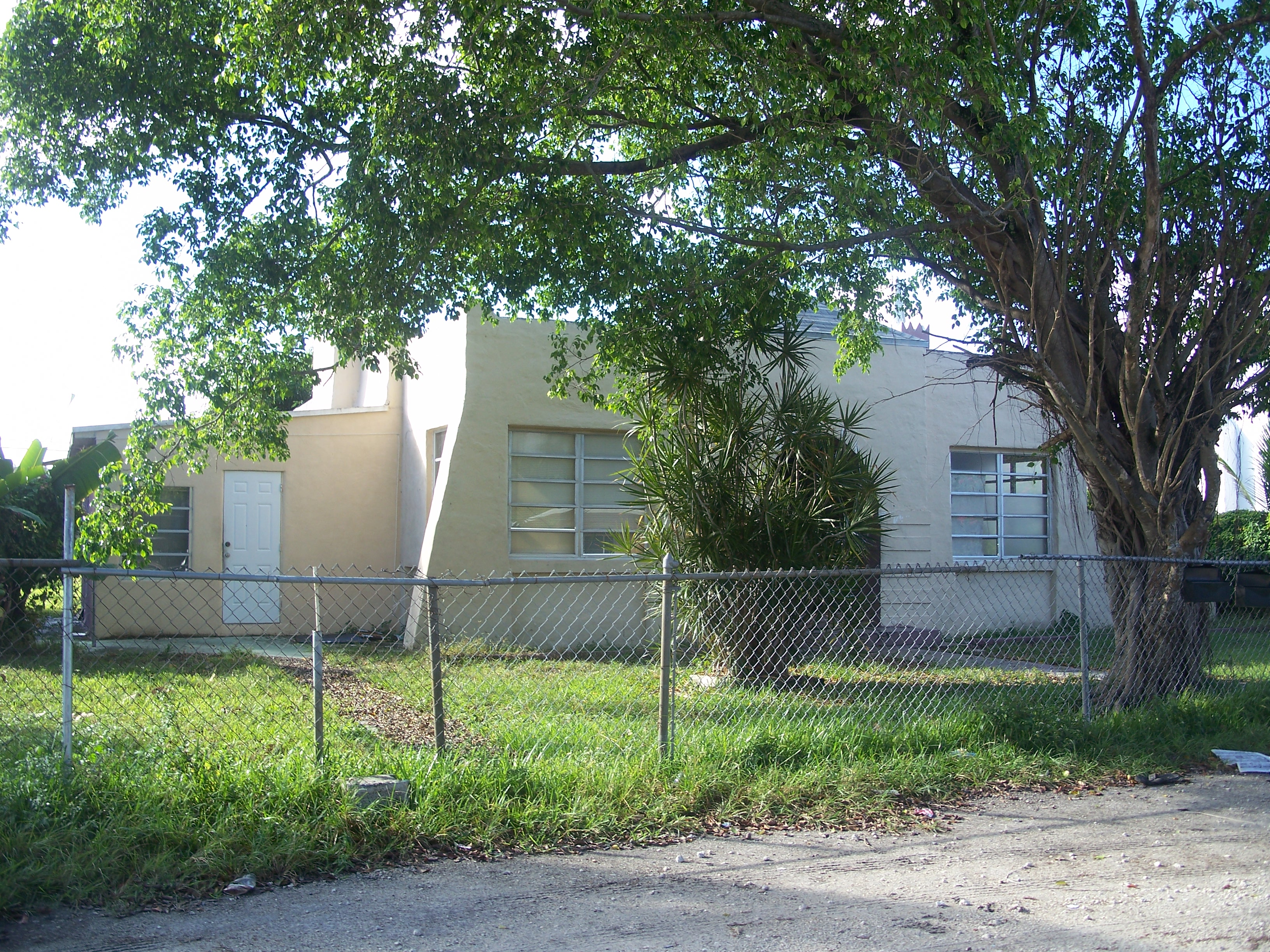
Taber Duplex

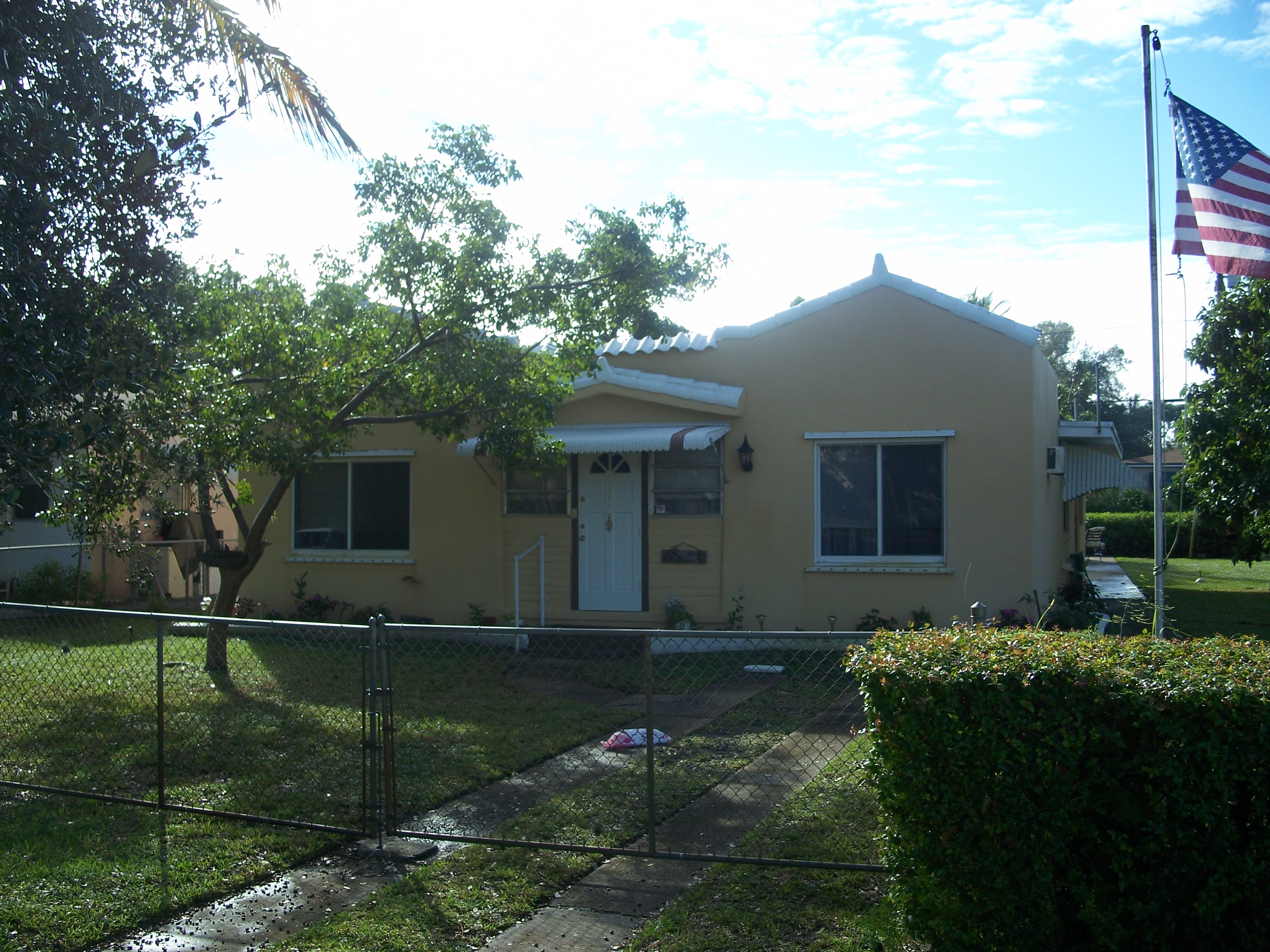
Tinsman House

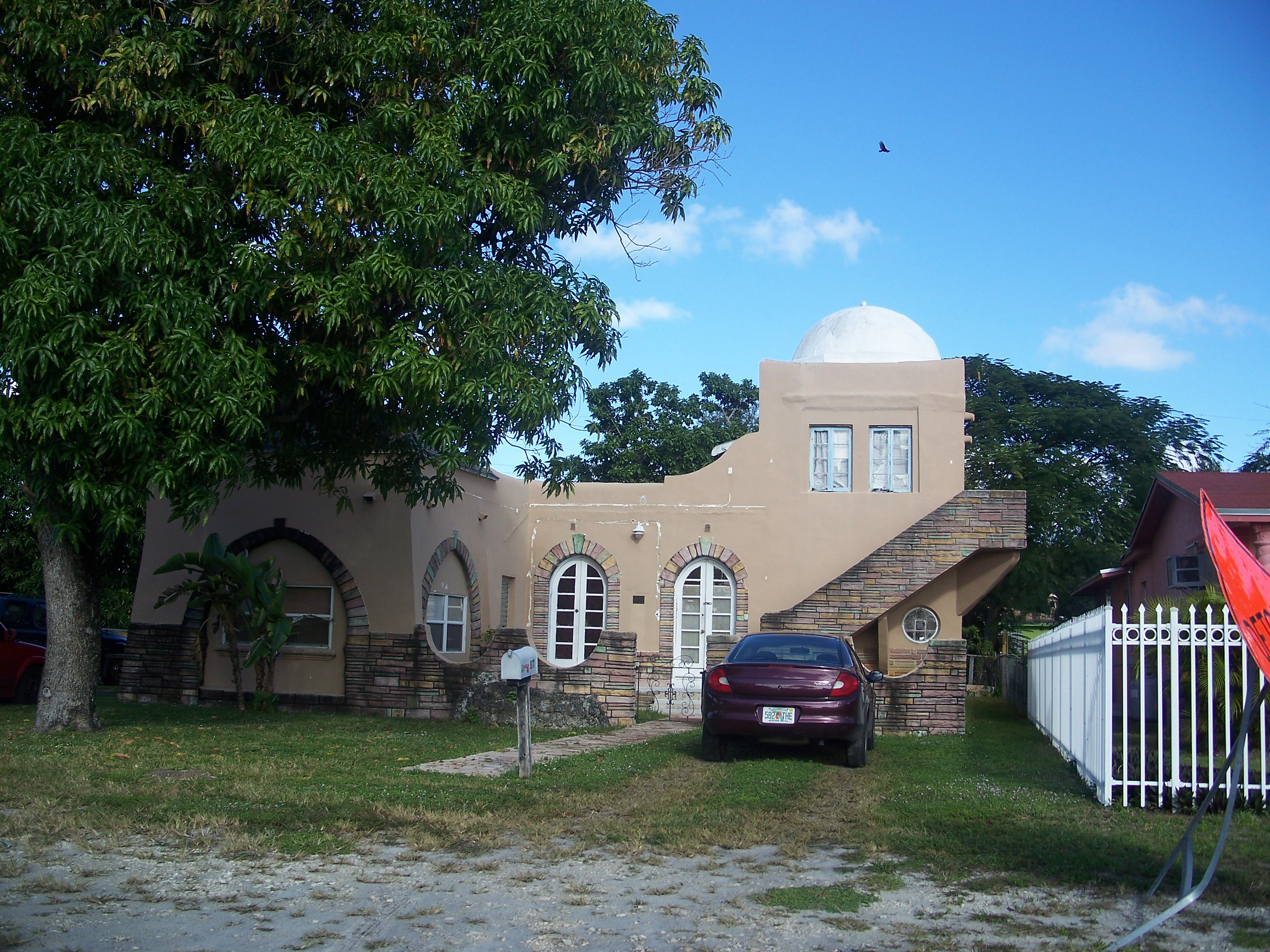
Tooker House

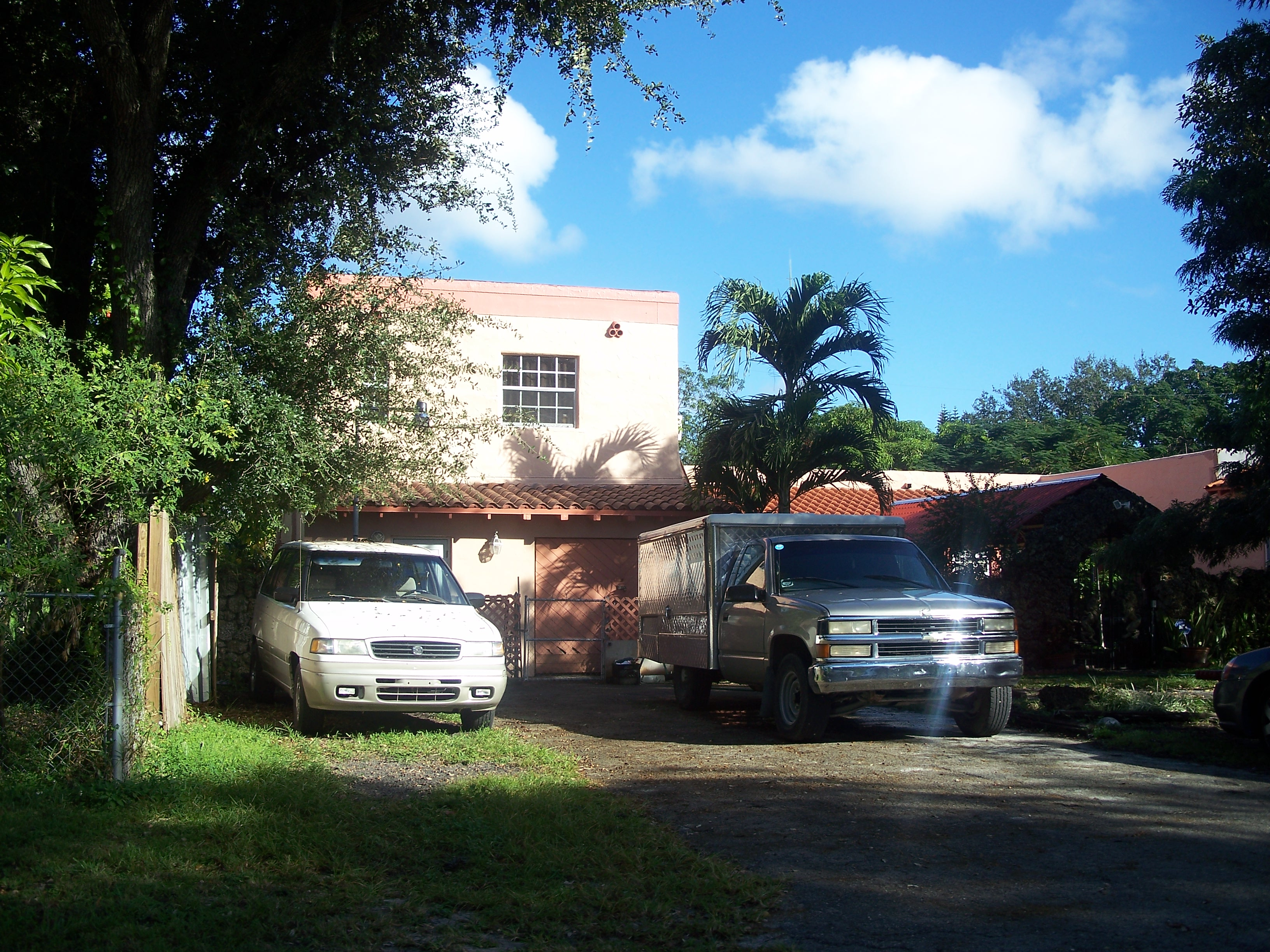
Wheeler House
