= Crouse House =

- U.S. National Register of Historic Places
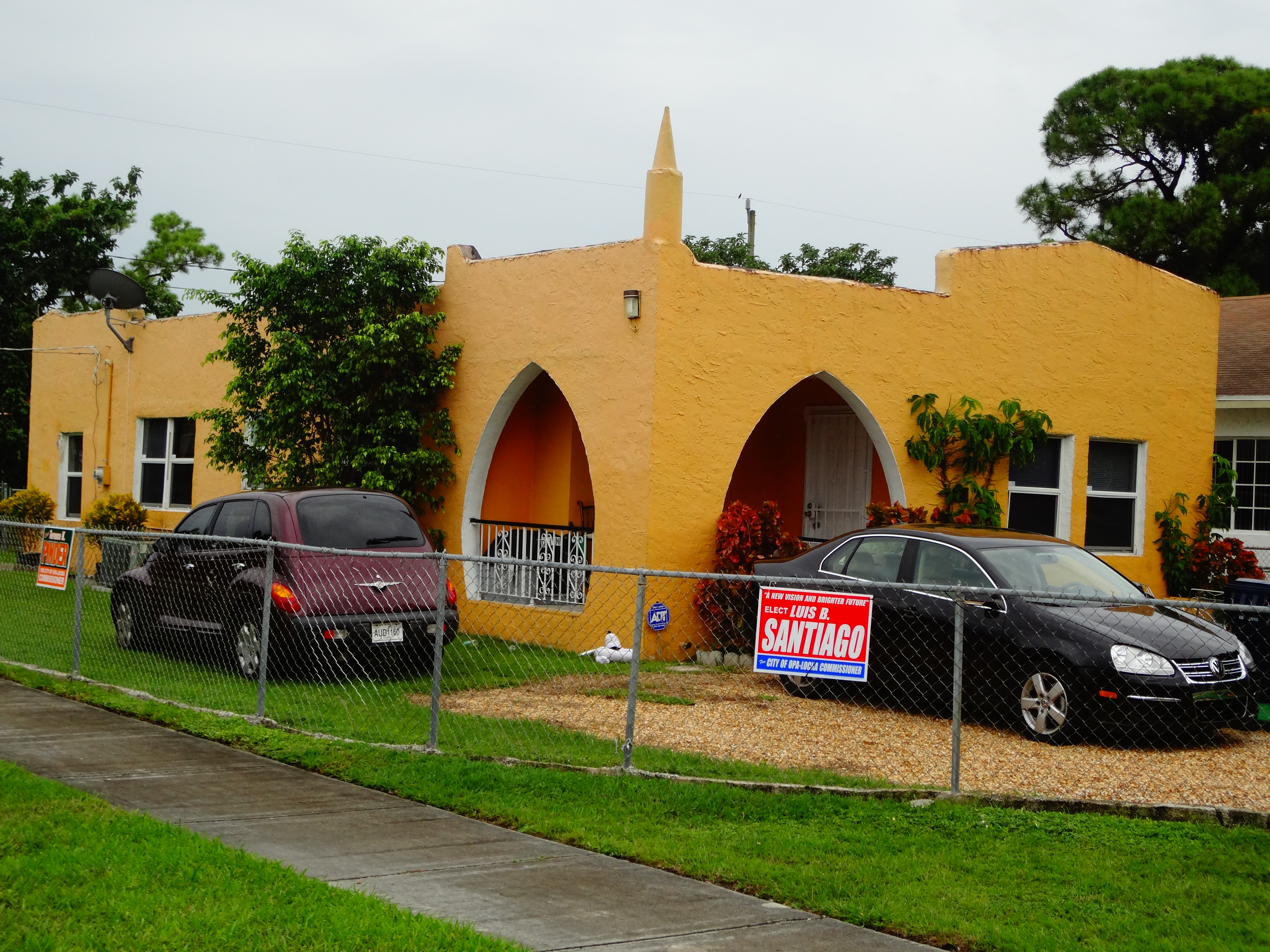
- The Crouse House in 2012

- Location within Florida Location within the United States
- Location: 1156 Peri St., Opa-Locka, Florida
- Coordinates: 25°54′33″N 80°14′56″W
- Area: 0.1 acres (0.040 ha)
- Built: 1926
- Architect: Muller, Bernhardt E.
- Architectural style: Moorish Revival
- MPS: Opa-Locka TR
- NRHP reference No.: 87001316
- Added to NRHP: August 17, 1987

The Crouse House, in Opa-Locka, Florida, was designed by architect Bernhardt E. Muller for owners J. W. and Jennie Crouse. The house includes Moorish Revival elements, and it was constructed in 1926 at the corner of Peri and Ahmed Streets in Opa-locka. The house is part of the Opa-locka Thematic Resource Area, and it was listed on the National Register of Historic Places August 17, 1987. Original features of the house included a bell tower at the Peri St. entrance and a dome above the garage entrance on Ahmad St., but neither feature survived numerous alterations.

Aviation pioneer Glenn Curtiss founded Opa-locka in 1925, and he hired architect Bernhardt Muller to design the community with a Moorish Revival motif inspired by stories from One Thousand and One Nights. Curtiss was not able to achieve Muller's vision for the community, although several sites were constructed.

== See also ==
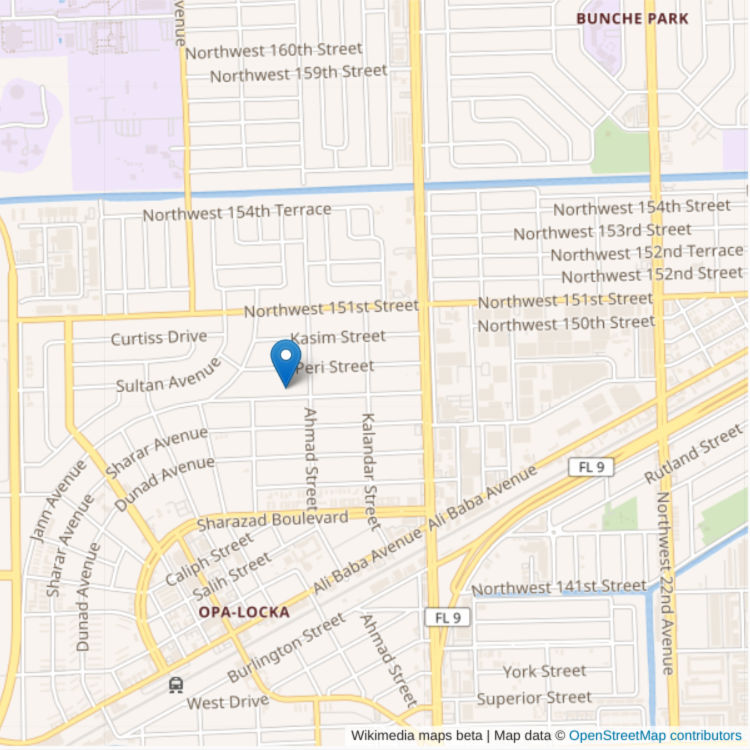
Location of the Crouse House in Opa-locka, Florida
