= Opa-locka station =

Railway station in Opa-locka, Florida

Opa-locka

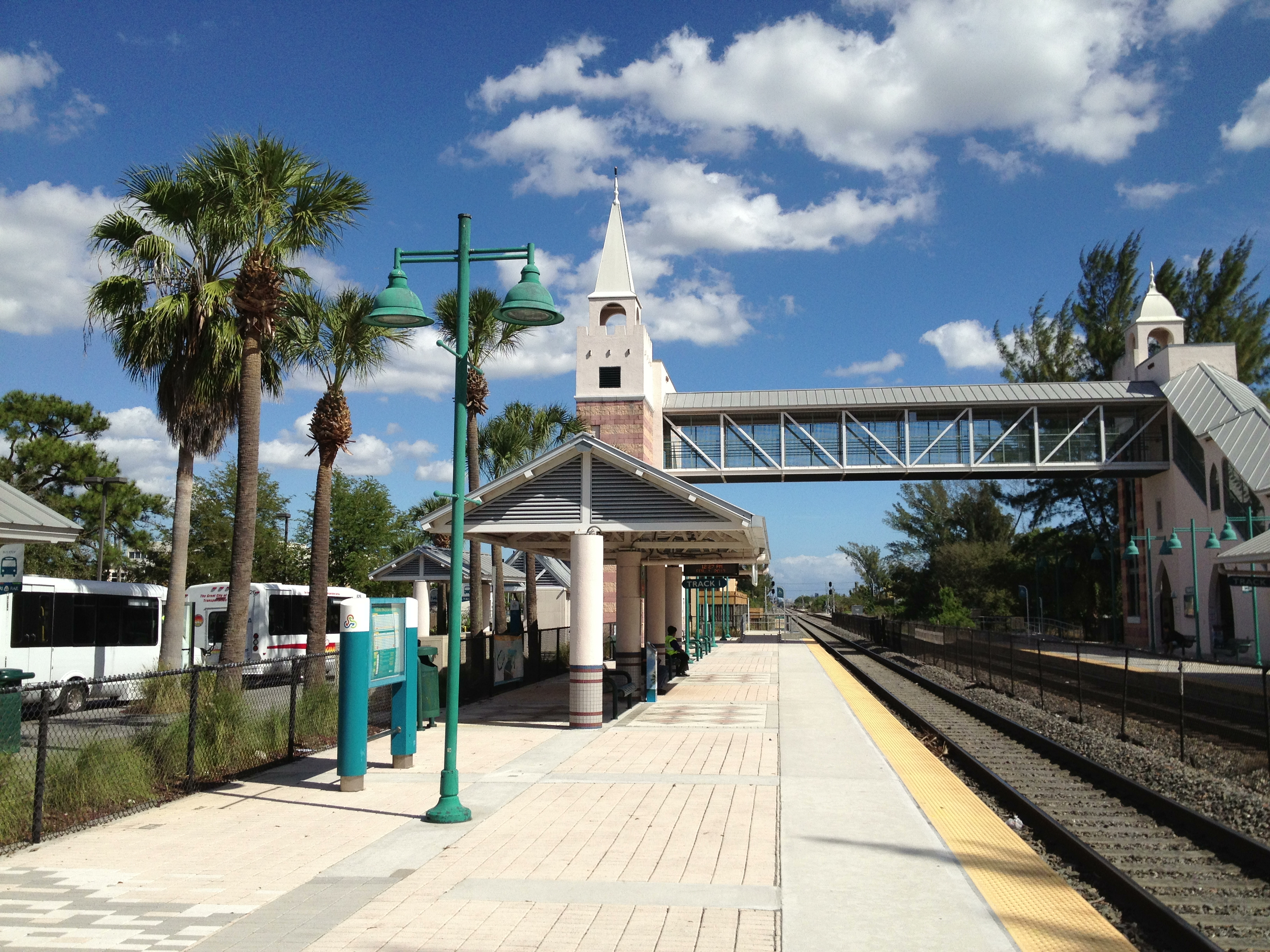
- Opa-locka station in February 2013

General information
- Location: 480 Ali Baba Avenue; Opa-locka, Florida
- Coordinates: 25°54′00″N 80°15′11″W
- Line: South Florida Rail Corridor
- Platforms: 2 side platforms
- Tracks: 2
- Connections: Metrobus: 32, 42, 135

Construction
- Parking: Yes
- Accessible: Yes

Other information
- Fare zone: Miami–Golden Glades

History
- Opened: 1927 (Seaboard Air Line); March 15, 1996 (Tri-Rail)

Services
Preceding station	Tri-Rail	Following station
Metrorail Transfer toward Miami Airport	Main Line	Golden Glades toward Mangonia Park
Express does not stop here
Former services
Preceding station	Seaboard Air Line Railroad	Following station
Hialeah toward Miami	Main Line	Hollywood toward Richmond
- Opa-locka Seaboard Air Line Railway Station
- U.S. National Register of Historic Places
- Interactive map of Opa-locka Seaboard Air Line Railway Station
- Location: Opa-locka, Florida
- Area: 1.5 acres (0.61 ha)
- Built: 1927
- Architect: Bernhardt E. Muller
- Architectural style: Moorish Revival architecture
- MPS: Opa-locka TR
- NRHP reference No.: 87000998
- Added to NRHP: June 25, 1987
Location

Opa-locka station is a Tri-Rail commuter rail station in Opa-locka, Florida. The station opened in 1996 next to the former Seaboard Air Line Railroad station building. It has two side platforms connected with a footbridge.

== History ==
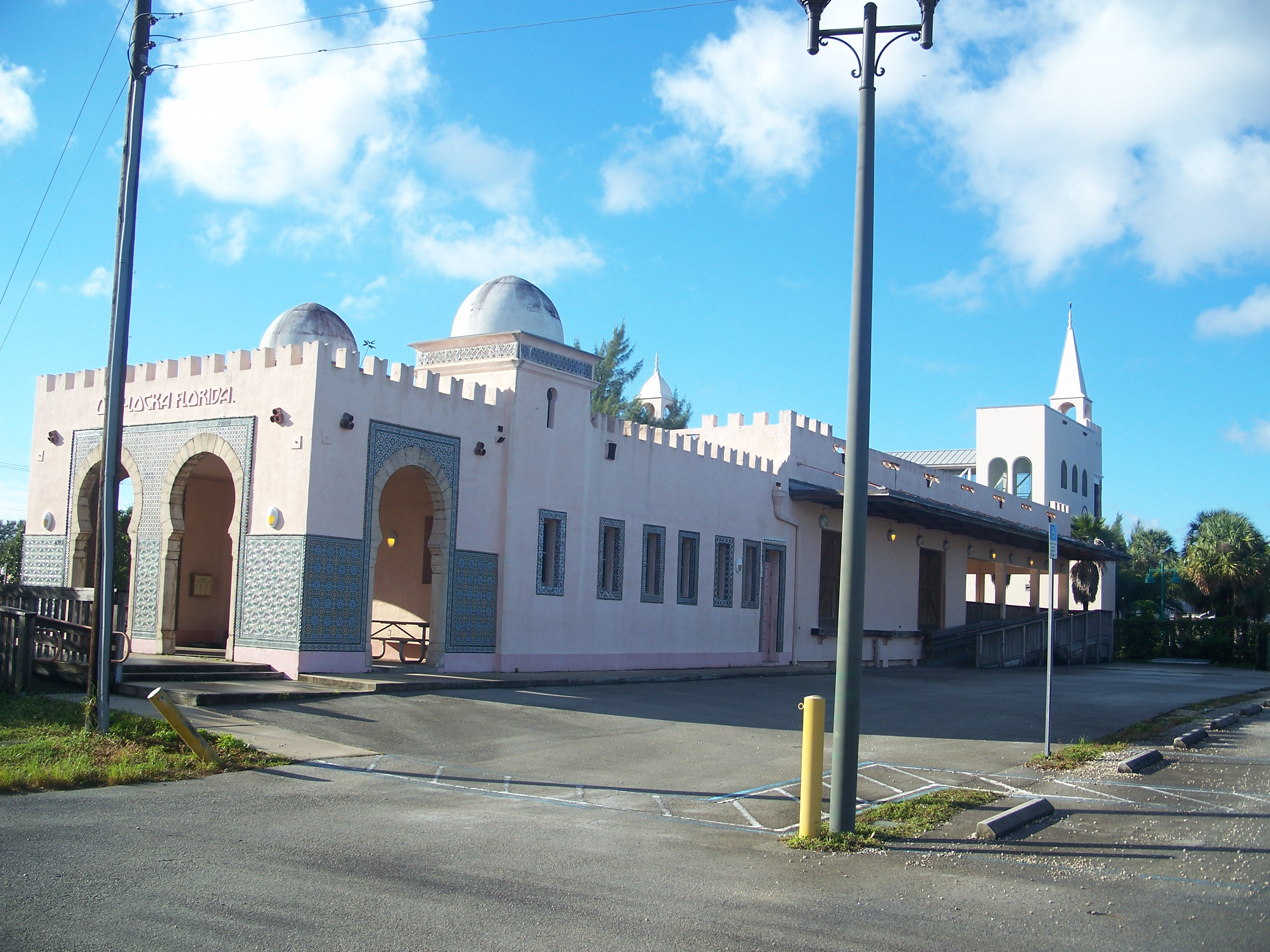
The former Seaboard Air Line Railroad station in 2010

Constructed in 1927, the former Seaboard Air Line Railroad station is typical of the Moorish Revival architecture prevalent throughout the city of Opa-locka. On June 25, 1987, it was added to the US National Register of Historic Places as Opa-locka Seaboard Air Line Railway Station. The property is part of the Opa-locka Thematic Resource Area, a multiple-property submission to the National Register.

The Tri-Rail station opened as an infill station on March 15, 1996, at a cost of $900,000.
