= Opa-locka Bank =

- U.S. National Register of Historic Places
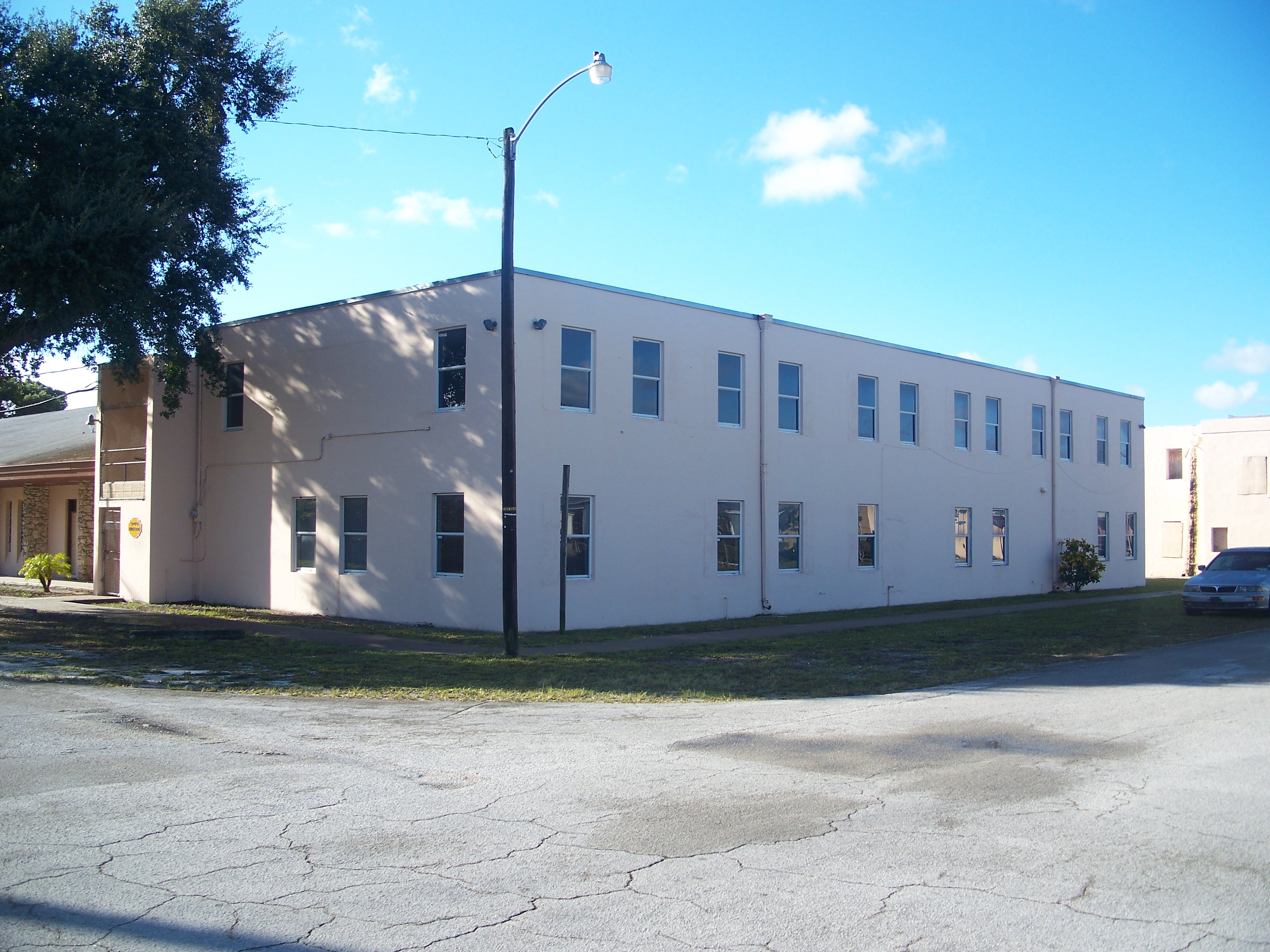

- Location within Miami Location within Florida Location within the United States
- Location: Opa-locka, Florida
- Coordinates: 25°54′21″N 80°15′1″W
- MPS: Opa-locka Thematic Resource
- NRHP reference No.: 83001420
- Added to NRHP: May 19, 1983

The Opa-locka Bank (also known as the First Baptist Church) is a historic bank in Opa-locka, Florida. It is located at 940 Caliph Street. On May 19, 1983, it was added to the U.S. National Register of Historic Places.

This property is part of the Opa-locka Thematic Resource Area, a multiple property submission to the National Register.
