= Harry Hurt Building =

- U.S. National Register of Historic Places
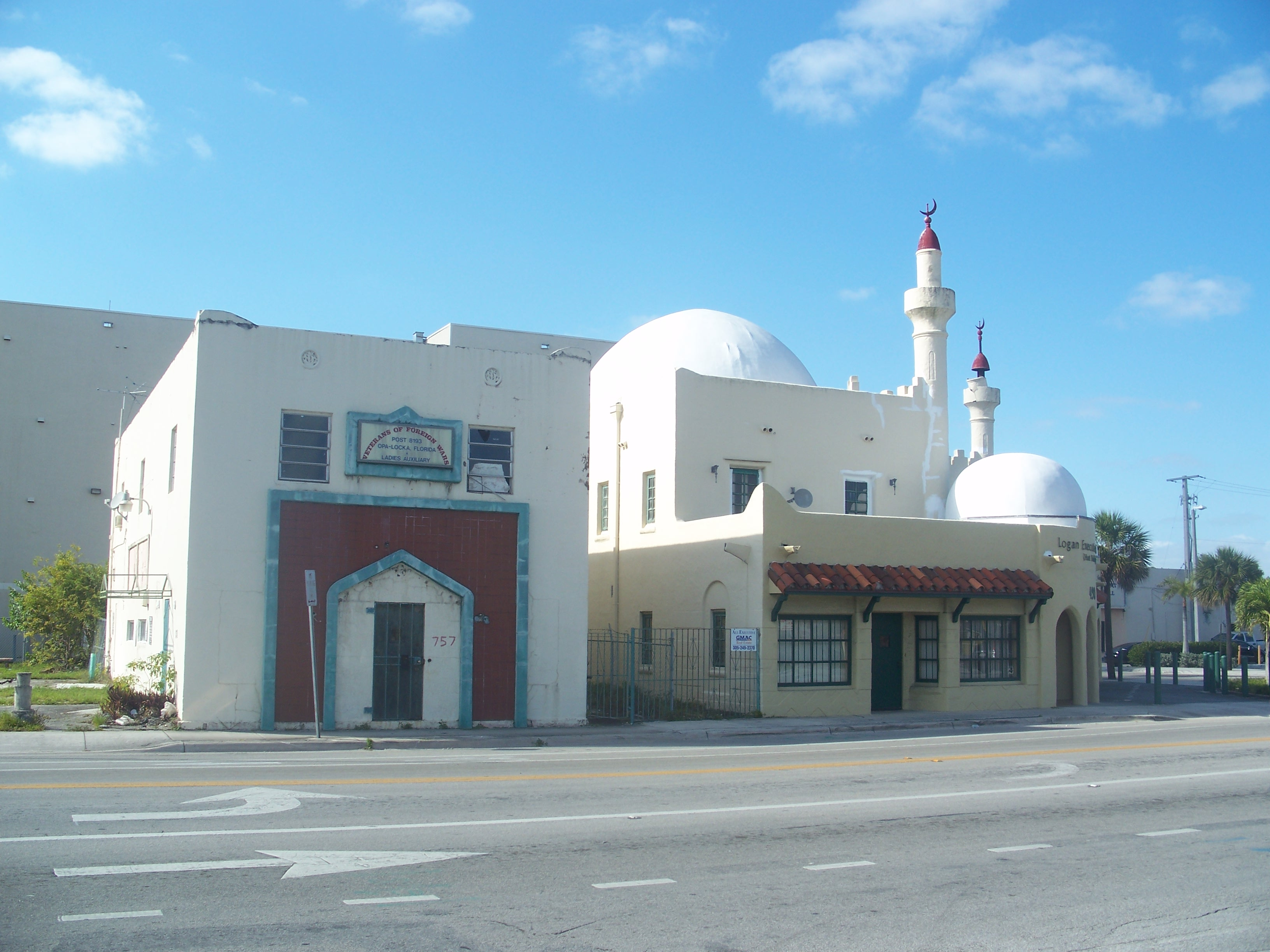

- Location within Miami Location within Florida Location within the United States
- Location: Opa-locka, Florida
- Coordinates: 25°54′5″N 80°15′4″W
- MPS: Opa-locka Thematic Resource
- NRHP reference No.: 82004795
- Added to NRHP: March 22, 1982

The Harry Hurt Building is a historic site in Opa-locka, Florida. It is located at 490 Opa-locka Boulevard, on the corner of Ali-Baba Avenue. On March 22, 1982, it was added to the U.S. National Register of Historic Places.

This property is part of the Opa-locka Thematic Resource Area, a Multiple Property Submission to the National Register.
