= Opa-locka Thematic Resource Area =

- U.S. National Register of Historic Places
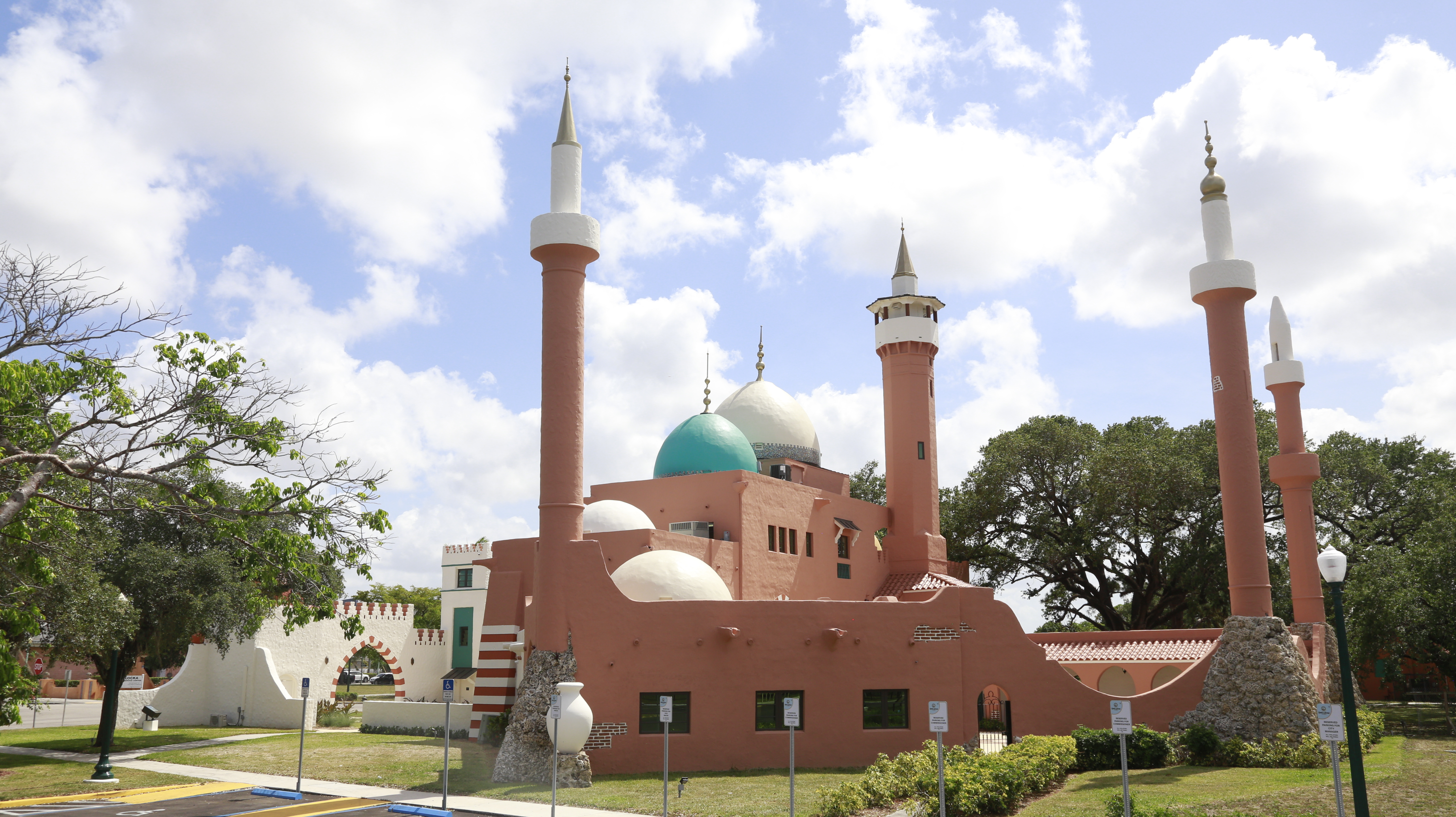
- Opa-locka Company Administration Building

- Location: Opa-locka, Miami-Dade County, Florida
- MPS
- NRHP reference No.: 64000117
- Added to NRHP: March 22, 1982

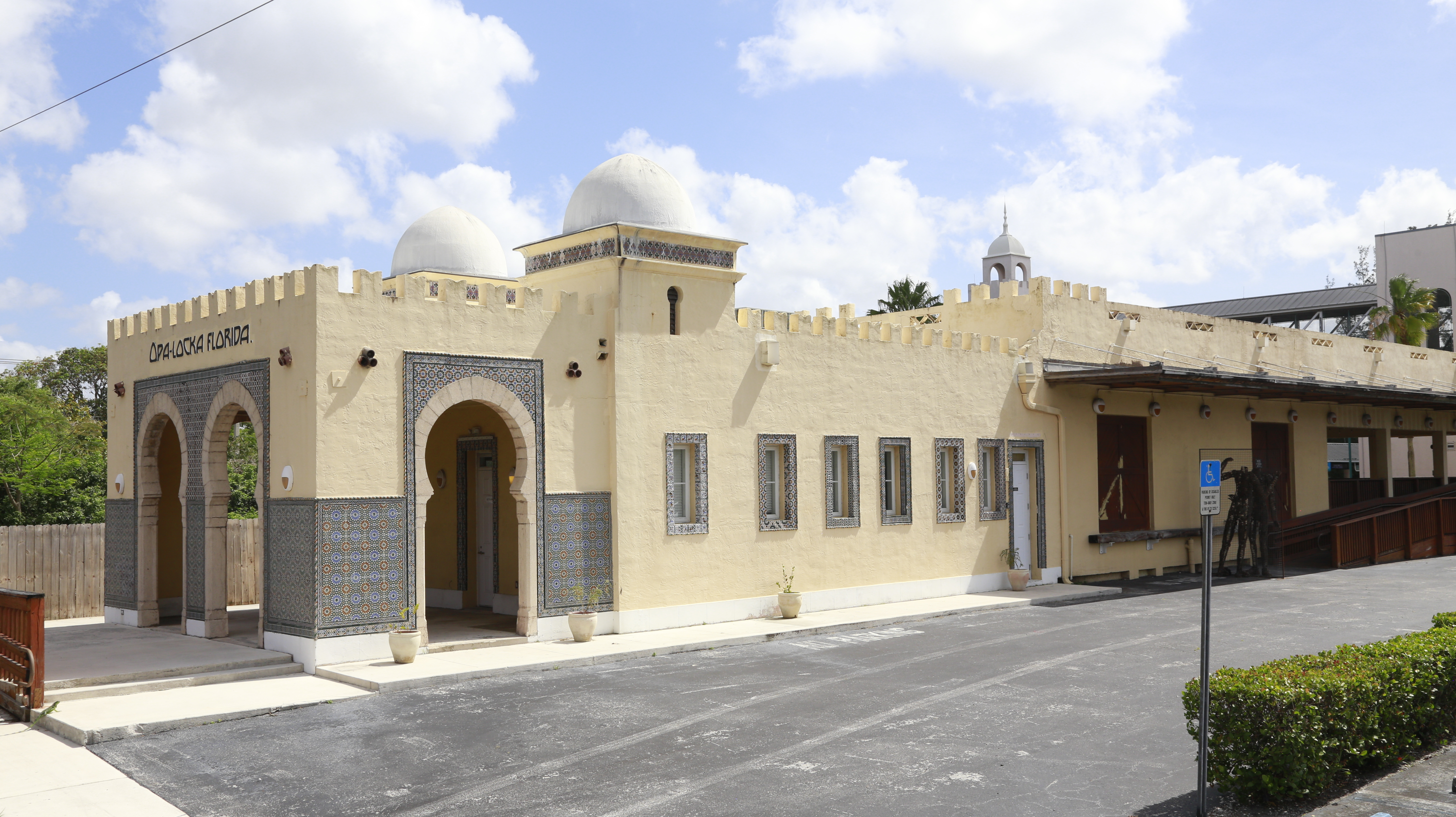
Historic Seaboard Air Line Opa-locka Railroad Station

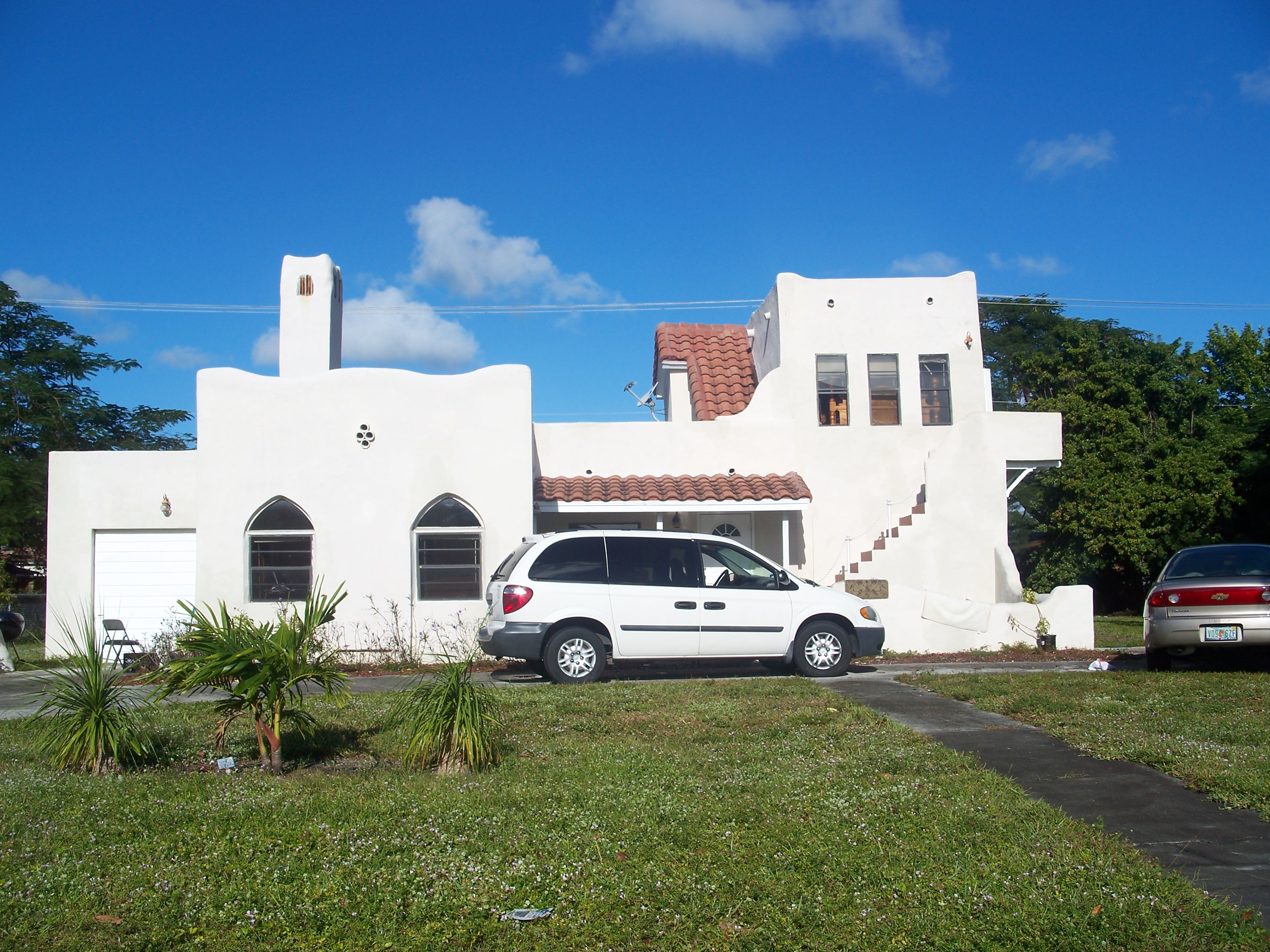
Long House

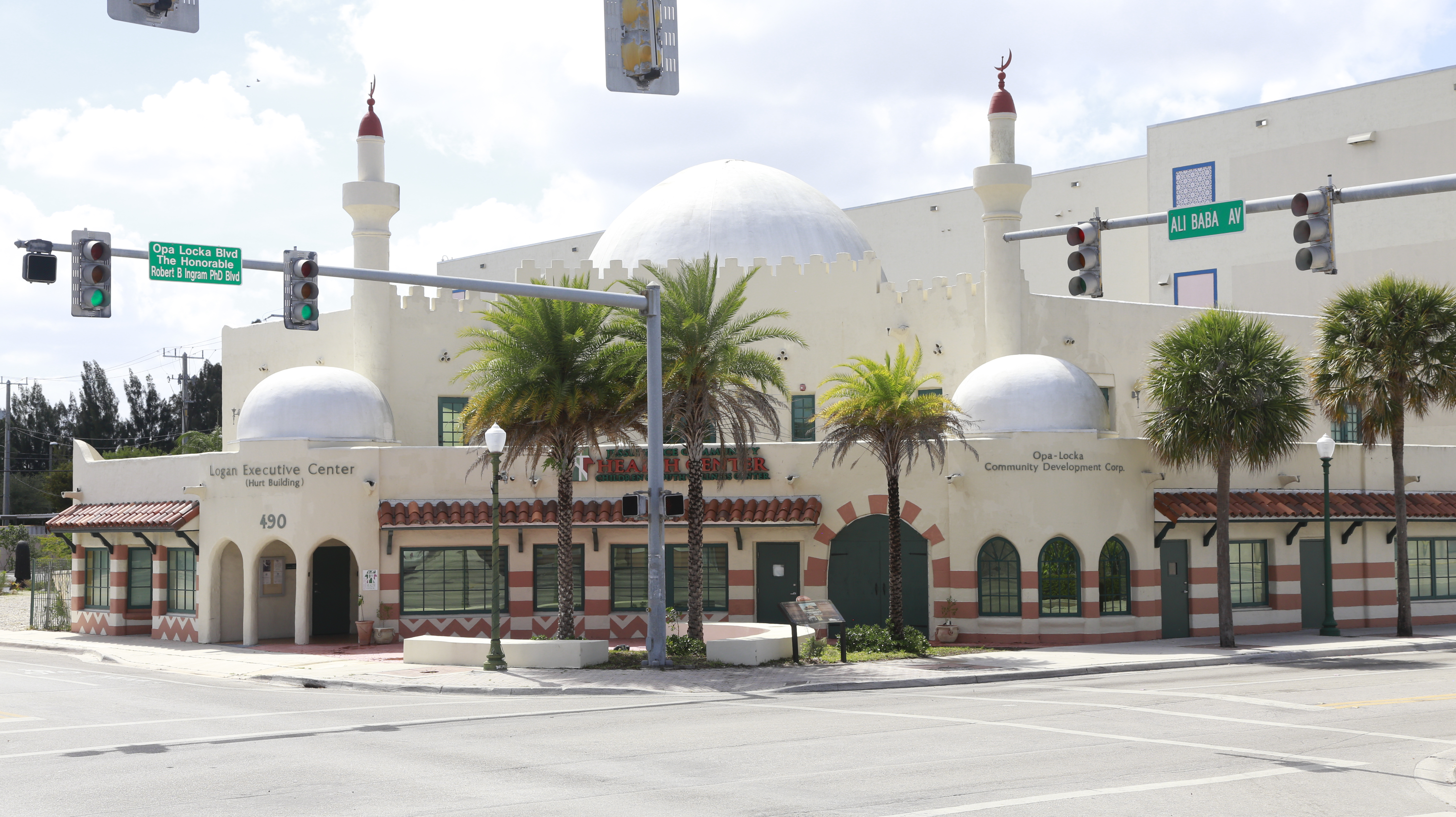
Hurt Business Center

The Opa-locka Thematic Resource Area is a group of thematically related historic sites in Opa-locka, Miami-Dade County, Florida, United States. The area comprises 17 surviving Moorish Revival buildings (originally 20 total previous to the 2000s) which are listed on the National Register of Historic Places. The buildings were designed between 1926 and 1928 by architect Bernhardt E. Muller as part of the themed development of Opa-locka by Glenn Hammond Curtiss, an aviation pioneer, and his development and sales company, Opa-locka Company. In developing Opa-locka, Curtiss sought to follow a theme inspired by the Arabian Nights. The designated buildings include the Opa-locka Company Administration Building, considered the anchor of the Opa-locka development, the Seaboard Air Line Opa-locka Railroad Station - Opa-locka station - and the development's first commercial building, the Harry Hurt Building.

== History of Opa-locka ==
After Glenn Curtiss, an aviation pioneer, retired from aircraft development and manufacturing in the 1920s, he became a real estate developer in Florida. In 1926, during the Florida land boom of the 1920s, Curtiss founded the Opa-locka project on 4.2 acres of land in northwestern Miami-Dade County, Florida. The Opa-locka Company was the development and sales company established by Curtiss for his Opa-locka project.

Curtiss named the development "Opa-tisha-wocka-locka", which meant "a big island covered with many trees and swamps." He shortened it to Opa-locka. Curtiss hired the American architect Bernhardt E. Muller to design the town in the themes of an "Arabian Fantasy" or "Arabian Nights." Some sources indicate that Curtiss was inspired by his viewing of the 1924 motion picture The Thief of Baghdad.

Muller designed over 80 buildings in Opa-locka in a Moorish Revival style. The buildings elements include onion-shaped domes, minarets, crenelated parapets, Saracenic arches, watchtowers, mosaic tile, and outdoor spiral staircases. The streets were given Arabian-related names, such as Ali Baba Avenue, Sharazad Avenue, Caliph Street, Sinbad Avenue, Sesame Street, and Aladdin Street.

The Administration Building has been described as "the anchor of the new city," and was designed by Muller as the headquarters for the Opa-locka Company. It was later used as Opa-locka's City Hall. The building has been called "The Nation's Weirdest City Hall", and was reported to have been inspired by the description of the palace of the Emperor Kosroushah in One Thousand and One Nights. The Administration Building includes "a dazzling array of domes, minarets, and arches, which combined to create a delightful oriental palace and afforded the appearance of a magical, fantasy city."

The 1926 Miami hurricane struck in September of that year and destroyed many of the original Moorish-style buildings, but some survived. Based on a survey and documentation prepared later in the twentieth century, twenty of the surviving structures have been listed on the National Register of Historic Places. The Opa-locka Company administration building is one of the listed buildings. Three other commercial buildings were listed on the National Register together.

== List of Nationally Registered Landmarks ==
The following buildings were added to the National Register of Historic Places as part of a Multiple Property Submission with the 1981 study, or later, consistently with the study guidelines of the Opa-locka Thematic Resource Area report.

Resource Name	Also Known As	Location	Added
Harry Hurt Building	Logan Executive Center	490 Ali-Baba Avenue; 25.901389°N 80.251111°W	March 22, 1982
Opa-locka Company Administration Building	Opa-locka City Hall	777 Sharazad Boulevard; 25.904722°N 80.253056°W	March 22, 1982
Opa-locka Bank	First Baptist Church	940 Caliph Street; 25.905833°N 80.250278°W	May 19, 1983
Opa-locka Railroad Station		490 Ali Baba Avenue; 25.900278°N 80.253333°W	June 25, 1987
H. W. Baird House	Edmunds House	401 Dunad Avenue; 25.903056°N 80.256111°W	August 17, 1987
George Cravero House	Lewis House	1011 Sharar Avenue; 25.907778°N 80.251389°W	August 17, 1987
J. W. Crouse House	Rey House	1156 Peri Street; 25.909167°N 80.248889°W	August 17, 1987
Clarence Etheredge House	Raad House	915 Sharar Avenue; 25.9075°N 80.2525°W	August 17, 1987
R. M. Griffiths House	Ortiz-Figueroa House	826 Superior Street; 25.898056°N 80.251111°W	August 17, 1987
S. K. Haislip House	Payon-Diaz House	1141 Jann Avenue; 25.908611°N 80.249167°W	August 17, 1987
Helm Stores and Apartments (DEMOLISHED)		1217 Sharazad Boulevard; 25.905°N 80.248056°W	August 17, 1987
Roy Helms House	Rose House	721 Sharar Avenue; 25.906667°N 80.254722°W	August 17, 1987
A. H. Higgins Duplex	Smith House	1210-1212 Sesame Street; 25.905556°N 80.248056°W	August 17, 1987
King Trunk Factory and Showroom (DEMOLISHED)	O'Dell Apartment House	951 Superior Street; 25.898611°N 80.248333°W	August 17, 1987
C. E. Long House	Peterman House	613 Sharar Avenue; 25.905833°N 80.255556°W	August 17, 1987
E. E. Root Building (DEMOLISHED)	Rondon Building	111 Perviz Avenue; 25.904167°N 80.253889°W	August 17, 1987
L. M. Taber Duplex	Brown House	1214-1216 Sesame Street; 25.905833°N 80.247778°W	August 17, 1987
W. A. Tinsman House	Morales House	1110 Peri Street; 25.909444°N 80.25°W	August 17, 1987
W. P. Tooker House	Quick House	811 Dunad Avenue; 25.906389°N 80.253333°W	August 17, 1987
H. Sayre Wheeler House	Riopelle House	1035 Dunad Avenue; 25.906667°N 80.250278°W	August 17, 1987

== The Opa-locka Heritage Trail in the Historic Downtown District ==
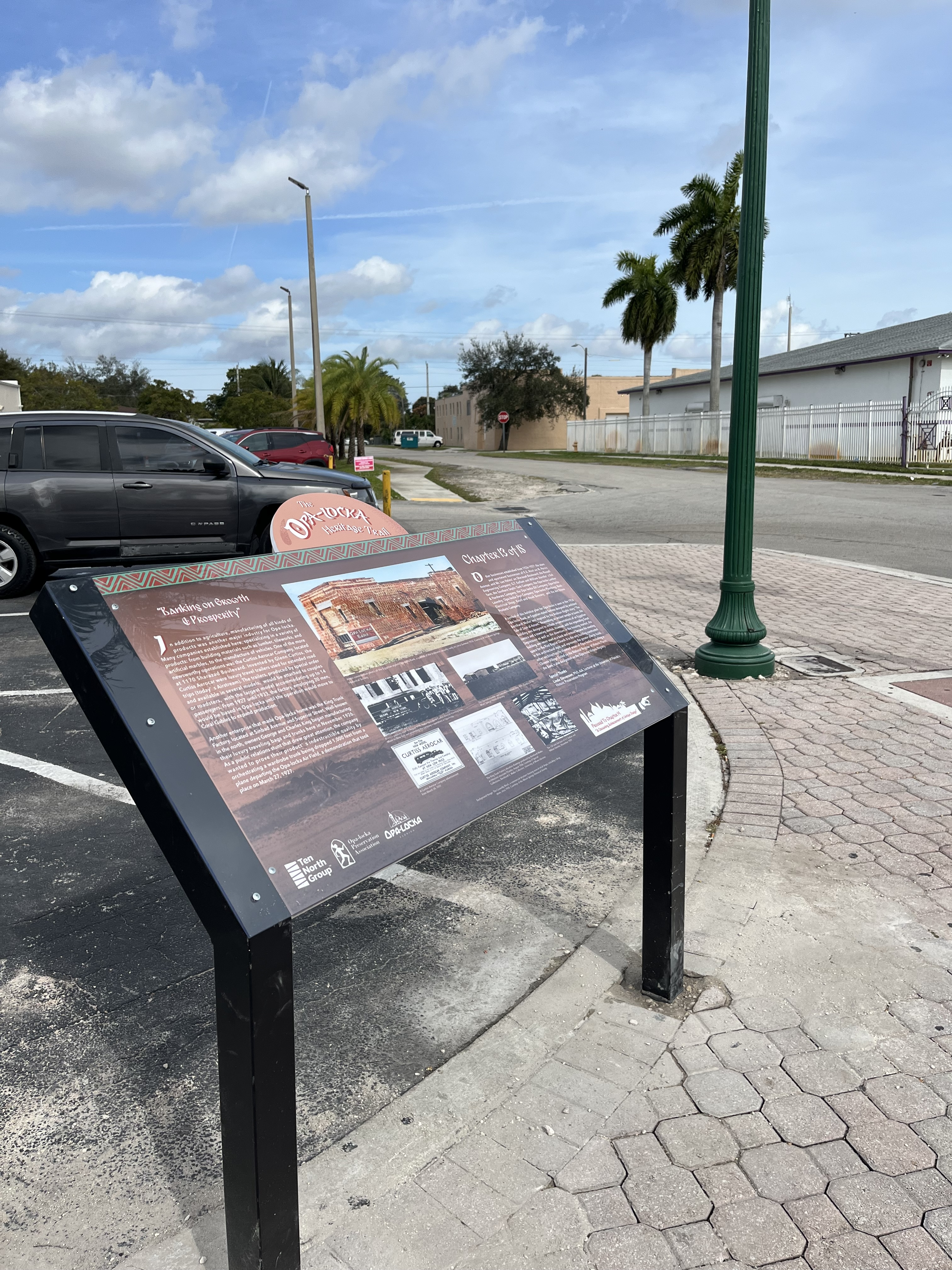
Opa-locka Heritage Trail

The Opa-locka Heritage Trail is a significant public outdoor installation made up of 15 "stations" that interpret and promote the founding history of the City of Opa-locka.

Developed as a curated and sequential storyline of the people, places, and themes that made Opa-locka America's Arabian Nights themed community, the Opa-locka Heritage Trail is the first permanent museum-like experience placed in the city boundaries in its 97-year history. Significant to the Trail is the inclusion of Opa-locka's Black history, the beginning of a larger initiative to document, assess, and preserve the Black communities contribution to the founding of the city, as well throughout the decades.

Of a unique design, the Trail includes designs, icons, and colors resurrected from original architectural drawings, watercolors, and marketing of the Opa-locka Company, Inc. Font selections were inspired by the city’s original source of inspiration, the Arabian Nights Entertainment novels, and sites were purposefully referred to as “chapters” to align with the grander storybook fantasy of the development’s concept. Additionally, several images can be seen on each marker, one of which per location has been colorized to help entice younger generations to interpret history.

As part of a larger program to reinvigorate the historic core of Opa-locka and part of the Thematic Resource Area, the Trail also features native landscaping around each site, with donations being provided from the generosity of Lowe’s Home Improvement in North Miami, Community Greening in Boca Raton, and Fairchild Garden’s Native Plant Network in Coral Gables.

Historic images, many of which have never been seen in public view, as well as stories long forgotten or newly told, had been sourced from a variety of resources, both at local institutions and archives, as well as platforms such as Newspapers.com. Most notably, thanks extends to the following for their support of the project’s curatorial approach: HistoryMiami, Miami-Dade Public Library System, Miami Springs Historical Society, the Curtiss Mansion, the Glenn Hammond Curtiss Museum, Miami-Dade County Historic Preservation Office, and the State of Florida archives.

The Opa-locka Heritage Trail was conceived and developed by Alex Van Mecl, founder of the Opa-locka Preservation Association, Vice Chair of the City of Opa-locka’s Historic Environmental Preservation Board, and an Opa-locka resident and historic homeowner. Funding was provided by Opa-locka non-profit Ten North Group, and fully supported and installed by the City of Opa-locka.

It was officially unveiled and commemorated on April 13, 2024 by the Opa-locka Mayor and City Commission.

== See also ==
- Curtiss & Bright, a partnership entity that also developed in this area
- National Register of Historic Places listings in Miami-Dade County, Florida
