= Opa-locka Company administration building =

- Opa-locka Company Administration Building
- U.S. National Register of Historic Places
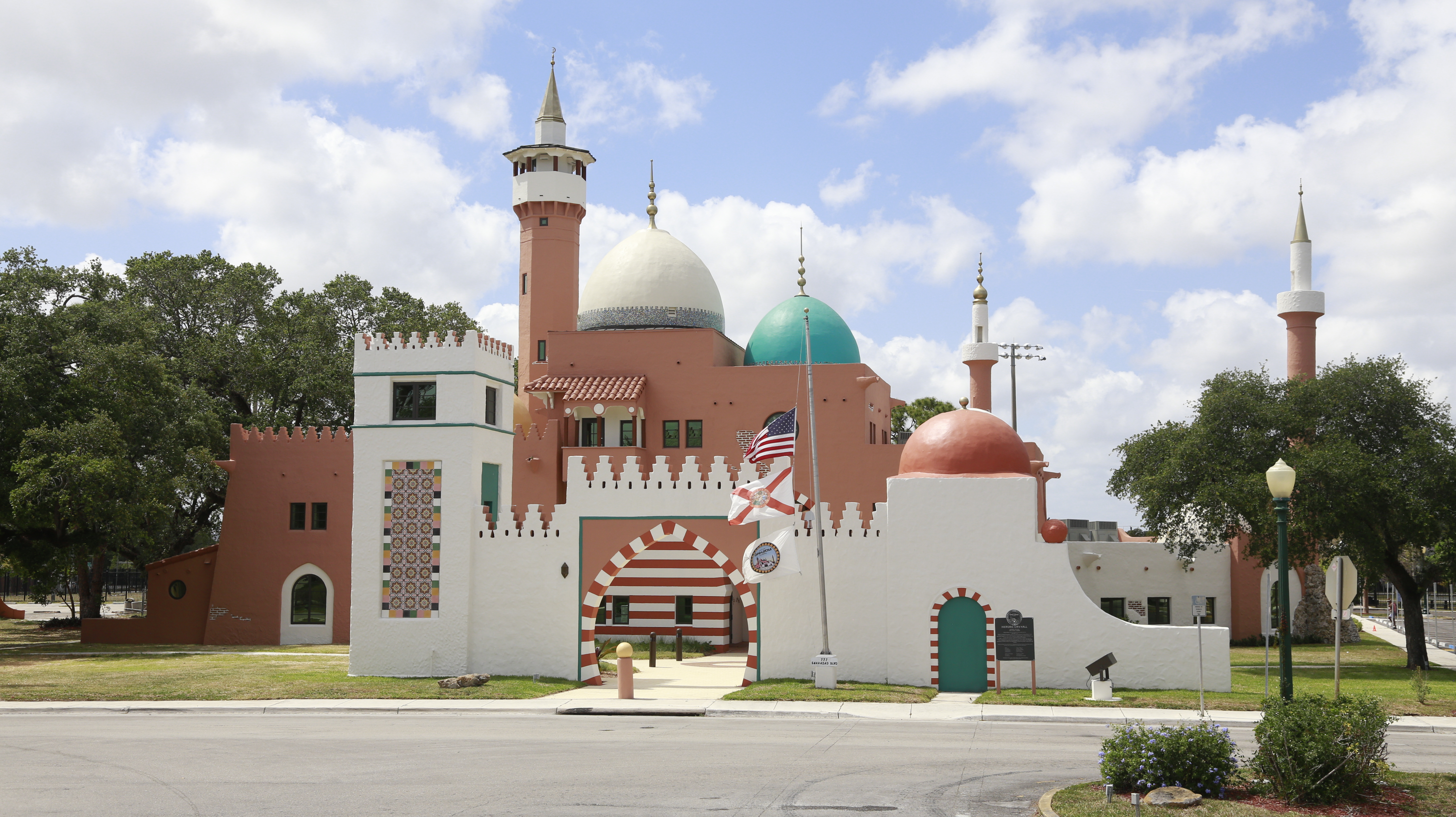
- Opa-locka Company Administration Building built in 1926 and designed by Opa-locka chief architect Bernhardt Emil Muller

- Location within Miami Location within Florida Location within the United States
- Location: Opa-locka, Florida
- Coordinates: 25°54′17″N 80°15′11″W
- MPS: Opa-locka Thematic Resource
- NRHP reference No.: 82004796
- Added to NRHP: March 22, 1982

The Opa-locka Company Administration Building is a historic site in Opa-locka, Florida. It is located at 777 Sharazad Boulevard. On March 22, 1982, it was added to the U.S. National Register of Historic Places.

This property is part of the Opa-locka Thematic Resource Area, a multiple-property submission to the National Register.
