= National Register of Historic Places listings in Miami-Dade County, Florida =

Location of Miami-Dade County in Florida

This is a list of the National Register of Historic Places listings in Miami-Dade County, Florida.

This is intended to be a complete list of the properties and districts on the National Register of Historic Places in Miami-Dade County, Florida, United States. The locations of National Register properties and districts for which the latitude and longitude coordinates are included below, may be seen in a map.

There are 196 properties and districts listed on the National Register in Miami-Dade County, including 6 National Historic Landmarks. The parts outside the city of Miami include 117 of these properties and districts, including 1 National Historic Landmark; they are listed here, while the properties in Miami are listed separately. One property, the Venetian Causeway, is split between Miami and Miami Beach, and is thus included on both lists. Another property was once listed but has been removed.

This National Park Service list is complete through NPS recent listings posted October 23, 2026.

Contents: Counties in Florida (non-linked contain no National Register listings)
Alachua - Baker - Bay - Bradford - Brevard - Broward - Calhoun - Charlotte - Citrus - Clay - Collier - Columbia - DeSoto - Dixie - Duval - Escambia - Flagler - Franklin - Gadsden - Gilchrist - Glades - Gulf - Hamilton - Hardee - Hendry - Hernando - Highlands - Hillsborough (Tampa) - Holmes - Indian River - Jackson - Jefferson - Lafayette - Lake - Lee - Leon - Levy - Liberty - Madison - Manatee - Marion - Martin - Miami-Dade (Miami) - Monroe - Nassau - Okaloosa - Okeechobee - Orange - Osceola - Palm Beach - Pasco - Pinellas - Polk - Putnam - St. Johns - St. Lucie - Santa Rosa - Sarasota - Seminole - Sumter - Suwannee - Taylor - Union - Volusia - Wakulla - Walton - Washington

== Current listings ==
	Name on the Register	Image	Date listed	Location	City or town	Description
1	Carl G. Adams House	Carl G. Adams House	November 1, 1985 (#85003464)	31 Hunting Lodge Court; 25°48′54″N 80°17′48″W	Miami Springs	Part of the Country Club Estates TR
2	Hervey Allen Study	Hervey Allen Study	May 7, 1974 (#74002256)	8251 Southwest 52nd Avenue; 25°41′47″N 80°16′36″W	South Miami	
3	William Anderson General Merchandise Store	William Anderson General Merchandise Store	October 18, 1977 (#77000402)	15700 Southwest 232nd Street, Southwest; 25°33′00″N 80°26′45″W	Goulds	
4	Anhinga Trail	Anhinga Trail	November 5, 1996 (#96001178)	Address Restricted; 25°22′54″N 80°36′35″W	Homestead	Part of the Archeological Resources of Everglades National Park MPS
5	Arch Creek Historic and Archeological Site	Arch Creek Historic and Archeological Site	July 15, 1986 (#86001700)	Address Restricted; 25°54′04″N 80°09′41″W	North Miami	
6	Baird House	Baird House	August 17, 1987 (#87001313)	401 Dunad Avenue; 25°54′11″N 80°15′22″W	Opa-locka	Part of the Opa-locka TR
7	Barry University Historic District	Barry University Historic District	December 23, 2019 (#100004782)	11300 NE Second Ave. 25°52′45″N 80°11′40″W	Miami Shores	
8	Beth Jacob Social Hall and Congregation	Beth Jacob Social Hall and Congregation	October 16, 1980 (#80000946)	301 and 311 Washington Avenue; 25°46′20″N 80°08′04″W	Miami Beach	
9	Boca Chita Key Historic District	Boca Chita Key Historic District	August 1, 1997 (#97000795)	Northwestern section of Boca Chita Key, roughly bounded by Biscayne Bay and a stone wall 25°31′29″N 80°10′34″W	Biscayne National Park	
10	Lily Lawrence Bow Library	Lily Lawrence Bow Library	August 5, 1996 (#96000823)	212 Northwest 1st Avenue; 25°28′17″N 80°28′47″W	Homestead	Part of the Homestead MPS
11	Building at 107 Northeast 96th Street	Building at 107 Northeast 96th Street	November 14, 1988 (#88002094)	107 Northeast 96th Street; 25°51′49″N 80°11′44″W	Miami Shores	Part of the Miami Shores TR
12	Building at 121 Northeast 100th Street	Building at 121 Northeast 100th Street	November 14, 1988 (#88002107)	121 Northeast 100th Street; 25°52′00″N 80°12′05″W	Miami Shores	Part of the Miami Shores TR
13	Building at 145 Northeast 95th Street	Building at 145 Northeast 95th Street	November 14, 1988 (#88002093)	145 Northeast 95th Street; 25°51′44″N 80°11′40″W	Miami Shores	Part of the Miami Shores TR
14	Building at 253 Northeast 99th Street	Building at 253 Northeast 99th Street	November 14, 1988 (#88002103)	253 Northeast 99th Street; 25°51′57″N 80°11′33″W	Miami Shores	Part of the Miami Shores TR
15	Building at 257 Northeast 91st Street	Building at 257 Northeast 91st Street	November 14, 1988 (#88002086)	257 Northeast 91st Street; 25°51′31″N 80°11′31″W	Miami Shores	Part of the Miami Shores TR
16	Building at 262 Northeast 96th Street	Building at 262 Northeast 96th Street	November 14, 1988 (#88002095)	262 Northeast 96th Street; 25°51′49″N 80°11′33″W	Miami Shores	Part of the Miami Shores TR
17	Building at 273 Northeast 98th Street	Building at 273 Northeast 98th Street	November 14, 1988 (#88002101)	273 Northeast 98th Street; 25°51′54″N 80°11′33″W	Miami Shores	Part of the Miami Shores TR
18	Building at 276 Northeast 98th Street	Building at 276 Northeast 98th Street	November 14, 1988 (#88002102)	276 Northeast 98th Street; 25°51′55″N 80°11′32″W	Miami Shores	Part of the Miami Shores TR
19	Building at 284 Northeast 96th Street	Building at 284 Northeast 96th Street	November 14, 1988 (#88002096)	284 Northeast 96th Street; 25°51′49″N 80°11′32″W	Miami Shores	Part of the Miami Shores TR
20	Building at 287 Northeast 96th Street	Building at 287 Northeast 96th Street	November 14, 1988 (#88002097)	287 Northeast 96th Street; 25°51′49″N 80°11′30″W	Miami Shores	Part of the Miami Shores TR
21	Building at 310 Northeast 99th Street	Building at 310 Northeast 99th Street	November 14, 1988 (#88002105)	310 Northeast 99th Street; 25°51′58″N 80°11′29″W	Miami Shores	Part of the Miami Shores TR
22	Building at 353 Northeast 91st Street	Building at 353 Northeast 91st Street	November 14, 1988 (#88002087)	353 Northeast 91st Street; 25°51′31″N 80°11′26″W	Miami Shores	Part of the Miami Shores TR
23	Building at 357 Northeast 92nd Street	Building at 357 Northeast 92nd Street	November 14, 1988 (#88002088)	357 Northeast 92nd Street; 25°51′34″N 80°11′26″W	Miami Shores	Part of the Miami Shores TR
24	Building at 361 Northeast 97th Street	Building at 361 Northeast 97th Street	November 14, 1988 (#88002100)	361 Northeast 97th Street; 25°51′52″N 80°11′26″W	Miami Shores	Part of the Miami Shores TR
25	Building at 384 Northeast 94th Street	Building at 384 Northeast 94th Street	November 14, 1988 (#88002091)	384 Northeast 94th Street; 25°51′41″N 80°11′24″W	Miami Shores	Part of the Miami Shores TR
26	Building at 389 Northeast 99th Street	Building at 389 Northeast 99th Street	November 14, 1988 (#88002106)	389 Northeast 99th Street; 25°51′58″N 80°11′25″W	Miami Shores	Part of the Miami Shores TR
27	Building at 431 Northeast 94th Street	Building at 431 Northeast 94th Street	November 14, 1988 (#88002092)	431 Northeast 94th Street; 25°51′42″N 80°11′20″W	Miami Shores	Part of the Miami Shores TR
28	Building at 477 Northeast 92nd Street	Building at 477 Northeast 92nd Street	November 14, 1988 (#88002089)	477 Northeast 92nd Street; 25°51′34″N 80°11′17″W	Miami Shores	Part of the Miami Shores TR
29	Building at 540 Northeast 96th Street	Building at 540 Northeast 96th Street	November 14, 1988 (#88002098)	540 Northeast 96th Street; 25°51′49″N 80°11′12″W	Miami Shores	Part of the Miami Shores TR
30	Building at 553 Northeast 101st Street	Building at 553 Northeast 101st Street	November 14, 1988 (#88002108)	553 Northeast 101st Street; 25°52′03″N 80°11′12″W	Miami Shores	Part of the Miami Shores TR
31	Building at 561 Northeast 101st Street	Building at 561 Northeast 101st Street	November 14, 1988 (#88002109)	561 Northeast 101st Street; 25°52′04″N 80°11′11″W	Miami Shores	Part of the Miami Shores TR
32	Building at 577 Northeast 96th Street	Building at 577 Northeast 96th Street	November 14, 1988 (#88002099)	577 Northeast 96th Street; 25°51′49″N 80°11′10″W	Miami Shores	Part of the Miami Shores TR
33	Building at 1291 Northeast 102nd Street	Building at 1291 Northeast 102nd Street	November 14, 1988 (#88002110)	1291 Northeast 102nd Street; 25°52′07″N 80°10′46″W	Miami Shores	Part of the Miami Shores TR
34	Building at 10108 Northeast 1st Avenue	Building at 10108 Northeast 1st Avenue	November 14, 1988 (#88002111)	10108 Northeast 1st Avenue; 25°52′03″N 80°11′45″W	Miami Shores	Part of the Miami Shores TR
35	Cadillac Hotel	Cadillac Hotel	October 5, 2005 (#05001117)	3925 Collins Ave. 25°48′48″N 80°07′22″W	Miami Beach	
36	Cape Florida Lighthouse	Cape Florida Lighthouse	September 29, 1970 (#70000180)	Southeast tip of Key Biscayne off U.S. Route 1; 25°39′58″N 80°09′22″W	Key Biscayne	
37	Cla-Reina Hotel	Cla-Reina Hotel	April 22, 2020 (#100004971)	116 Alhambra Circle; 25°45′10″N 80°15′30″W	Coral Gables	Later named "La Palma"
38	Clune Building	Clune Building	November 1, 1985 (#85003467)	45 Curtiss Parkway; 25°49′17″N 80°16′53″W	Miami Springs	Part of the Country Club Estates TR
39	Coco Plum Woman's Club	Coco Plum Woman's Club	June 17, 2005 (#05000598)	1375 Sunset Drive (SW 72nd Street); 25°42′24″N 80°16′49″W	Coral Gables	Part of the Clubhouses of Florida's Woman's Clubs MPS
40	Collins Waterfront Architectural District	Collins Waterfront Architectural District	December 15, 2011 (#11000905)	Bounded by 24th St., Atlantic Ocean, Indian Creek Dr., Pine Tree Dr. & Collins Canal; 25°47′43″N 80°07′53″W	Miami Beach	
41	Coral Castle	Coral Castle	May 10, 1984 (#84000840)	28655 South Federal Highway; 25°30′00″N 80°26′34″W	Homestead	
42	Coral Gables City Hall	Coral Gables City Hall	July 24, 1974 (#74000616)	405 Biltmore Way; 25°44′55″N 80°15′49″W	Coral Gables	
43	Coral Gables Congregational Church	Coral Gables Congregational Church	October 10, 1978 (#78000937)	3010 DeSoto Boulevard; 25°44′33″N 80°16′44″W	Coral Gables	
44	Coral Gables Elementary School	Coral Gables Elementary School	June 30, 1988 (#88000750)	105 Minorca Avenue; 25°45′13″N 80°15′28″W	Coral Gables	
45	Coral Gables House	Coral Gables House	April 13, 1973 (#73000573)	907 Coral Way; 25°44′56″N 80°16′26″W	Coral Gables	
46	Coral Gables Police and Fire Station	Coral Gables Police and Fire Station	November 6, 1984 (#84000354)	2325 Salzedo Street; 25°45′00″N 80°15′39″W	Coral Gables	
47	Coral Gables Woman's Club	Coral Gables Woman's Club	March 27, 1990 (#90000423)	1001 East Ponce de Leon Boulevard; 25°45′40″N 80°15′28″W	Coral Gables	
48	Cravero House	Cravero House	August 17, 1987 (#87001315)	1011 Sharar Avenue; 25°54′28″N 80°15′05″W	Opa-locka	Part of the Opa-locka TR
49	Crouse House	Crouse House	August 17, 1987 (#87001316)	1156 Peri Street; 25°54′33″N 80°14′56″W	Opa-locka	Part of the Opa-locka TR
50	Glenn Curtiss House	Glenn Curtiss House	December 21, 2001 (#85003579)	500 Deer Run; 25°48′35″N 80°17′01″W	Miami Springs	Part of the Country Club Estates TR
51	Lua Curtiss House I	Lua Curtiss House I	November 1, 1985 (#85003465)	85 Deer Run; 25°49′01″N 80°17′17″W	Miami Springs	Part of the Country Club Estates TR
52	Lua Curtiss House II	Lua Curtiss House II	November 1, 1985 (#85003466)	150 Hunting Lodge; 25°49′05″N 80°17′30″W	Miami Springs	Part of the Country Club Estates TR
53	Charles Deering Estate	Charles Deering Estate	March 11, 1986 (#86000325)	Southwest One Hundred Sixty-seventh Street and Old Cutler Road; 25°36′57″N 80°18′38″W	Cutler	
54	Douglas Entrance	Douglas Entrance	September 22, 1972 (#72000305)	Junction of Douglas Road and 8th Street Southwest; 25°45′49″N 80°15′21″W	Coral Gables	
55	Entrance to Central Miami	Entrance to Central Miami	January 19, 1989 (#88003199)	West of Red Road between Southwest 34th and Southwest 35th Streets; 25°44′10″N 80°17′06″W	Coral Gables	
56	Etheredge House	Etheredge House	August 17, 1987 (#87001317)	915 Sharar Avenue; 25°54′27″N 80°15′09″W	Opa-locka	Part of the Opa-locka TR
57	Thomas Faust House	Thomas Faust House	September 27, 1996 (#96001034)	69 Northwest 4th Street; 25°28′23″N 80°28′44″W	Homestead	Part of the Homestead MPS
58	Fisher-Sapero House		August 21, 2023 (#100008964)	9200 Carlyle Avenue; 25°52′47″N 80°07′32″W	Surfside	
59	Florida Pioneer Museum	Florida Pioneer Museum	August 14, 1973 (#73000574)	½ mile south of Lucy Street on State Road 27 (Krome Avenue); 25°27′20″N 80°28′40″W	Florida City	
60	Fontainebleau Hotel	Fontainebleau Hotel	December 22, 2008 (#08001318)	4441 Collins Avenue; 25°49′05″N 80°07′23″W	Miami Beach	
61	Fowey Rocks Light	Fowey Rocks Light	January 26, 2011 (#10001181)	Offshore in Straits of Florida 6.3 miles south southeast of Cape Florida on Key Biscayne, Florida; 25°35′26″N 80°05′48″W	Key Biscayne	(Light Stations of the United States MPS)
62	Fuchs Bakery	Fuchs Bakery	November 15, 1996 (#96001335)	102 South Krome Street; 25°28′07″N 80°28′42″W	Homestead	Part of the Homestead MPS
63	Fulford by the Sea Entrance	Fulford by the Sea Entrance	November 29, 2010 (#10000937)	Intersection of NE 172 Street and NE 23 Avenue; 25°56′05″N 80°09′15″W	North Miami Beach	
64	Gaylord House		October 4, 2021 (#100007060)	5208 Alton Rd. 25°49′46″N 80°07′47″W	Miami Beach	
65	Georgette's Tea Room		October 23, 2026 (#100013576)	2540 NW 51 Street; 25°49′15″N 80°14′22″W	Brownsville	
66	Giller Building	Giller Building	March 29, 2018 (#100002291)	975 W 41st St. 25°48′48″N 80°08′07″W	Miami Beach	
67	Grand Concourse Apartments	Grand Concourse Apartments	December 2, 1985 (#85003060)	421 Grand Concourse; 25°51′50″N 80°11′21″W	Miami Shores	
68	Griffiths House	Griffiths House	August 17, 1987 (#87001318)	826 Superior Street; 25°53′53″N 80°15′04″W	Opa-locka	Part of the Opa-locka TR
69	Haislip House	Haislip House	August 17, 1987 (#87001319)	1141 Jann Avenue; 25°54′31″N 80°14′57″W	Opa-locka	Part of the Opa-locka TR. Photo is not this house.
70	Helm Stores and Apartments	Helm Stores and Apartments	August 17, 1987 (#87001321)	1217 Sharazad Boulevard; 25°54′18″N 80°14′53″W	Opa-locka	Part of the Opa-locka TR
71	Helms House	Helms House	August 17, 1987 (#87001320)	721 Sharar Avenue; 25°54′24″N 80°15′17″W	Opa-locka	Part of the Opa-locka TR
72	Hialeah Park Race Track	Hialeah Park Race Track	March 5, 1979 (#79000664)	East 4th Avenue; 25°50′31″N 80°16′27″W	Hialeah	Determined to be eligible for National Historic Landmark status on January 12, 1988, but not made one (refnum 88003477).
73	Hialeah Seaboard Air Line Railway Station	Hialeah Seaboard Air Line Railway Station	July 14, 1995 (#95000854)	1200 Southeast 10th Court; 25°48′43″N 80°15′33″W	Hialeah	
74	Higgins Duplex	Higgins Duplex	August 17, 1987 (#87001322)	1210–1212 Sesame Street; 25°54′20″N 80°14′53″W	Opa-locka	Part of the Opa-locka TR
75	Homestead Historic Downtown District	Homestead Historic Downtown District	November 19, 2007 (#07001199)	Bounded by Northwest 4th Street, South Railroad Avenue, Southeast 1st Road, and N. Krome Drive; 25°28′12″N 80°28′37″W	Homestead	
76	Homestead Public School-Neva King Cooper School	Homestead Public School-Neva King Cooper School	December 4, 1985 (#85003112)	520 Northwest First Avenue; 25°28′28″N 80°28′48″W	Homestead	
77	Homestead Town Hall	Homestead Town Hall	November 7, 1997 (#97001327)	43 North Krome Avenue; 25°28′09″N 80°28′39″W	Homestead	Part of the Homestead MPS
78	Harry Hurt Building	Harry Hurt Building	March 22, 1982 (#82004795)	490 Ali-Baba Avenue; 25°54′05″N 80°15′04″W	Opa-locka	Part of the Opa-locka TR
79	Jones Family Historic District	Jones Family Historic District	October 23, 2013 (#13000846)	Biscayne National Park; 25°22′37″N 80°14′29″W	Islandia	
80	King Trunk Factory and Showroom	King Trunk Factory and Showroom	August 17, 1987 (#87001323)	951 Superior Street; 25°53′55″N 80°14′54″W	Opa-locka	Part of the Opa-locka TR
81	Lincoln Road Mall	Lincoln Road Mall	May 16, 2011 (#11000287)	400-1100 Lincoln Road, Washington Avenue to Alton Road; 25°47′26″N 80°08′11″W	Miami Beach	
82	Lindeman-Johnson House	Lindeman-Johnson House	November 15, 1996 (#96001332)	906 North Krome Avenue; 25°28′43″N 80°28′40″W	Homestead	Part of the Homestead MPS
83	Long House	Long House	August 17, 1987 (#87001324)	613 Sharar Avenue; 25°54′21″N 80°15′20″W	Opa-locka	Part of the Opa-locka TR
84	MacFarlane Homestead Historic District	MacFarlane Homestead Historic District	May 26, 1994 (#94000533)	Roughly bounded by Jefferson Street, Frow Avenue, Brooker Street, and Grand Avenue; 25°43′40″N 80°15′32″W	Coral Gables	
85	McMinn-Horne House	McMinn-Horne House	August 30, 1996 (#96000943)	25 Northeast 12th Street; 25°28′54″N 80°28′39″W	Homestead	Part of the Homestead MPS
86	Miami Beach Architectural District	Miami Beach Architectural District	May 14, 1979 (#79000667)	Roughly bounded by the Atlantic Ocean, Miami Beach Boulevard, Alton Road, and the Collins Canal; 25°47′02″N 80°07′52″W	Miami Beach	
87	Miami-Biltmore Hotel	Miami-Biltmore Hotel	September 27, 1972 (#72000306)	1210 Anastasia Avenue; 25°44′28″N 80°16′45″W	Coral Gables	
88	Millard-McCarty House	Millard-McCarty House	April 22, 1986 (#86000872)	424 Hunting Lodge; 25°49′04″N 80°17′43″W	Miami Springs	Part of the Country Club Estates TR
89	Monroe Lake Archeological District		November 5, 1996 (#96001184)	Address Restricted	Homestead	Part of the Archeological Resources of Everglades National Park MPS
90	Monticello Hotel	Monticello Hotel	October 11, 2017 (#100001737)	210 W. 63rd St. 25°50′40″N 80°07′17″W	Miami Beach	
91	Nike Missile Site HM-69	Nike Missile Site HM-69	July 27, 2004 (#04000758)	Long Pine Key Road; 25°22′11″N 80°41′05″W	Homestead	
92	Normandy Isles Historic District	Normandy Isles Historic District	November 12, 2008 (#08001041)	Roughly by Normandy Shores Golf Course, Indian Creek, Biscayne Bay, Rue Versailles, 71st., and Rue Notre Dame; 25°51′18″N 80°07′52″W	Miami Beach	
93	North Beach Bandshell	North Beach Bandshell	August 11, 2022 (#100007981)	7275 Collins Ave. 25°51′29″N 80°07′13″W	Miami Beach	
94	North Shore Historic District	North Shore Historic District	November 18, 2009 (#09000926)	Roughly by 87th Street, Collins Avenue, 73rd Street, and Hawthorne Avenue; 25°51′50″N 80°07′29″W	Miami Beach	
95	Ocean Spray Hotel	Ocean Spray Hotel	June 2, 2004 (#04000564)	4130 Collins Avenue; 25°48′54″N 80°07′12″W	Miami Beach	
96	Offshore Reefs Archeological District		August 24, 1984 (#84000838)	Address Restricted	Homestead	
97	Old Spanish Monastery	Old Spanish Monastery	November 9, 1972 (#72000307)	16711 West Dixie Highway; 25°55′45″N 80°09′17″W	North Miami Beach	
98	Opa-locka Bank	Opa-locka Bank	May 19, 1983 (#83001420)	940 Caliph Street; 25°54′21″N 80°15′01″W	Opa-locka	Part of the Opa-locka TR
99	Opa-locka Company Administration Building	Opa-locka Company Administration Building	March 22, 1982 (#82004796)	777 Sharazad Boulevard; 25°54′17″N 80°15′11″W	Opa-locka	Part of the Opa-locka TR
100	Opa-locka Railroad Station	Opa-locka Railroad Station	June 25, 1987 (#87000998)	490 Ali Baba Avenue; 25°54′01″N 80°15′12″W	Opa-locka	Part of the Opa-locka TR
101	Osceola Apartment Hotel	Osceola Apartment Hotel	November 1, 1985 (#85003469)	200 Azure Way; 25°49′08″N 80°17′08″W	Miami Springs	Part of the Country Club Estates TR
102	Parrot Jungle Historic District	Parrot Jungle Historic District	October 17, 2011 (#11000735)	11000 SW 57th Avenue; 25°40′10″N 80°17′09″W	Pinecrest	
103	Populo	Populo	June 15, 2006 (#06000498)	Biscayne National Park; 25°21′51″N 80°09′41″W	Homestead	Part of the 1733 Spanish Plate Fleet Shipwrecks MPS
104	Root Building	Root Building	August 17, 1987 (#87001326)	111 Perviz Avenue; 25°54′15″N 80°15′14″W	Opa-locka	Part of the Opa-locka TR
105	Seminole Cafe and Hotel	Seminole Cafe and Hotel	July 10, 2008 (#08000641)	55 South Flagler Avenue; 25°28′10″N 80°28′35″W	Homestead	
106	Shark River Slough Archeological District	Shark River Slough Archeological District	November 5, 1996 (#96001181)	Address Restricted	Homestead	Part of the Archeological Resources of Everglades National Park MPS
107	Silver Palm Schoolhouse	Silver Palm Schoolhouse	July 2, 1987 (#87000581)	Silver Palm Drive and Newton Road; 25°33′03″N 80°26′43″W	Goulds	
108	Sunshine State Arch	Sunshine State Arch	May 19, 2014 (#14000210)	Jct. of NW. 13th Ave. and NW. 167th St. 25°55′37″N 80°13′18″W	Miami Gardens	
109	Sweeting Homestead		September 19, 1997 (#97001088)	Address Restricted	Biscayne National Park	
110	Taber Duplex	Taber Duplex	August 17, 1987 (#87001327)	1214–1216 Sesame Street; 25°54′21″N 80°14′52″W	Opa-locka	Part of the Opa-locka TR
111	Arden "Doc" Thomas House	Arden "Doc" Thomas House	June 13, 2014 (#14000320)	5530 Sunset Dr. 25°42′14″N 80°17′03″W	South Miami	
112	Tinsman House	Tinsman House	August 17, 1987 (#87001328)	1110 Peri Street; 25°54′34″N 80°15′00″W	Opa-locka	Part of the Opa-locka TR
113	Tooker House	Tooker House	August 17, 1987 (#87001329)	811 Dunad Avenue; 25°54′23″N 80°15′12″W	Opa-locka	Part of the Opa-locka TR
114	Venetian Causeway	Venetian Causeway	July 13, 1989 (#89000852)	Northeast 15th Street and Dade Boulevard; 25°47′21″N 80°11′21″W	Miami Beach	Extends into Miami
115	Venetian Pool	Venetian Pool	August 20, 1981 (#81000193)	2701 De Soto Boulevard; 25°44′46″N 80°16′27″W	Coral Gables	
116	Vizcaya	Vizcaya	September 29, 1970 (#70000181)	3251 South Miami Avenue; 25°44′40″N 80°12′38″W	Miami	Historic house and grounds
117	Wheeler House	Wheeler House	August 17, 1987 (#87001330)	1035 Dunad Avenue; 25°54′24″N 80°15′01″W	Opa-locka	Part of the Opa-locka TR

== Former listing ==
	Name on the Register	Image	Date listed	Date removed	Location	City or town	Description
1	Hequembourg House	Hequembourg House	November 1, 1985 (#85003468)	January 18, 2011	851 Hunting Lodge; 25°48′45″N 80°17′51″W	Miami Springs	Part of the Country Club Estates TR. Significantly damaged by Hurricane Wilma in 2005. Subsequently demolished on October 1, 2010.

== See also ==
- List of National Historic Landmarks in Florida
- National Register of Historic Places listings in Florida
