= Miami Shores Thematic Resource =

- U.S. National Register of Historic Places
- Location: Miami Shores, Miami-Dade County, Florida
- MPS
- NRHP reference No.: 64000116
- Added to NRHP: November 14, 1988

The Miami Shores Thematic Resource — in Miami Shores, Miami-Dade County, Florida

== List ==
The following buildings were added to the National Register of Historic Places as part of the Miami Shores Multiple Property Submission (or MPS).

Resource Name	Also known as	Address	Added
Building at 10108 Northeast 1st Avenue	Shoreland Company-Mode Home	10108 Northeast 1st Avenue	November 14, 1988
Building at 107 Northeast 96th Street	Shoreland Company-House No. 1	107 Northeast 96th Street	November 14, 1988
Building at 121 Northeast 100th Street		121 Northeast 100th Street	November 14, 1988
Building at 1291 Northeast 102nd Street		1291 Northeast 102nd Street	November 14, 1988
Building at 145 Northeast 95th Street	Shoreland Company-House No. 9	145 Northeast 95th Street	November 14, 1988
Building at 253 Northeast 99th Street	Shoreland Company-House No. 405	253 Northeast 99th Street	November 14, 1988
Building at 257 Northeast 91st Street	Shoreland Company House Number 6	257 Northeast 91st Street	November 14, 1988
Building at 262 Northeast 96th Street	Shoreland Company-House No. 3	262 Northeast 96th Street	November 14, 1988
Building at 273 Northeast 98th Street	Shoreland Company-House No. 18	273 Northeast 98th Street	November 14, 1988
Building at 276 Northeast 98th Street		276 Northeast 98th Street	November 14, 1988
Building at 284 Northeast 96th Street		284 Northeast 96th Street	November 14, 1988
Building at 287 Northeast 96th Street		287 Northeast 96th Street	November 14, 1988
Building at 310 Northeast 99th Street	Shoreland Company-House No. 19	310 Northeast 99th Street	November 14, 1988
Building at 353 Northeast 91st Street		353 Northeast 91st Street	November 14, 1988
Building at 357 Northeast 92nd Street	Shoreland Company Residence No. 1035	357 Northeast 92nd Street	November 14, 1988
Building at 361 Northeast 97th Street	Shoreland Company-House No. 8	361 Northeast 97th Street	November 14, 1988
Building at 384 Northeast 94th Street	Shoreland Company-House No. 12	384 Northeast 94th Street	November 14, 1988
Building at 389 Northeast 99th Street		389 Northeast 99th Street	November 14, 1988
Building at 431 Northeast 94th Street		431 Northeast 94th Street	November 14, 1988
Building at 477 Northeast 92nd Street	Shoreland Company-Residence No. 526	477 Northeast 92nd Street	November 14, 1988
Building at 540 Northeast 96th Street	Shoreland Company-Residence No. 101	540 Northeast 96th Street	November 14, 1988
Building at 553 Northeast 101st Street		553 Northeast 101st Street	November 14, 1988
Building at 561 Northeast 101st Street		561 Northeast 101st Street	November 14, 1988
Building at 577 Northeast 96th Street	Shoreland Company-Residence No. 105	577 Northeast 96th Street	November 14, 1988

== Gallery ==
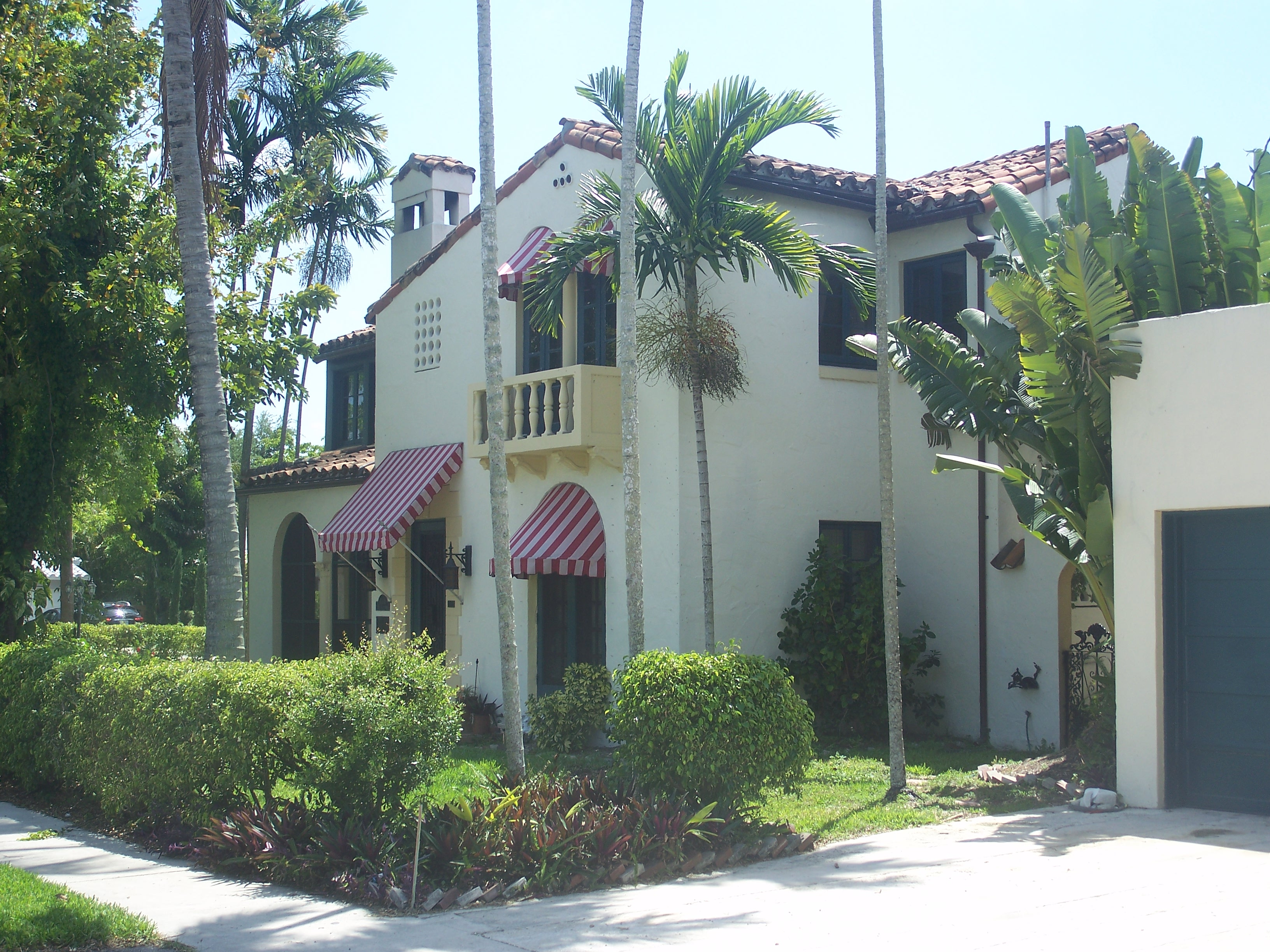
Building at 10108 NE 1st Avenue

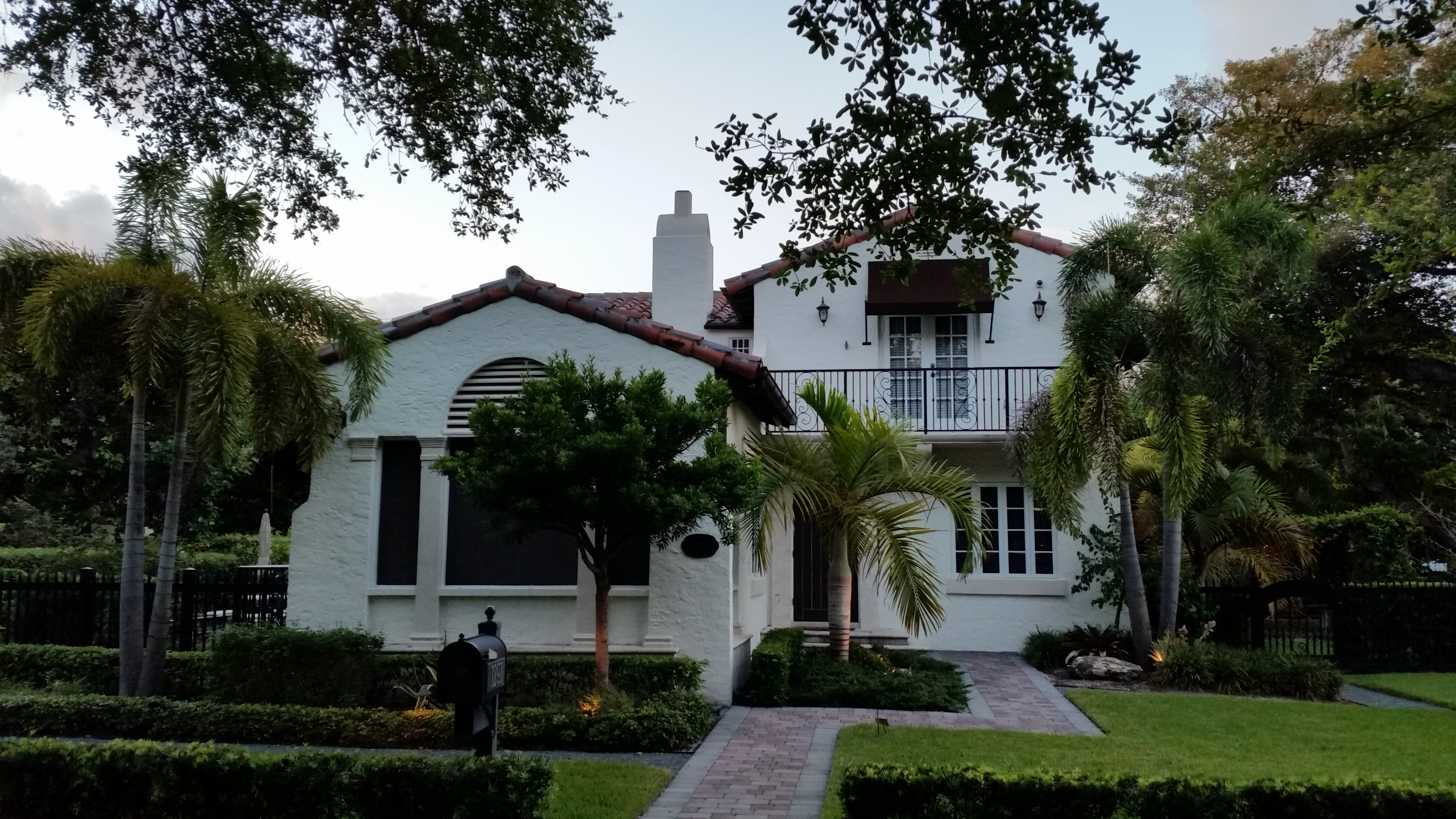
Building at 1291 Northeast 102nd Street

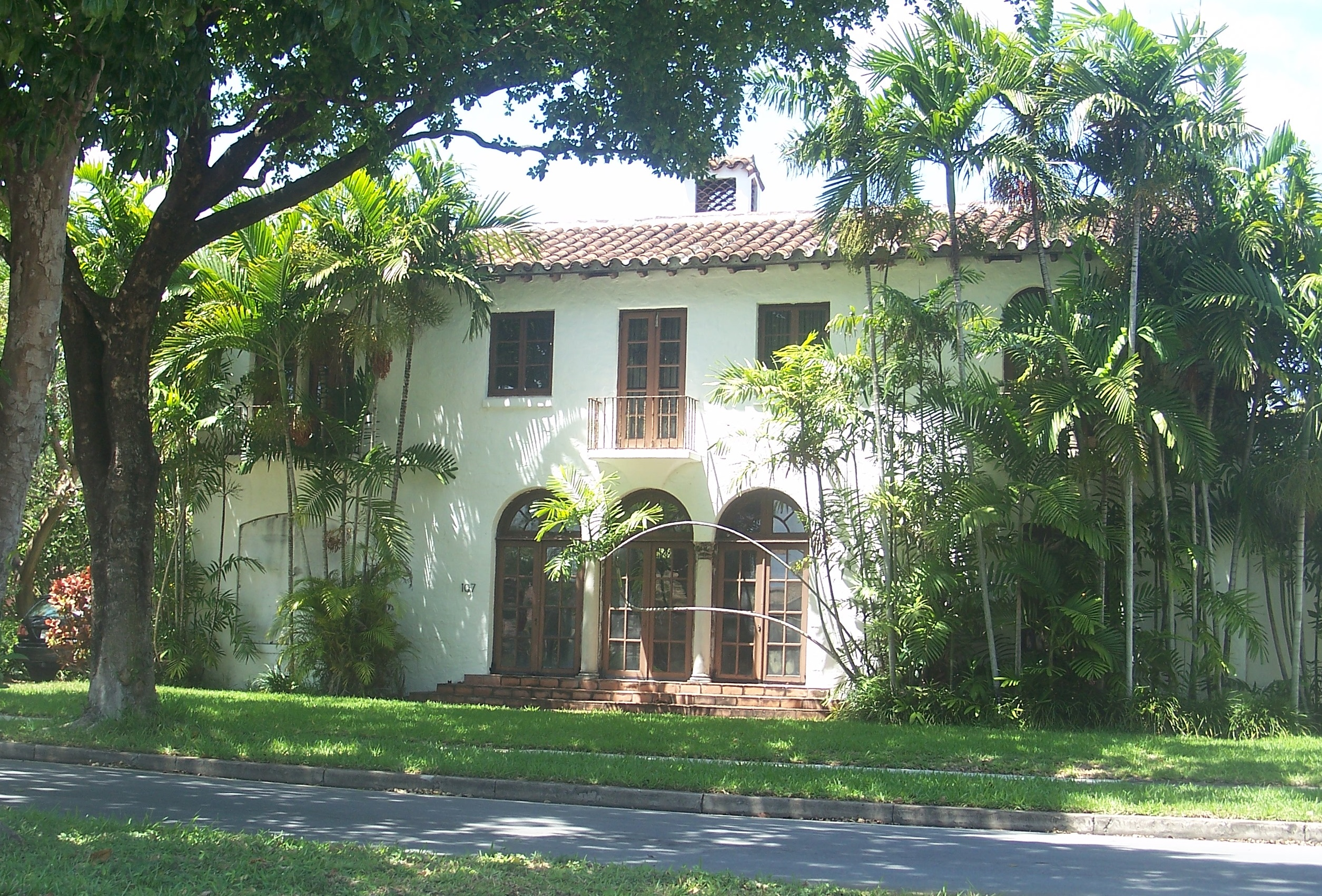
Building at 107 NE 96th Street

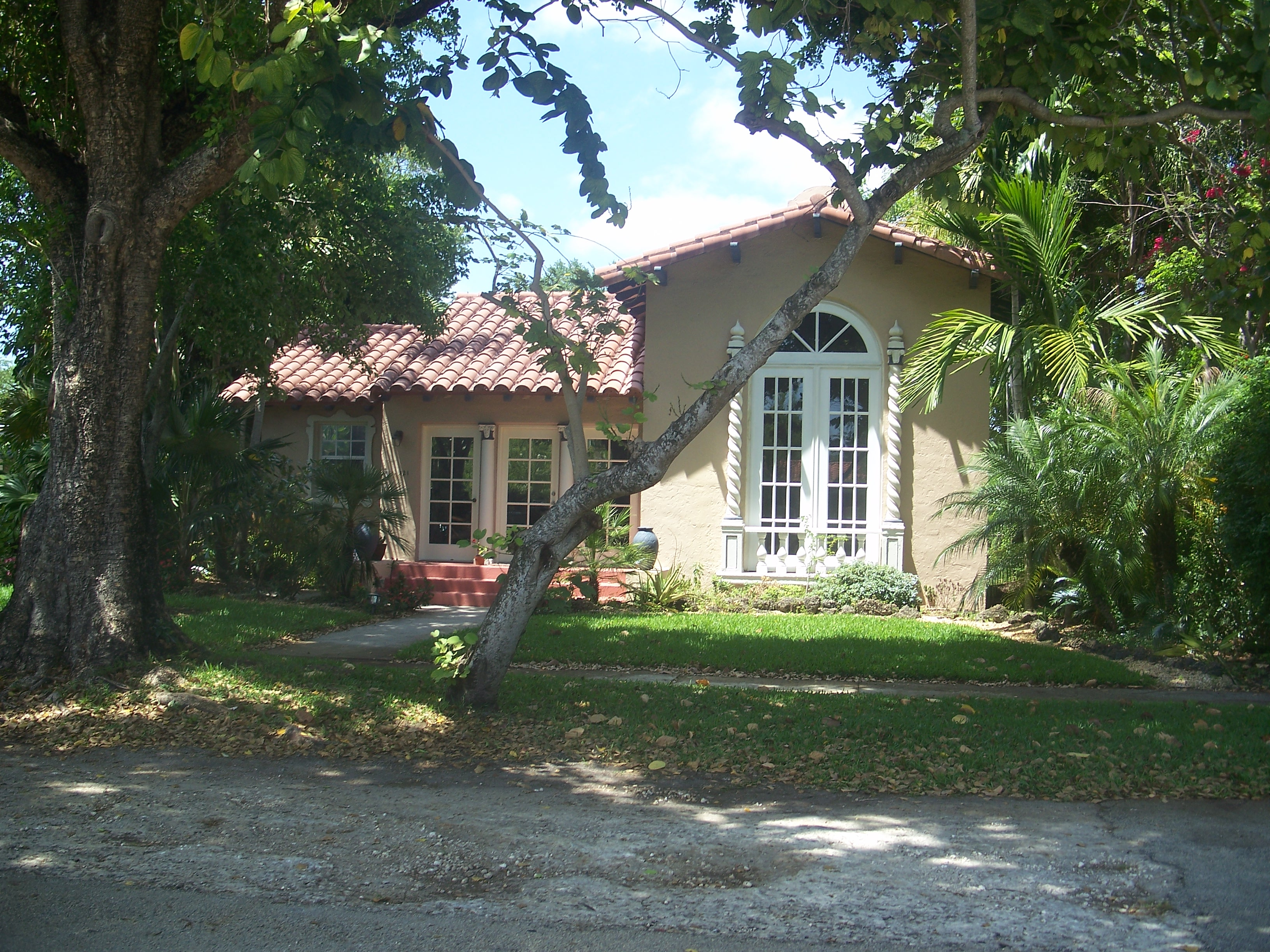
Building at 121 NE 100th Street

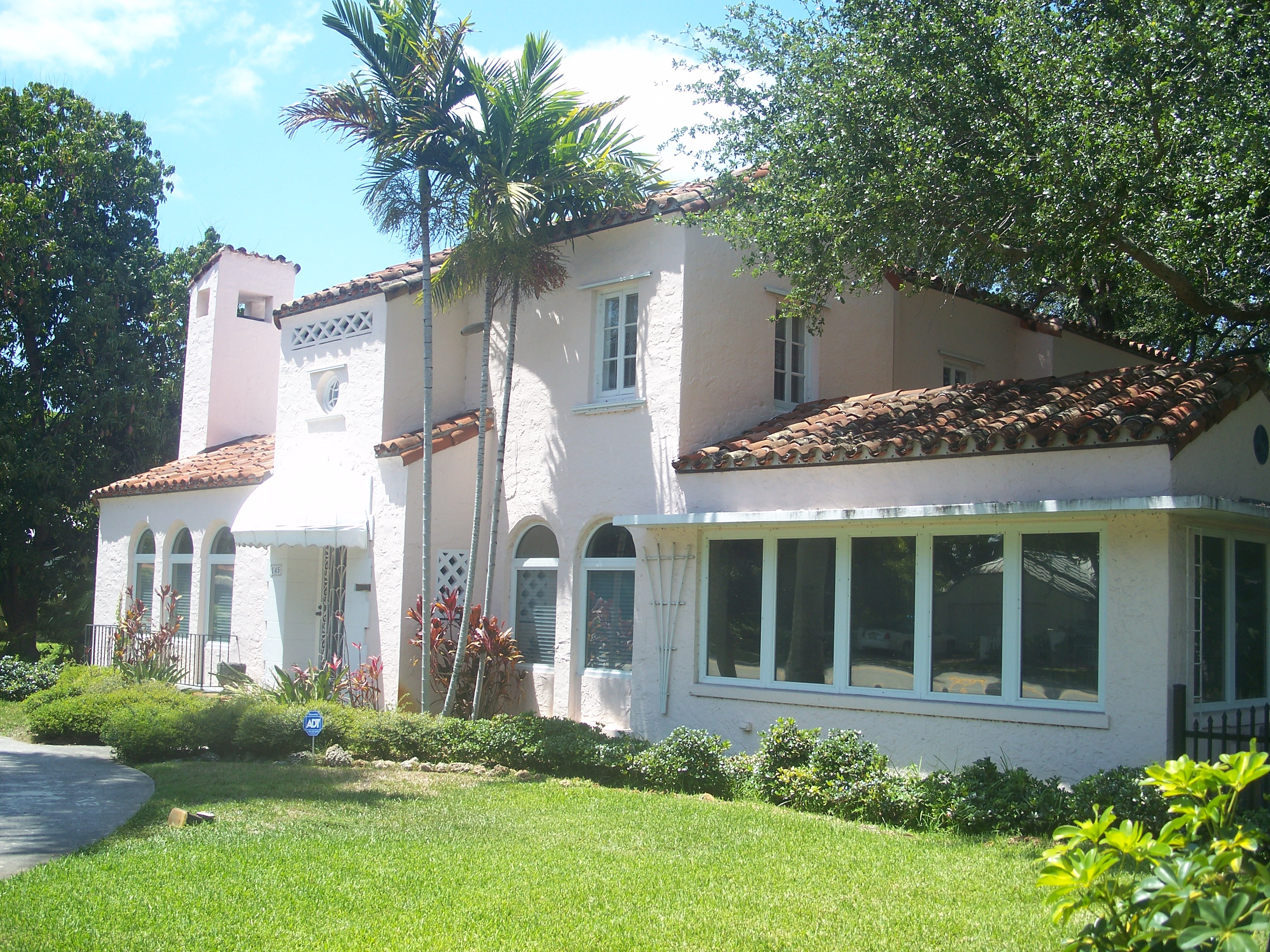
Building at 145 NE 95th Street

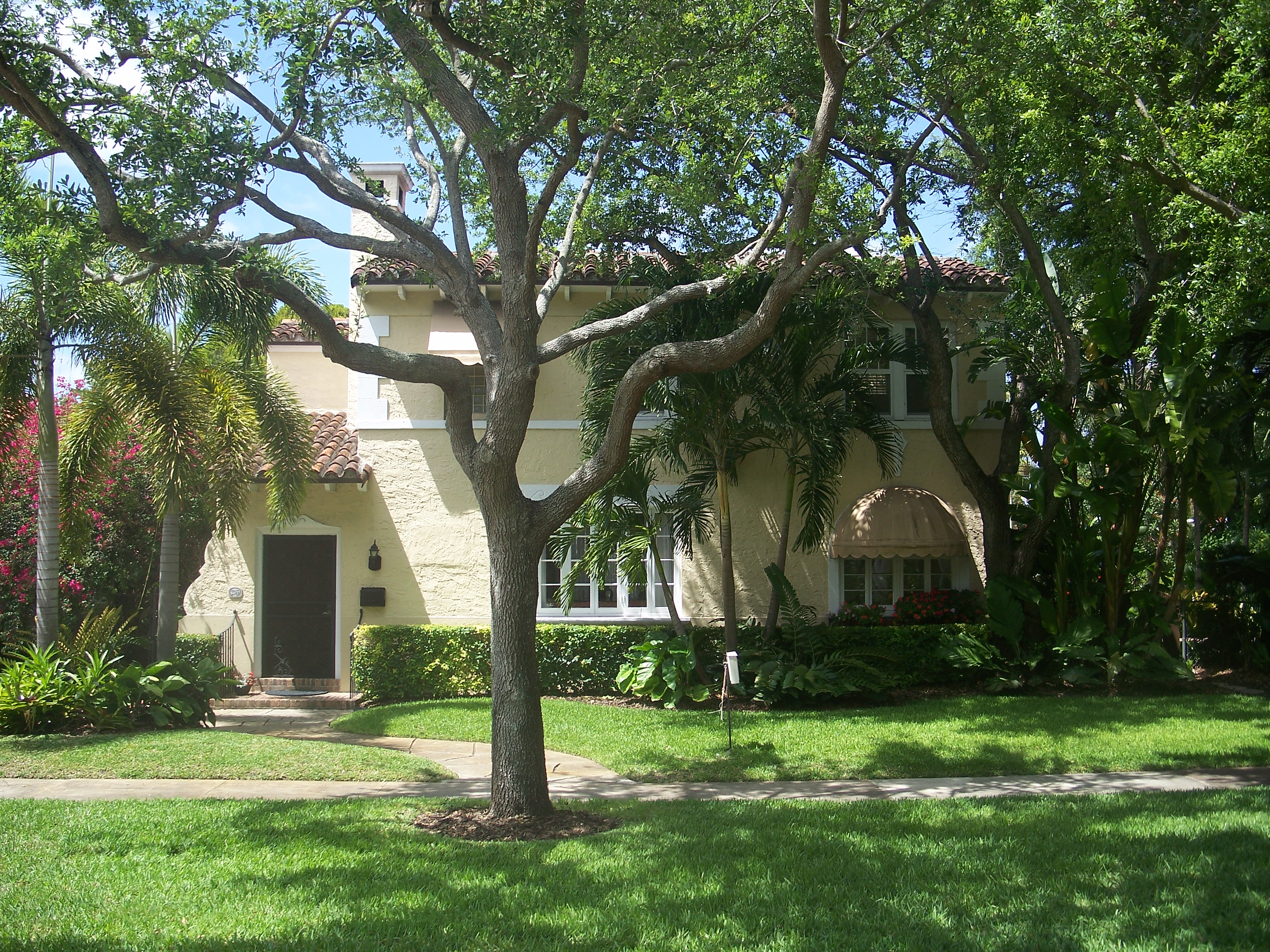
Building at 253 NE 99th Street

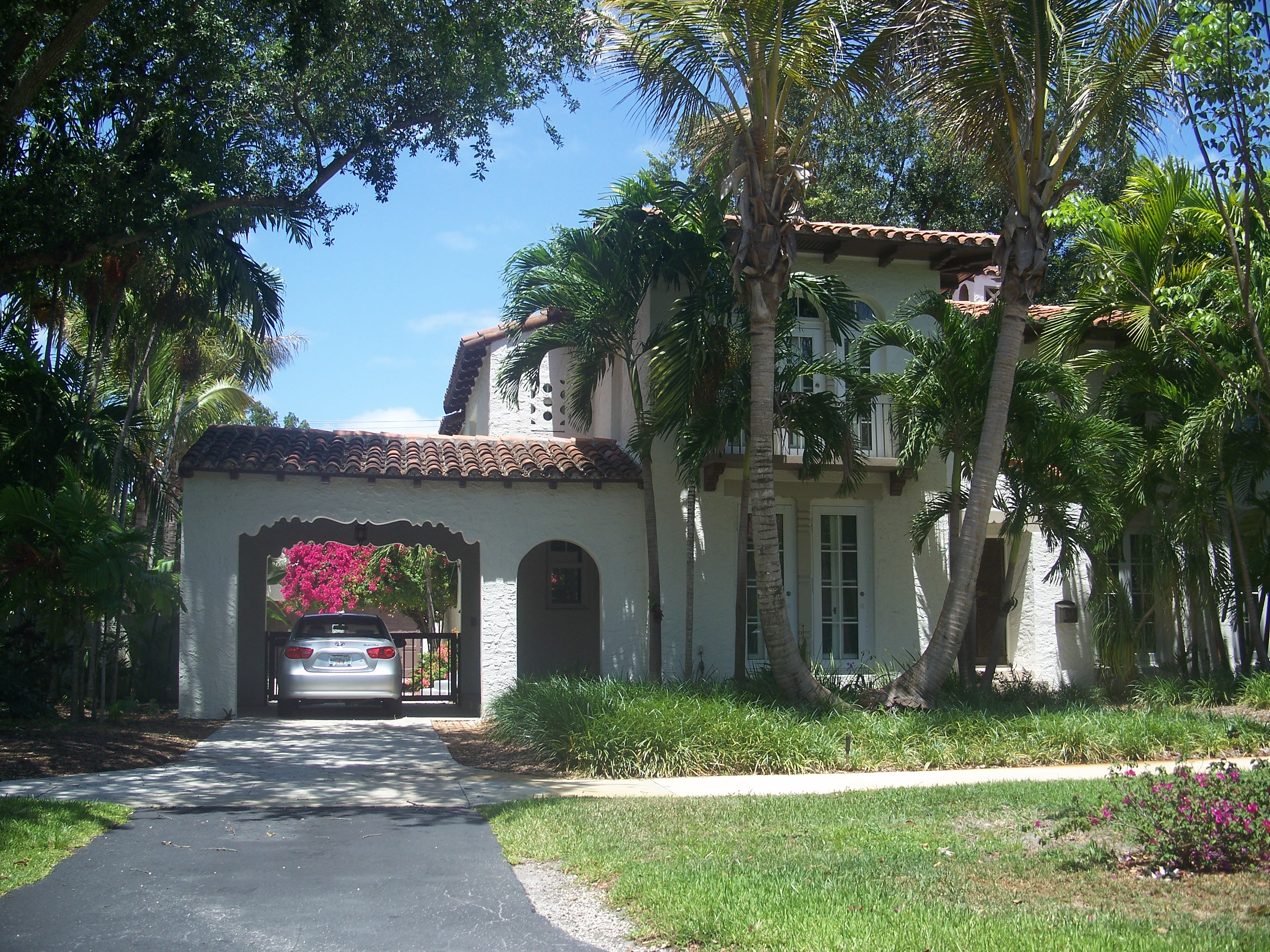
Building at 257 NE 91st Street

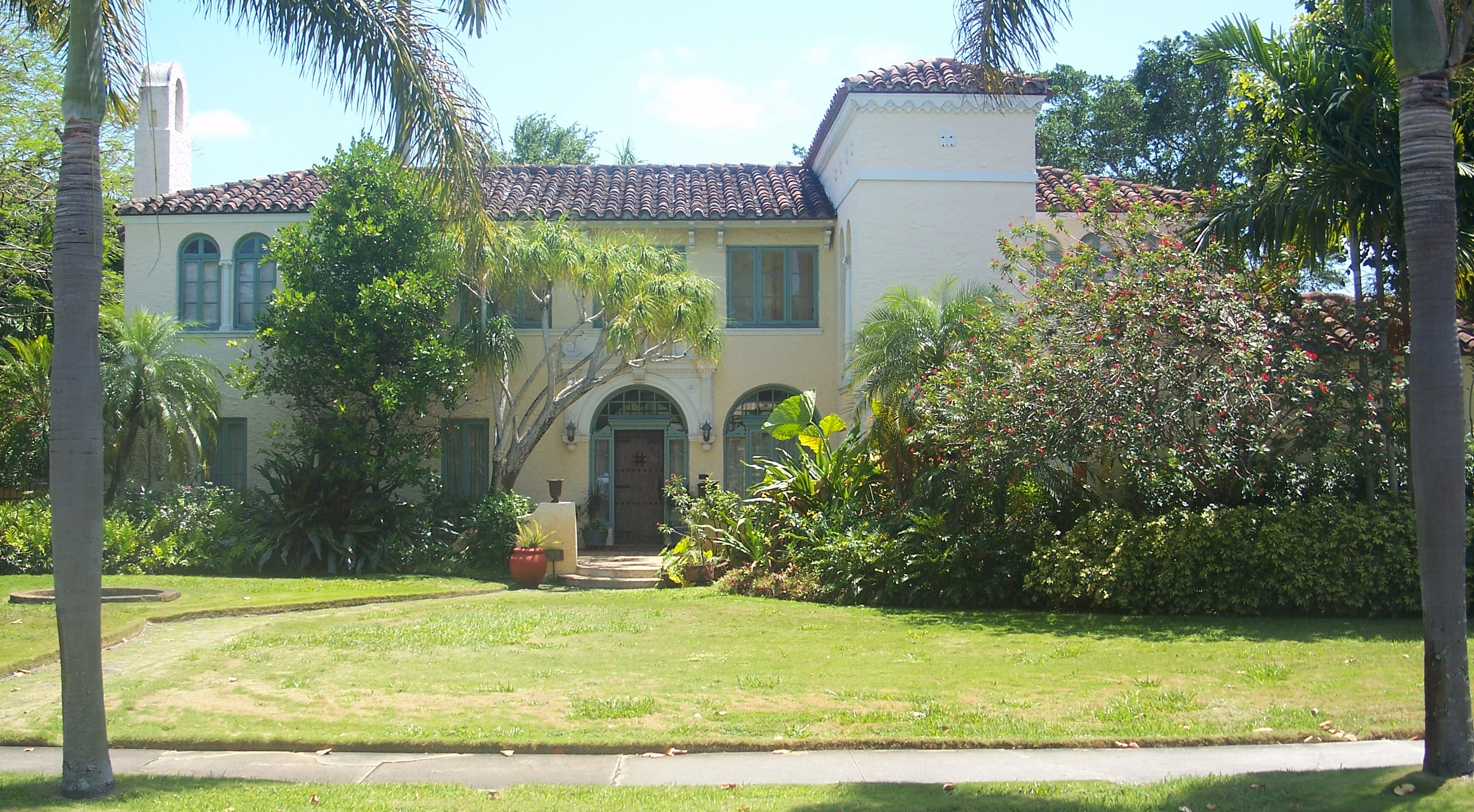
Building at 262 NE 96th Street

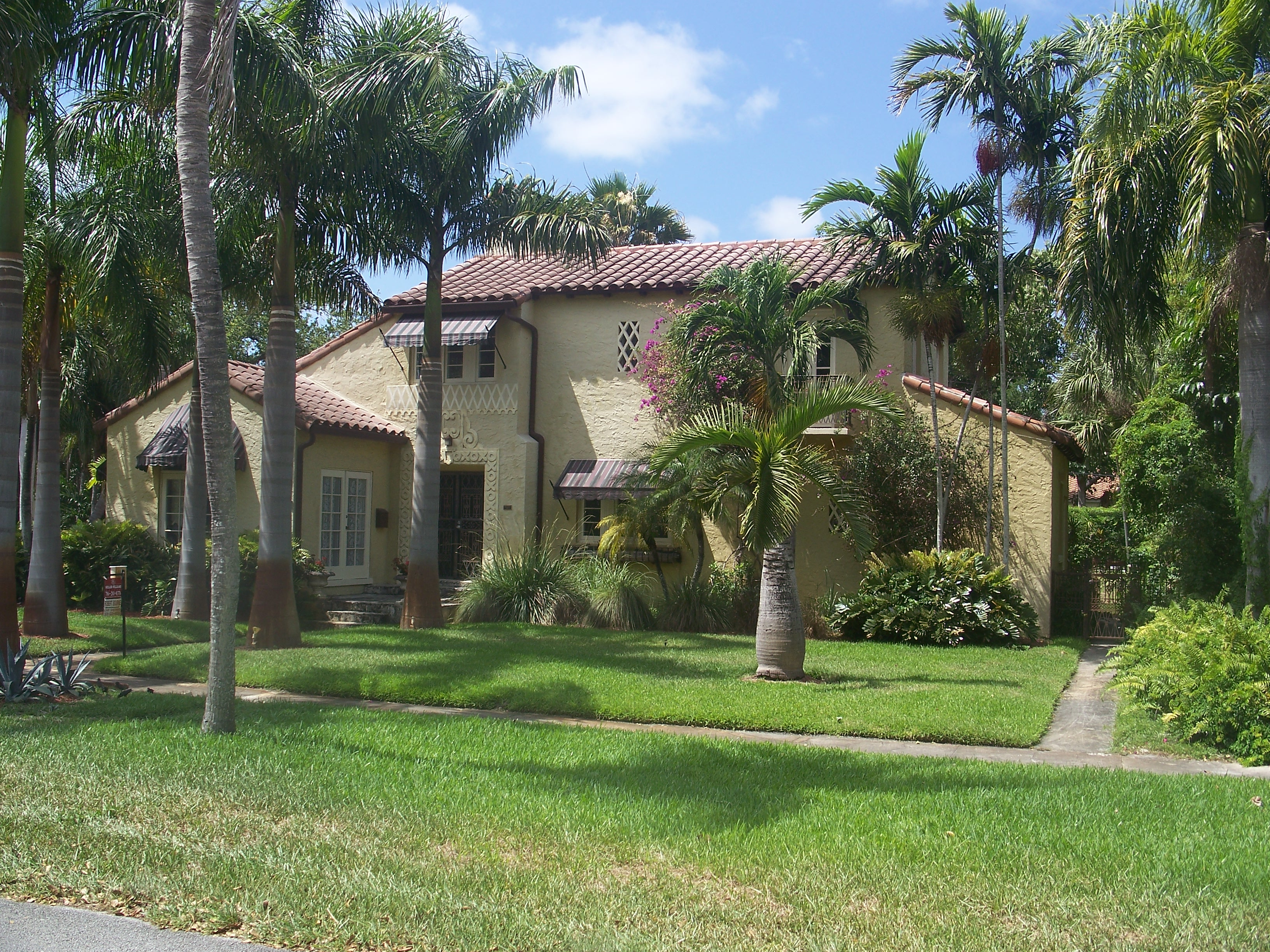
Building at 273 NE 98th Street

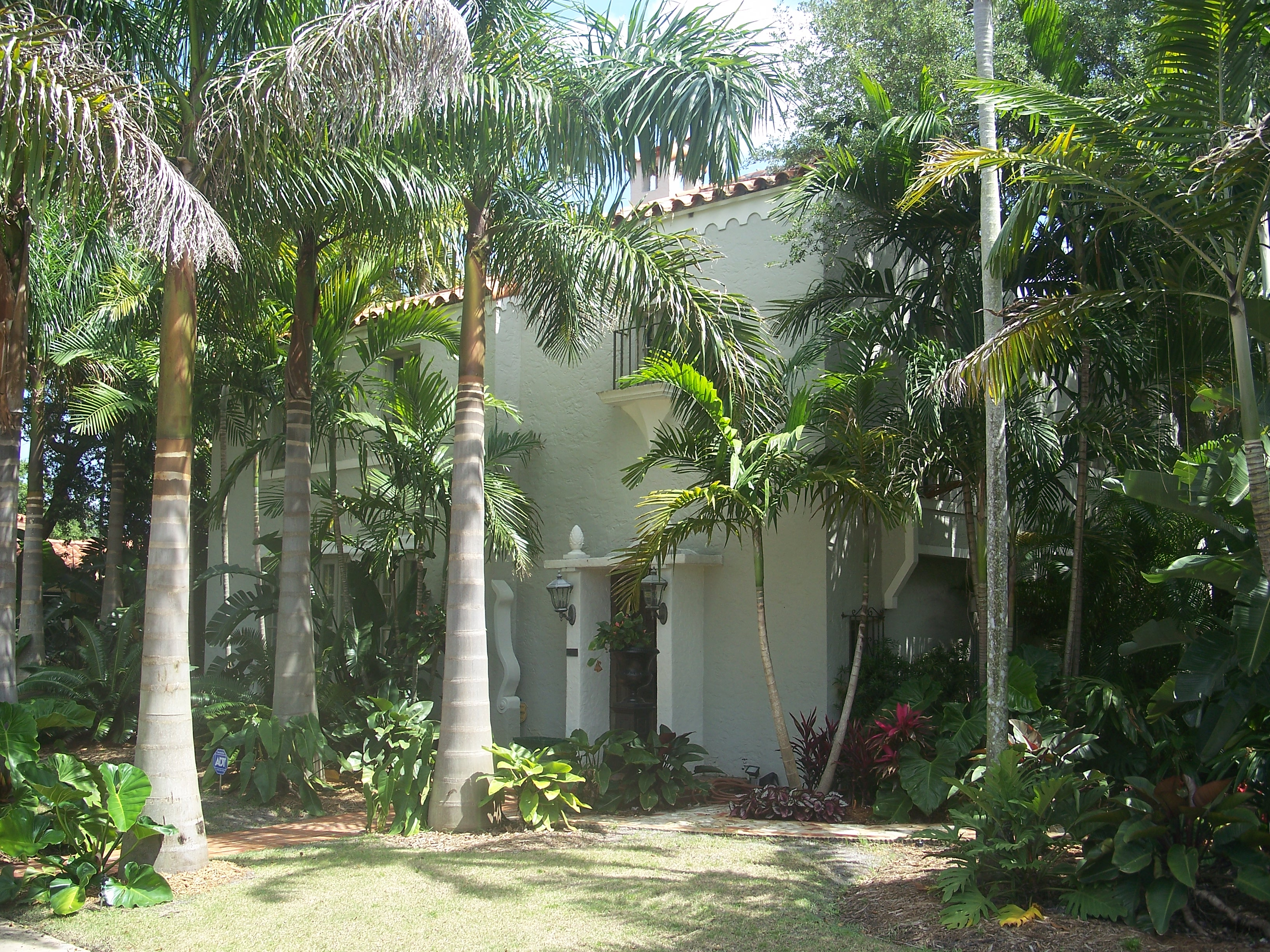
Building at 276 NE 98th Street

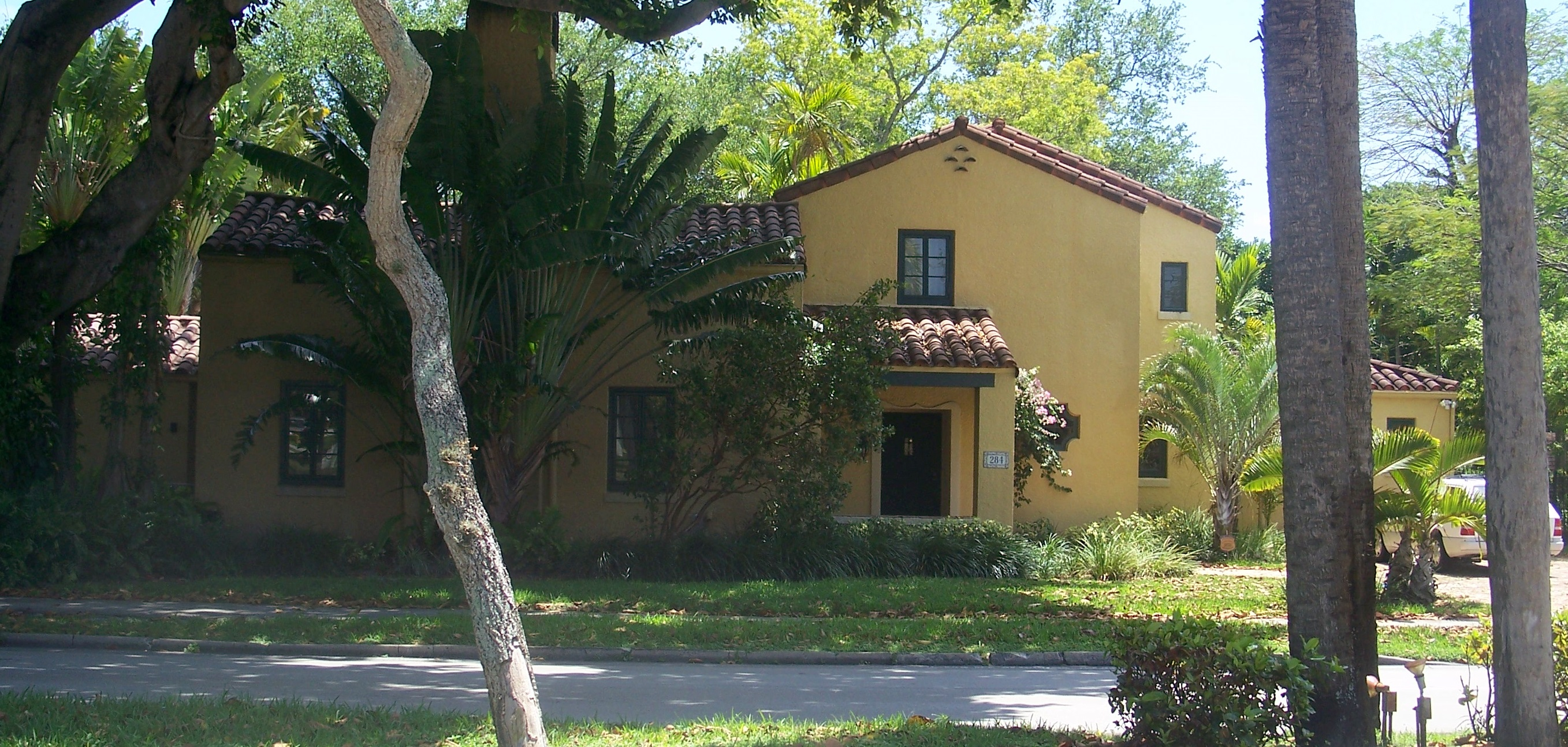
Building at 284 NE 96th Street

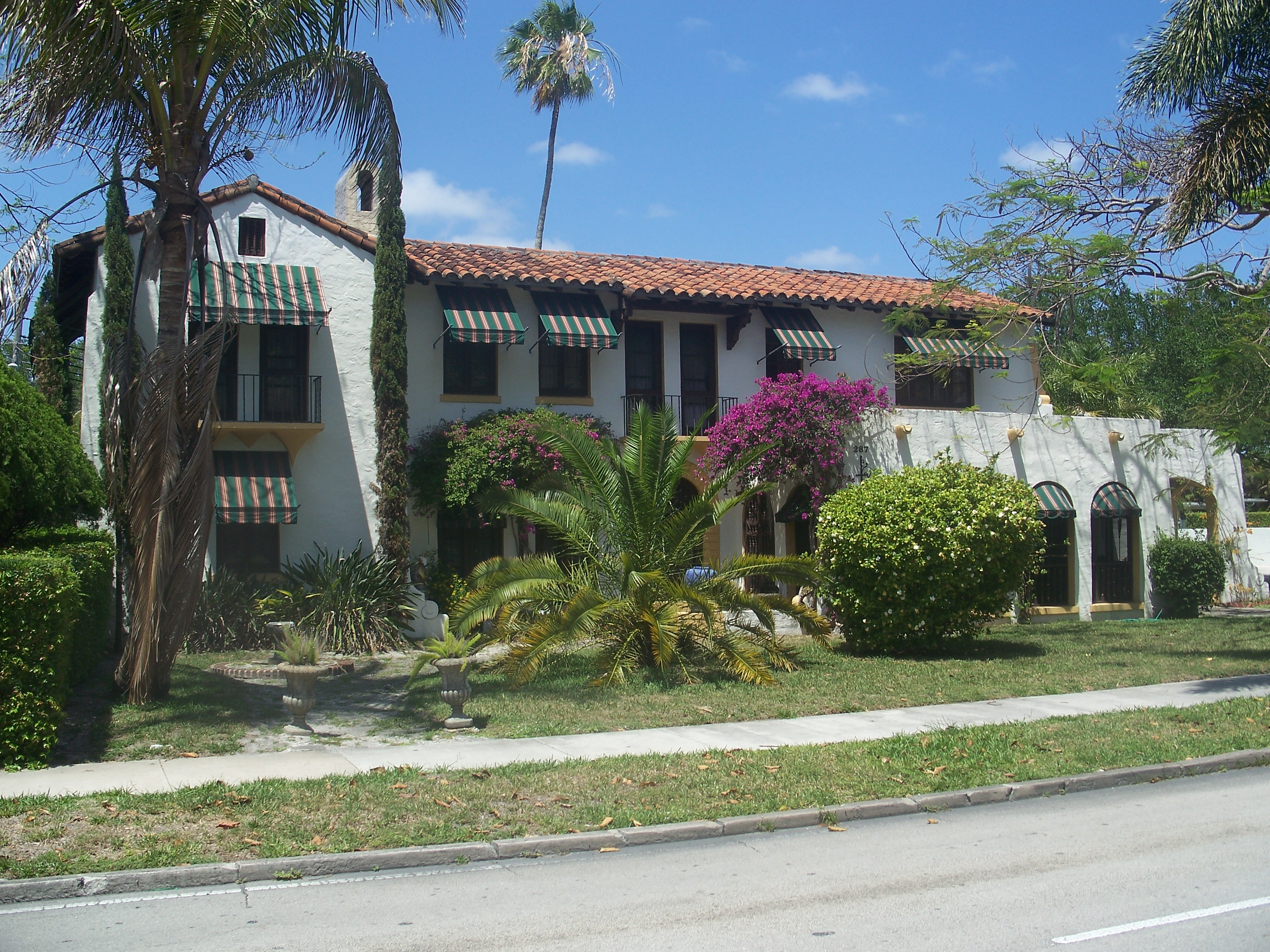
Building at 287 NE 96th Street

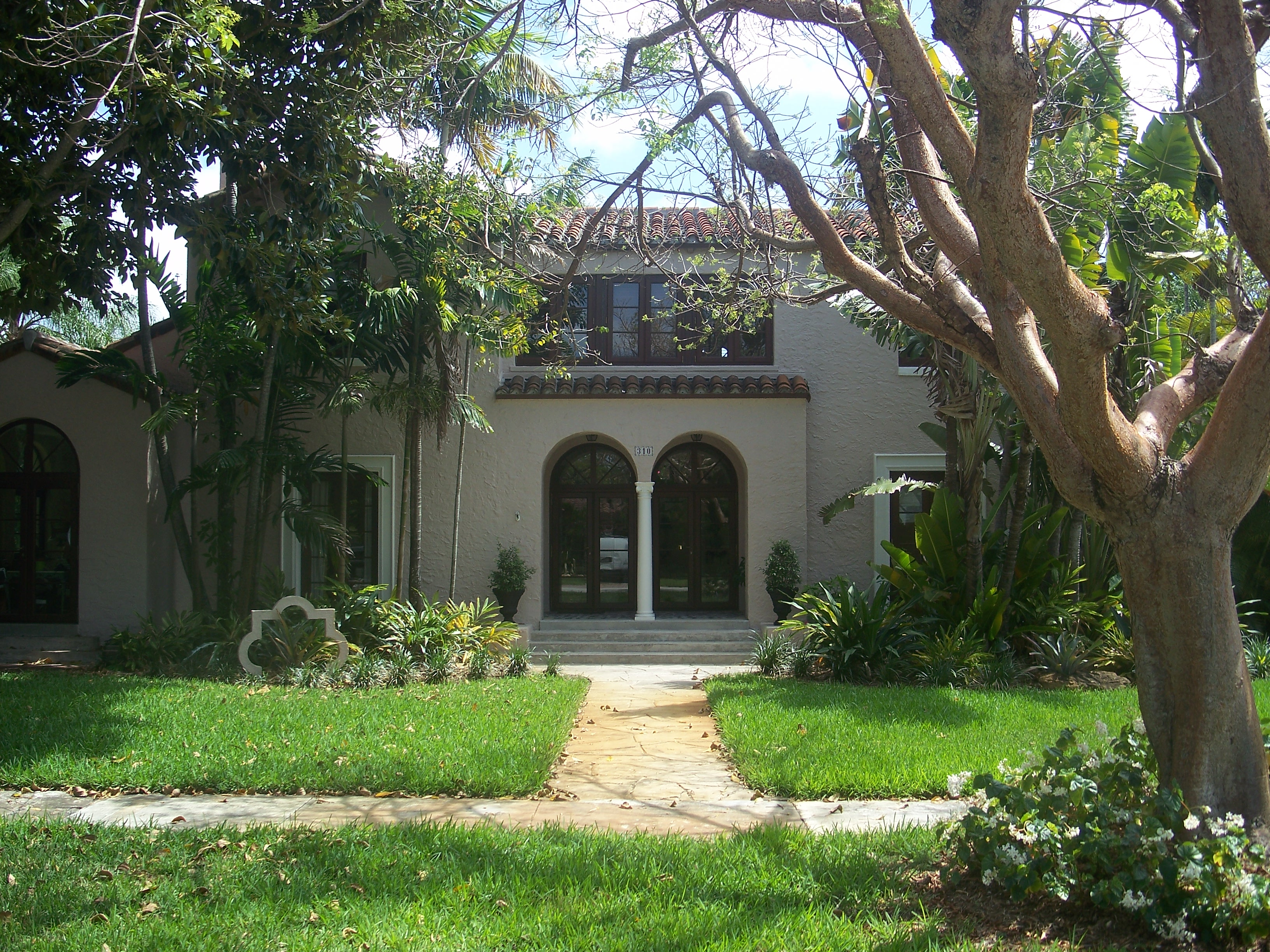
Building at 310 NE 99th Street

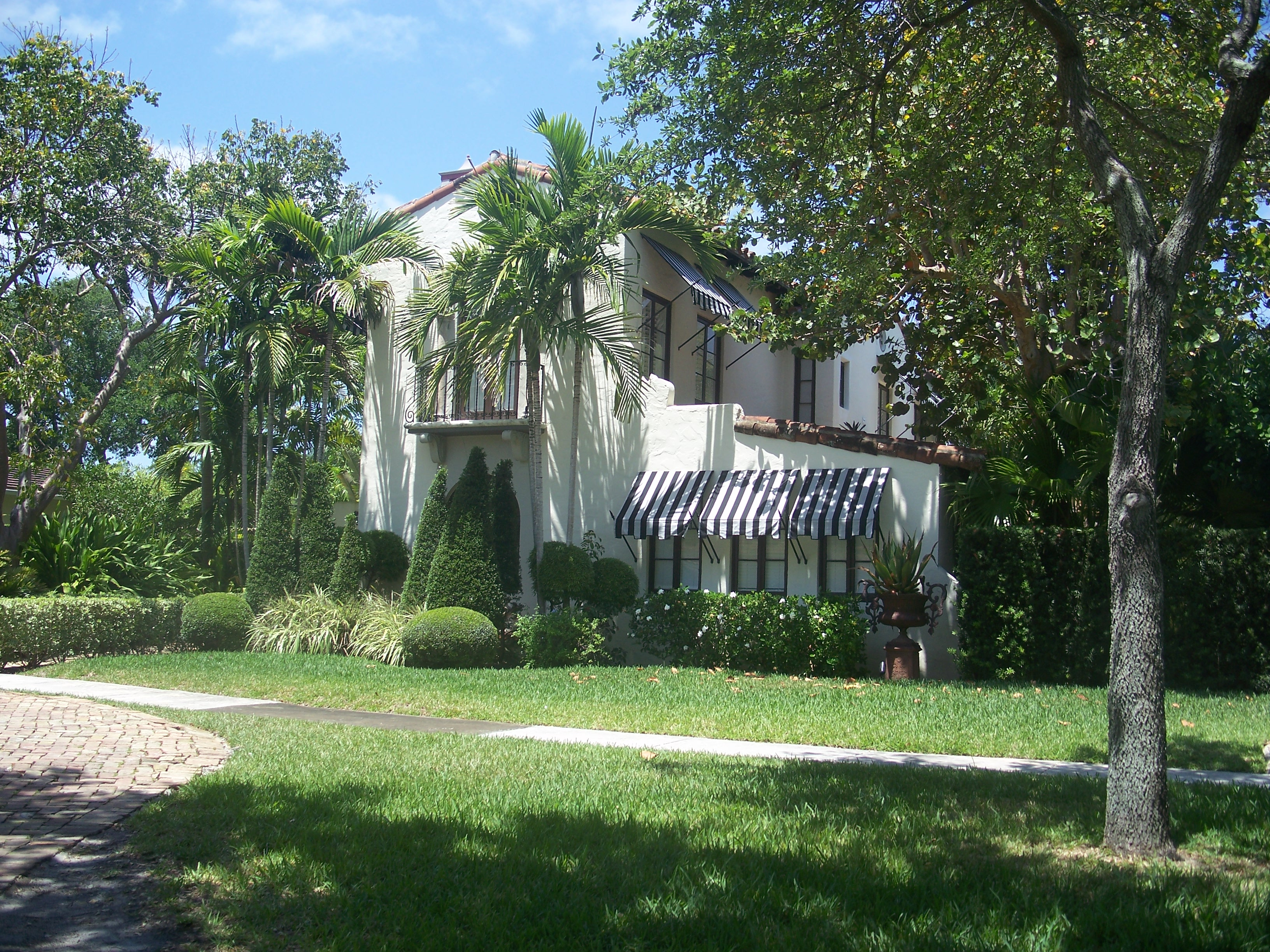
Building at 353 NE 91st Street

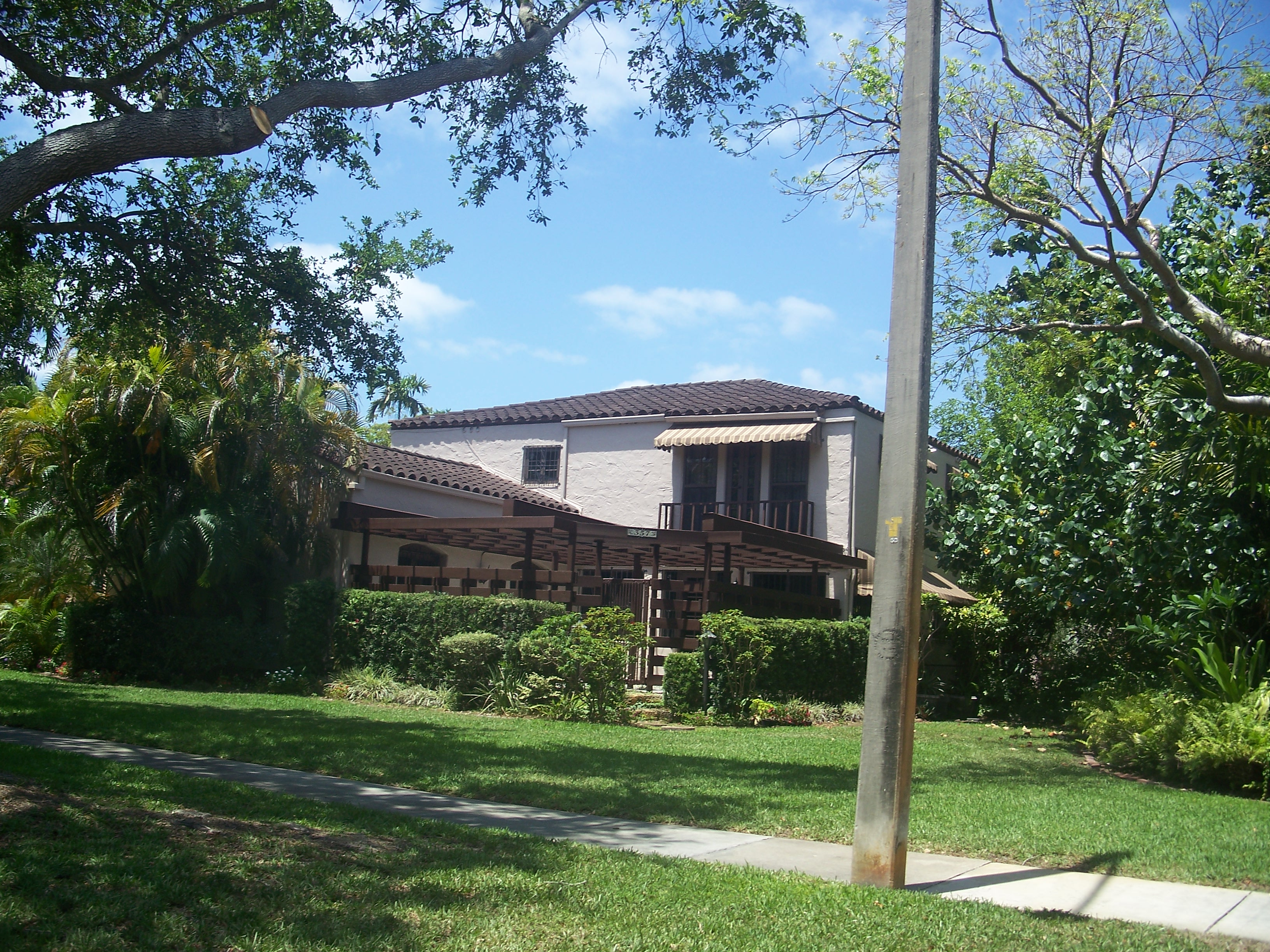
Building at 357 NE 92nd Street

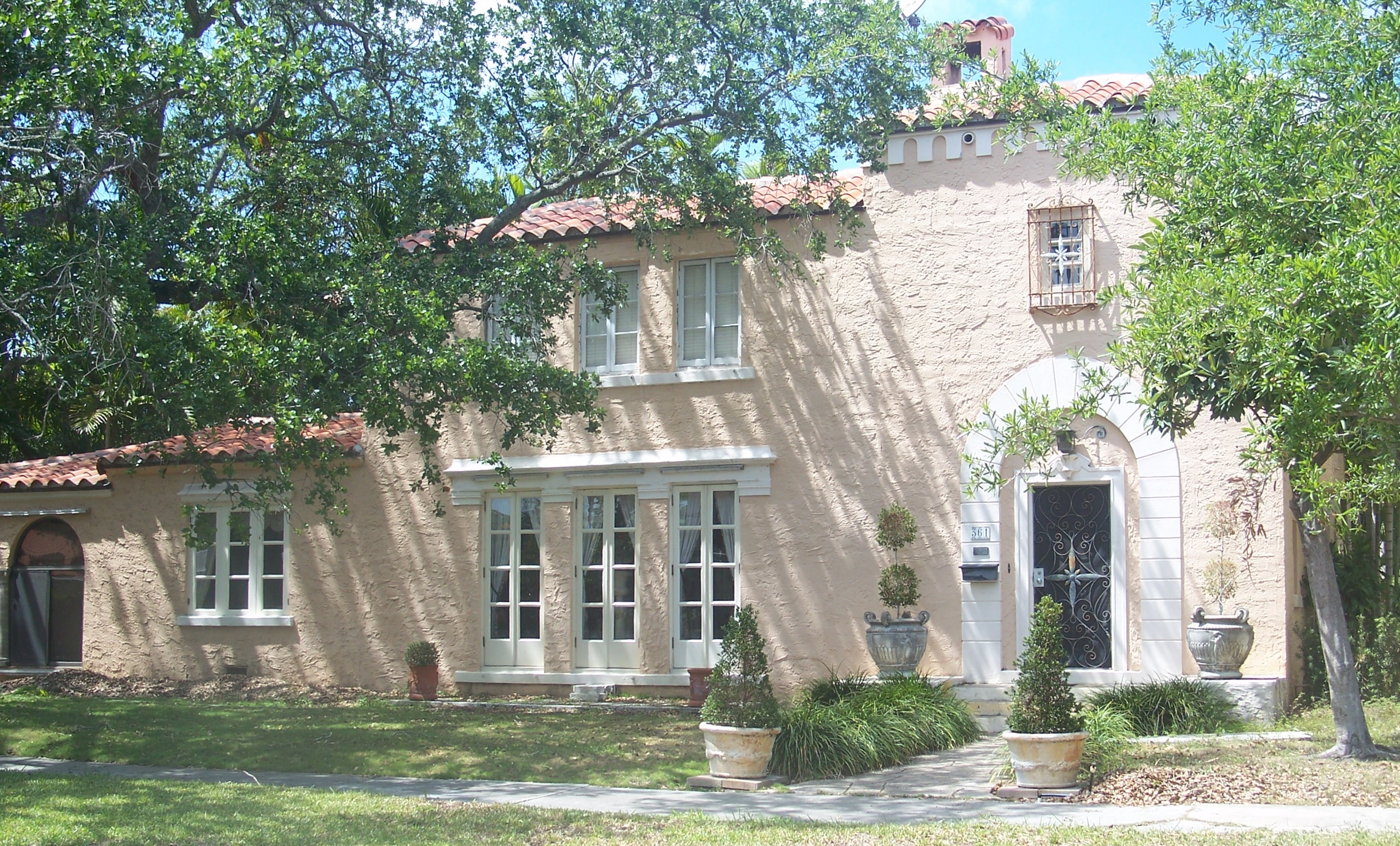
Building at 361 NE 97th Street

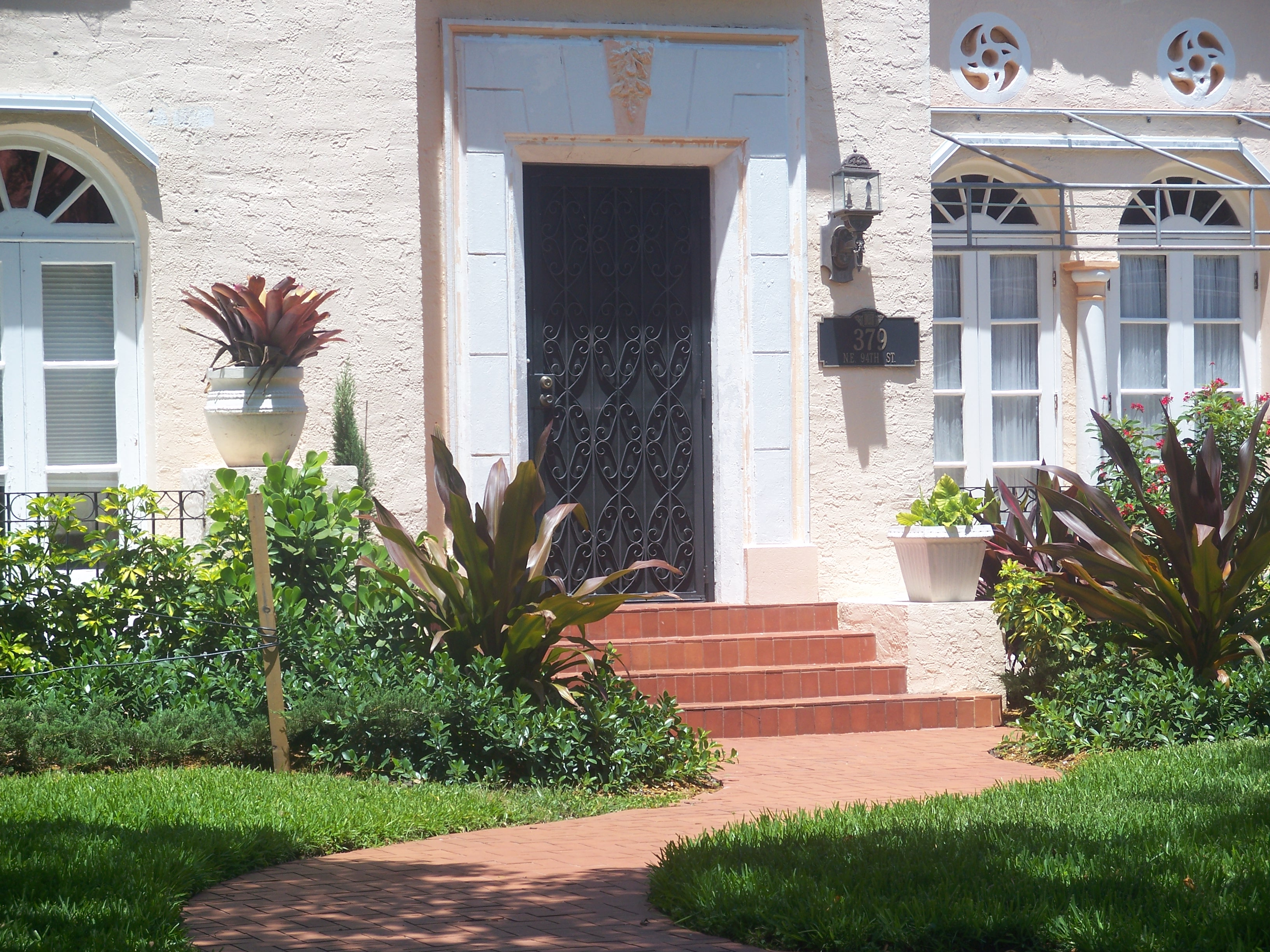
Building at 379 NE 94th Street

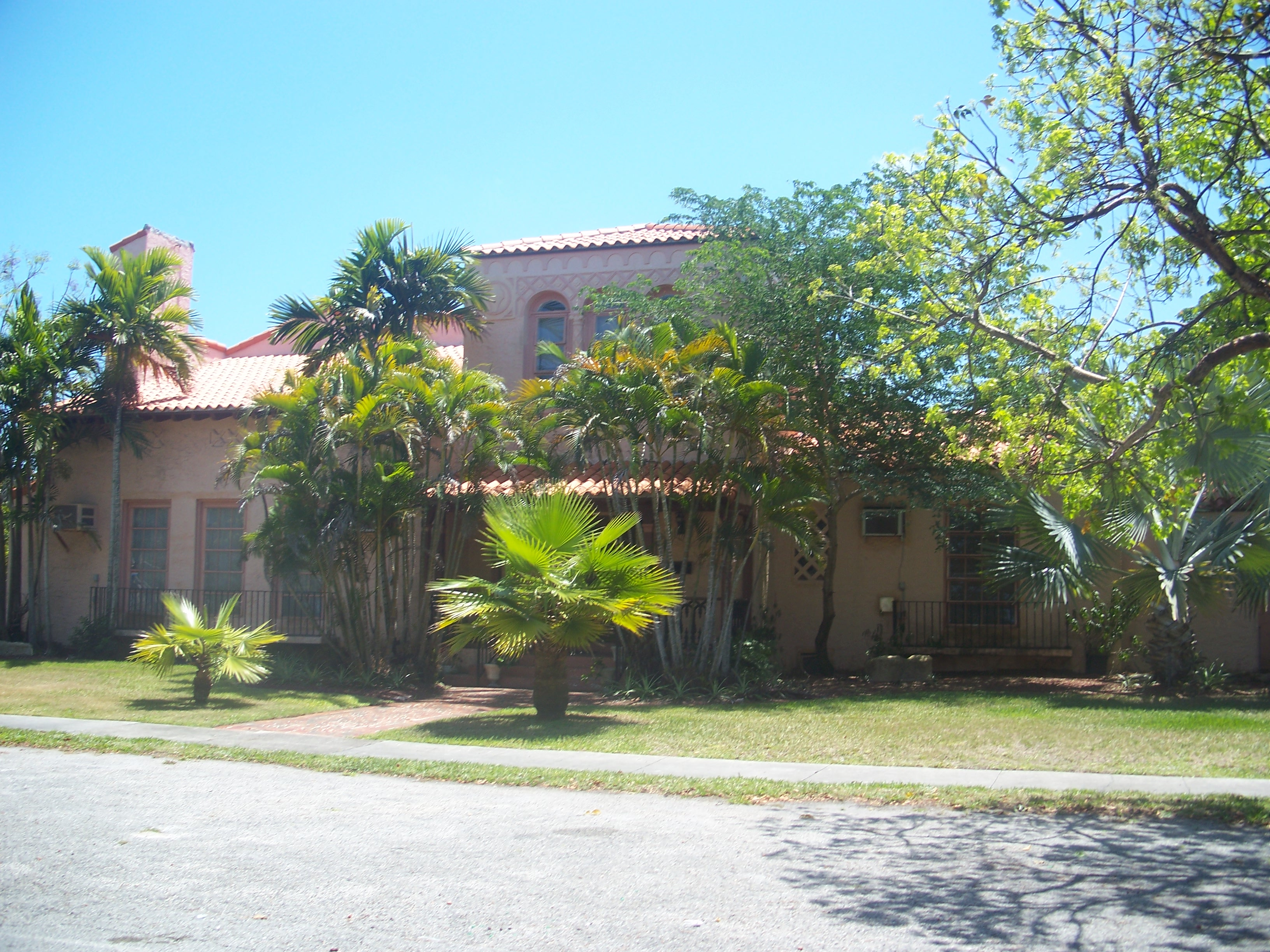
Building at 384 NE 94th Street

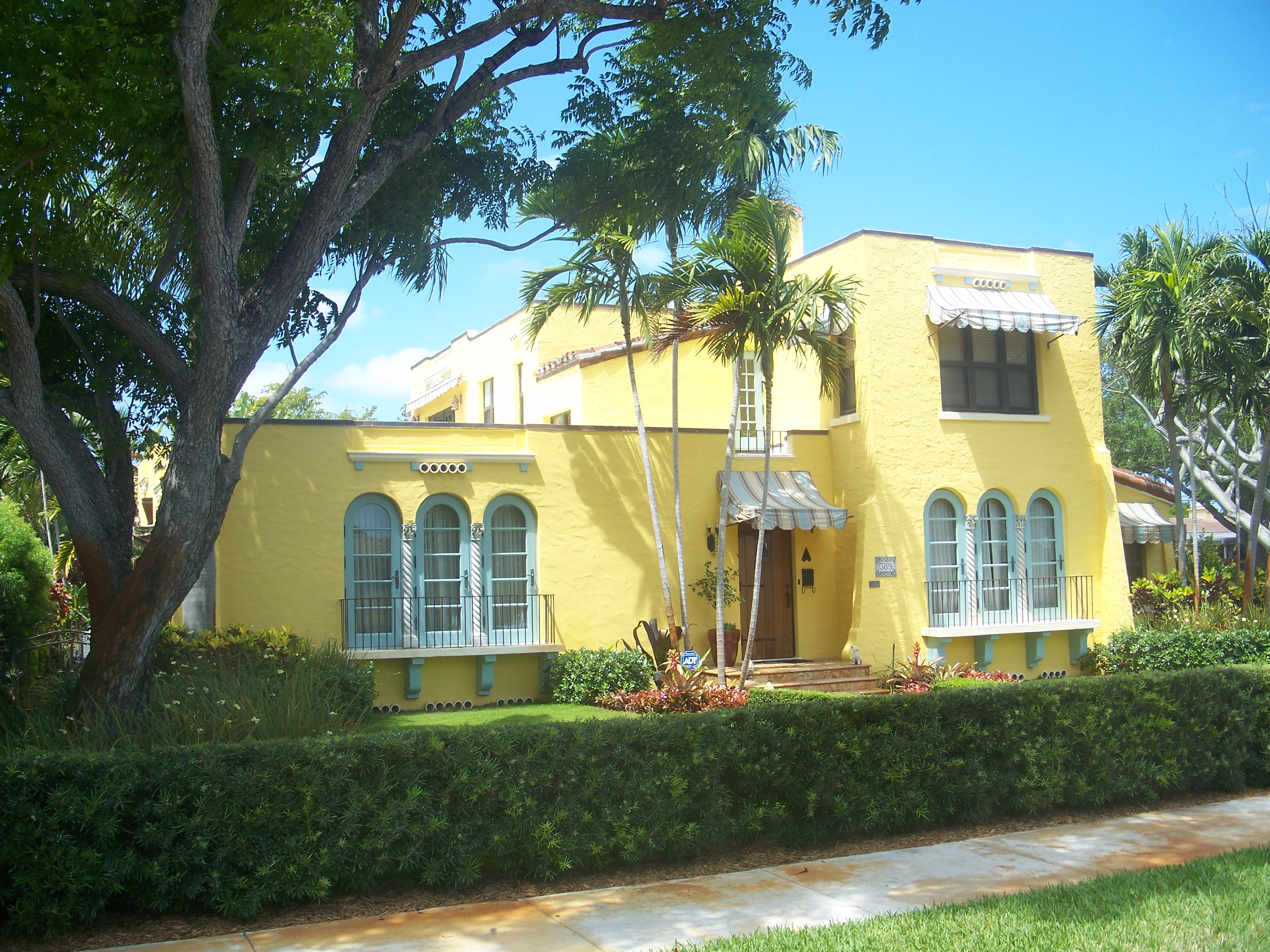
Building at 389 NE 99th Street

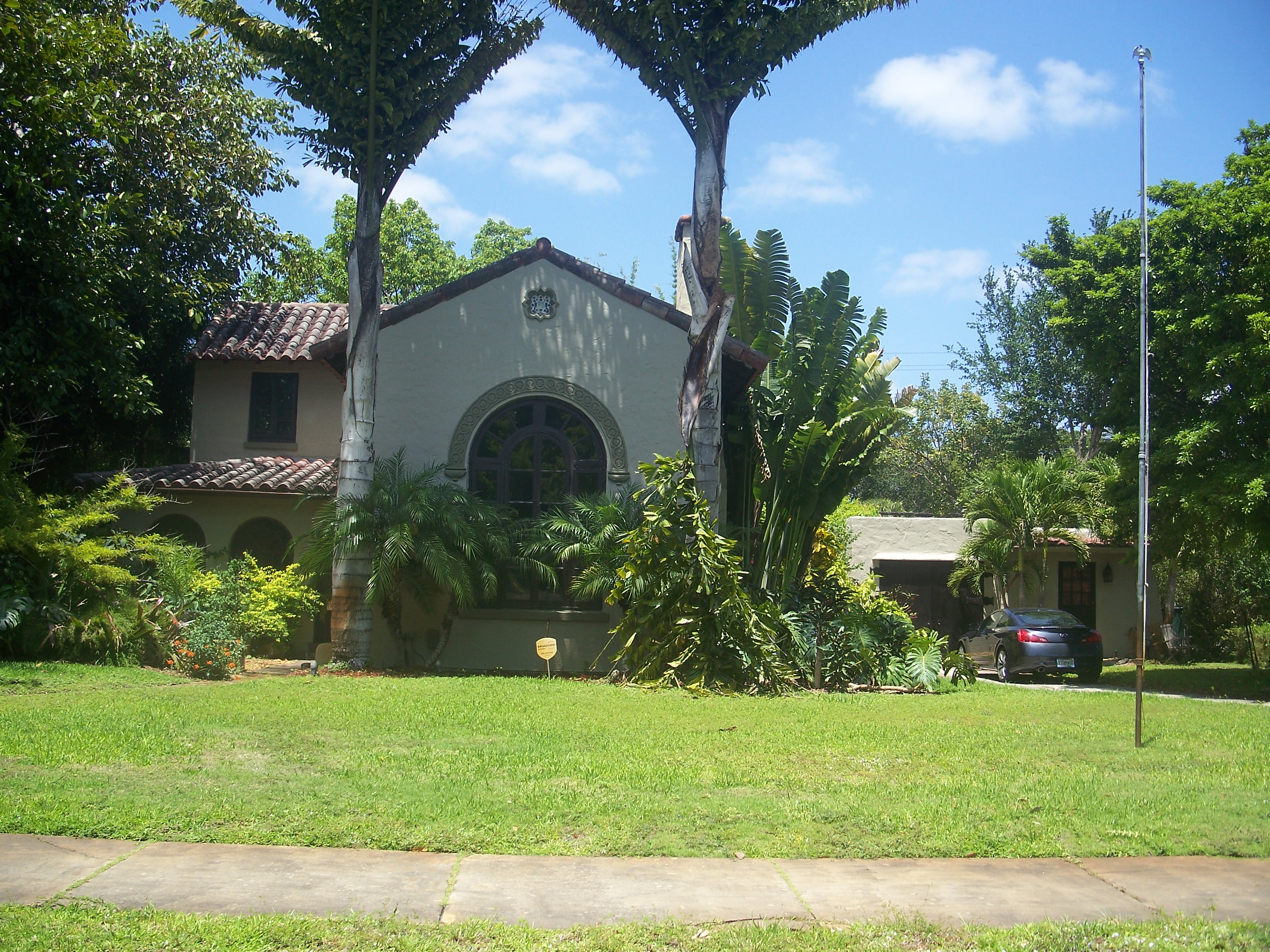
Building at 431 NE 94th Street

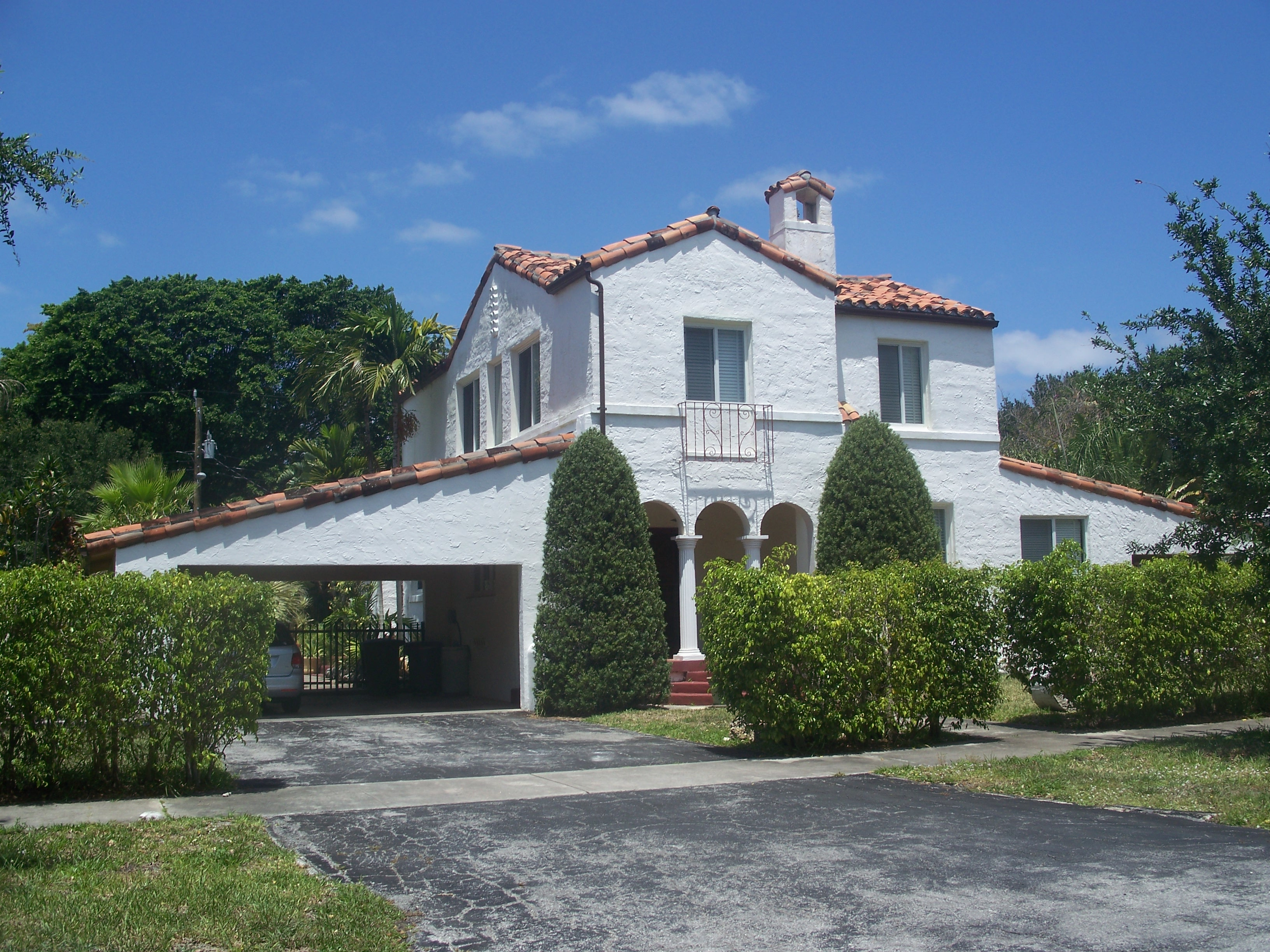
Building at 477 NE 92nd Street

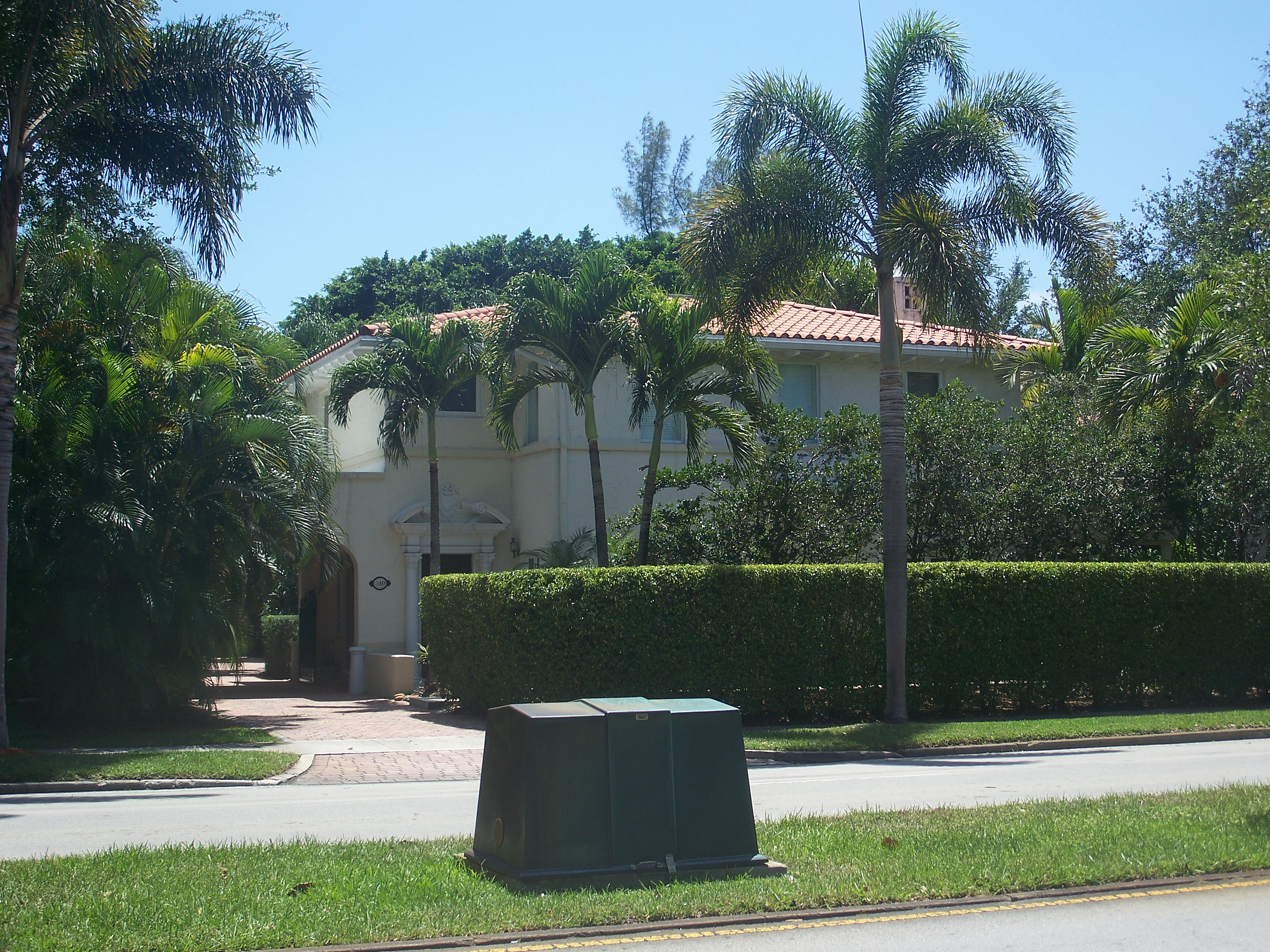
Building at 540 NE 96th Street

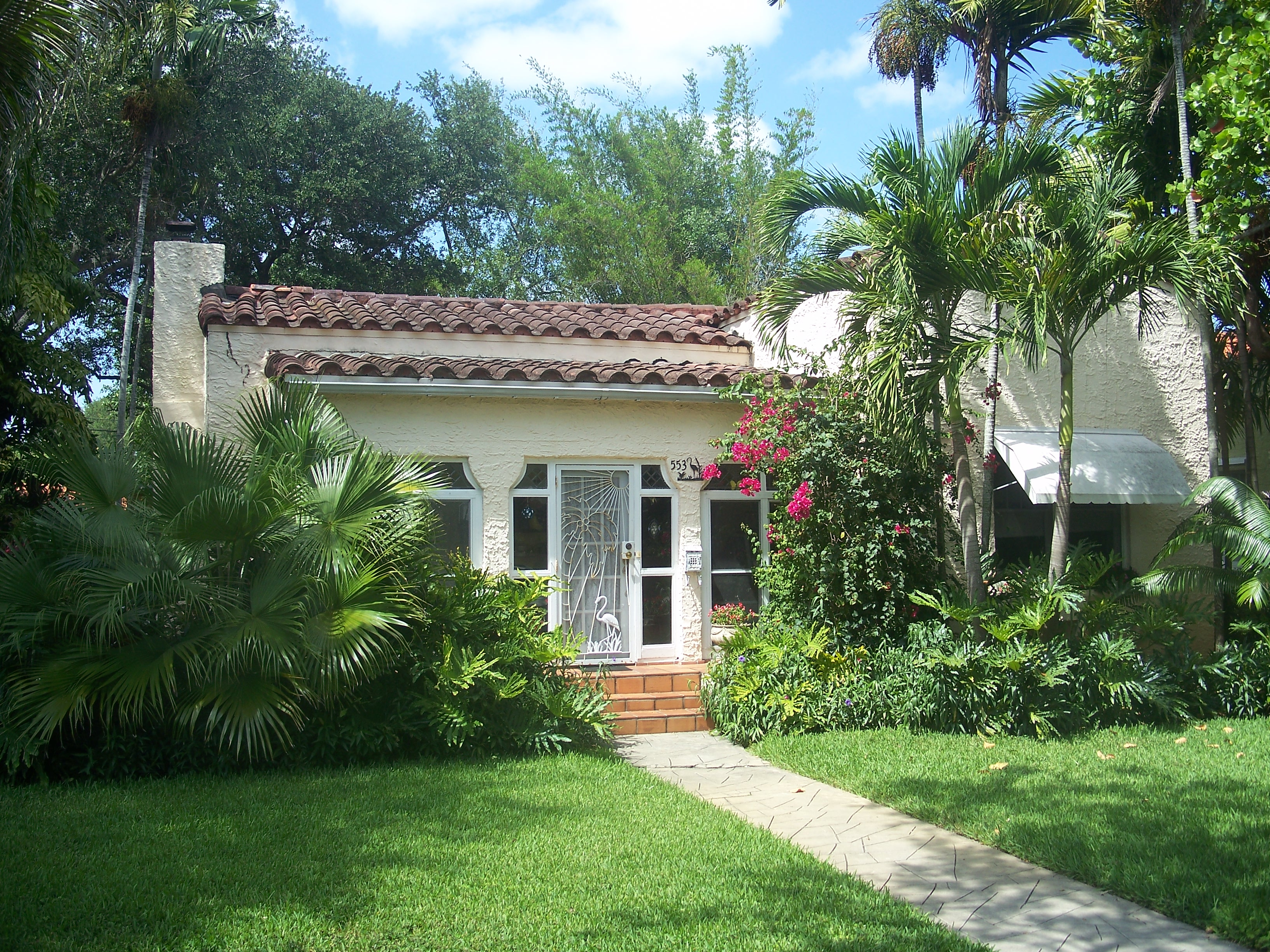
Building at 553 NE 101st Street

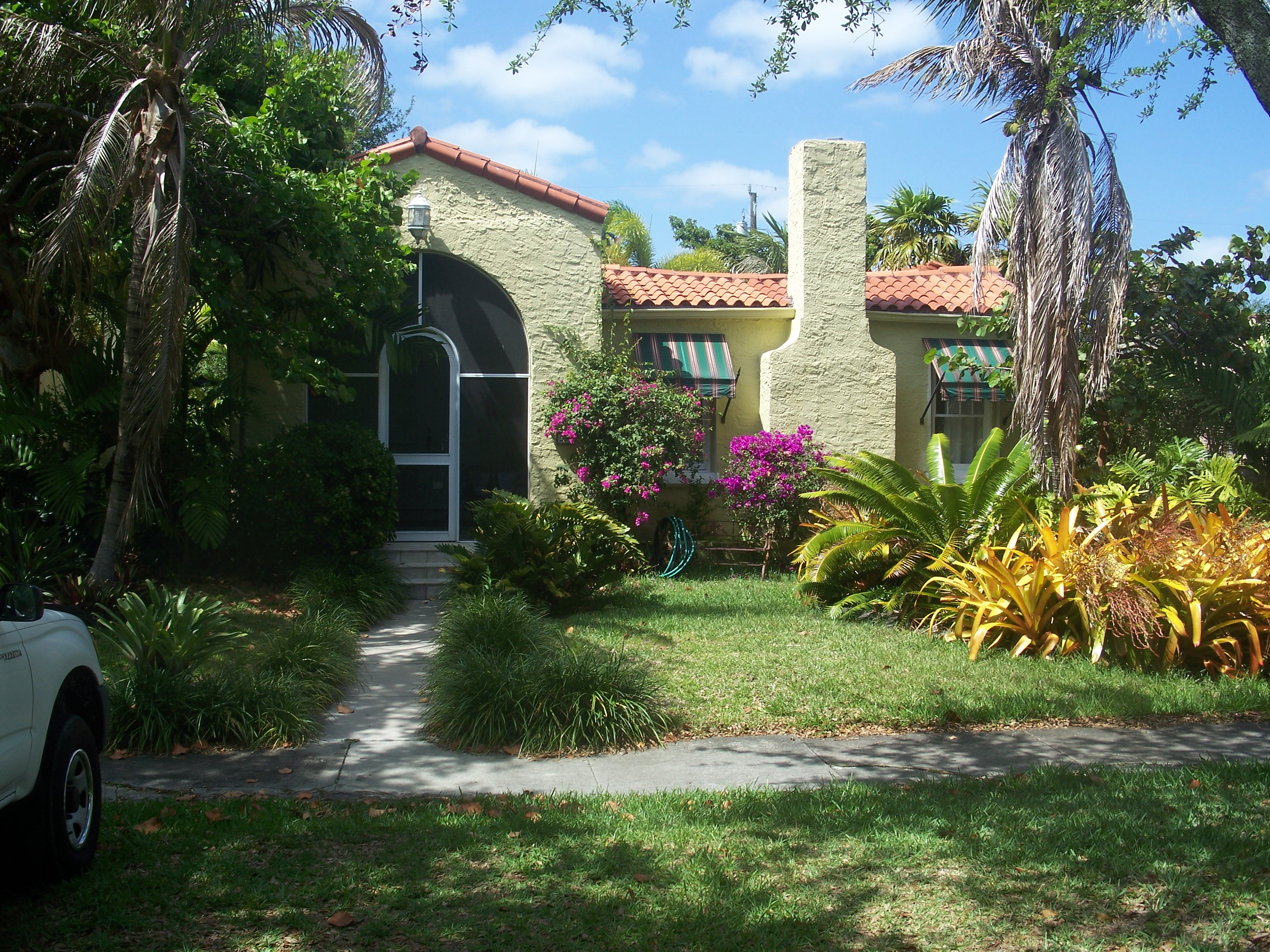
Building at 561 NE 101st Street

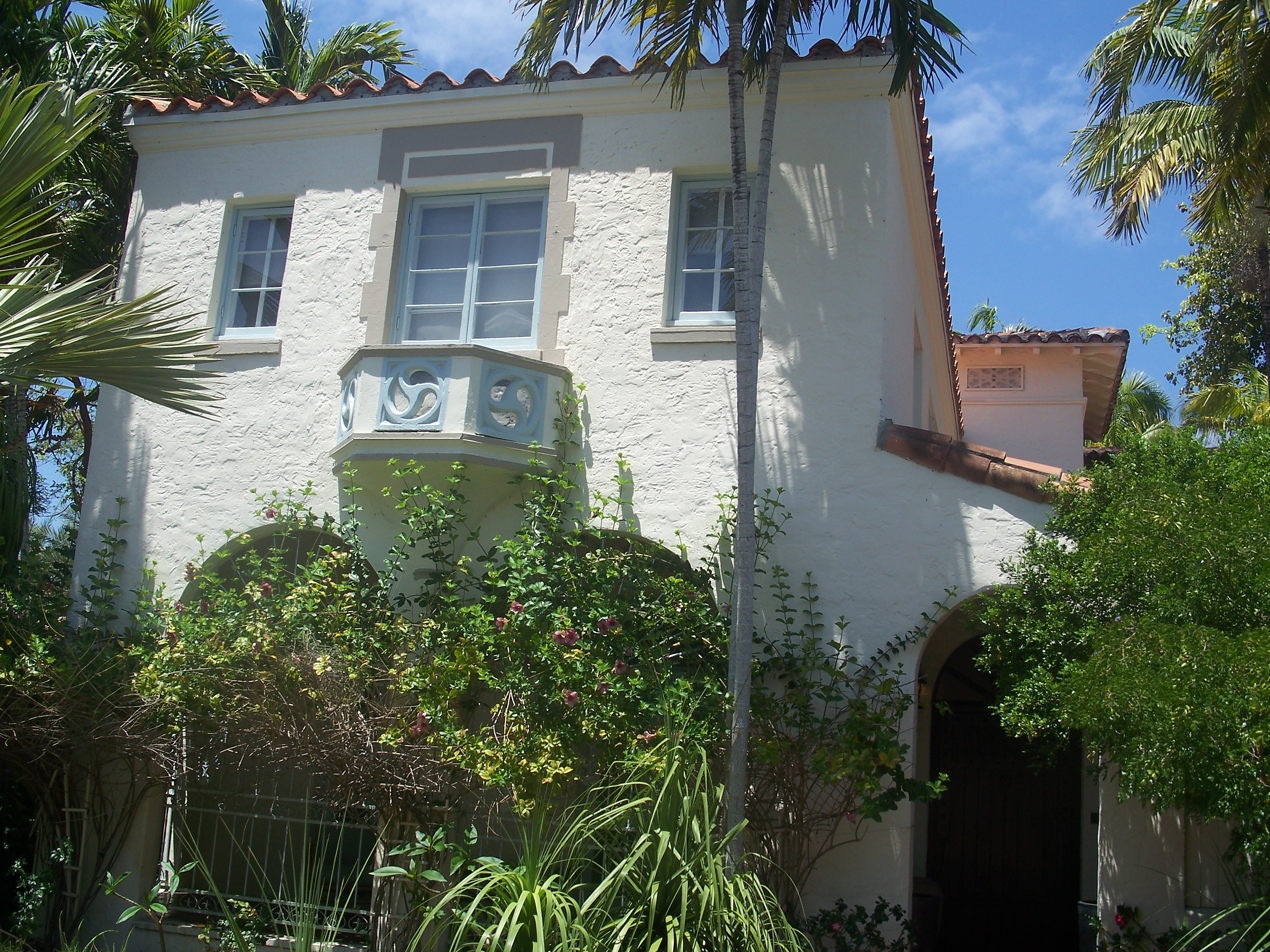
Building at 577 NE 96th Street

== See also ==
- National Register of Historic Places listings in Miami-Dade County, Florida
