= Seminole Cafe and Hotel =

- Landmark Hotel
- U.S. National Register of Historic Places
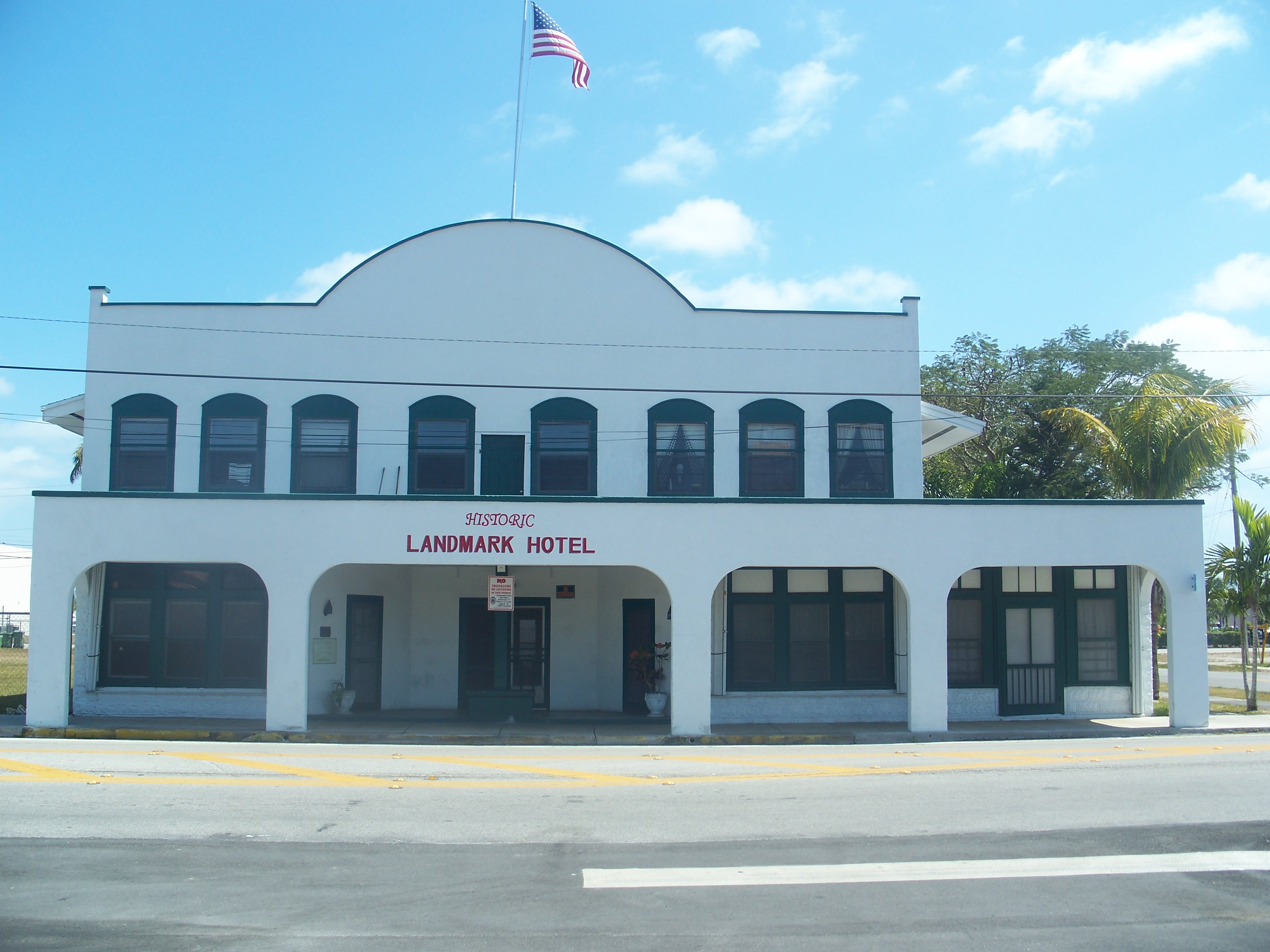

- Location within Florida Location within the United States
- Location: Homestead, Florida, USA
- Coordinates: 25°28′9.7″N 80°28′35″W
- NRHP reference No.: 08000641
- Added to NRHP: July 10, 2008

Seminole Cafe and Hotel is an historic building located at 55 South Flagler Avenue in Homestead, Florida, United States. A Mission Revival-style and wood-frame vernacular building with one- and two-story sections, the structure was originally built in Miami in the early 1910s and served as a theater. After the dismantling of the building in 1916, railcars were used to transport the building to Homestead. During the 1920s, the Seminole Cafe and Hotel opened, while the former was converted to an apartment unit in 1951. The latter was renamed the Landmark Hotel in 1965.

Hurricane Andrew in 1992 blew off most of the hotel's roof and part of the north wall. However, significant restoration work occurred due to a $75,000 grant approved by the Florida Legislature. On July 10, 2008, the Seminole Cafe and Hotel was added to the U.S. National Register of Historic Places.

== History and description ==
Although the National Register of Historic Places lists the Seminole Cafe and Hotel's year of construction as 1914, the Greater Miami Convention & Visitors Bureau states that it existed by 1912. At the time, it served as a storefront for Big Fish of Miami, a whale shark attraction. In 1913, the storefront was converted to Airdome theater in 1913, which showed silent films in an open-air setting. Eventually, it was renamed the Colonial Theater. The theater was disassembled in 1916 and transported to Homestead, "like most early pioneers," according to the Greater Miami Convention & Visitors Bureau. This occurred via rail cars after owner Joseph C. Boss purchased a corner along Homestead's Flagler Avenue for $900 from Sara J. and T.E. Savage.

On January 24, 1917, a dedication ceremony was held at the theater's (then known as the Garden Theater) current location at 55 South Flagler Avenue in Homestead. The structure, which is a Mission Revival-style and wood-frame vernacular building, features one- and two-story sections. During the 1920s, the theater closed a few times and sold to a few different owners. The Seminole Cafe opened in 1921, while the Seminole Hotel opened in 1926, which initially featured 26 guest rooms. Owner Gussie Joiner completely renovated the structure in 1936. Following Joiner's death in 1951, his niece Mary Suber, also Homestead's librarian, acquired the building. After Suber hired Lester J. Myer to manage the hotel, the cafe was closed and replaced with an apartment for him.

Since the 1960s, the hotel has been owned by several individuals. It was renamed the Landmark Hotel in 1965. During the 1980s and 1990s, fire and safety code violations were discovered. Hurricane Andrew in 1992 tore off most of the hotel's roof and a part of the north wall, while the Miami Herald reported that the "structure would require complete rebuilding." The 1993 session of the Florida Legislature approved nearly $800,000 in state grants to restore 11 historic sites in southern Miami-Dade County after Andrew, with the Landmark Hotel receiving $75,000. Much of the damage from the hurricane was subsequently repaired. On July 10, 2008, the Seminole Cafe and Hotel was added to the U.S. National Register of Historic Places. By that year, the building became the Homestead-Florida City Chamber of Commerce, although the organization has since moved to the historic Homestead Town Hall.

== See also ==
- National Register of Historic Places listings in Miami-Dade County, Florida
