= Florida Pioneer Museum =

- U.S. National Register of Historic Places
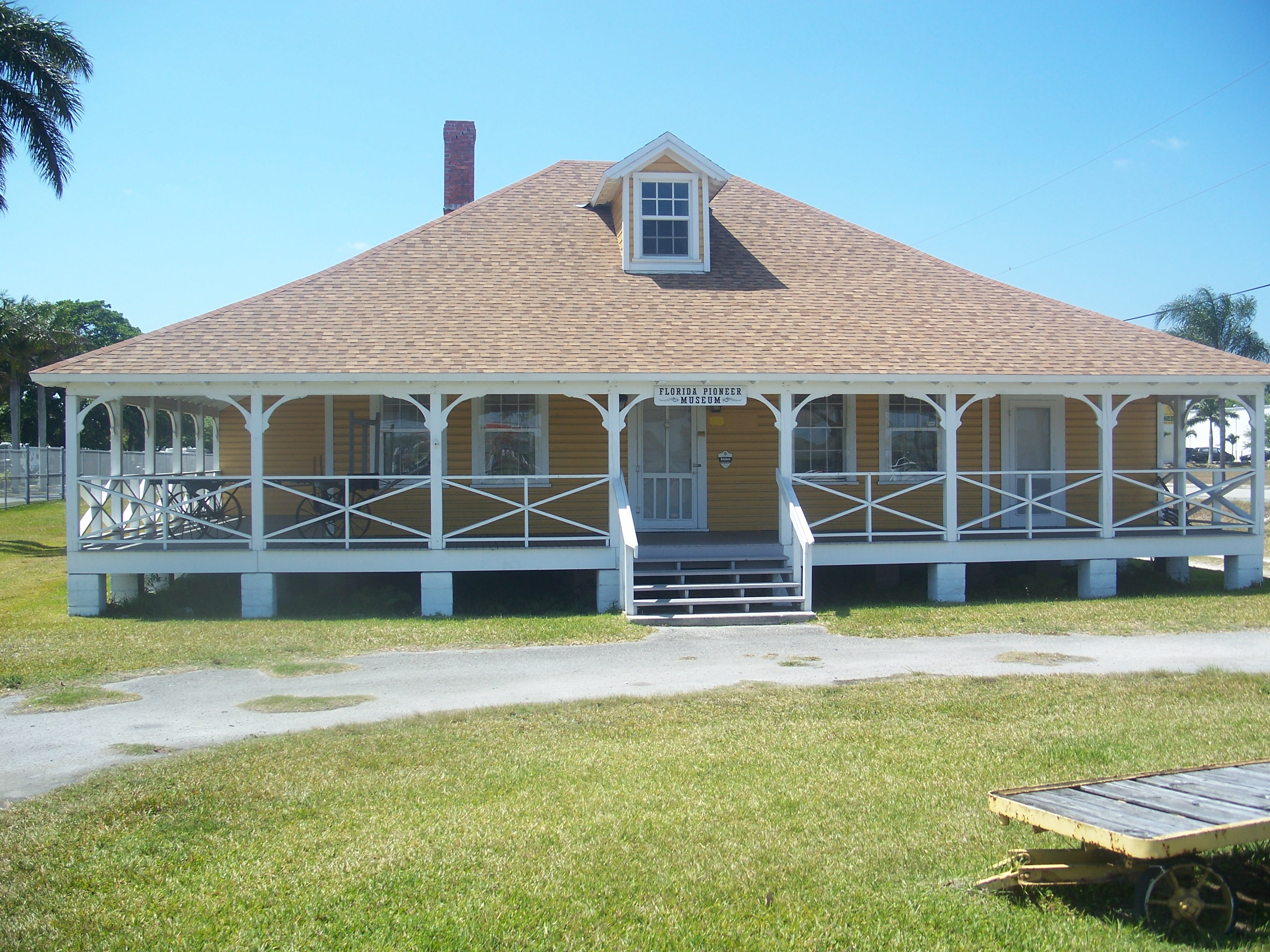

- Location within Florida
- Location: 0.5 mi. S of Lucy St. on FL 27 (Krome Ave.), Florida City, Florida
- Coordinates: 25°27′20″N 80°28′40″W
- Built: 1904
- Architect: Henry Morrison Flagler
- Architectural style: Philippine Style
- NRHP reference No.: 73000574
- Added to NRHP: August 14, 1973

The Florida Pioneer Museum is a historic site in Florida City, Florida, United States. It was founded in 1962 with the donation of Indian artifacts by Dr. Herbert S. Zim and tools by a group of civic minded women. On August 14, 1973, it was added to the U.S. National Register of Historic Places.

The Museum's building is located in the old Homestead Florida East Coast Railroad station agent's home that was built in 1904. The house was moved to the current location in the mid-1960s to serve as a museum about the local area. The land the building sits on was donated by Henry and Jacqueline Brooker. Henry was an early settler, homesteading west of the present city of Florida City in 1907. His wife, Jacqueline, was the daughter of Bryan H. Edwards, an early mayor of Florida City. The depot building behind the museum was saved by Jack Levy and other local history buffs as the bulldozers were starting to tear it down where it was originally located on N. Flagler Ave. in Homestead. The FEC and the City of Homestead had gotten into an argument over grounds maintenance so the FEC proceeded to demolish the building. It was then moved to its present site in Florida City in 1976, on land donated by the Torcise family. The building was leveled to the platform by Hurricane Andrew in 1992, and the Museum aided in the reconstruction of the building by supplying copies of the original drawings from the Florida East Coast Railway. The Depot is not part of the Museum; it is owned by the City of Florida City.

== History ==
The Florida East Coast Railway erected two bungalow buildings that were constructed in 1904 as the first buildings in the City of Homestead. Both building were residential, and were built for the section foremen and station agent. The homes were built two years before construction began by the Florida East Coast Railway in the area. Henry M. Flagler, an early settler of South Florida, designed the homes in the Philippine style to be well-suited for the South Florida climate.

On February 6, 1964, the house was moved to Florida City to land that was donated by Henry and Jackie Brooker Jr. Henry's father was one of the three men who first took residence in Florida City in 1911-1912. This move ensured the continued existence of the structure as it became the home of the Florida Pioneer Museum.

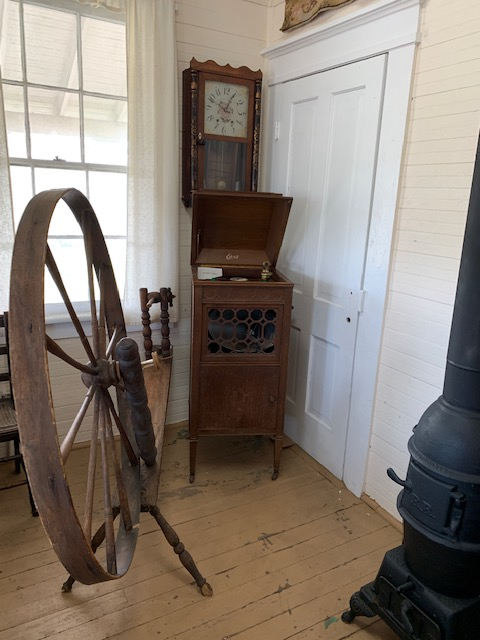
Some of the artifacts on display at the museum (Edison Phonograph and an original spinning wheel).

The community identified a need for a center to house a growing collection of local artifacts, and through the assistance of the Homestead Women's Club, the Pioneer Museum was created in this structure. Louise Hamilton was the founding president of the Pioneer Museum with Bea Peskoe as Vice President until they stepped down in 1970. The collection housed in the museum started with a donation from Herbert S. Zim, author of the Golden Nature Guides, of Native American artifacts. Other donors provided archaeological relics, shells, pioneer tools and implements, railroad memorabilia, household items, and other items owned and used by various local pioneer families. On August 14, 1973, the structure was added to the National Register of Historic Places.

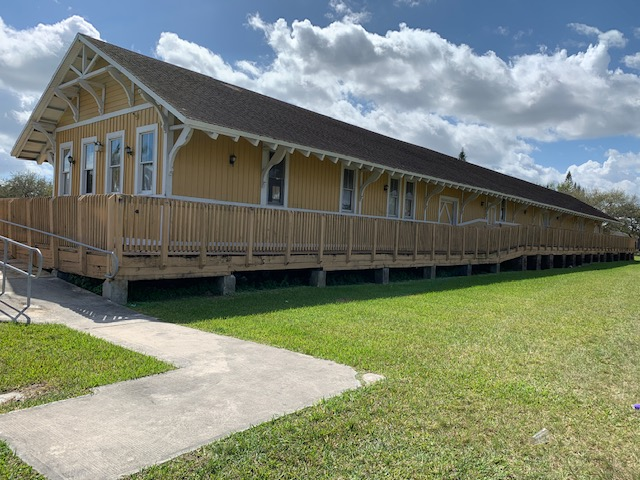
Replica train depot behind the museum.

In 1976, after years of allowing the dilapidation of the train depot on the original Homestead property, the Florida East Coast Railway planned a demolition of the depot. A group of local leaders raised $25,000 to stop the demolition and move the depot to the property behind the Florida Pioneer Museum. Another $200,000 was put into the restoration of the depot in 1988. Unfortunately, Hurricane Andrew leveled the depot in 1992. The current train depot on the property is a replica of the original.

The Museum is now owned by the City of Florida City and operated by the Florida Pioneer Museum Association.
