= Arden "Doc" Thomas House =

Historic house in Florida, United States

- U.S. National Register of Historic Places
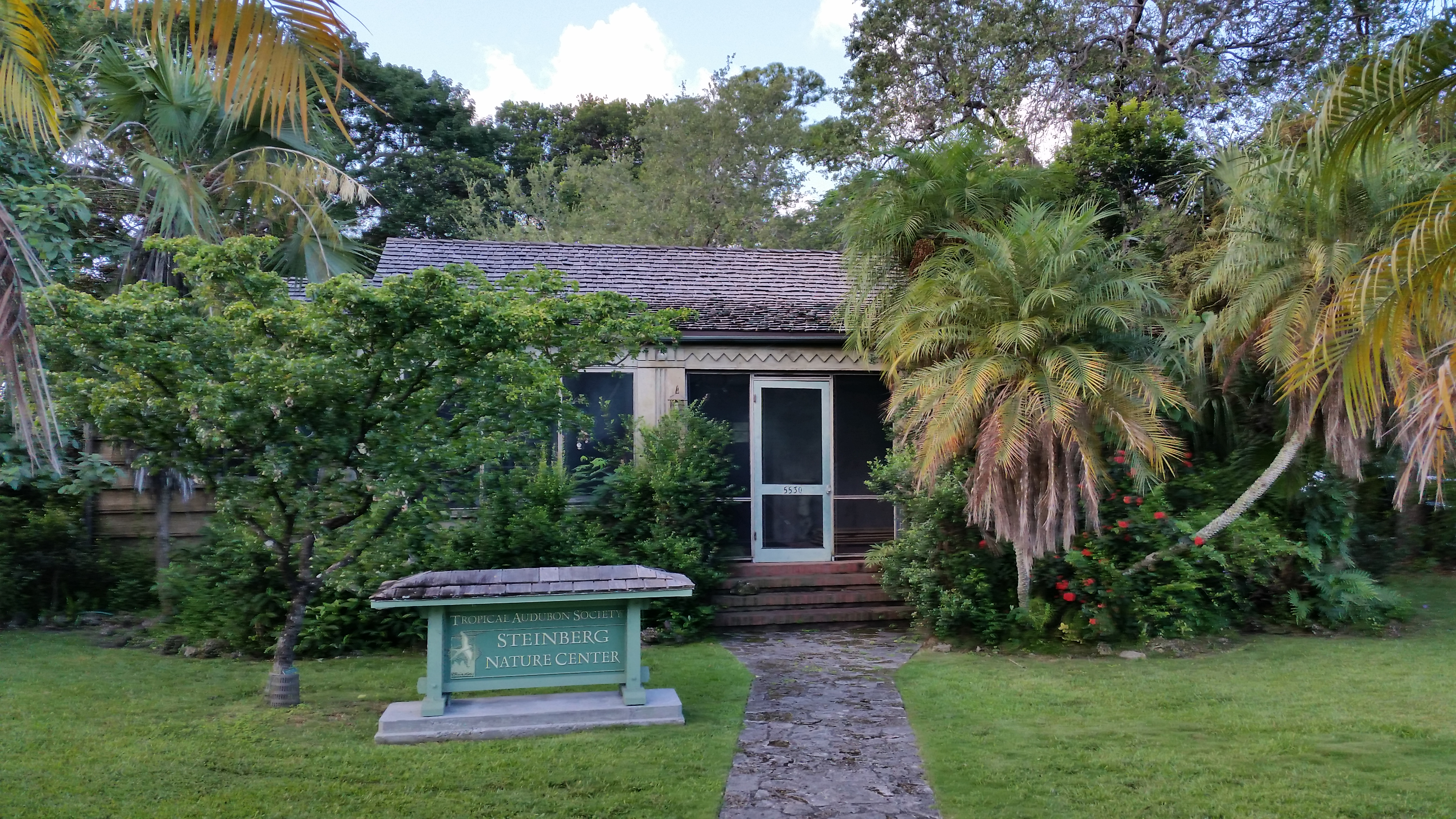
- Arden "Doc" Thomas House

- Location within Miami Location within Florida Location within the United States
- Location: 5530 Sunset Drive, South Miami, Florida
- Coordinates: 25°42′14″N 80°17′03″W
- NRHP reference No.: 14000320
- Added to NRHP: June 13, 2014

The "Doc" Thomas House is a national historic site located at 5530 Sunset Dr., just east of South Miami, Florida in Miami-Dade County. Completed in 1932, it was the residence of Arden Hayes Thomas, who had moved to Dade County from Indiana to open a drug store in the 1920s.

Thomas deeded the house and almost 2.2 acres of wooded property to Tropical Audubon Society in 1974. After his death on December 31, 1975, Tropical Audubon Society acquired the property; it has served as the organization's headquarters and a community resource since April, 1976. It was added to the National Register of Historic Places on June 13, 2014.
