= Entrance to Central Miami =

- U.S. National Register of Historic Places
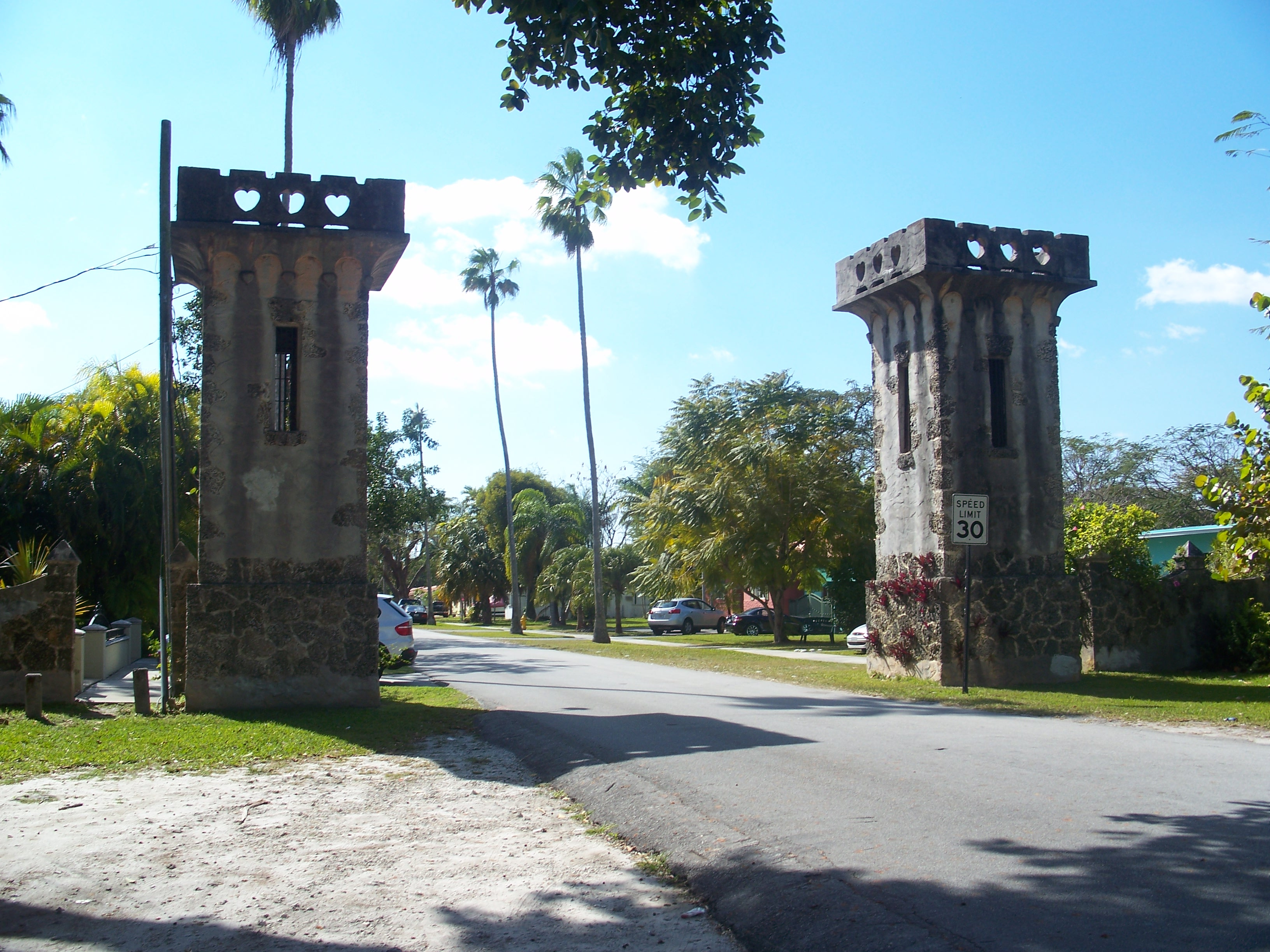

- Location within Miami Location within Florida Location within the United States
- Location: Coral Terrace, Florida, Florida
- Coordinates: 25°44′18.9234″N 80°17′14.1822″W
- NRHP reference No.: 88003199
- Added to NRHP: January 19, 1989

The Entrance to Central Miami (also known as Coral Gables Wayside Park) is a historic site in Coral Terrace, Florida, Florida. It is located west of Red Road between Southwest 34th and Southwest 35th Streets. It is operated by the Parks Department of Miami-Dade county. On January 19, 1989, it was added to the U.S. National Register of Historic Places.
