= North Shore Historic District (Miami Beach, Florida) =

Historic district in Florida, United States

- U.S. National Register of Historic Places
- U.S. Historic district
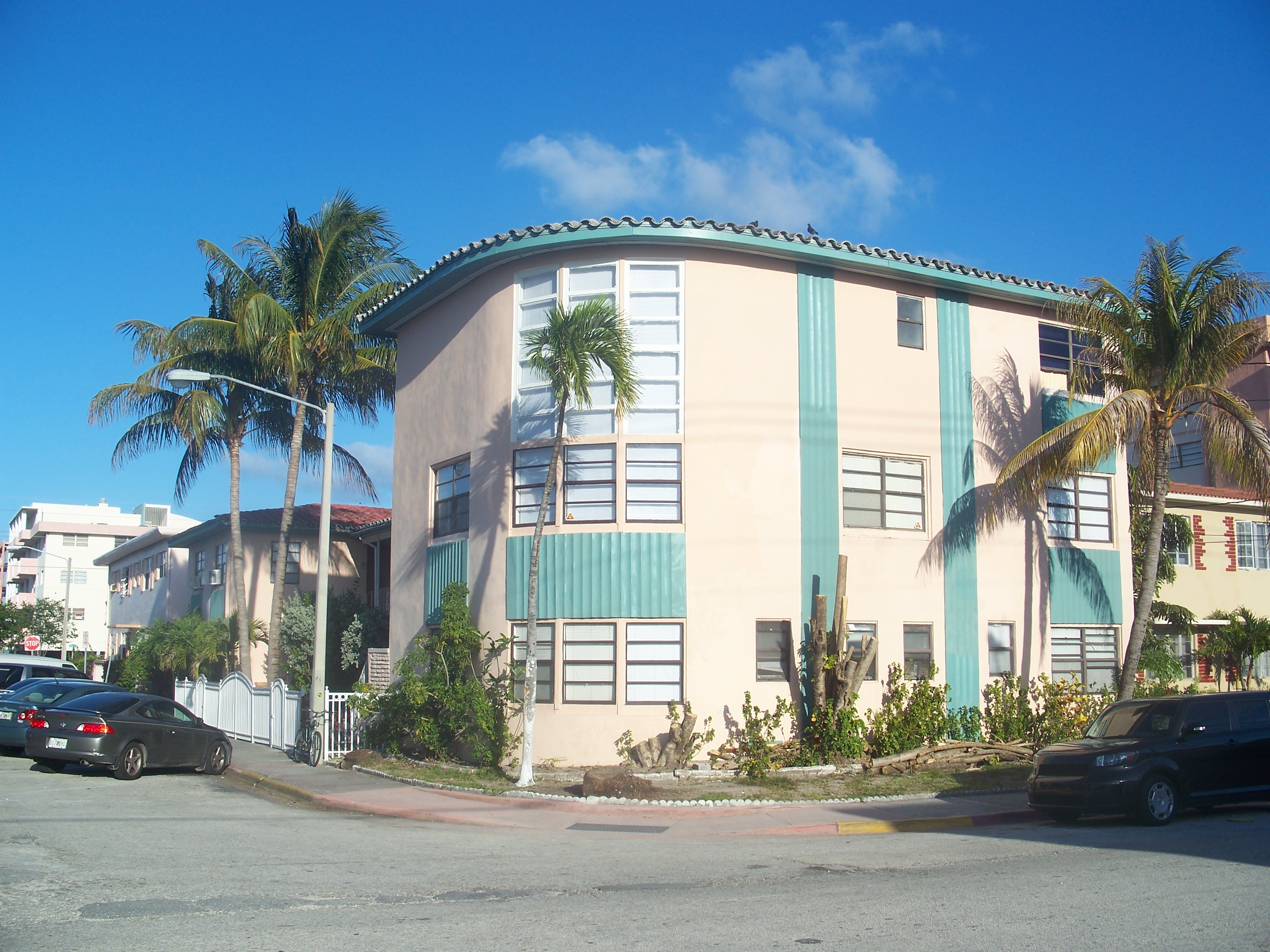

- Location within Miami Location within Florida Location within the United States
- Location: Miami Beach, Florida
- Coordinates: 25°51′40″N 80°7′29″W
- NRHP reference No.: 09000926
- Added to NRHP: November 18, 2009

The North Shore Historic District is a historic district in North Beach, Miami Beach, Florida, United States. The district is roughly bounded by 87th Street, Collins Avenue, 73rd Street, and Hawthorne Avenue. The architecture in the district is primarily of the Miami Modernism style, unique to greater Miami. Other architectural styles are reflected in the district, including Mediterranean Revival, Art Deco, and Moderne.
