= El Jardin =

- U.S. National Register of Historic Places
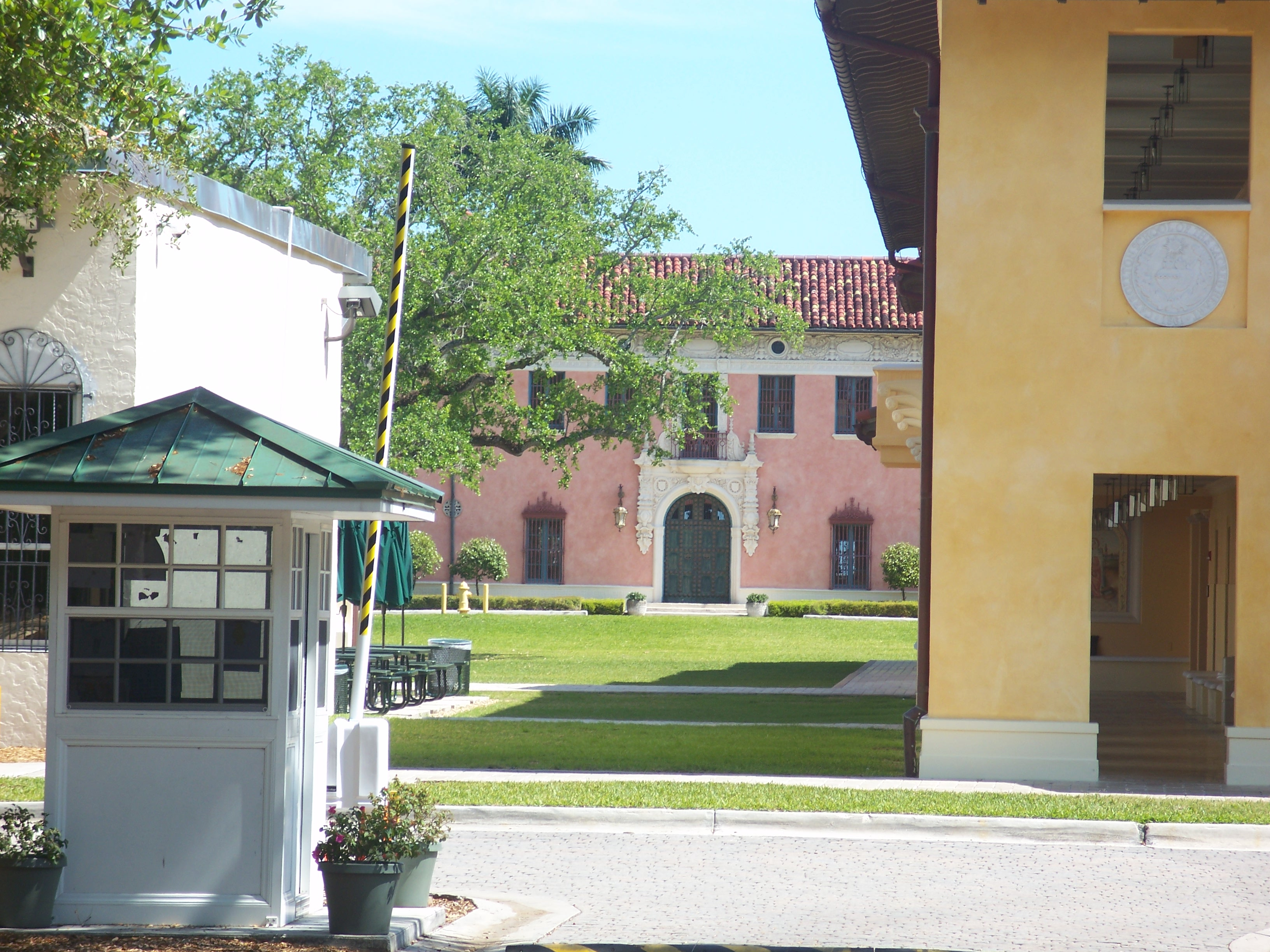

- Location within Miami Location within Florida Location within the United States
- Location: Miami, Florida
- Coordinates: 25°43′12.1296″N 80°14′49.056″W
- NRHP reference No.: 74000614
- Added to NRHP: August 30, 1974

El Jardin is a house located at 3747 Main Highway in Miami, Florida. It is listed on the U.S. National Register of Historic Places. El Jardin is now home to Carrollton School of the Sacred Heart in Miami, Florida. It was added to the U.S. National Register of Historic Places on August 30, 1974.

Built in 1918 along a ridge of oolitic limestone, El Jardin expresses the broad training of its architect, Richard Kiehnel of Kiehnel and Elliott, and the experience of its owner, John Bindley, then president of Pittsburgh Steel. Kiehnel, in a September 1928 article for Tropical Home and Garden, referred to the house as a “progenitor of the Modern Mediterranean style home.” Kiehnel relocated to Miami from Pittsburgh and became the architect for many landmark buildings, including the Coral Gables Congregational Church, Miami Senior High, and the Coral Gables Elementary School.
