= Rollins College Interracial Committee =

American collegiate student organization

The Rollins College Interracial Committee was a student-run organization at Rollins College with the aim of improving race relations, acting mainly through service projects for the African-American community throughout central Florida. The committee was founded in the mid-1930s. It was renamed to the "Rollins College Race Relations Committee" in 1945. It was renamed to the "Rollins Inter-Faith and Race Relations Committee" between the years 1949 and 1950. Notably, Fred Rogers, later famous for his role on Mister Rogers' Neighborhood, served as president during the 1950-1951 school year. The committee was disbanded between 1956 and 1960.

== History ==
=== Founding and early years ===
There is no record of the committee's existence prior to the 1936-1937 school year, and since several of its future projects (such as the Colored Grammar School and the Hungerford School) were being taken up by other committees until that time, it seems safe to assume that the committee was founded in 1936, when it was officially incorporated into the Knowles Memorial Chapel. Emily Showalter was elected as the first chair. However, there is no record of club activities until the 1938-1939 school year.

=== Disbanding ===
The last available records of the committee are for the 1955-1956 school year. Since the Knowles Memorial Chapel records for the latter half of the 1950s are not available, it is not known precisely when the committee disbanded; however, it was already out of existence before 1960.

== Notable projects ==
=== Hungerford School ===
Rollins College organizations were contributing to the Hungerford School in Eatonville, Florida, even before the Interracial Committee came into existence. However, it was placed under the Interracial Committee's umbrella sometime after its formation. Between 1938 and 1955, the Committee not only contributed regularly (if not yearly, though some years do not have adequate records to bear this out) to the Hungerford School, it consistently contributed the largest chunk of its budget. During that period, the Hungerford School used money donated by the committee to furnish a game room, purchase dining hall equipment, farm equipment, and a laundry ironer, among other things.

=== Winter Park Negro Grammar School ===
The Interracial Committee also contributed to a yearly Christmas party for students at the Winter Park Negro Grammar School beginning in 1938. The extent of the committee's contribution from year to year is not on record, however, in 1943, a letter from the school indicated that the committee's $5 contribution that year went toward "a gift and a box of candy for every child" and that other local organizations contributed as well. The Christmas parties continued until the 1954-1955 school year, when no line for the party appeared on the budget report. In addition to the annual Christmas party, the committee paid and arranged for lunches for students for "a limited period" during the 1946-1947 school year when the school encountered a shortage of funds.

=== Hannibal Square Library ===
The Interracial Committee began donating books to the Hannibal Square Library during the 1938-1939 school year, and regularly contributed throughout the committee’s existence.

=== Annual Race Relations Sundays ===
Beginning in 1945, the committee began sponsoring an Annual Race Relations Sunday, a service conducted in February at the Annie Russell Theatre. These Race Relations Sundays were structured like a religious gathering, with a sermon and music; however, films on race relations were often shown as well. Dean Henry M. Edmonds presided over the meetings until 1948, when Dean Theodore S. Darrah took over. Darrah presided over every Race Relations Sunday until at least 1955, the eleventh such event, which is the last recorded meeting. It is unclear whether or not they actually continued further.
