= NCSTL =

NCSTL may refer to:

- Nashville, Chattanooga and St. Louis Railway
- National Clearinghouse for Science, Technology and the Law
