= Greenfield Elementary School =

Greenfield Elementary School may refer to:

Listed alphabetically by state

- Greenfield Elementary School, in Gilbert, Arizona
- Greenfield Elementary School, in Jacksonville, Florida
- Greenfield Elementary School, in Greenfield, New Hampshire
- Greenfield Elementary School (Pittsburgh, Pennsylvania)
- Greenfield Elementary School, in Fort Worth, Texas
- Greenfield Elementary School, in Bon Air, Virginia
