= Coconut Grove Playhouse =

Theatre in Miami, Florida, United States

The Coconut Grove Playhouse
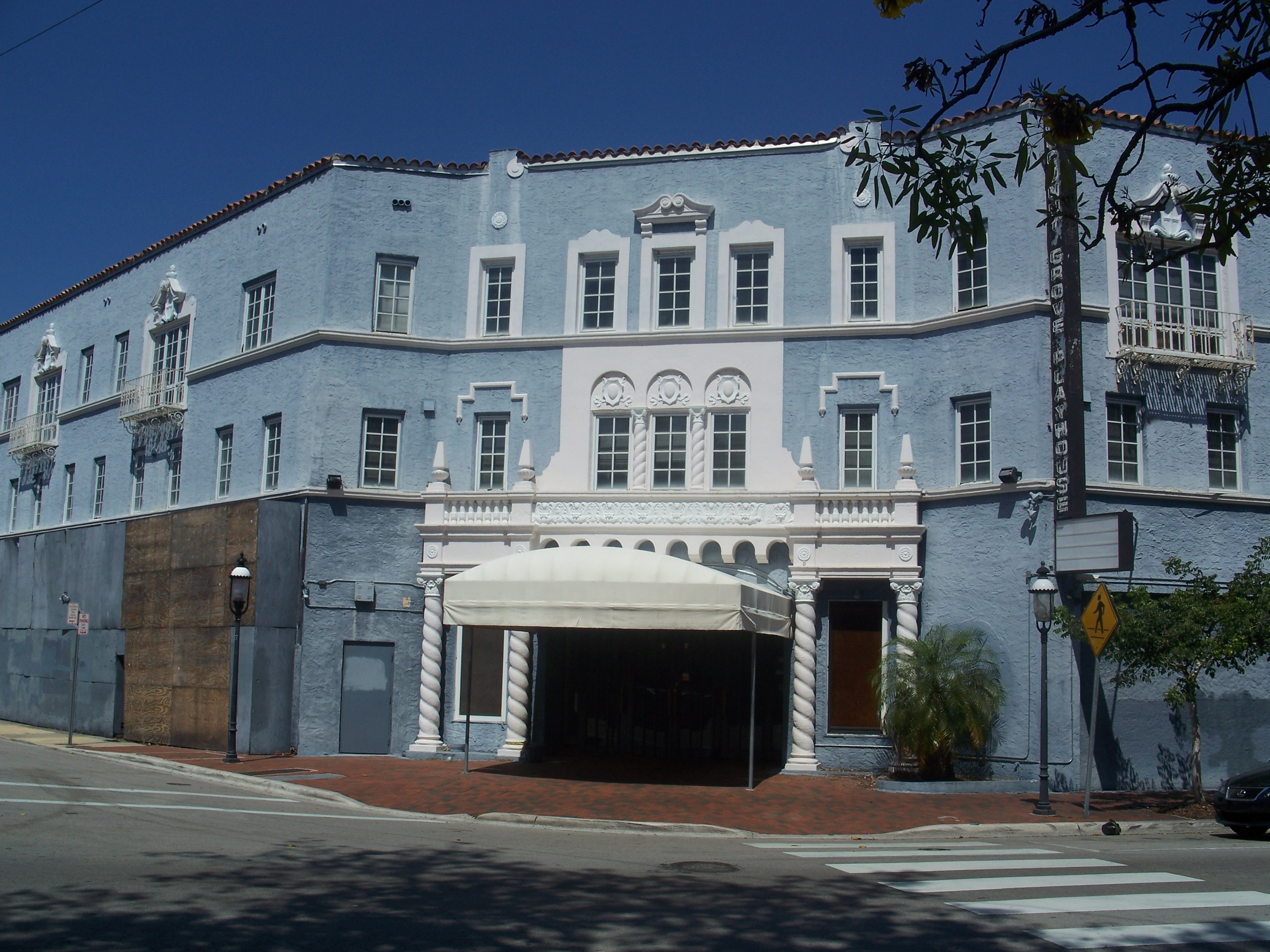
- Coconut Grove Playhouse
- Interactive map of the The Coconut Grove Playhouse area

General information
- Type: Theatre
- Location: Coconut Grove, Miami, Florida
- Coordinates: 25.7260°N 80.2449°W
- Inaugurated: 1 January 1927

Design and construction
- Architecture firm: Kiehnel and Elliott
- Main contractor: Albert Peacock

The Coconut Grove Playhouse was a theatre in the Coconut Grove neighborhood of Miami, Florida, United States. The building was originally constructed as a movie theater called the Player's State Theater. It opened on January 1, 1927, as a part of the Paramount chain. The movie house was designed by the architect Richard Kiehnel of Kiehnel and Elliott. It was built by local realtors Irving J. Thomas and Fin L. Pierce. Albert Peacock was the contractor.

The theater was renowned as the second movie theatre on the east coast of Florida to be air conditioned and having the largest Wurlitzer organ in the United States. It was used for a variety of shows until closing in 2006. It has not been used since. It was listed on the National Register of Historic Places in 2018.

== History ==
=== Founding ===
In the 1950s George Engle, an oilman, bought it and spent over $1 million (equivalent to $47 million in 2017) in renovations having the architect Alfred Browning Parker convert it to a live theatre. It reopened on January 3, 1956, with the US premiere of Samuel Beckett’s Waiting for Godot, starring Bert Lahr and Tom Ewell.

In the fifty years that have followed, the Playhouse has played host to many of theater's most renowned performers, including Maureen Stapleton, Hume Cronyn, Jessica Tandy, Eve Arden, Tallulah Bankhead, Carol Channing, Liza Minnelli, Linda Lavin, Bea Arthur, George C. Scott, Colleen Dewhurst, Ethel Merman, and Raúl Esparza.

=== Use by Miami Actors Company ===
Between 1964 and 1965, The Coconut Grove Playhouse was used by The Miami Actors Company, which was meant to be an extension of the National Theatre and Academy. The brainchild of Ilse Earl, who taught theatre classes at Miami Dade College, launched this effort. Only 20 actors from Miami and surrounding areas were chosen to become part of this historic event, out of more than 100 or so of those who were asked to audition.

The company was reviewed by The Miami Herald theatre critic at that time. Shows involved, among others, were J.B. by Archibald MacLeish; All the Way Home by Tad Mosel; and Slow Dance on the Killing Ground by William Hanley. Slow Dance was a hurried replacement which had to be put in place within ten days of rehearsal, replacing Hogan's Goat.

In 1966, the playhouse was purchased by Zev Buffman for $650,000. In 1970, Buffman sold it to Eddie Bracken for $1 million.

=== Change in artistic director ===
In 1982, actor-director José Ferrer was named artistic director, and under his supervision the Playhouse gained a reputation as one of the nation's leading theatres. In 1985, Arnold Mittelman was selected after a national search to succeed Mr. Ferrer. Among the productions that premiered here prior to a Broadway opening are Neil Simon’s The Sunshine Boys, starring Jack Klugman and Tony Randall, and Urban Cowboy. Sherry Glaser’s Family Secrets moved to off-Broadway and became its longest running one-woman show. The Playhouse presented the world premiere of Fame: The Musical, which went on to great success in Baltimore, Philadelphia, and London’s West End, and mounted a revival of Death of a Salesman, starring Hal Holbrook and Elizabeth Franz, prior to a national tour. The theatre now has two stages, the 1700-seat proscenium Mainstage Theater and the intimate 100-seat Encore Room Theater.

The Playhouse provided a broad range of programs for all ages, including the In-School Touring Program, which presented plays aimed at students in grades six through twelve, Lizard Lessons, original plays with music for kindergarten through third grade, a Summer Theater Camp for teens, and Theater Stages, which teaches acting techniques, playwriting, costume and scenery design, and improvisation to children, teens, and adult performers.

On November 22, 1996, Late Show with David Letterman originated from the theater. It was the last episode of the show not to originate from New York.

=== Closing and future ===
The Coconut Grove Playhouse closed in 2006. The theatre remains closed to this date. In January 2014, however, Miami-Dade County received permission from the State of Florida to take over the building.

At the time of the Miami-Dade County takeover, there were several ideas for the use of the space. The current plan is for a 300-seat theatre at the venue to be operated by GableStage, a renowned South Florida theatre company currently operating in a 150-seat theatre at the historic Biltmore Hotel. However, the founder and director of Gables Stage, Joseph Adler, died. Regardless, Miami-Dade still wants GableStage to work in association with Florida International University and their theatre department, working with them to provide students there with professional, real world experience. At the time of the approval, the City of Miami government waived 1.5 million dollars' worth of previously accumulated building violation fees.

The current plan would see 85% of the historic theatre demolished and only the facade preserved. Additionally, the current plan calls for retail and commercial offices as well as condominiums to fill the area where the main room which contained the stage and seats.

This plan was rivaled by a proposal for creating a 700-seat theatre at the space. The plan included areas for non-profit organizations to promote the arts by providing practice rooms and instruction. The group presenting this proposal was led by Mike Eidson, trust chairman at the Adrienne Arsht Center, a large performance complex in downtown Miami. Eidson's involvement in the deal was separate from his position at the Arsht Center. This proposal was not passed, however it is still being considered as an option. A county chairman encouraged Eidson to "postpone" his plans, suggesting that the idea is not completely out of sight.

The 700-seat theatre option has received mixed reviews. Ann Anthony, executive director of Miami's Mad Cat Theatre Company, is one of the plan's many opponents. She cited the difficulty of filling a large theatre and the presence of two large theatres nearby, the Miracle Theatre and the venues at the Adrienne Arsht Center. Many people support the plan though, hoping that with Kevin Spacey's backing that the theatre could bring in big stars and become a prominent regional theatre once again.

After a long bidding process between nine architecture firms, Miami-Dade county commissioners voted for Arquitectonica to help demolish a large portion of the venue and commercialize it. $20 million in voter-approved bond money has been set aside to fund this project. The building is deemed a historical landmark so it cannot be fully demolished, but many residents are concerned that much of the building will not be preserved.

Preservation architect Richard Heisenbottle sketched a plan for the restoration of the venue that could fit the smaller 300-seat space and the 700-seat theatre proposed by Eidson, and keep all of the original exterior. Upon this development, Arquitectonica was tasked with looking into the budgetary requirements for this plan as well as how much of the historic architecture could be saved if the venue had two performance spaces.
