= Miami Senior High School =

Public high school in Miami, Florida, United States

Location
- 2450 Southwest 1st Street; Miami, Florida 33135; United States

Information
- School type: Public, high school
- Motto: Non verbis sed operis (Not by words, but deeds)
- Established: 1903
- School district: Miami-Dade County Public Schools
- Principal: Benny Valdés
- Teaching staff: 126.00 (FTE)
- Grades: 9–12
- Enrollment: 3,100 (2024–25)
- Student to teacher ratio: 24.60
- Colors: Blue and gold
- Mascot: "Whippy" the Stingray
- Nickname: Stingrays
- Yearbook: The Miahi
- Website: www.miamiseniorhigh.org
- Miami Senior High School
- U.S. National Register of Historic Places
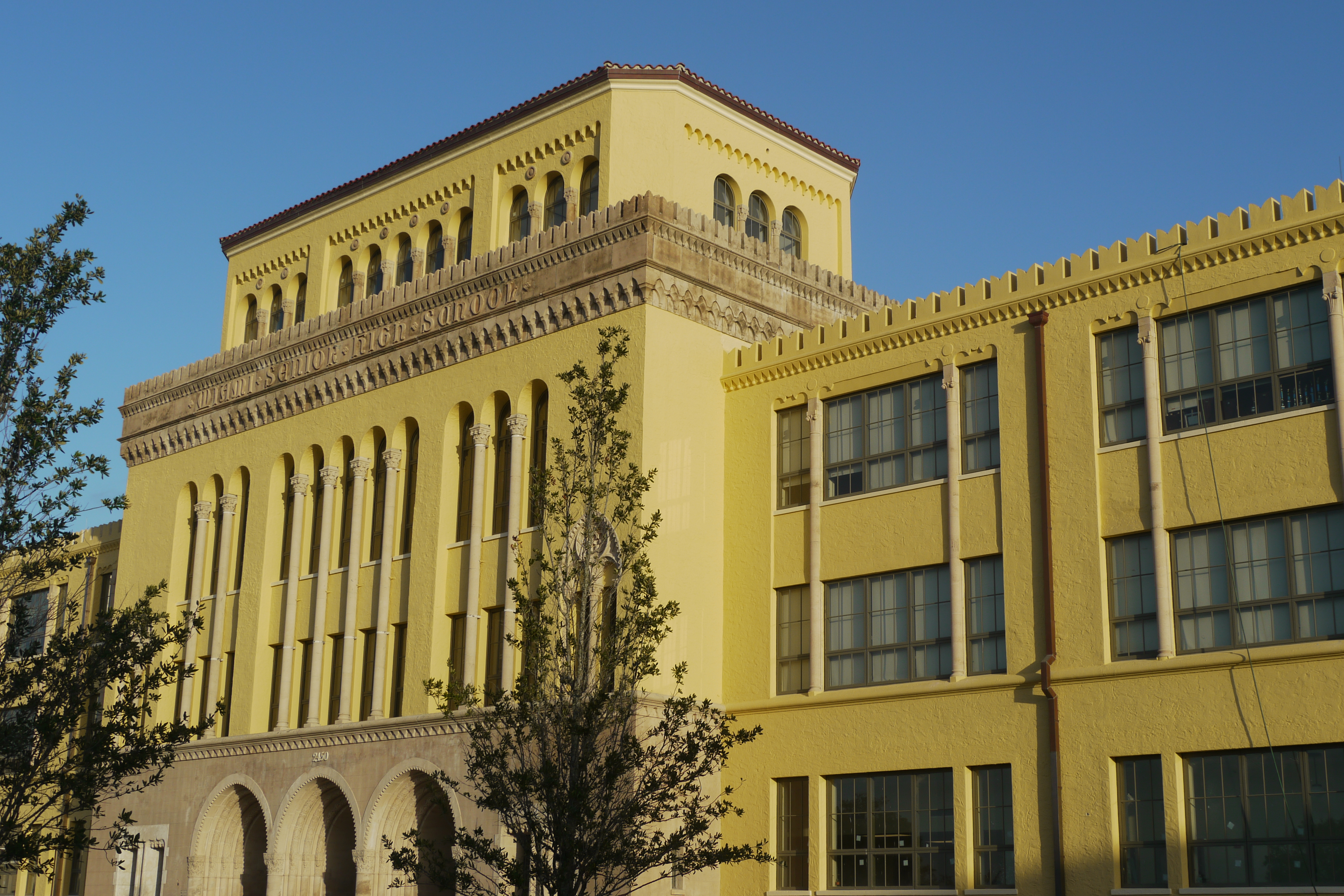
- Miami Senior High School, July 2013

- Location within Miami Location within Florida Location within the United States
- Coordinates: 25°46′16″N 80°14′10″W
- Area: 19 acres (7.7 ha)
- Built: 1928
- Architect: Kiehnel and Elliott
- Architectural style: Late 19th- and 20th-century revivals, Mediterranean Revival with Moorish elements
- NRHP reference No.: 90000881
- Added to NRHP: June 18, 1990

Miami Senior High School, also known as Miami High School, is a public high school located at 2450 SW 1st Street in Miami, Florida, and operated by Miami-Dade County Public Schools. Founded in 1903, it is one of the oldest high schools in Miami-Dade County. The school building is famous for its architecture and is a historic landmark. Miami Senior High School has a rich alumni base, with many graduates of the high school going on to varied, prominent careers. The high school originally served the earliest settling families of Miami in the first half of the 20th century. By the late 1960s, with an increase in Miami's population, its student body grew at a fast pace.

== History ==
Miami Senior High School was established in 1903 and was the first high school in what is now Miami-Dade County. Originally, high school classes took place in Miami's first schoolhouse, a two-story frame structure that was built in 1898 on what is now NE 1st Avenue, between 3rd and 4th Streets. This building, considered temporary, was a one-story frame bungalow addition built directly behind the existing schoolhouse. It opened its doors on September 18, 1905, with 29 girls and 20 boys in attendance.

In 1909, the school board decided to build a new schoolhouse to again house all grammar and high school students together. In 1911, a new three-story concrete schoolhouse opened its doors. The original one-story high school building was moved to SW 12th Street and 1st Avenue, repainted, and opened as the Southside Elementary School. After a new Southside Elementary School was constructed in 1914, the original high school building fell into decades of neglect, operating as a boarding house for 90 years. It was "discovered" in 1983 by a local historian and, in January 2003, was moved to its current location in Southside Park, where it has since been renovated and opened as a community center.

Miami Senior High School's current building is its fourth home. The school board selected a fifteen-acre campus in the middle of what was then a pine forest. Groundbreaking occurred early in 1926, but due to the Great Miami Hurricane of 1926, the school's opening was delayed. Finally finished in 1928, the building was designed in a Spanish Mediterranean style with Moorish and Byzantine details by Richard Kiehnel of Kiehnel and Elliott, one of the great early Miami architects. He gave the school an impressive entrance off Flagler Street "of three arched portals befitting a Gothic cathedral," according to the American Institute of Architects' Miami architecture guide. The building is listed on the U.S. National Register of Historic Places.

1968 was a significant year for Miami Senior High School. Structural changes were made to accommodate a newly installed air conditioning system that closed off the building's high ceilings. The original windows on the building were sealed with bricks before the completion of the work, and students suffered in hot classrooms for a large portion of the year. This was also the year of the major Florida statewide teachers' strike, which caused students’ classes to be in chaos due to having many newly hired substitute teachers, while their regular teachers walked picket lines for weeks.

== Demographics ==
Located in the Little Havana neighborhood, the school was founded in 1903. Since the late 1960s, the high school has traditionally had a Cuban-American majority. Today, a growing number of students are of Central American descent, reflecting demographic changes in Little Havana since the 1990s.

As of 2013, Miami Senior High School is 94% Hispanic (primarily Cuban, Honduran, Guatemalan, and Salvadorean), 3% White (non-Hispanic), and 3% Black.

By the 1950s, a large Jewish minority had developed at Miami Senior High School, and Jewish students made up the majority of the students in some advanced-level classes. During that decade some Jewish students were in the attendance zone for Coral Gables Senior High School but were instead sent to Miami High; this was especially the case with girls, as many high-status girls' clubs at Coral Gables High did not admit Jewish students. A patio called "Little Jerusalem" or "LJ" (initially "Little Israel" in the 1950s) was where Jewish students socialized.

In 1984, the student newspaper declared Spanglish the official language of Miami Senior High School. Then, like today, most students at the school spoke fluent Spanish and English. 69% of the school's students graduate, and it has an overall dropout rate of 4%.

== Historic architectural restoration ==
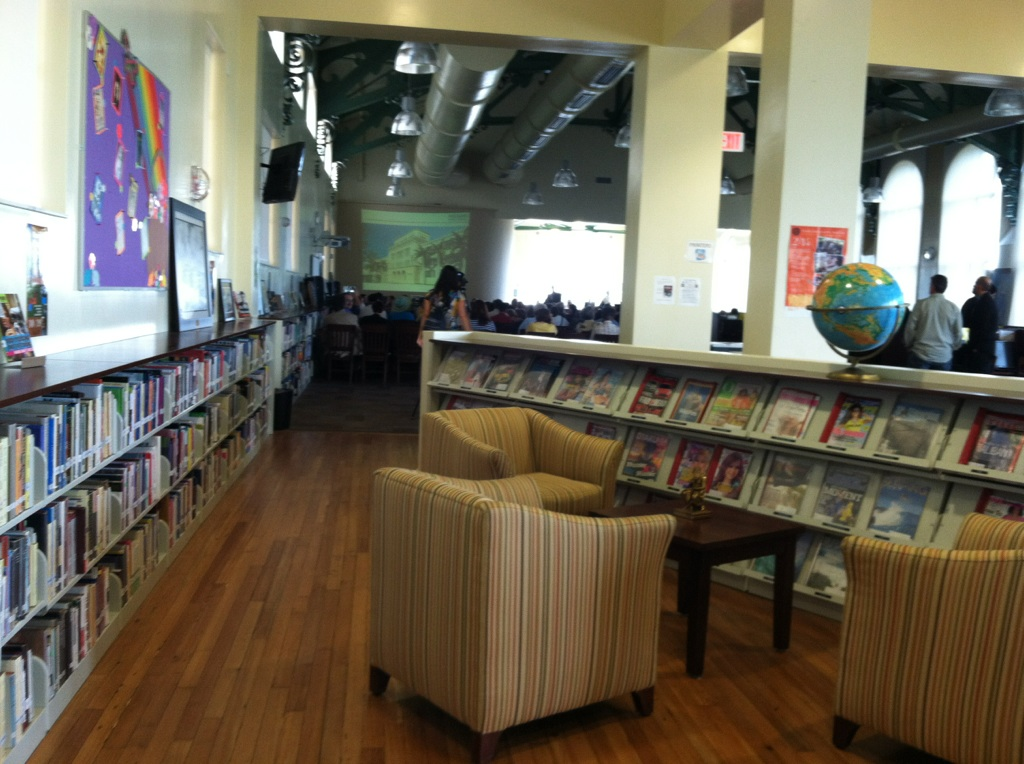
Miami High Media Center

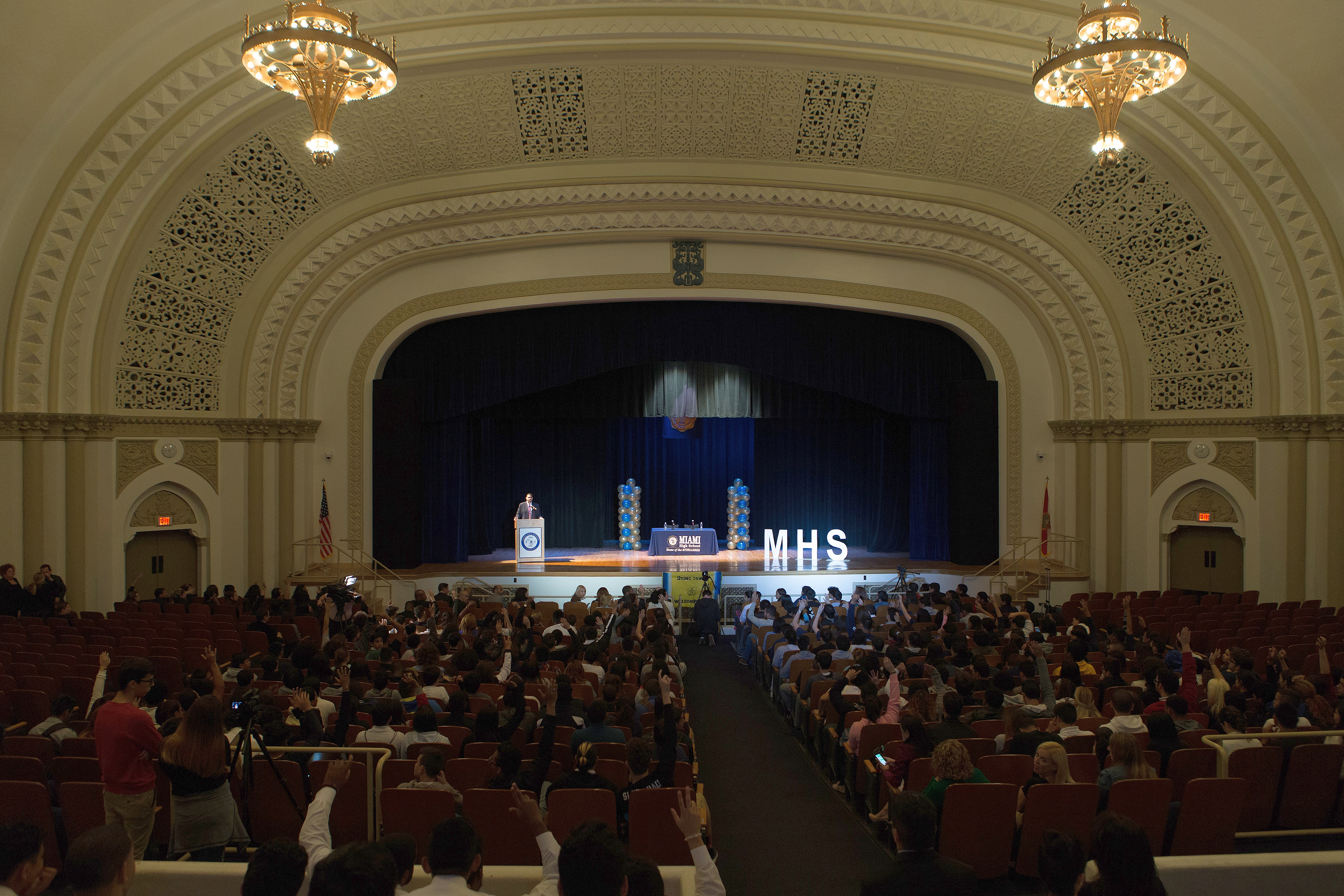
U.S. Secretary of Education John King Jr. speaks at Miami High School, 2016

Beginning in 2010, Miami Senior High School underwent a four-year historic restoration, renovation, and remodeling project at a cost of approximately $55 million. Project architect Thorn Grafton of Zyscovich Architects, who is the grandson of Miami Beach pioneering architect Russell Pancoast, was one of the people who undertook the renovation project. Completed in April 2014, the project did away with the dropped ceilings that had accommodated an old air conditioning system and restored the original high ceilings and decorative cast-stone vent screens in the halls. It also reopened the original second-story arcade, removed an office expansion that had blocked part of the courtyard, and restored the original 14-foot arched windows and steel-trussed cathedral ceiling in the old library (now a media center).

== Notable alumni ==
- Rudy Árias - former major league baseball catcher and coach.
- Desi Arnaz - bandleader, actor, TV producer, star of I Love Lucy
- Atari Bigby - NFL, Green Bay Packers
- Steve Blake - Former NBA player, did not graduate
- Eddie Brown - NFL player
- Jeff Coopwood - Emmy-nominated actor, broadcaster and singer
- John Dasburg - CEO of Burger King
- Jim Dooley - NFL head coach and player, Chicago Bears
- Allen Edwards - college basketball player and coach
- Doug Edwards - NBA player, Atlanta Hawks
- Steven Edwards, basketball player
- Willy Falcon - a former drug kingpin, one of the most significant cocaine trafficking organizations in South Florida history. did not graduate
- Robert L. Floyd - former Mayor of Miami, State Representative, Judge, and Miami Sheriff
- Ileana Garcia - Member of the Florida Senate
- Luis Garcia - MLB player, Baltimore Orioles
- Christopher George (1929–1983) - film and television actor, star of The Rat Patrol and U.S. Marine
- Edmond Gong - first Asian American elected to Florida House and Senate
- Bob Graham - Governor of Florida and U.S. Senator
- Phil Graham - publisher of Washington Post
- Anthony Grant - head basketball coach, University of Dayton
- Carol Hanson - Florida State Representative (1982-1994) and Mayor of Boca Raton (1995-2001)
- Udonis Haslem - NBA player, Miami Heat; 3-time NBA champion
- Steve Hertz - MLB player and Israel Baseball League manager
- Lindy Infante - NFL head coach, Green Bay Packers and Indianapolis Colts
- Jamaal Jackson - NFL center
- Andre Johnson - NFL wide receiver, Houston Texans and Tennessee Titans
- Lonnie Johnson – NFL player
- Donald Justice - Pulitzer Prize-winning poet
- Veronica Lake - actress, star of such 1940s films as Sullivan's Travels and This Gun for Hire
- Mike Levy - founder and former CEO of SportsLine.com, now CBSSports.com
- Sal Magluta former drug kingpin and powerboat racer who, along with his partner Willy Falcon, operated one of the most significant cocaine trafficking organizations in South Florida history. did not graduate
- Marquand Manuel - NFL player, defensive coordinator of Atlanta Falcons
- Frank Martin - head basketball coach, UMass
- Delrish Moss - Miami law enforcement veteran appointed as Police Chief of Ferguson, Missouri, a suburb of St. Louis known for racial unrest
- Gardnar Mulloy - tennis player, 4-time U.S. Open doubles champion
- Fred Ottman - professional wrestler
- Alfred Browning Parker - architect
- Roscoe Parrish - NFL wide receiver, San Diego Chargers
- Juan Pena, MLB player, Boston Red Sox
- Ed Roberts - designed first commercially successful personal computer in 1975
- Mandy Romero- MLB player (San Diego Padres, Boston Red Sox, Colorado Rockies)
- Al Rosen (1924-2015) - MLB player, 4-time All-Star, 1948 World Series champion, 1953 MVP
- Mike Schemer (1917–1983) - MLB player
- Felix Semper - World renowned Artist/Sculptor stretchable paper sculptures, graduated in 1983
- Robert Shevin - Former Florida Attorney General, Member of the Florida Senate and Florida House of Representatives; 3rd District Court of Appeals Judge
- David A. Siegel - businessman
- George Smathers - U.S. Senator
- Bob Stinson - MLB player for six teams
- Mario Valdez - MLB player (Chicago White Sox, Oakland Athletics)
- Brent Wright - professional basketball player in Europe
- George Smathers, U.S. senator, 1920s
- Veronica Lake, actress and model, 1930s
- Bob Graham, Florida governor and U.S. senator, Class of 1955
- Ed Roberts, "father of the PC", computer engineer, 1950s
- Steve Blake, NBA basketball player, Class of 1998
- Al Rosen, MLB 4x All Star and MVP baseball player
- Christopher George, actor, 1940s
- Jeff Coopwood, Emmy-nominated actor, broadcaster and singer, 1970s
- Andre Johnson, NFL football player, Class of 1999
- Udonis Haslem, NBA Basketball Player, Class of 1996

== In pop culture ==
Movies including The Substitute and Porky's were filmed at MHS, as well as the music videos for Gloria Estefan and NSYNC's "Music of My Heart" and Drake's "God's Plan".

== See also ==
- Education in the United States
