= Rolyat Hotel =

Hotel building in Florida, United States

Coordinates: 27.756°N 82.719°W

Stetson University College of Law main tower - formerly the Rolyat Hotel

The Rolyat Hotel, now the Stetson University College of Law, is located in Gulfport, Florida in Pinellas County on the west coast of Florida.

In the early 1900s, Gulfport experienced its share of the Great Florida Land Boom, with the development of Pasadena-on-the-Gulf, now called Pasadena Estates. Pasadena Progress was the official newsletter published for the new Pasadena-on-the-Gulf community. This development was designed as a "residential paradise", and the Rolyat Hotel was the last phase of construction before the Great Depression hit.

Built in 1925, the Hotel Rolyat (Taylor spelled backwards) was named after I.M. Jack Taylor, its owner and the president of Pasadena Estates, also known as "Handsome Jack" Taylor. The architectural firm of Kiehnel & Elliott of Miami, Florida designed the Spanish-themed hotel under the direction of project architect Paul Reed. George A. Fuller Construction Company of New York City served as the general contractor and John Wanamaker supplied the furnishings and china. The Rolyat opened January 1, 1926 with celebrities in attendance and champagne flowing in the main fountain.

== Description ==
=== Architecture ===
Designed to replicate a Spanish feudal castle with buildings surrounding a central plaza. The main tower was designed to resemble the Torre Del Oro (Tower of Gold) in Seville, Spain. The Rolyat boasted 100 guest rooms on its property of several buildings, towers, fountains and arcades. The roof tiles came from Spanish monasteries; they were made by hand and created by shaping the clay over the upper leg. "All the woodwork is of solid cypress timbers colored and antiqued...with wooded trusses having ornamental bands-and the wooden timbers are brilliantly decorated with many colors on Medieval lines."

=== Amenities ===
- Horse stables
- Golf
- Fishing
- Tropical gardens

==== Rolyat Hotel Owner/Operators ====
- I.M. Jack Taylor 1925-1927
- Soren Lund 1928 (leased)
- Hugh Jay Fuller Company, New York 1929

== Famous Guests ==
=== Baseball ===
- George Herman "Babe" Ruth
- Jimmie Foxx
- Mickey Cochrane
- Rube Marquard
- Cy Perkins

=== Golf ===
- Walter Hagen
- Chick Evans
- Gene Sarazen
- Jock Hutchinson
- Joe Kirkwood, Sr.
- Laurie Ayton
- Bob Macdonald
- Bobby Jones

=== Socialites/Entertainers ===
- Cornelius Vanderbilt III
- Daniel Guggenheim
- Frieda Hempel - Opera singer
- Galli-Curci - Opera singer

== Historical events ==
- Babe Ruth signed his 1932 Yankees contract officially in the lounge and a second time for photographs in the Plaza Mayor at the Rolyat Hotel.
- John Coolidge (son of ex-President Calvin Coolidge) and Florence Trumbull's hosted their 1928 engagement party at the hotel.

== Past and Current Occupants ==
- Florida Military Academy (1932-1951)
- Stetson University College of Law (1954–present)

== Photographs ==
Hotel Rolyat Burgert Brothers Photographs
