= Carrollton School of the Sacred Heart =

Private college-prep school in Coconut Grove, Miami, Florida, United States

Location
- 3747 Main Highway; Coconut Grove, Miami, (Miami-Dade County), Florida 33133; United States; 25°43′14″N 80°14′52″W

Information
- Type: Private, Day, College-prep
- Religious affiliations: Roman Catholic, Society of the Sacred Heart
- Established: 1961
- Founder: St. Madeleine Sophie Barat
- Area trustee: Tony Argiz
- President: Patrick Coyle
- Head of school: Heather Gillingham-Rivas
- Grades: PK–12
- Gender: Girls
- Enrollment: 862
- Colors: Blue and Gold
- Team name: Cyclones
- Accreditation: Southern Association of Colleges and Schools
- Director of Advancement: Denise Ortega
- Admissions Director: Iliana Hamilton
- Athletic Director: Matt Althage
- Website: www.carrollton.org

Carrollton School of the Sacred Heart is a Catholic college preparatory day school for girls, founded in 1961 in Coconut Grove, Miami, Florida.

== Description ==
Carrollton School of the Sacred Heart was founded in 1961. Its oldest building, El Jardin, built in 1918, was donated to the Society of the Sacred Heart by the O’Neil family. The school now resides across two campuses in Coconut Grove, Florida, and still uses El Jardin for classes, along with many other buildings. El Jardin is part of the Barat Campus, named after St. Madeline Sophie Barat, the founding mother of the Sacred Heart. Carrollton has a student population of around 862.

A member of the Network of Sacred Heart Schools, Carrollton is divided into five independent learning communities or schools: Montessori, Primary, Intermediate, Junior High and High School. Montessori, Primary, and Intermediate, are all part of Lower School. Junior High and High School are known as Upper School.

Carrollton has a nationally recognized debate and robotics team. In 2007, the school hosted a national robotics competition. Its athletic mascot is the Carrollton Cyclone.

In 2023, Carrollton was ranked the #1 Catholic and All-Girls High School in Florida.

== History ==
In 2019, the school had plans to build an elementary school for boys on the property of Villa Woodbine, which prompted complaints from area residents.

== Alumnae ==
- Sofia Carson, actress
- Lauren Jauregui, singer and member of Fifth Harmony
- Kathryn Newton, actress
- Ana Navarro, political strategist and television commentator
- Génesis Rodríguez, actress
- Nicole Lopez-Alvar , TV personality and journalist
