= Stetson University College of Law =

Law school in Florida, US

Coordinates: 27.756559°N 82.718199°W

- Established: 1900; 126 years ago
- School type: Private law school
- Parent endowment: US$47.6 million
- Dean: D. Benjamin Barros
- Location: Gulfport, Florida, U.S.
- Enrollment: 926
- Faculty: 47
- USNWR ranking: 91st (tie) (2026)
- Bar pass rate: 78.8% (Florida bar exam, July 2021 first-time takers)
- Website: stetson.edu/law/

The Stetson University College of Law (branded as Stetson Law) is the law school of Stetson University, located in Gulfport, Florida.

The law school occupies a historic 1920s resort hotel, the Rolyat Hotel, designed by Richard Kiehnel. The College of Law is accredited by the American Bar Association and has been a member of the Association of American Law Schools since 1931.

== Academics ==
Stetson School of Law main tower as seen from the main courtyard (inspired by Torre del Oro in the city of Seville)

Stetson Law currently employs more than 40 full-time faculty members and has more than 900 students enrolled in its Juris Doctor (J.D.) program. Stetson also offers a Master of Laws (LL.M.) and a Master of Jurisprudence. The J.D. degree may be combined with an LL.M or a Master of Business Administration (M.B.A.) with the Stetson University School of Business Administration. The J.D. degree may also be combined with an exchange program: an LL.M. in Exchange in Ireland/England with the University College Dublin Sutherland School of Law, a Master in International Economic Law with Toulouse University or a Master in International and European Business Law with Comillas Pontifical University.

The school is home to several institutes including the National Clearinghouse for Science, Technology and the Law.

=== Admissions ===
For the class entering in 2023, the school accepted 38.39% of applicants, with 35.24% of those accepted enrolling. The median enrollee had a 158 LSAT score and 3.59 undergraduate GPA. Its 25th/75th percentile LSAT scores and GPAs were 156/159 and 3.34/3.77.

=== Clinics ===
Stetson Law guarantees a clinic or externship for every student. More than 300 clinic and externship opportunities are available to students each year.

=== Publications ===
The Stetson Law Review was the headquarters for the National Conference of Law Reviews from 2003 to 2008. The Journal of International Wildlife Law and Policy and the Journal of International Aging Law and Policy are produced in conjunction with the school.

=== Bar examination passage ===
Stetson had a 74.4 percent first-time Bar passage rate for takers of the October 2020 Florida Bar Examination. 77.6 percent passed the July 2019 exam, 67.2 percent passed the July 2018 exam and 76.8 percent passed the July 2017 exam.

=== Competitions ===
Since 1980, Stetson Law has won five world championships, 79 national championships, 97 regional championships, 53 state championships, 61 brief awards, 176 brief oralist/advocate awards and six professionalism awards.

As of 2021, Stetson Law has won The Florida Bar Trial Lawyers Section of the Chester Bedell Mock Trial Competition 25 times in 38 years.

Stetson Law was the first American Bar Association (ABA) Competitions Champion in 2018 and earned the title for a second time in 2021.

Stetson Law won The Florida Bar Foundation 2021 Florida Pro Bono Law School Challenge.

== Law libraries ==
=== History of Stetson's law libraries ===
As the Board of Trustees authorized the establishment of the Stetson University College of Law in 1899, creating a law library immediately became a concern. To create a core collection for the law library, book and monetary donations were sought and obtained from Florida attorneys. By its opening in October 1900, the College of Law had a law library and the 1901 annual report indicated that the library donation goals had been met.

Upon the law school's move from DeLand to Gulfport in 1954, the library collection also had to be moved. The new house for the law library consisted of "several small cubicles" and at the time "all the law books 'fit into one moving van.'" The collection contained fewer than 18,000 books. In 1955, an anonymous donor pledged $250,000 to assist in paying for the creation of a new law library and classroom building. Within one year, the law school was able to raise the money to match the anonymous donation and met its $750,000 goal. It became known that the anonymous donor was Charles A. Dana and the Charles A. Dana Foundation. Construction on the new Charles A. Dana Library began in 1957. Students and staff transferred the small law library collection from the original location on the Gulfport campus to the new library in less than thirty minutes. This new library included space to expand the collection (housing for 70,000 volumes) and study space for 100 students. In 1958, the Charles A. Dana Law Library opened. The dedication of the library, made in the presence of Charles A. Dana, included a convocation by Florida's Governor, LeRoy Collins. The Charles A. Dana Foundation provided a gift in 1971 for the purpose of doubling the law library's size. The school completed the expansion in 1973 and provided space for 275 students and 160,000 volumes. During this time, the Charles A. Dana Library also became "the first law library in Florida to be a depositary for Federal Government documents." By 1981, the library's collection contained more than 165,182 volumes.

By the mid-1990s, Stetson University College of Law "had been put on notice years earlier that its library was on shaky grounds regarding ABA requirements, and that the problems were of such magnitude that a new structure might have to be built." Some individuals did not believe a new library was warranted as they doubted the future of libraries, but Dean Moody proceeded with the planning stated by her predecessor Dean Bruce Jacob, emeritus Law Librarian Lamar Woodard, and architect Canerday. In 1998, the new facility, named Stetson Law Library and Information Center, was completed. The new facility provided 58,000 square feet and had ample accommodation for the current collection (350,000 volumes), as well as "government documents, and other traditional resource materials." United States Supreme Court Associate Justice Ruth Bader Ginsburg spoke at the new library's dedication on September 5, 1998.

In 2004, Stetson University College of Law opened its Tampa Law Center with a satellite library. In 2010, Stetson University College of Law renamed the Stetson Law Library and Information Center for philanthropists Frances R. "Dolly" and Homer Hand. The renaming occurred as part of the College of Law's celebration of its 110 years in existence. Dolly Hand spoke at the naming ceremony, which was captured on video.

=== Dolly and Homer Hand Law Library ===
The Dolly and Homer Hand Law Library is situated on the Gulfport campus. When constructed in the late 1990s, the new library was built in the Mediterranean Revival design style to maintain consistency with the style of the buildings comprising the Gulfport campus, which were originally the Rolyat Hotel. The Dolly and Homer Hand Law Library contains a collection of approximately 400,000 volumes. The three-story building offers Internet access, 35 study rooms (ranging in size), and more than 600 seats at individual carrels, tables, and lounge areas.

The Dolly and Homer Hand Law Library contains physical archives including the Harold L. Sebring Collection, which include his personal papers and records as a medical case judge in the Nuremberg War Trials, and digital archives of the Florida Military Academy Collection and the Hotel Rolyat Collection.

=== Tampa Law Center Satellite Library ===
Situated near downtown Tampa, the satellite library has two floors consisting of approximately 200 seats and 15 study rooms.

== Costs ==
The estimated cost of attendance (including tuition, fees, and living expenses for nine months) for the 2024–2025 academic year is $79,166.

== Diversity and inclusion ==
Stetson Law received the 2020 Higher Education Excellence in Diversity (HEED) Award from INSIGHT Into Diversity magazine, the largest magazine centered on diversity in higher education. The HEED Award recognizes U.S. colleges and universities for outstanding commitment to diversity and inclusion.

As of 2020, Stetson Law and the 11 other Florida law schools formed the Florida Law Schools’ Consortium for Racial Justice (FLSCRJ). This collective will leverage each school's strengths and educational roles to assist community organizations fighting for racial justice and policy reform throughout Florida.

Stetson Law is one of the four co-founding higher education institutions of the St. Petersburg Higher Education Consortium for Racial Justice. The other three consortium institutions are Eckerd College, St. Petersburg College and the University of South Florida St. Petersburg. The consortium serves 36,000 students in St. Petersburg, Florida, and focuses on dismantling racial hierarchies. Recognized for their efforts, the consortium and 78 institutions nationwide were invited to the 2021 American Association of Colleges and Universities Institute on Truth, Racial Healing and Transformation (TRHT) to learn about the TRHT framework and develop an action plan.

In 2021, Stetson Law launched a youth civic education program aimed at teaching underrepresented teens in Pinellas County how to be advocates for themselves and others.

== Rankings and reputation ==
In 2025, Stetson University was ranked as 99th among law schools by U.S. News & World Report.

For 2023 graduates, 82.52% obtained full time, long term, Bar-passage-required employment (i.e. as attorneys) with most graduates employed by firms with 1—10 attorneys.

== Notable faculty ==
- Cary D. Landis (former faculty) – 25th Florida Attorney General, (1931–1938)
- Harold Sebring (deceased) – former chief justice of the Florida Supreme Court; a judge at the Nuremberg War Trials; Dean of Stetson Law (1955–1968)

== Notable alumni ==
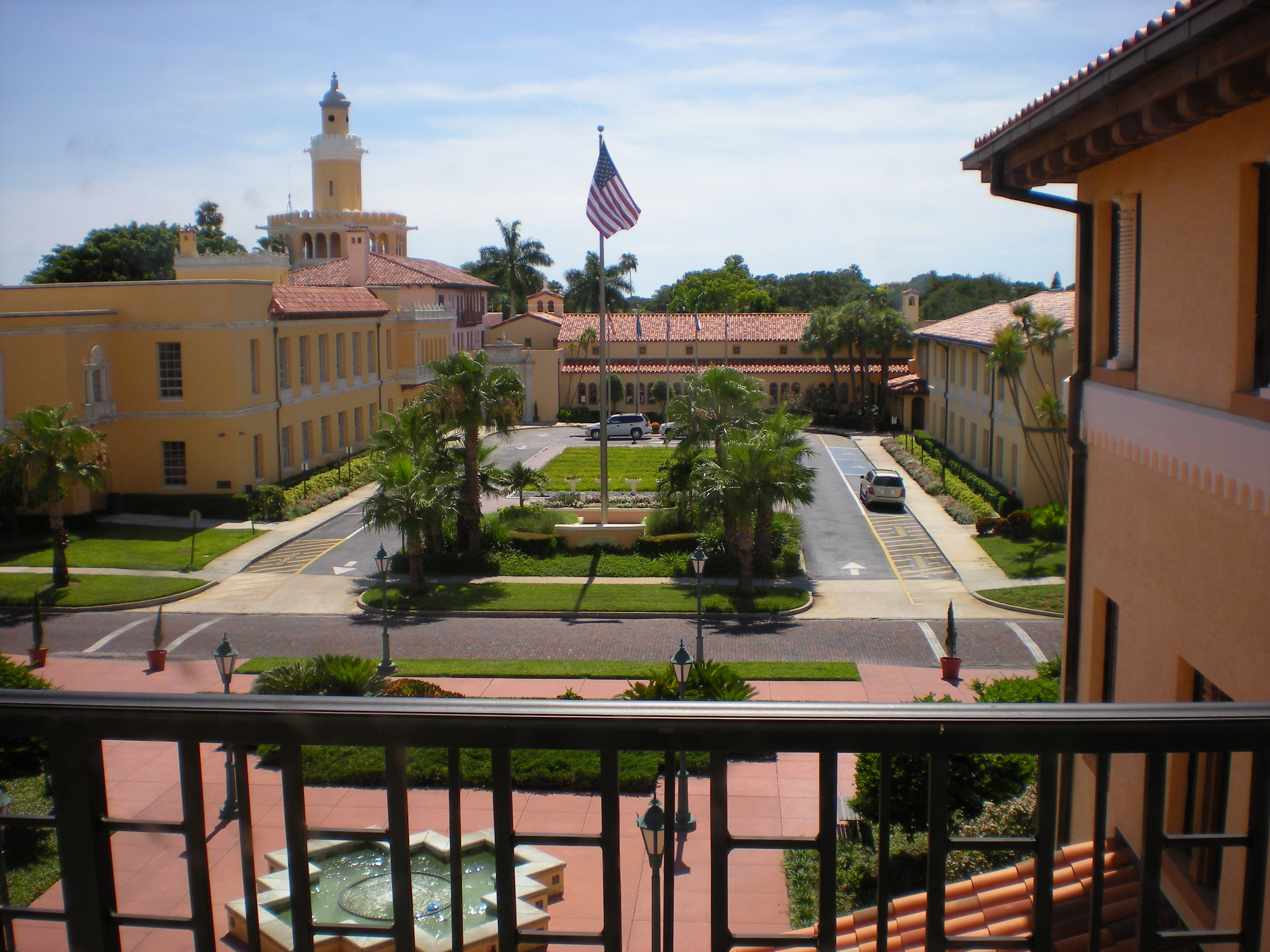
Stetson Law's campus from the library

Stetson Law's Crummer Courtyard from the coffee shop

- Gus Bilirakis (1989) – Florida House of Representatives (1998); United States House of Representatives (2006)
- Pam Bondi (1990) – United States Attorney General (2025–2026); Attorney General of Florida (2011–2019)
- John Cosgrove – Florida House of Representatives (1981–1984, 1986–2006)
- Edward Cowart (1952) – Dade County circuit court judge who presided over the Ted Bundy case
- Richard E. Doran (1981) – Attorney General of Florida (2002–2003)
- David W. Dyer (1933) – United States District Judge for the Southern District of Florida (1961–1966); Judge for the United States Court of Appeals for the Fifth Circuit (1966–1976); Judge for the United States Court of Appeals for the Eleventh Circuit (1976–1998)
- Bob Gualtieri (2002) - Sheriff of Pinellas County (2011–present)
- Joe Hendricks (1934) – United States House of Representatives (1937–1949)
- Bruce Jacob (1959) – Florida Assistant Attorney General during the early 1960s and argued the case for the state of Florida in the landmark case Gideon v. Wainwright
- Craig James (1967) – United States House of Representatives (1989–1993)
- Elizabeth A. Kovachevich (1961) – District Judge for the US District Court for the Middle District of Florida (1982–present)
- Carl M. Kuttler Jr. (1965) – President of St. Petersburg College, 1978–2009
- Kenneth Marra (1977) – Federal judge, United States District Court for the Southern District of Florida (2002–present)
- Rich McKay (1984) – President and general manager of the Atlanta Falcons (2004)
- Ashley Moody (LLM 2003) – Attorney General of Florida (2019–2025), United States Senator (2025–present)
- Clay Shaw (1966) – United States House of Representatives (1981–2007)
- David Sholtz (1914) – Governor of Florida (1933–1937)
- James C. Smith (1967) – Attorney General of Florida
- Chris Sprowls (2009) – Speaker of the Florida House of Representatives (2020–2022)
- Dean Trantalis (1979) – mayor of Ft. Lauderdale, Florida (2018–present)
- Vacharaesorn Vivacharawongse (2006) — former member of Thai Royal Family
- Emmett Wilson (1904) – United States House of Representatives (1913–1917)
