= Kiehnel and Elliott =

American architect

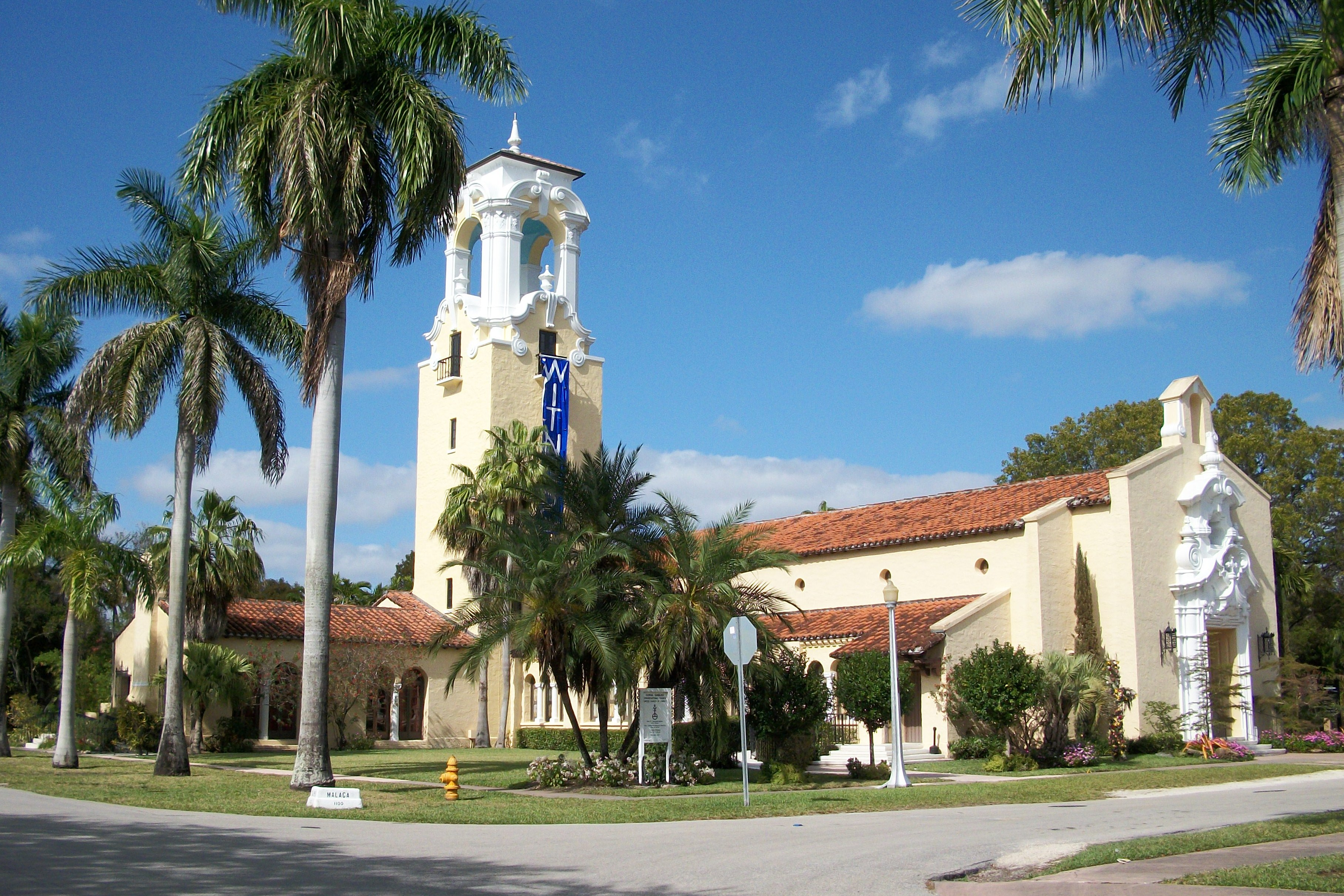
Coral Gables Congregational Church

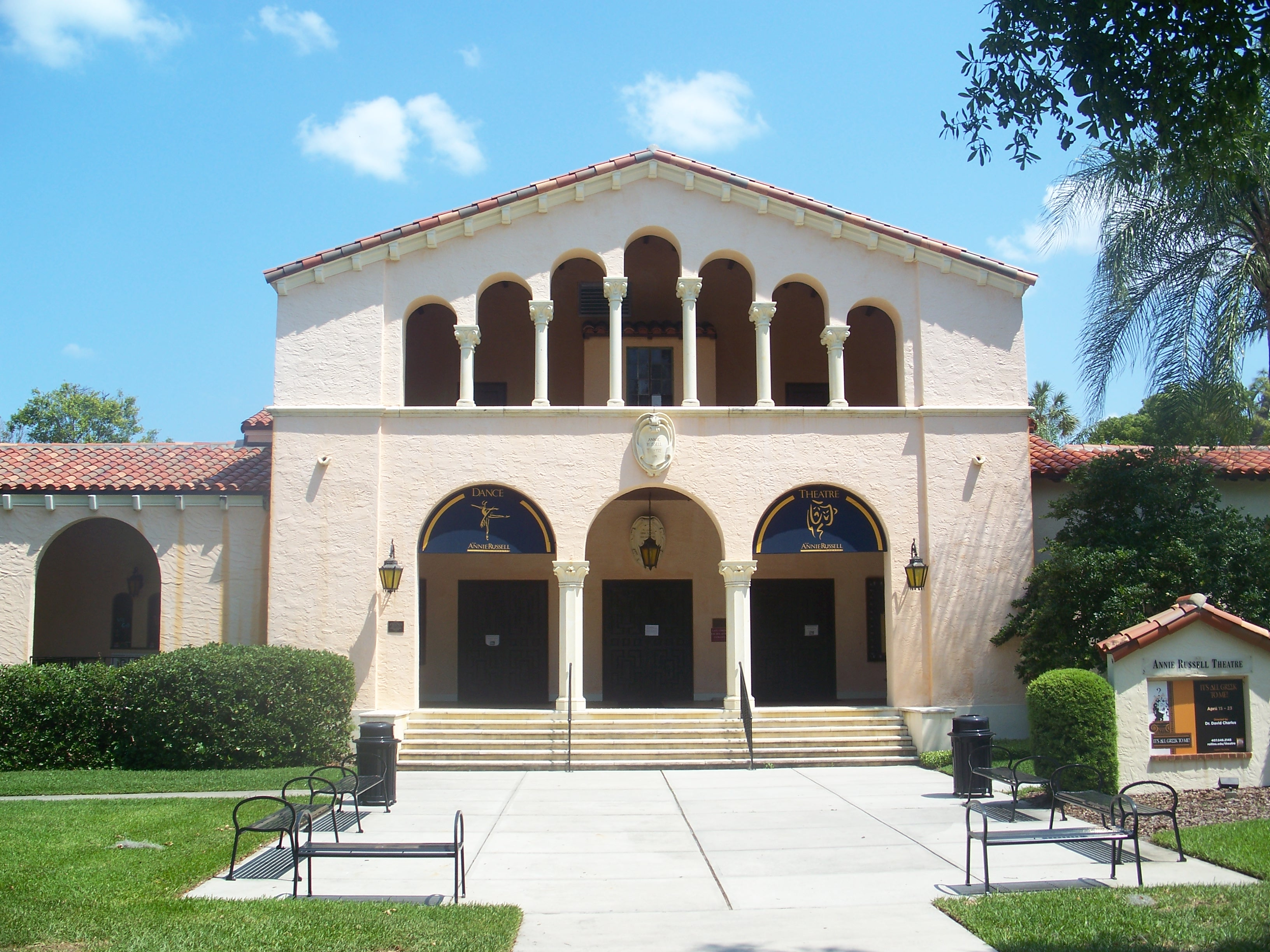
Annie Russell Theatre

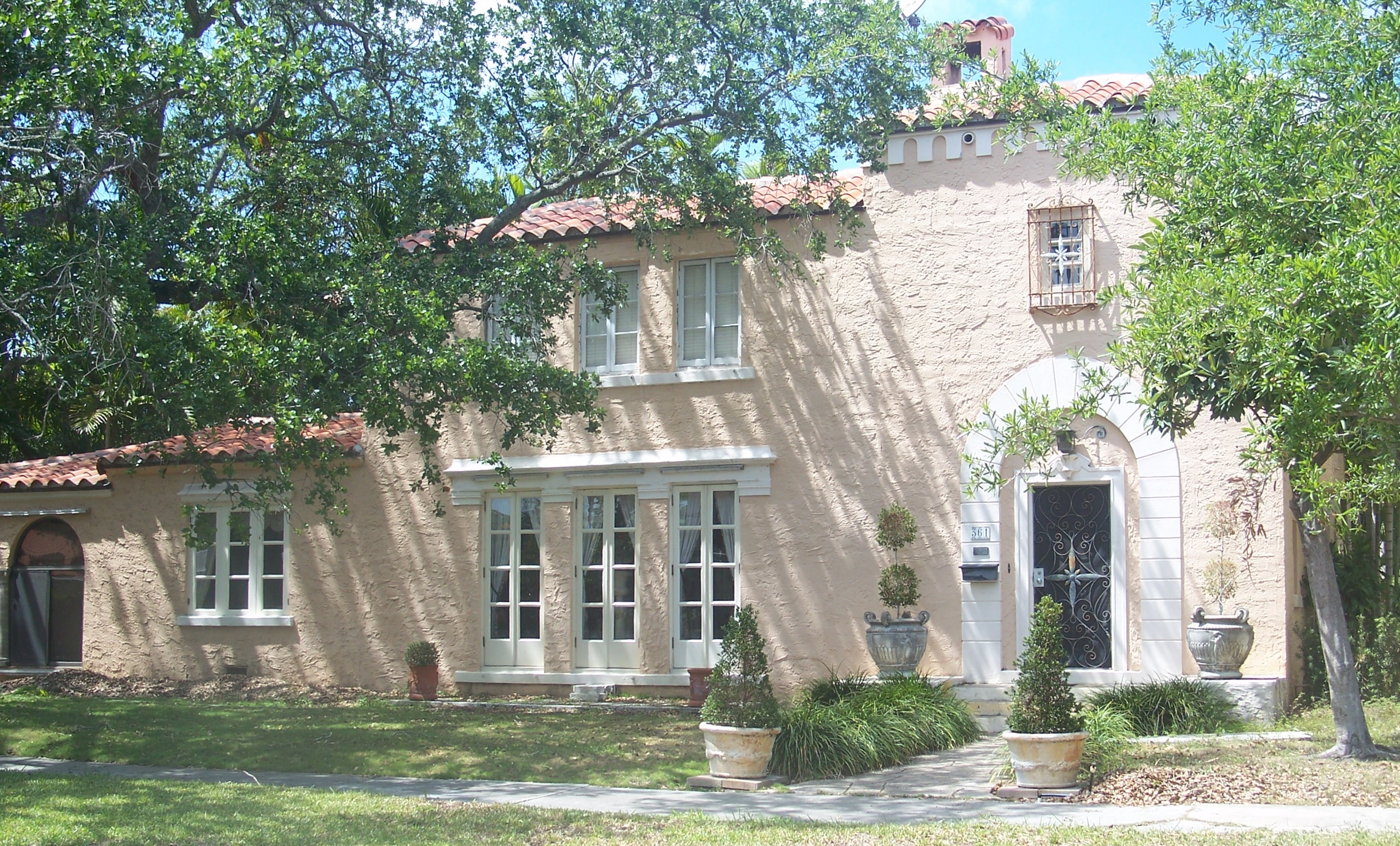
Building at 361 Northeast 97th Street, Miami Shores

The architectural firm of Kiehnel and Elliott was established in Pittsburgh, Pennsylvania, in 1906. The firm did substantial work in Florida, and moved to Miami in 1922. From 1926, it was known as Kiehnel, Elliott and Chalfant.

Richard Kiehnel (1870–1944) was the firm's senior partner. He was born in Germany and studied at the University of Breslau and the École nationale supérieure des Beaux-Arts in Paris. Kiehnel's first commission in the Miami area was in 1917 and he opened the firm's Miami office in 1922. He supervised the construction of El Jardin, the earliest known Mediterranean Revival work remaining in Miami. Designing the mansion for John Bindley, President of the Pittsburgh Steel Company, Kiehnel departed from the Mission style that had only recently made its appearance in Florida and provided an elaborate antiquity for the house by using aging techniques to get the desired effect. Kiehnel introduced Mediterranean Revival to Pinellas County through his designs of the Rolyat Hotel in Gulfport, Florida (now part of Stetson College of Law) and the Snell Arcade in St. Petersburg, Florida.

Kiehnel advanced to Art Moderne styling in the Carlyle Hotel on Miami Beach and the 1924 Scottish Rite Masonic Temple on the Miami River, the first Art Deco building in the area. He also designed the Annie Russell Theatre, a Romanesque Revival building on the campus of Rollins College in Winter Park.

Kiehnel was active in his profession. He was a member of the Pittsburgh chapter of the American Institute of Architects since 1906 and a member of the national body from 1913. He was a charter member of the Florida South chapter and its president in 1930-1931 From 1935 to 1942 Kiehnel was the editor of Florida Architecture and Allied Arts magazine.

A number of Kiehnel's and the firm's works are listed on the U.S. National Register of Historic Places.

== Notable buildings ==
By year (with attribution indicated in parentheses):

- Baxter High School, Baxter Street and Brushton Avenue, Pittsburgh, Pennsylvania, 1908, NRHP-listed (Kiehnel, Elliott & Chalfont)
- First National Bank of Pitcairn, Pitcairn, Pennsylvania, c. 1910
- Gardner Steel Conference Center, now part of the University of Pittsburgh in Pittsburgh, Pennsylvania, 1911-1912
- Old U.S. Post Office and Courthouse. 100-118 N.E. 1st Avenue. 1912-1914 Miami. (National Register of Historic Places) Converted to a bank in 1938. Also known as Amerifirst Federal. Now an Office Depot.
- Henius House (1917–18) 1315 Cordova Rd, Highland Park Pittsburgh, Pennsylvania
- El Jardin. (1918) Coconut Grove (at 3747 Main Hwy., Miami, Florida, NRHP-listed (Kiehnel, Richard).
- Cherokee Lodge 1917 Coconut Grove.
- Cherokee Lodge Carriage House 1917, Award Winning Restoration by Roland C Castro 2008 from Dade Heritage Trust
- Seybold Building and Arcade 1921-1925 Miami.
- Greenfield Elementary School, (1922) N of Greenfield Ave. at E end of Alger St., Pittsburgh, PA, NRHP-listed (Kiehnel & Elliott)
- Scottish Rite Masonic Temple (Miami) 1922 Miami.
- La Solana, 3670 Hibiscus Street, Coconut Grove, Florida (1922), built as Soden residence
- Coral Gables Congregational Church (1923), 3010 DeSoto Blvd., Coral Gables, Florida, NRHP-listed (Kiehnel & Elliott)
- Coral Gables Elementary School. (1923-1926) 105 Minorca Avenue, Coral Gables, Florida, NRHP-listed (Kiehnel, Richard)
- Rolyat Hotel, Gulfport, Florida (1925), now part of the Stetson University College of Law
- La Brisa (Coconut Grove, Florida) 1926-1928. Coconut Grove. 3551 Main Highway. This house was built on land originally owned by the noted author, Kirk Munroe.
- John B. Orr residence (1926) on Palm Island, Miami Beach
- Snell Arcade 1926) 405 Central Avenue, St. Petersburg, Florida, NRHP-listed (Kiehnel, Richard)
- Miami Senior High School. (1927) 2450 SW First Street, Miami, Florida, NRHP-listed (Kiehnel & Elliott)
- Player's State Theatre. 1927 Coconut Grove.
- Bryan Memorial Methodist Church 1928 Main Highway, Coconut Grove
- Annie Russell Theatre. 1931 1000 Holt Avenue in Winter Park, Florida NRHP-listed (Kiehnel, Richard)
- Mr. and Mrs. E. B. Douglas residence. Miami.
- Second Church of Christ Scientist. 1940 Coconut Grove. 3850 Main Highway.
- Carlyle Hotel 1941 Miami Beach.

And (not by year):

- Building at 10108 Northeast 1st Avenue, 10108 NE. 1st Ave. Miami Shores, FL (Kiehnel & Elliott), NRHP-listed
- Building at 107 Northeast 96th Street, 107 NE. 96th St. Miami Shores, FL (Kiehnel & Elliott), NRHP-listed
- Building at 121 Northeast 100th Street, 121 NE. 100th St. Miami Shores, FL (Kiehnel & Elliott), NRHP-listed
- Building at 145 Northeast 95th Street, 145 NE. 95th St. Miami Shores, FL (Kiehnel & Elliott), NRHP-listed
- Building at 257 Northeast 91st Street, 257 NE. 91st St. Miami Shores, FL (Kiehnel & Elliott), NRHP-listed
- Building at 262 Northeast 96th Street, 262 NE. 96th St. Miami Shores, FL (Kiehnel & Elliott), NRHP-listed
- Building at 273 Northeast 98th Street, 273 NE. 98th St. Miami Shores, FL (Kiehnel & Elliott), NRHP-listed
- Building at 276 Northeast 98th Street, 276 NE. 98th St. Miami Shores, FL (Kiehnel & Elliott), NRHP-listed
- Building at 310 Northeast 99th Street, 310 NE. 99th St. Miami Shores, FL (Kiehnel & Elliott), NRHP-listed
- Building at 361 Northeast 97th Street, 361 NE. 97th St. Miami Shores, FL (Kiehnel & Elliott), NRHP-listed
- Building at 384 Northeast 94th Street, 384 NE. 94th St. Miami Shores, FL (Kiehnel & Elliott), NRHP-listed
- Building at 431 Northeast 94th Street, 431 NE. 94th St. Miami Shores, FL (Kiehnel & Elliott), NRHP-listed
- Bartholomew J. Donnelly House, 801 N. Peninsula Dr. Daytona Beach, FL (Kiehnel, Richard), NRHP-listed
- One or more works in Bay Shore Historic District, Roughly bounded by NE. 55th St., Biscayne Blvd., NE. 60th Street and Biscayne Bay Miami, Florida (Kiehnel & Elliott), NRHP-listed
- Building at 2400 Prairie Ave Miami Beach, FL

== See also ==
Category:Kiehnel and Elliott buildings
