= Snell Arcade =

- U.S. National Register of Historic Places
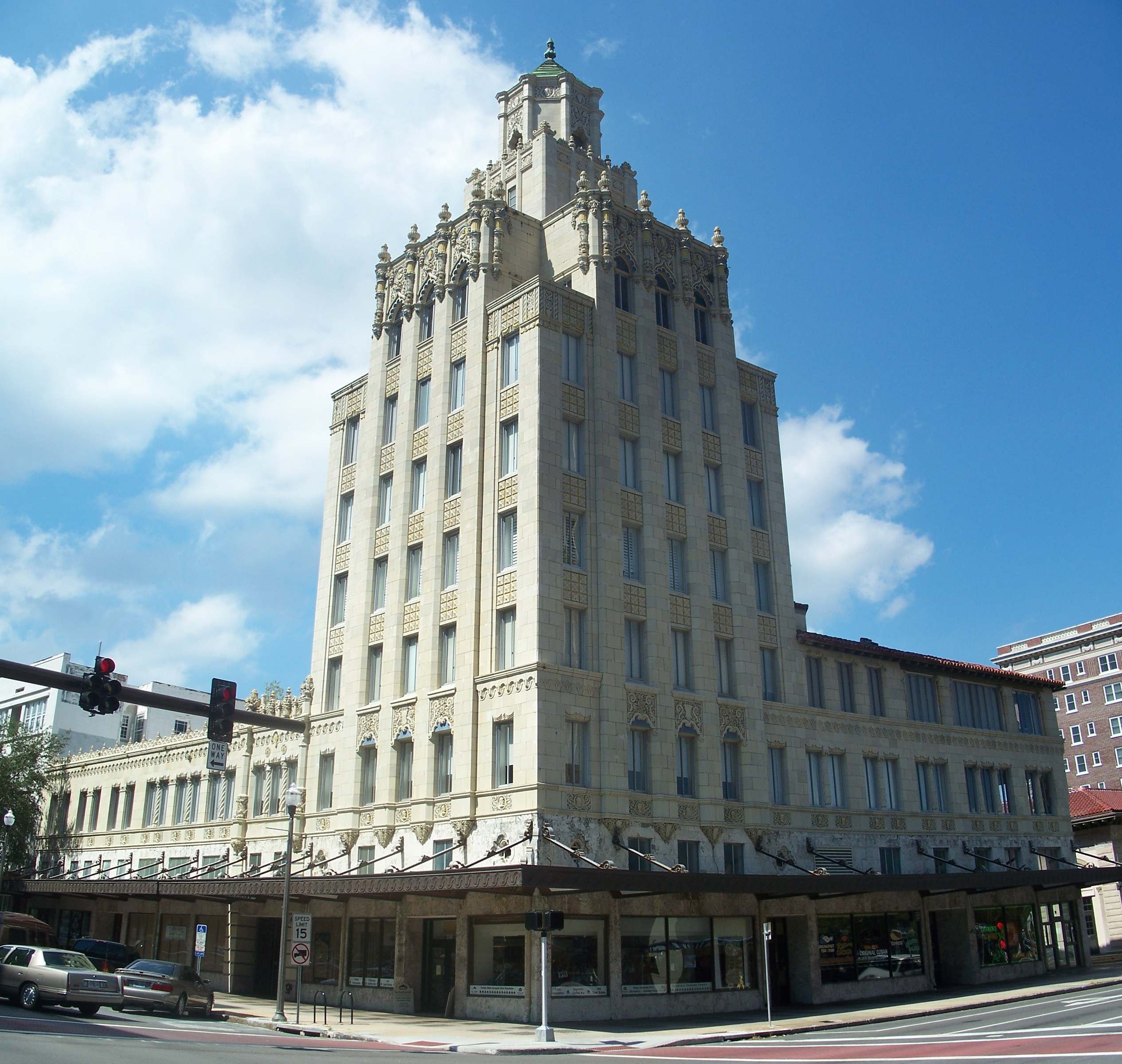

- Location within Florida Location within the United States
- Location: St. Petersburg, Florida
- Coordinates: 27°46′16.75″N 82°38′19.25″W
- NRHP reference No.: 82001037
- Added to NRHP: November 4, 1982

The Snell Arcade (also known as the Rutland Building) is a historic site in St. Petersburg, Florida. The building was designed by the architect Richard Kiehnel of Kiehnel and Elliott. Built in 1928, it is located at 405 Central Avenue. On November 4, 1982, it was added to the U.S. National Register of Historic Places. The Snell Arcade was developed by C. Perry Snell, a wealthy landowner and philanthropist.
