= K–8 school =

Type of school in the United States

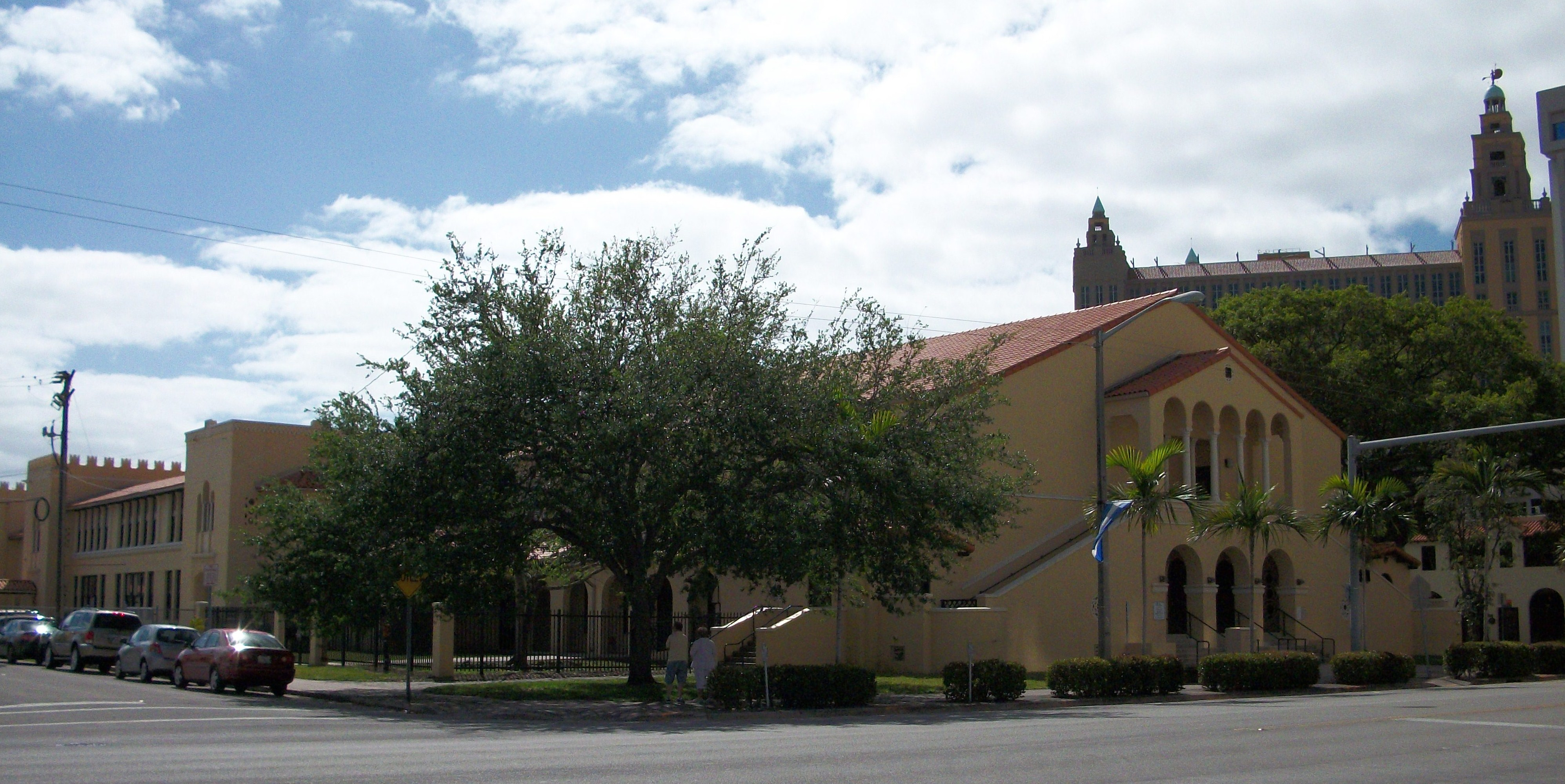
The "lower academy" (elementary school) of the Coral Gables Preparatory Academy in Coral Gables, Florida

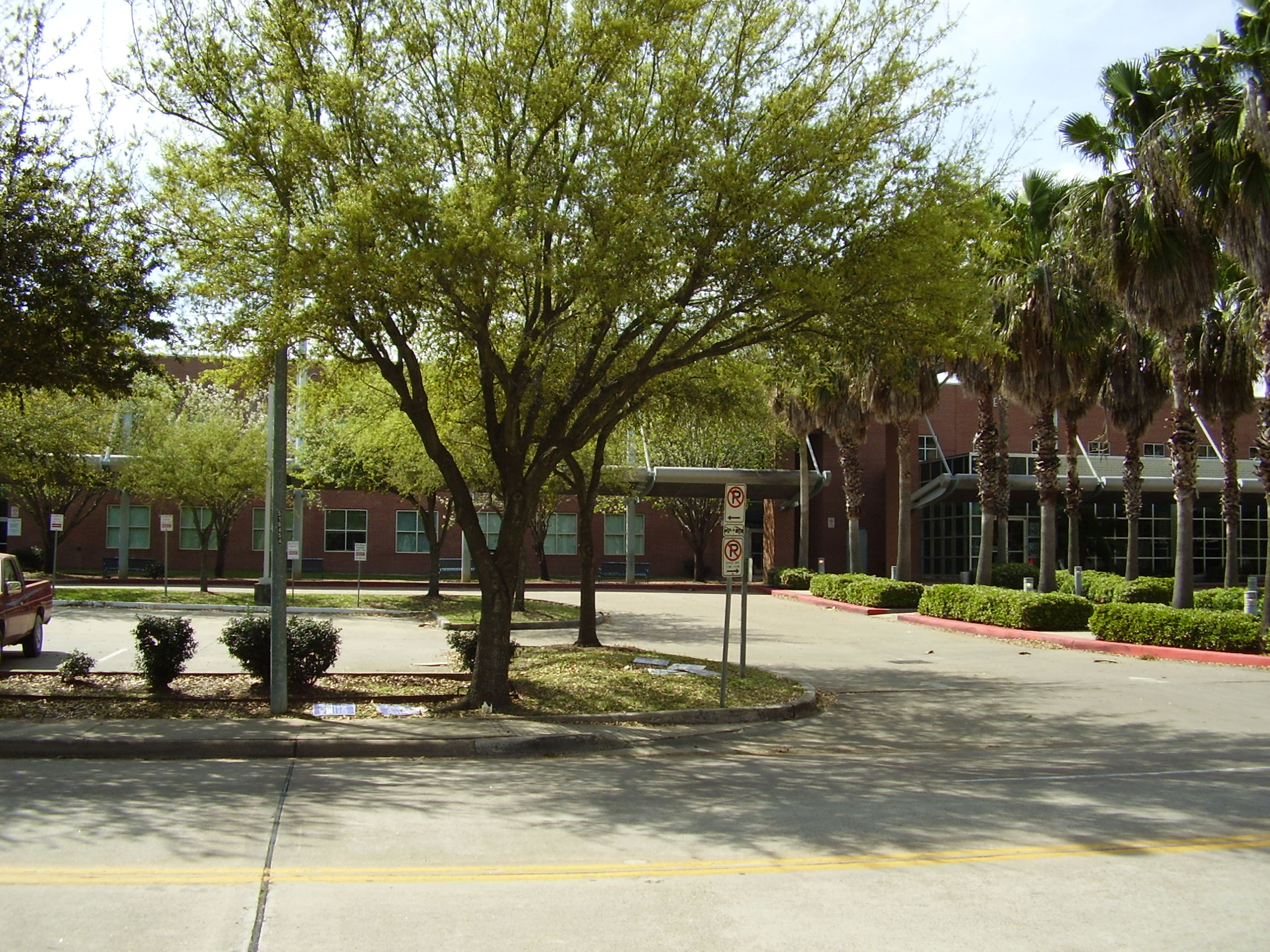
The Rice School, Houston, Texas

K–8 schools, elementary-middle schools, or K–8 centers are schools in the United States that enroll students from kindergarten/pre-K (age 5–6) to 8th grade (up to age 14), combining the typical elementary school (K–5/6) and junior high or middle school (6/7–8).

As of 2007, many American private schools have K–8 configurations.

== History ==
In the late 19th century and early 20th century most American elementary schools had grades 1 through 8. The "junior high school" concept was introduced in 1909. As time passed, until the 1940s, junior high schools increased quickly. The installation of junior high schools was made in order to provide more academic and social opportunities for adolescent students prior to entering high school. By the 1960s many U.S. school districts separated the elementary and junior high school levels, with seventh through ninth grade students at junior high school. As years passed, the model changed to middle schools serving grades six through eight.

By 2007, in some communities, schools in areas where academic performance at the middle school level was low were converting back to the K–8 model in an attempt to increase academic performance. By 2008, many urban school systems converted middle schools to K–8 schools. Districts moving to K–8 schools included the Baltimore City Public School System, Cincinnati Public Schools, and the School District of Philadelphia. District of Columbia Public Schools, by then, had also converted some schools to K–8. Jennifer Radcliffe of the Houston Chronicle said that teachers said that the scenario that "students aren't tripped up during the disruptive year that they transition to middle school" was "[o]ne of the biggest perks" of the conversion to K–8 schools. Radcliffe said that experts told her that "By staying on the same campus, kids can focus on academics, rather than being forced to re-establish themselves socially. Teachers are able to establish solid relationships with families. As a result, parents are more apt to stay involved with the campus through the middle school years". Radcliffe added that compared to traditional middle schools, a K–8 has a reduced capacity in offering athletics and elective classes.

== See also ==
- Elementary and junior high school combined education (for the equivalent in Japan)
