= Gardner Steel Conference Center =

- U.S. Historic district – Contributing property
- Pittsburgh Landmark – PHLF
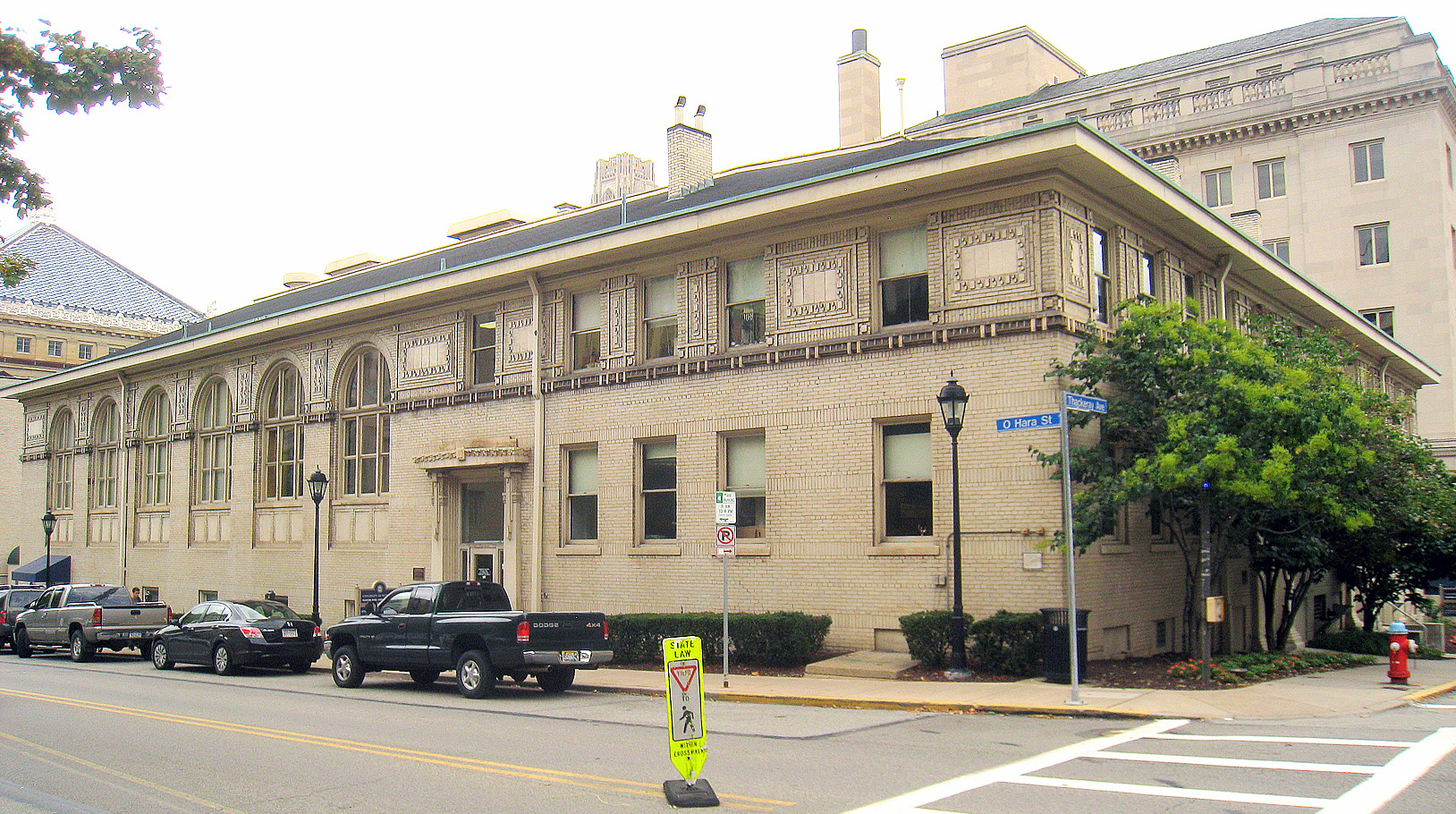
- Gardner Steel Conference Center at the University of Pittsburgh
- Coordinates: 40°26′40.20″N 79°57′27.91″W
- Built: 1911-1912
- Architect: Kiehnel & Elliott
- Architectural style: Early Modern
- Part of: Schenley Farms Historic District (ID83002213)

Significant dates
- Added to NRHP: July 22, 1983
- Designated PHLF: 2007

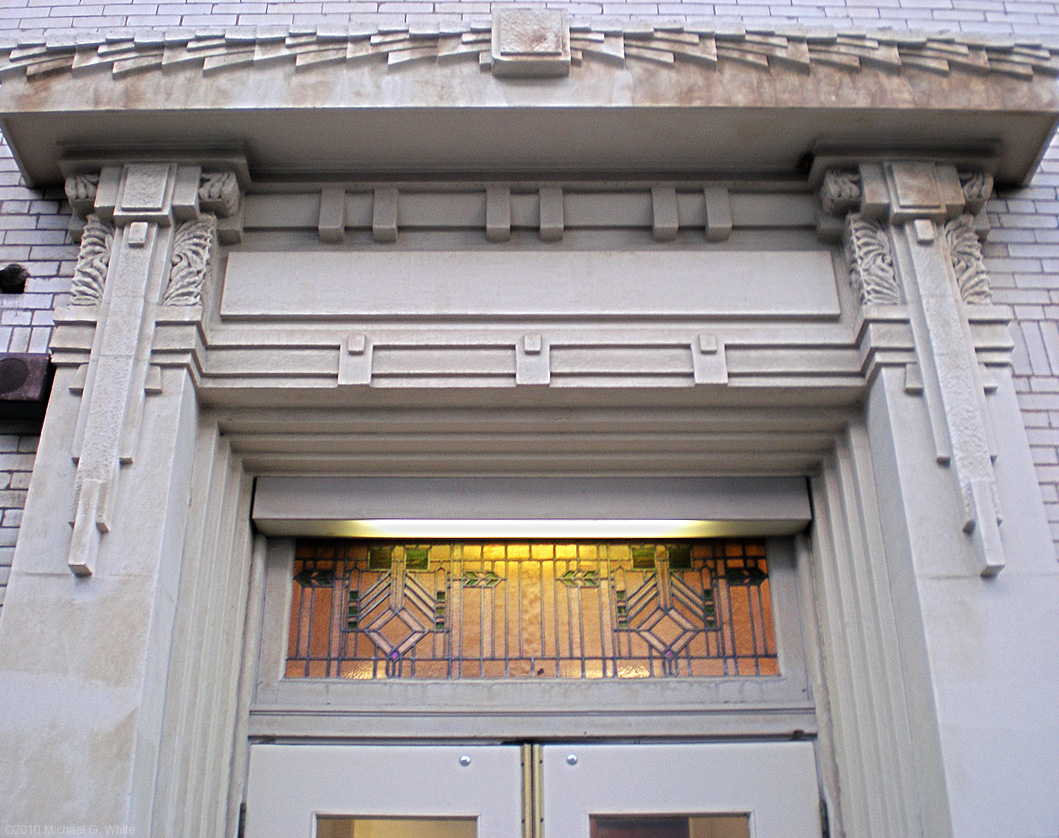
The transom of the Thackeray Avenue entrance

Gardner Steel Conference Center (GSCC) is an academic building of the University of Pittsburgh and a contributing property to the Schenley Farms National Historic District and a Pittsburgh History and Landmarks Foundation Historic Landmark.

An Early Modern structure built from 1911-1912 by architects Kiehnel and Elliott, has been noted for its capital ornamentation over the entrance doors, and the wave-like shapes repeated across the cornice which likely derive from the German art nouveau movement jugendstil. The building originally served as the Central Turnverein, a German-American social and athletic association, and later known as the Central Athletic Association. It served as the site of various athletic contests, including some involving the University of Pittsburgh. During World War I, it was used to house those in the Student Army Training Corps. Following the war, a severe space shortage at the Dental School prompted the university to purchase the building in 1920 for use as a dental clinic and infirmary. Known then as the Infirmary Building, a 2,500-square-foot (230 m^{2}) annex was erected in 1922 creating enough space in the building to hold 200 dental chairs.

The Gardner Steel Conference Center, as it is now known, is currently home to classrooms, computer labs, the Academic Resource Center, and the Innovation Institute. In 1995, the School of Engineering and the Department of Mathematics collaborated on a $250,000 joint project that created a 2,300-square-foot (210 m^{2}) laboratory for the computer instruction of calculus. The Gardner Steel Conference Center is the former home to the Pitt Club, a University of Pittsburgh faculty and staff club defunct since 2003. Previously, it also served for a time as home of the General Alumni Association (now the Pitt Alumni Association based in Alumni Hall).

The Gardner Steel Conference Center is named after Gardner Steele, a Pitt alumnus and investor in the oil fields of Oklahoma. He matriculated in 1891 and was a member of one of the first intervarsity football teams and also held the record for the 100-yard (91 m) dash while at Pitt. When he died in 1928, he left the bulk of a $300,000 estate to the university.

Preceded by Allegheny Observatory	University of Pittsburgh buildings Gardner Steel Conference Center; Constructed: 1911-1912	Succeeded by O'Hara Student Center
