= Sherry Glaser =

American actress

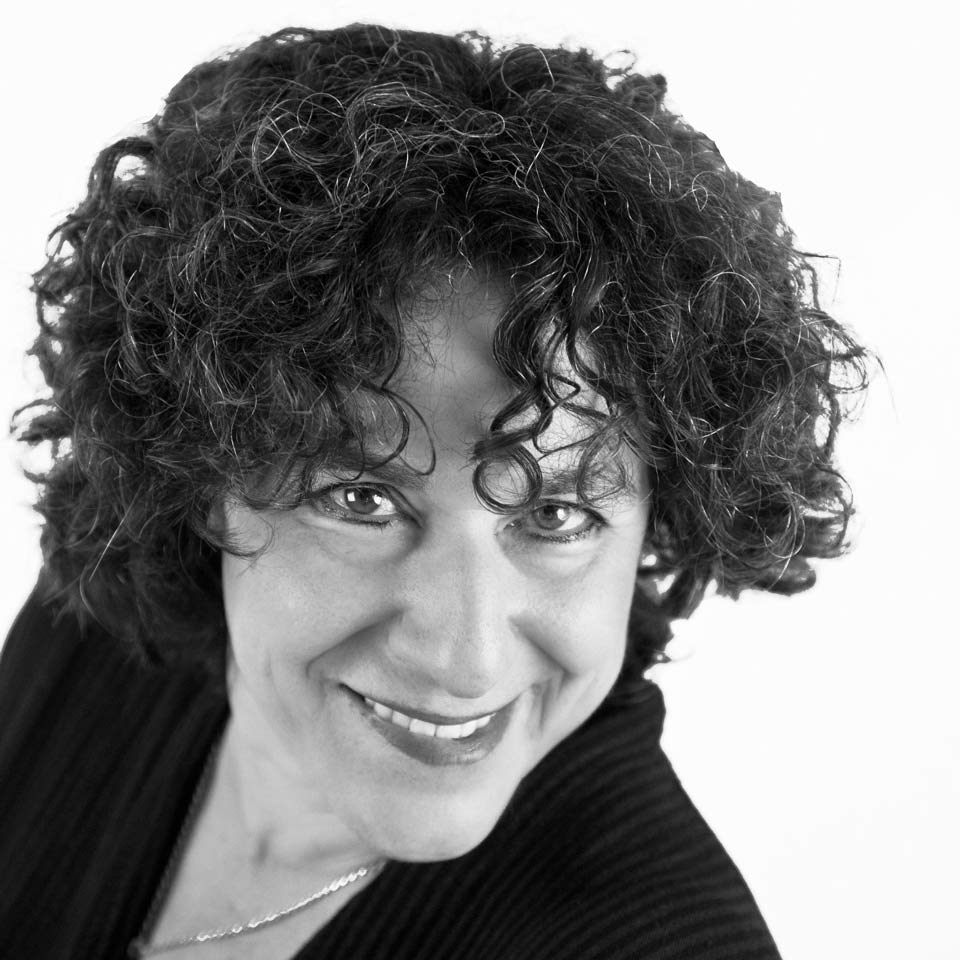
- Glaser in 2011
- Born: June 7, 1960 (age 66); New York City, U.S.
- Education: San Diego State University
- Occupations: Actress, activist
- Spouse: Greg Howells (disappeared 1997)
- Children: 2
- Website: www.sherryglaser.net

Sherry Glaser (born June 7, 1960) is an American actress, noted for her performance in the off-Broadway solo show Family Secrets about a Jewish family in California.

Glaser is also a political activist, who was arrested for her topless protest against the “immoral injustices of war” (Breasts Not Bombs), and for opening a Medical Marijuana Dispensary. In both cases, charges were dropped.

== Early life ==
Sherry Glaser was born in New York and raised on Long Island. Glaser moved to San Diego in 1978 and attended San Diego State University. She developed her improvisational comedy skills with the feminist comedy group Hot Flashes. She then moved on to solo performance work, aided by the direction and co-writing of her then-husband Greg Howells. Glaser's inspiration for solo performance came while practicing improvisation in the early 1980s in San Diego in the company of Whoopi Goldberg, Mo Gaffney and Kathy Najimy.

== Career ==
Glaser is best known for her long-running off-Broadway solo performance piece Family Secrets and her autobiography, Family Secrets: One Woman's Look at a Relatively Painful Subject, published by Simon & Schuster in 1997. In the play, Glaser portrays five different members of a Jewish family who migrated from New York to California in the 1980s. Glaser won numerous awards for her role in Family Secrets. The show was presented off-Broadway twice, from 1993 to 1995 and again in 2006.

Glaser then played Ma and Miguel in her one-woman play, Oh My Goddess! Ma was depicted as the Great Jewish Mother of us all, "reminding us of the simple and sacred nature of life on earth". In 2004, Glaser collaborated with Thais Mazur on a theater/dance project called Remember This (An Intimate Portrait of War through the Eyes of Women) which debuted in Mendocino and then went on to San Francisco. Glaser wrote another one-woman show called Taking the High Road (Comic Confessions from Behind the Cannabis Curtain) in 2015 after her Medical Marijuana Dispensary and her home were raided by local and Federal agents. Glaser also co-authored a book with her mother, Rochelle (Shelly) Glaser about their experiences with mental illness, titled The First Practical Handbook for Crazy People.

Glaser also writes a weekly Tuesday evening editorial on Mendocino County, California, radio station KZYX. Glaser's writing has been featured in the anthologies, Exit Laughing, The Other Woman, He Said What? (Victoria Zackheim, editor), and Warrior Mothers (Thais Mazur, editor).

== Family life ==
Sherry Glaser met her future husband, Greg Howells, through her comedy career. At the time Howells was a friend of a friend of Glaser's next-door neighbor. Glaser and Howells' shared passion for comedy brought them together. Glaser and Howells had two daughters, Dana and Lucy. Glaser commented that "I had always wanted two (so they could have someone to talk to about their crazy mother)". Greg Howells disappeared on June 18, 1997. He was last seen golfing at the Rancho Cañada Golf Course in Carmel Valley, California.

== Political activism ==
=== Breasts Not Bombs ===
Breasts Not Bombs is a grassroots political movement based in Mendocino County, California. The group focuses on the intersection between top-free equality and social justice through non-violent public protests involving street theatre and toplessness in order to bring attention to what they term the "immoral injustices of war.

On November 8, 2005, Sherry Glaser and Renee Love, members of Breasts Not Bombs, went topless on the steps of the California State Capital to protest the policies of California Governor Arnold Schwarzenegger. They were arrested on suspicion of indecent exposure, disorderly conduct and violation of the terms of their protest permit. If convicted, the women would have been required to register as sex offenders. In the court battle that followed their arrest, they argued that women should have the same right to go topless as men. In November 2008, the courts awarded the women $150,000. The court also required that California Highway Patrol officers assigned to the Capitol Protection Section be provided training in First Amendment rights of protesters.

She comments on her website, "Their bare breasts were called 'indecent', so I thought, let's use this incident and our equal protection under the 14th Amendment to show what real freedom and decency look like. She realizes, words alone can be easily disregarded, but bodies are harder to ignore."

On her website, Glaser has written that "It's ironic that Arnold Schwarzenegger can grope and molest women's bodies and become Governor yet we stand in power exercising our first amendment rights and we get arrested. I Protest!" Glaser began a political movement claiming breasts are not indecent, wars are. Glaser and others have been protesting topless in order to give public awareness to the deaths which occurred in the Iraq War. Glaser has her own website where she discusses her political actions and upcoming productions as well as making her weekly radio commentaries publicly available.

=== Other activism ===
She was instrumental in a recent tsunami relief benefit which raised over $10,000 USD, she has done benefits for women's shelters, environmental agencies, and the homeless, and she has taught workshops in radical emotional transformation and Organic Improvisational Theater. Glaser opened the first Medical Marijuana Dispensary in the Village of Mendocino California in February 2011. It was called Love in It and dispensed organic, local cannabis to over 3000 patients. Her dispensary was raided on March 4, 2014. She went to jail along with all the employees and bailed out the next day. She filed forms to reclaim her property and medicine and fought the D.A. David Eyster all the way. Love in It reopened on April 1, 2014, and all charges against Glaser were finally dropped in 2017.
