= Coral Gables Congregational Church =

Historic church in Florida, United States

- U.S. National Register of Historic Places
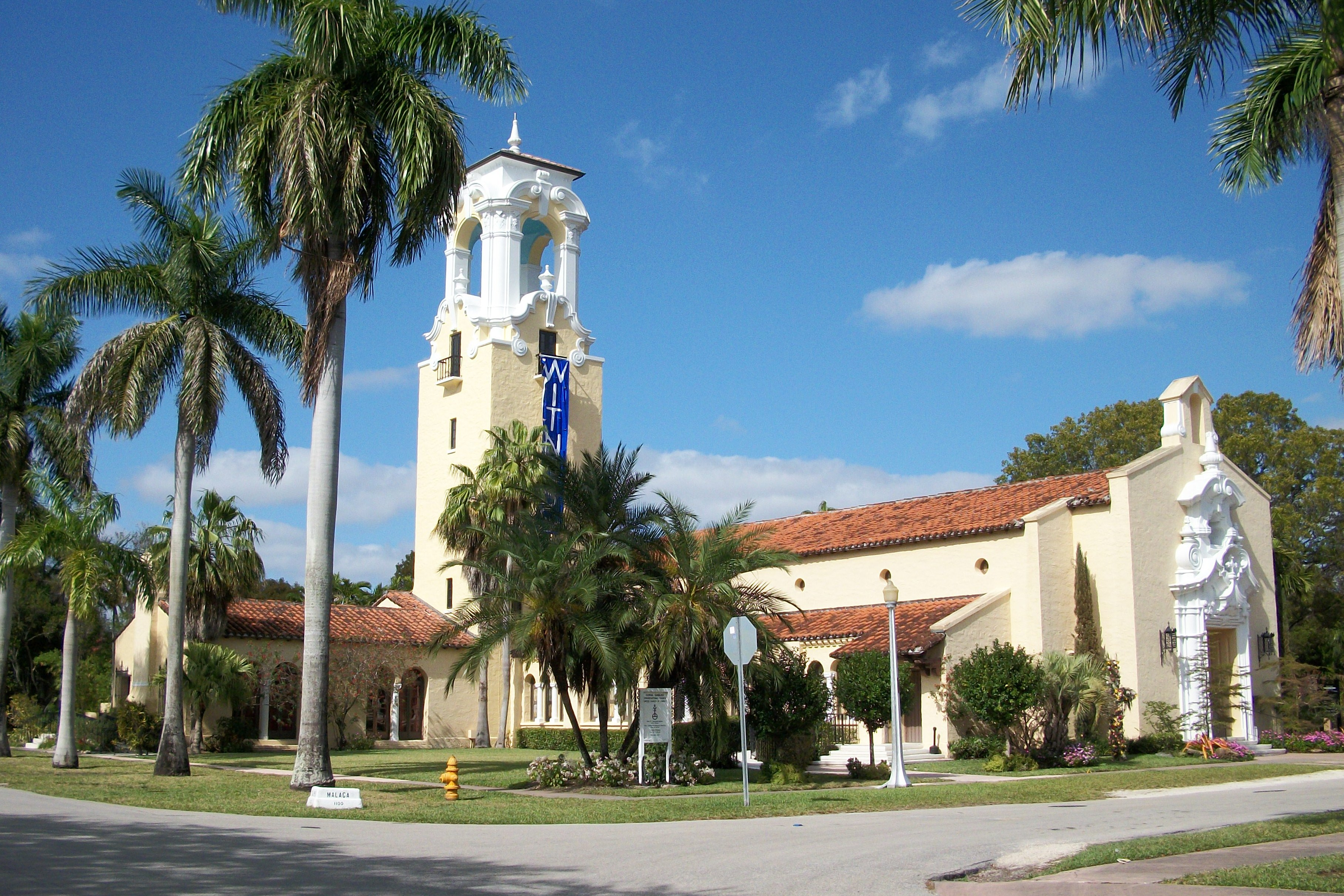
- Coral Gables Congretational Church in Coral Gables, Florida, April 2010

- Location within Miami Location within Florida Location within the United States
- Location: Coral Gables, Florida
- Coordinates: 25°44′33″N 80°16′44″W
- NRHP reference No.: 78000937
- Added to NRHP: October 10, 1978

The Coral Gables Congregational Church is a historic Congregational church in Coral Gables, Florida, United States. The church was designed by the architect Richard Kiehnel of Kiehnel and Elliott in 1923 and is regarded as a fine example of Spanish Colonial Revival architecture. It is located at 3010 DeSoto Boulevard. On October 10, 1978, it was added to the U.S. National Register of Historic Places.

It has been known to encourage artistic and musical pursuits for youths. In particular the Coral Gables Congregational Church Composition Prize which, in 2006, was won by Australian composer Gordon Hamilton.

== History ==
The land for the church was donated by George E. Merrick, the developer who planned and built Coral Gables. Merrick dedicated it to his father, a Congregational minister.

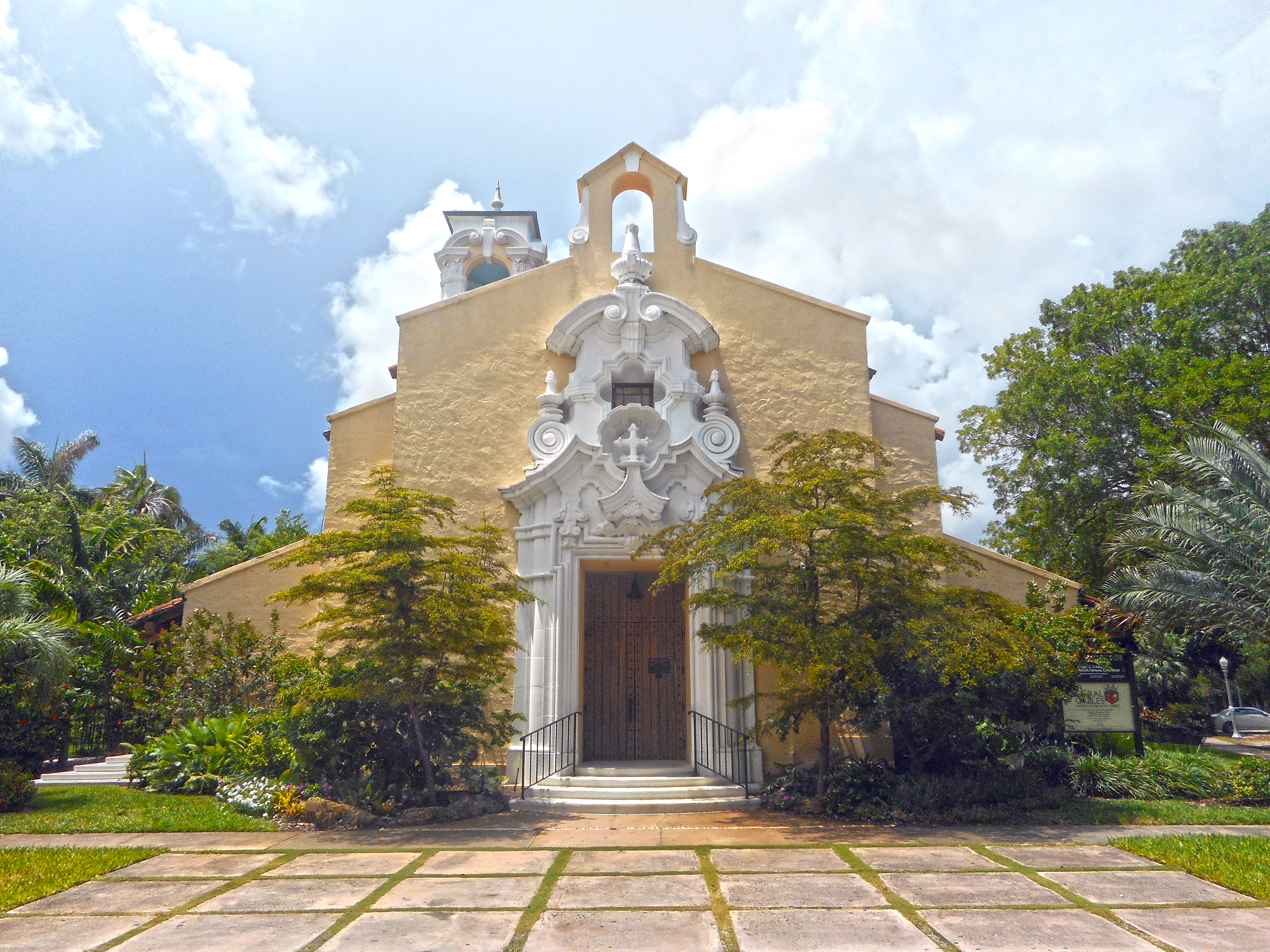

== See also ==
- Church of the Little Flower (Coral Gables, Florida)
