= National Clearinghouse for Science, Technology and the Law =

The National Clearinghouse for Science, Technology and the Law at Stetson University College of Law is an organization that provides information sharing and professional development to forensic scientists, lawyers, judges, other legal professionals, law enforcement personnel, educators, and the general public. Sponsored by a grant from the National Institute of Justice, NCSTL offers educational programs and a database of forensic-related information. Within the context of the promotion of justice based on sound science and technology, NCSTL focuses on raising awareness and fostering communication and understanding among the various parties interested in scientific evidence and expert testimony.

== Free Forensics Database ==
One of the primary purposes of NCSTL is to provide a resource that collects and tracks the latest available sources related to forensics and technology. NCSTL scrutinizes and disseminates useful information in the form of a research database on the Internet that is free and available to the public.

The NCSTL database was first offered live to the public in February 2005. It collects and distributes bibliographic information on thousands of court decisions, pieces of legislation, legal and scientific publications, news and media features, websites and educational opportunities. Using the database, researchers can choose to view all types of resources in all its forensic-related topics, or restrict to those topics or resource types of specific interest. Individual records provide bibliographic information, as well as active URLs that link to full text whenever available. Researchers can also take advantage of a feature that offers the ability to save favorite searches. Materials found in the database are supported in hard copy in the NCSTL collection in Stetson Law Library.

== Educational Resources ==
In its continuing education efforts, NCSTL tries to raise awareness of the nature of good evidence practices. NCSTL presents an annual lecture series on the Stetson Law School campus that has included presentations by noted forensic scientists such as Drs. Michael Baden and Henry Lee about a wide variety of forensic topics, including forensic investigations. Thus, through its continuing education efforts, NCSTL shares with the forensic science community and the public what good forensic science practices are. NCSTL’s lecture series is not only free and open to the public, but is webcast and podcast live, as well as available archivally from the NCSTL website. NCSTL is also developing continuing education programs for forensic scientists and attorneys.

NCSTL also offers educational opportunities to students. As a program at Stetson University College of Law, students can earn academic or pro bono credit by helping build the NCSTL database. In addition, students at other universities are welcome to volunteer, and may be able to arrange earning credit at their own educational institutions.
