= Alfred Browning Parker =

American architect

- Born: September 24, 1916; Boston, Massachusetts
- Died: March 11, 2011 (aged 94); Gainesville, Florida
- Education: University of Florida
- Occupation: Architect
- Spouse: Euphrosyne
- Children: Derek (son); Bo (son); Robin (son); Gifford or Bebe (daughter); Quentin (son); Lebritia (daughter)

Alfred Browning Parker, FAIA (September 24, 1916 – March 11, 2011) was a Modernist architect who is one of the best-known post World War II residential architects. He gained fame for his highly published modern houses in the region around Miami, Florida. He was born in Boston, MA and moved to Miami when he was eight years old. Parker graduated from the University of Florida in 1939 with a degree in Architecture. Influenced by Frank Lloyd Wright but with regional touches, Parker's designs have been published in many magazines such as House Beautiful, as well as in companion books.

Parker began his practice in Miami in 1946. He experimented with lower cost housing, included the "Tropex-pansible Home", which was constructed with high quality but modular parts.

Alfred Browning Parker designed well over 500 projects in his 60-year career. Most notable were his own homes, especially the homes he designed for himself on Royal Road and in Gables Estates (both recognized as Pace Setters by House Beautiful magazine), as well as the home he called Woodsong, his mother's Jewel in the Treetop home, and the demolished Alliance Machine Company building (all in Coconut Grove), plus the Hope Lutheran Church on Bird Road, the General Capital Corporation building on NW 54th Street, Miamarina ("remuddled" into a Hard Rock Café on the Bay) and Temple Beth El in West Palm Beach.

Other works include the renovation of the Coconut Grove Playhouse (1954).

In 1952 he designed the George Washington Carver Middle School. Parker also served as a professor emeritus at the University of Florida School of Architecture.

The University of Florida is the repository of the architectural papers and drawings of Parker. In 2008 the University of Florida announced the creation of the Alfred Browning Parker Architecture Archives Endowment to support and strengthen this effort to preserve the architectural history of Florida.

== Notable commissions ==
- Bal Harbour Yacht Club. 1953. Miami Beach.
- Residence. Owner: Mr. and Mrs. Graham Miller. Coconut Grove, FL. 1959 House Beautiful Pacesetter
- Residence. Owner: Mr. Ewing. Coconut Grove, FL.
- Residence. Owner: Mr. and Mrs. Samuel Marco. Coconut Grove, FL.
- Residence. Owner: Mr. and Mrs. Richard Titelman. Miami, FL.
- Residence. Owner: Mr. and Mrs. Clifford J. Rice. Miami, FL.
- Residence. Owner: Mr. and Mrs. Joseph Mass. Palm Beach, FL.
- Residence. Owner: Bert Friedman. 1957 Coconut Grove, FL.
- Residence. Owner: Alfred Browning Parker. Coconut Grove, FL. 1954 House Beautiful Pacesetter.
- Flagler Federal Savings & Loan Association of Miami. 1961. Miami.
- Alliance Machine Company. 1952. Coconut Grove.
- George Washington Carver High School. Coral Gables.
- Residence. Owner: Mr. and Mrs. Barillet Clement. South Miami, FL

== Recommended reading ==
Parker, Alfred Browning (1965). You and Architecture. New York: Delacorte Press. OCLC 1190482.

Henning, Randolph C. (2011). The Architecture of Alfred Browning Parker, Miami's Maverick Modernist. Gainesville, FL: University Press of Florida. ISBN 978-0-8130-3677-9. OCLC 707260796. Publisher's page.

Shulman, Allan (2017). The Discipline of Nature: Architect Alfred Browning Parker in Florida. Miami, FL: HistoryMiami Museum; co-author Randolph C. Henning. ISBN 978-0-9896815-9-9.

Penick, Monica (2017). Tastemaker: Elizabeth Gordon, House Beautiful, and the Postwar American Home. New Haven, CN: Yale University Press. ISBN 9780300221763. OCLC https://www.worldcat.org/title/tastemaker-elizabeth-gordon-house-beautiful-and-the-postwar-american-home/oclc/1002237316&referer=brief_results
