= Annie Russell Theatre =

- U.S. National Register of Historic Places
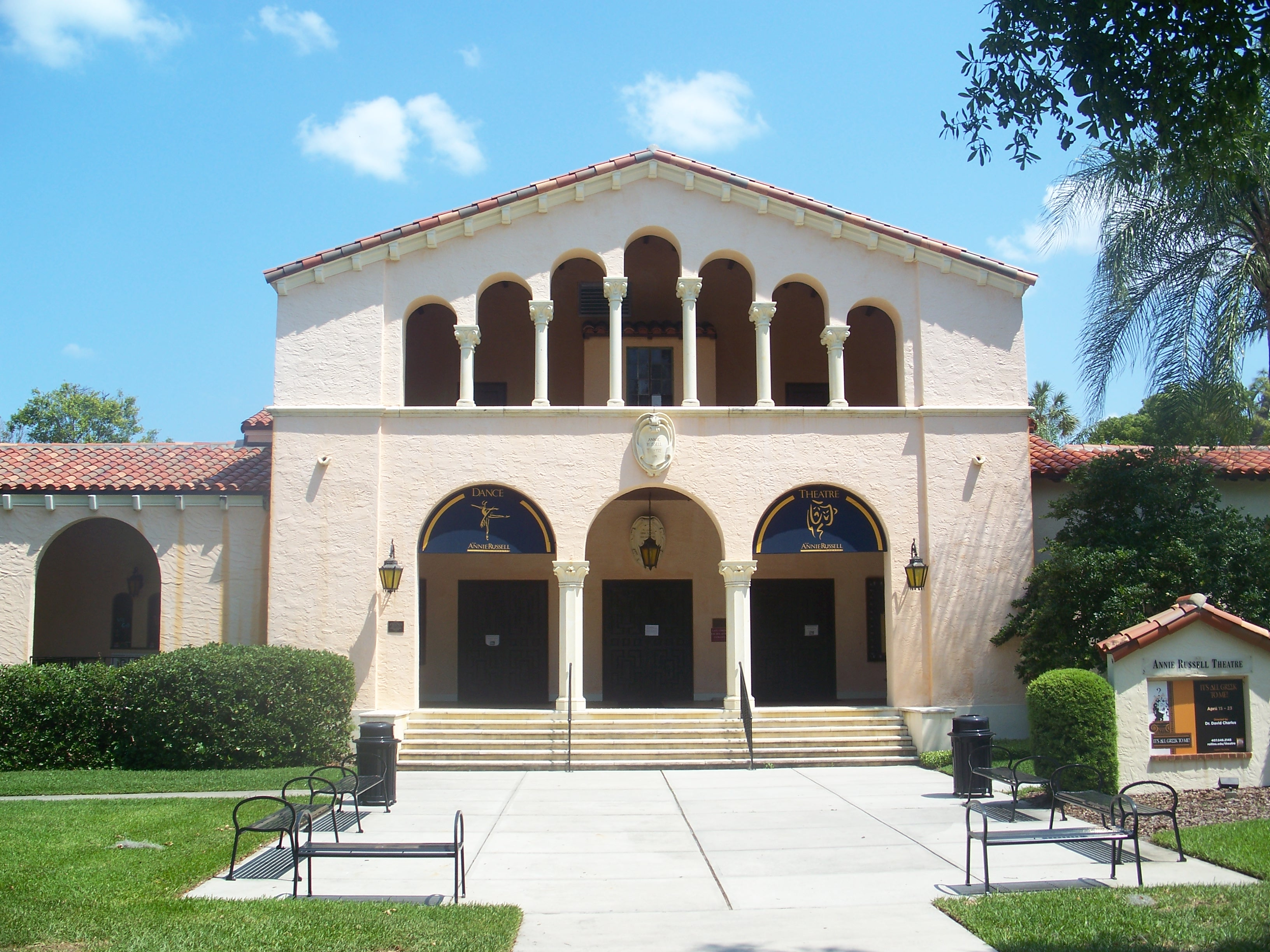

- Location within Florida Location within the United States
- Location: Winter Park, Florida
- Coordinates: 28°35′33″N 81°20′53″W
- Built: 1932
- NRHP reference No.: 98000863
- Added to NRHP: July 15, 1998

The Annie Russell Theatre is a historic theater in Winter Park, Florida, United States. The theatre was named after the English-born actress Annie Russell. It was designed by the German-born architect Richard Kiehnel of Kiehnel and Elliott and constructed in 1931. It is located on the premises of Rollins College. On July 15, 1998, it was added to the U.S. National Register of Historic Places.

== History ==
Russell emigrated to the United States at an early age. After a lengthy acting career in New York City, she relocated to New Jersey when she retired, however quickly changed her mind and moved to Winter Park in 1923. Shortly thereafter, she began teaching at Rollins College, continuing to do so until she died of lung disease in 1936.

The theatre is rumored to be haunted. Visitors to the theatre have claimed to have seen a female apparition in the second story changing room. However, due to recent structural modifications, this room can no longer be accessed.

== Productions ==
=== Main Stage ===
Season	Title	Playwright	Director	Notes
2022/2023	A Doll’s House, Pt 2	Lucas Hnath	T. Ouellette	
2022/2023	Water by the Spoonful	Quiara Alegría Hudes	N. Bazo	
2022/2023	As You Like It	William Shakespeare	E. Zivot	
2022/2023	Into the Woods	James Lapine & Stephen Sondheim	M. Barnes	
2023/2024	The 39 Steps	Patrick Barlow	M. DiQuattro	
2023/2024	Metamorphoses	Mary Zimmerman	T. Ouellette & N. Bazo	Celebrated the opening of the Sally K. Albrecht Studio Theatre
2023/2024	A Raisin in the Sun	Lorraine Hansberry	F. Chivaughn	
2023/2024	The Prom	Chad Beguelin, Bob Martin, & Matthew Sklar	M. Barnes	
2024/2025	Bike America	Mike Lew	E. Zivot	
2024/2025	Pride & Prejudice	Kate Hamill	P. O’Keef	
2024/2025	Everybody	Branden Jacobs-Jenkins	M. DiQuattro	
2024/2025	Carrie: The Musical	Michael Gore, Dean Pitchford, & Lawrence D. Cohen	M. Barnes	
2025/2026	Iphigenia in Aulis	Euripides (Transadapated by Anne Washburn)	M. DiQuattro	
2025/2026	Let the People Sing	Conner Chaumley, Yasmine Hudson, Max Payton & Marianne DiQuattro	E.B. Haynes	An original work
2025/2026	POTUS	Selina Fillinger	M. Barnes	
2025/2026	Anastasia: The Musical	Terrence McNally, Stephen Flaherty, & Lynn Ahrens	D. Charles	

=== Second Stage ===
Season	Title	Playwright	Director	Notes
2024/2025	The Grown-Ups	Simon Henriques & Skylar Fox	MG Meyer	
2024/2025	Lost Girl	Kimberly Belflower	R. Kalski	
2024/2025	Nowheresville	Lexi Shroll	K. Cohen	Shroll is an alumnus of the theatre program

== Notable alumni ==
- Janis Hirsch '72 — Fraiser
- Christopher Fitzgerald '95 — Chicago
