= Felix Semper =

American sculptor

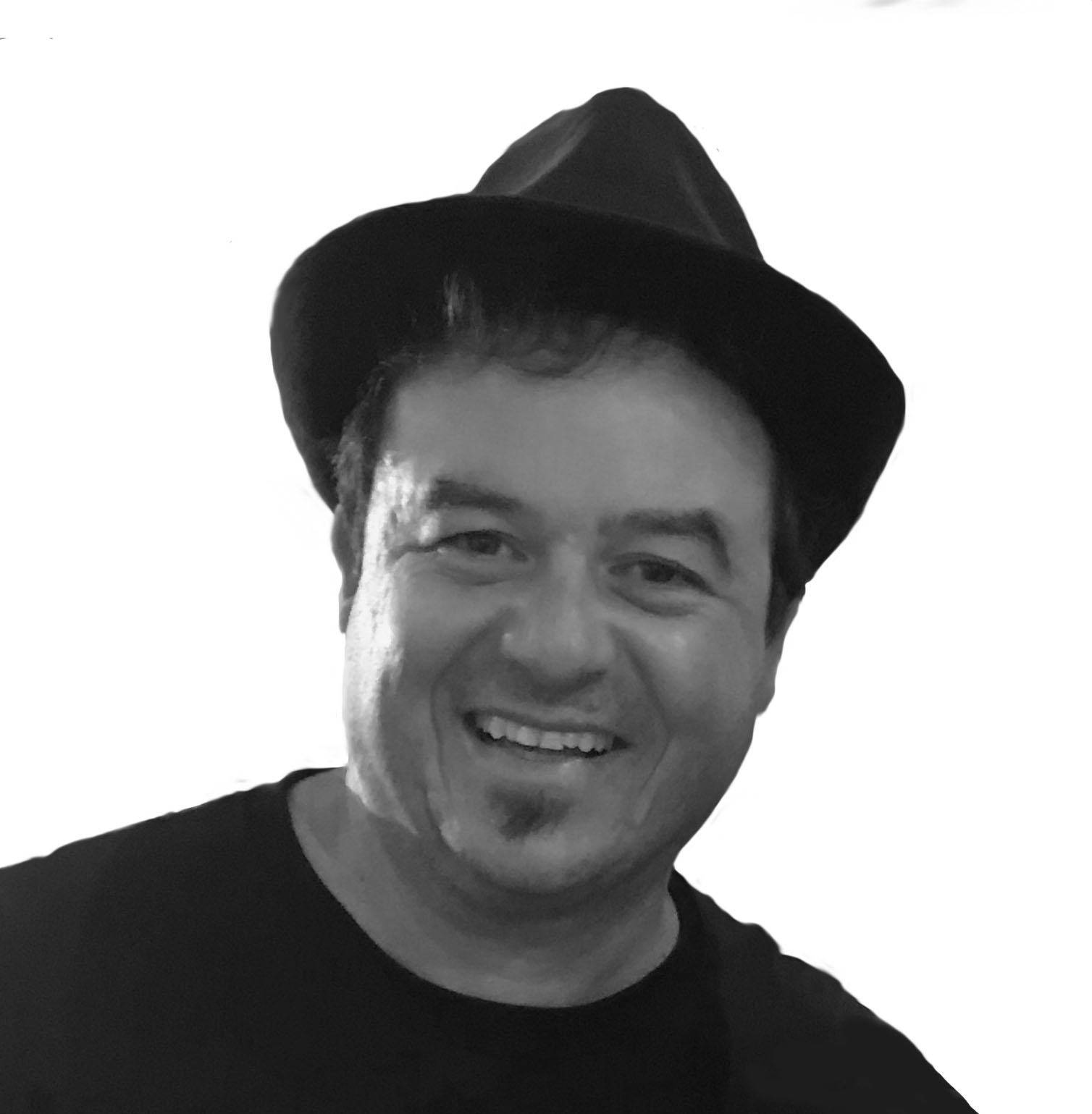
- Born: June 1964 (age 62); Havana, Cuba
- Occupations: Artist, Sculptor, Performance artist, Painter
- Website: felixsemper.com

Felix Semper (born June 1964) is a Cuban American artist. Semper gained popularity with his Notorious BIG work inspired by a photo of the late rapper The Notorious B.I.G. He crafted the sculpture from thousands of layers of glued paper.

== Exhibitions ==
Semper's first major solo exhibit in New York City took place in 2018. His work has been exhibited internationally, including representing the US in the 7th Annual Cultural & Design Expo, Suzhou, China. While in Suzhou, Felix created a moveable sculpture of the "Pants Building". In Mallorca, he exhibited a line of paper Hermes handbag sculptures.

Semper's first museum exhibition in Denmark in 2021–23,"Paper People" Museum for Papirkunst where he exhibited his stretchable paper sculpture busts of Jose Marti, Thalia, A$AP Rocky and others, also on view is Semper's documentary film "Love Art Revolution".

Semper the official artist for Playing for Change Foundation he was invited to create the 2022 Impact awards for Paula Abdul and Luis Fonsi they were presented in Miami Beach. In 2023 Semper was commissioned to create an award for Maluma.

2024 Semper created three original stretchable paper sculptures for Playing for Change foundation nominees Ellie Goulding, Diplo and Andrea Bocelli.

Semper was invited by the ministry of culture to exhibit in 2022, Riyadh, Saudi Arabia, his stretchable paper sculptures.

In 2023 he was invited by the ministry of culture to exhibit his sculptures in Abu Dhabi, and was covered by The National News.

In 2024 Semper was invited by the Qatar government at the Souq Waqif Art Center in Doha, to exhibit his latest stretchable paper sculptures, his exhibition was covered by both The Peninsula news, and TV and Hola Qatar Radio media.

He has also exhibited in Barcelona, Miami and other locations in the US.

== Television and Radio ==
Semper and his work have made various television appearances including on El Hormiguero based in Madrid, Spain, Live with Kelly and Ryan, The Wendy Williams Show, FOX- Good Day New York, MTV, NHK, PBS, Pickler & Ben, CBS-The Henry Ford's Innovation Nation, NBC-Access Hollywood . Radio: Elvis Duran and The Morning Show. The Peninsula news, The National News.

StoryBooked, a documentary series produced by Marriott International, featured Semper in an episode set in Spain.
