= Greenfield Elementary School (Pittsburgh, Pennsylvania) =

- Greenfield School
- U.S. National Register of Historic Places
- City of Pittsburgh Historic Structure
- Pittsburgh Landmark – PHLF
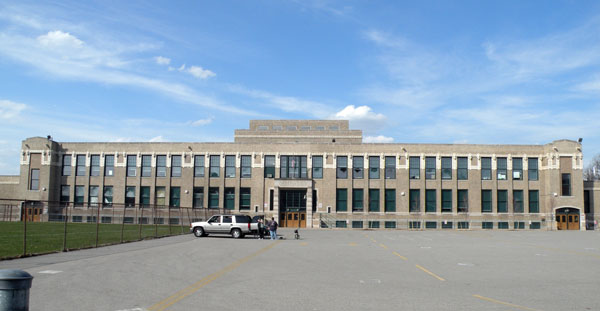

- Location within Pittsburgh Location within Pennsylvania Location within the United States
- Location: N of Greenfield Ave. at E end of Alger St., Pittsburgh, Pennsylvania
- Coordinates: 40°25′35″N 79°56′42″W
- Area: 9 acres (3.6 ha)
- Built: 1922; 104 years ago
- Architect: Kiehnel and Elliott
- Architectural style: Chicago
- MPS: Pittsburgh Public Schools TR
- NRHP reference No.: 86002671

Significant dates
- Added to NRHP: September 30, 1986
- Designated CPHS: November 30, 1999
- Designated PHLF: 1998

Greenfield Elementary School (also known as Pittsburgh Greenfield PreK-8) is a historic school in the Greenfield neighborhood of Pittsburgh, Pennsylvania. The school was designed by the firm of Kiehnel and Elliott and opened in 1922. It is part of the Pittsburgh Public Schools district and serves students in Pre-K through 8th grade.

The school was listed on the National Register of Historic Places in 1986. It is also a City of Pittsburgh historic structure and a Pittsburgh History and Landmarks Foundation Historic Landmark.

Pennsylvania also has an Albert M. Greenfield Elementary School in Philadelphia.

== History ==
The school was built in 1921–1922 as a replacement for the old Greenfield School at Greenfield Avenue and Tunstall Street and the Forward Avenue School on what is now Saline Street in Four Mile Run. These schools were built under the old ward-based sub-district system—Greenfield in 1880 by the Peebles (23rd Ward) sub-district, and Forward Avenue in 1886 by the Colfax (22nd Ward) sub-district—and were outdated and crowded by the early 20th century. In the Board of Public Education's annual report for 1914, the condition of the Greenfield School was rated as 285 out of 1000, which was the worst in the entire school system, with the Forward Avenue school also in the bottom fifteen.

The school board began planning for the replacement school in 1916, purchasing a site on Alger Street and selecting a plan by Kiehnel and Elliott. However, construction was delayed due to World War I. The board resumed construction after the war, breaking ground on three projects simultaneously: Greenfield Elementary, Perry Elementary, and Westinghouse High. Construction of Greenfield Elementary began in September, 1921, and the completed school opened for the fall term in September, 1922. The total cost was about $700,000. It was formally dedicated on March 22, 1923.

Greenfield Elementary was the first Pittsburgh school designed to operate on the "platoon" plan, where students went to a different room for each subject instead of remaining in the same room throughout the day. The school board believed that it would benefit elementary students to follow the same system used in higher education. The school served students in kindergarten through 8th grade and was equipped with specialized facilities including rooms for wood shop, drafting, and home economics, as well as an auditorium, two gymnasiums, and a swimming pool.

The school remains in operation as Pittsburgh Public Schools Greenfield PreK–8 as of 2024.

== Architecture ==
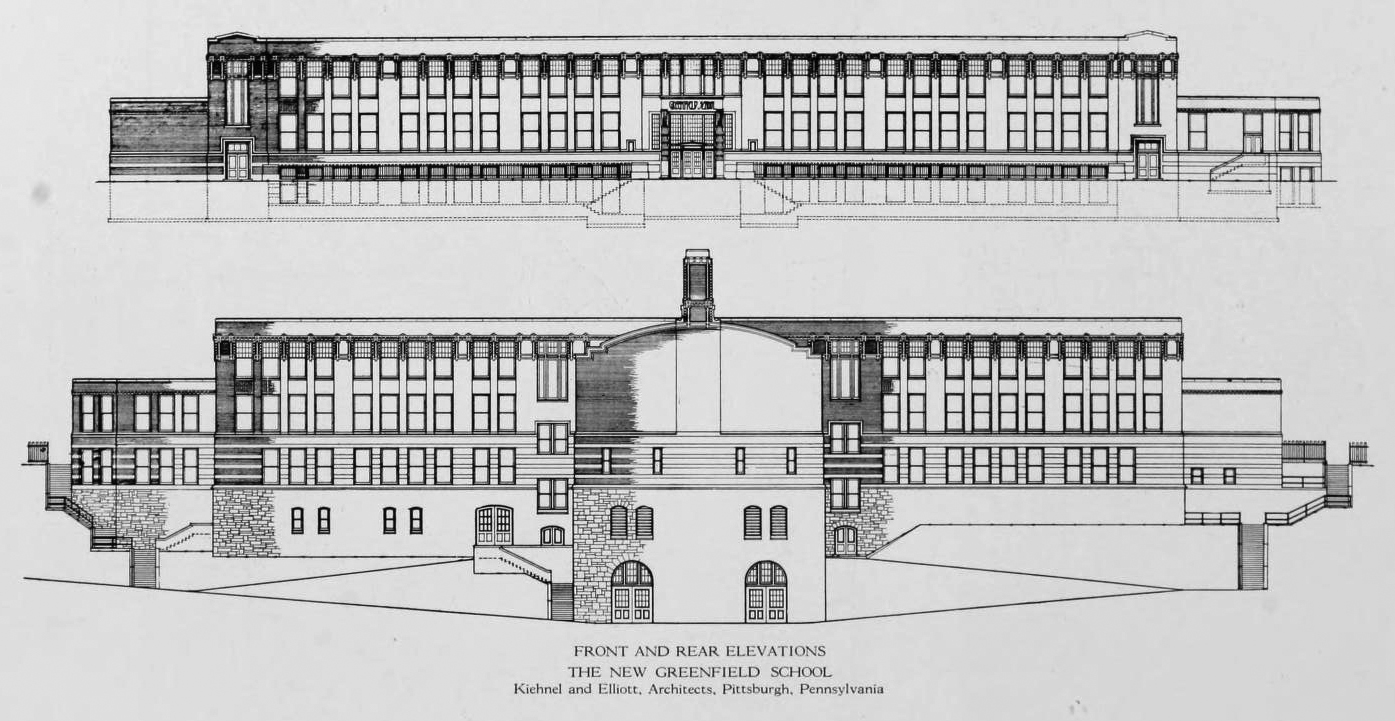
Elevation drawings by Kiehnel and Elliott, 1916

The Greenfield School was designed by the Pittsburgh firm of Kiehnel and Elliott in one of their last commissions before relocating to Miami. Architecturally, the building combines Chicago school and European modernist influences which are particularly evident in Kiehnel and Elliott's distinctive style of geometric terra cotta ornamentation, which according to the Pittsburgh History and Landmarks Foundation "shows a specific awareness of Frank Lloyd Wright's work."

The building consists of a rectangular main block with shorter projecting wings on three sides. Due to its location on a steep hillside, the school rises two stories above grade in the front and four stories in the rear. The main block is symmetrical and seven bays wide with projecting entrance pavilions at either end. The central bay contains the main entrance, which is set in a stone surround with undulating pilasters and marked with the name of the school. The outer bays each contain four 15/1 sash windows on each story with stone sills and lintels.

The main section of the school contains about 30 classrooms with a central hallway on each level and several stairwells. The projecting rear wing contains an auditorium on the top two floors, a gymnasium on the next lower level, and a swimming pool and garage on the bottom level, with a sub-basement boiler room underneath.
