= Coral Gables Preparatory Academy =

- Coral Gables Elementary School
- U.S. National Register of Historic Places
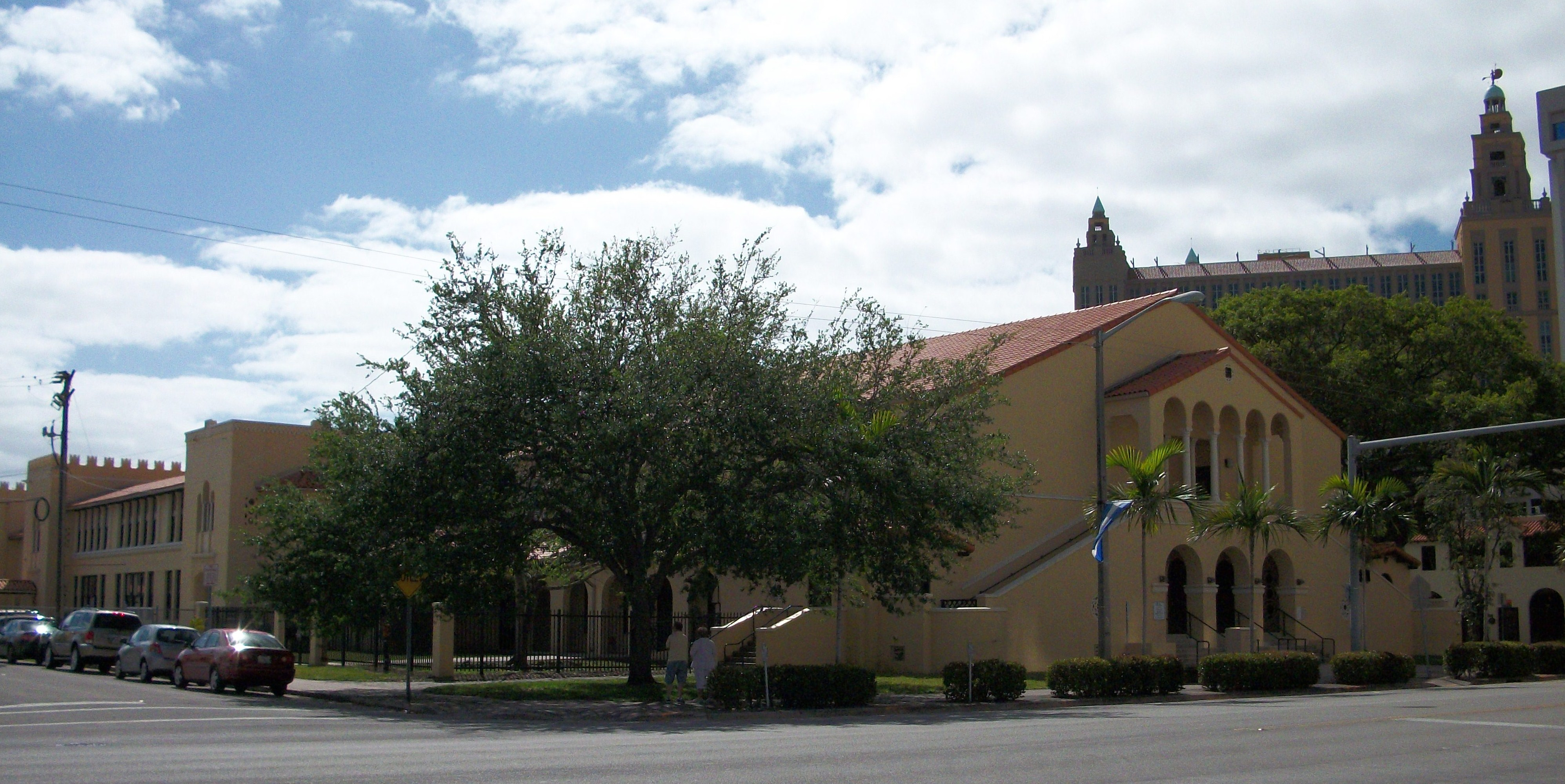
- Coral Gables Preparatory Academy in Coral Gables, Florida, April 2010

- Location within Miami Location within Florida Location within the United States
- Location: 105 Minorca Ave., Coral Gables, Florida
- Coordinates: 25.7541°N 80.2580°W
- Architect: Richard Kiehnel
- Architectural style: Mission/Spanish Revival
- NRHP reference No.: 88000750
- Added to NRHP: June 30, 1988

Coral Gables Preparatory Academy, formerly Coral Gables Elementary School, is a public K-8 school in Coral Gables, Florida. A part of the Miami-Dade County Public Schools, it has its elementary school classes in the Lower Academy, in the former Coral Gables Elementary building, while the middle school classes are in the Upper Academy at the Merrick Educational Center. The school was given its current name in 2010.

The lower academy facility is a historic school building designed by the architect Richard Kiehnel of Kiehnel and Elliott. It is located at 105 Minorca Avenue. On June 30, 1988, it was added to the U.S. National Register of Historic Places.

== History ==
=== 20th century ===
Coral Gables Elementary School opened as Coral Gables Grammar School in October 1923, with 39 pupils and one teacher, Mary Feaster Jackson. The school was financed and built by George Merrick, founder of Coral Gables, with the understanding that the Dade County School Board would repay him $10,000 for the land and $25,000 for the school building.

Because Merrick believed that "beautiful things inspire higher ideals in the minds of children," he commissioned the nationally known architectural firm of Kiehnel & Elliott to build a school of Spanish colonial architecture. In recognition of the school's major role in the architectural and cultural history of Coral Gables, it was made a "City of Coral Gables Landmark" in 1982, and placed then on the National Register of Historic Places. Between 1936 and 1948, Coral Gables Grammar School included grades 7 and 8.

In 1923, Coral Gables founder George Merrick, assigned to Mary Feaster Jackson the task of gathering 39 children required to start the elementary school. Upon completion of the third phase in 1926 the school had grown to 1,000 students.

Abigail Gilday served as its first principal until 1945. She began her teaching career at the Old Central School in 1920. She became the principal of Coral Gables Elementary in 1927, following the short tenures of J.A. O'Steen, 1923–1924, and W. A. Carter, 1924–1927. In 1934, Coral Gables Elementary School became the first school in the country to sponsor a Cub Scouts Troop, and later that year launched the Boy Patrol Program. During the school year of 1938–1939, the "Youth in a Modern Community" program designed by the PTA, gave students an opportunity to take part in fundraising events and community planning activities. Abigail Gilday served eighteen years as principal of the newly established school.

In 1945, Bertha Webb became the second principal of the school and remained as principal for 16 years to 1961. During this time the students, educators, and parents at Coral Gables Elementary initiated a war bond drive. More than $300,000 worth of war bonds and stamps were sold and purchased by the school children. In return, the children were awarded a prize by the U.S. Department of the Treasury for being first in the nation for the collection of bonds and stamps.

Jack Jaimeison became the third principal of the school from 1961 to 1971. During his decade-long tenure, Jaimeison led the way through some of the most controversial and transformative years in the school's history. Under his leadership the school launched the first Science Fair and focused heavily on technology, science and community projects but it was the integration process that began in 1970 that defined his role and legacy in the school. In South Florida desegregation began as early as 1960; it reached Coral Gables Elementary school in 1971. The effort to desegregate Coral Gables Elementary school began in 1970, when Federal Judge C. Clyde Atkins, a Coral Gables resident issued a ruling that called for the immediate integration of all school in Miami-Dade County. The following year, "all white schools" were paired with "all black schools" included in the pairing was Coral Gables Elementary and Carver Elementary. Under the plan, the first and second grades would be held at Carver and the third through sixth at Coral Gables Elementary. At first, the pairing was a controversial and divisive issue for the parents of both schools. Jaimeison responded by organizing PTA meetings for parents to voice their support or opposition to the program. As a result, the pairing program was adjusted to accommodate recommendations and through a series of efforts by parents and community leaders the partnership succeeded and the schools began the pairing program in the fall of 1971. Mr. Jaimeison retired the same year the plan went into effect.

George E. Bowker became the fourth principal of Coral Gables Elementary in 1971 and remained as principal until his retirement in 1991. He was born in Jersey City, N.J. and in 1945 at the age of 17 joined the U.S. Navy and served in the Pacific during World War II. After the war, Mr. Bowker returned to New York where he pursued a degree in education at NYU. Bowker joined the school as principal in 1971 and remained as principal until his retirement in 1991. In 1982, the school was named a Historic Landmark in Coral Gables with the Coral Gables Preservation Board. On June 30, 1988, the school was added to the U.S. National Register of Historic Places. In 1983, the school celebrated its 60th anniversary and dedicated the Eunice Peacock Merrick Garden designed by Charles, A. Alden. During his tenure Mr. Bowker presided over the integration process where students went to Carver Elementary for First and Second grade and returned to Coral Gables for the remainder of their elementary years. In 1989, the school was awarded the Golden School Award for Volunteerism, an honor which it still holds today.

In 1991, Dr. Melanie Revman Fox became the fifth principal of Coral Gables Elementary and served as principal from 1991 to 2003. In 1992, with the devastation of Hurricane Andrew, the school became the home for many misplaced Homestead families and children. The school continued to be paired with Carver Elementary for desegregation and in 1994, with the addition of F.S. 1002.31 Controlled Choice Options the school district changed the desegregation model into one of "controlled choice." Coral Gables Elementary was paired with Carver Elementary and Sunset Elementary to offer the "Controlled Choice" option to parents. This open enrollment concept paired 3 schools throughout the district. A student needed to live within the area of any of the three schools where parents could opt to have their child attend through a lottery system. Controlled open enrollment-parental choice options meant a public education delivery system that allowed the school district to make student school assignments using parents’ indicated preferential school choice, adhere to federal desegregation requirements, provide a lottery procedure to determine student assignment, establish an appeals process for hardship cases, maintain socio-economic, demographic, and racial balance.

In 1993, the school was awarded the National Blue Ribbon School of Excellence and in 1999 the school was rated an 'A' school.

=== 21st century ===
In 2003, Graciela Cheli Cerra became the sixth principal and first Hispanic principal of the school, to her retirement in 2018. During her tenure, the school received several awards of excellence, including the Platinum Award for the 'A' designation, the Sterling Challenge Award, The Five Star School Award, and several Awards of Excellence. In the summer of 2010, Coral Gables Elementary expanded its program to include grades K-8. Under the leadership of Cerra, the school took over the grounds of another school four blocks away, completely retrofitting and expanding the building to accommodate the new grade designation. The name change was met with challenges and several community meetings took place to accommodate recommendations from parents and community leaders. Officially on January 12, 2011, at the school board meeting, Coral Gables Elementary became Coral Gables Preparatory Academy with agenda item C-72 unanimously passing.

The school celebrated its 90th anniversary in 2013, and in partnership with the Coral Gables Museum, an exhibit on Inspiring High Ideals: Celebrating Ninety Years of History at Coral Gables Elementary School, 1923-2013 was on display from October 25, 2013 – February 2, 2014.

In 2016, the school at 105 Minorca became the Lower Academy housing grades Pre-K through 4th and the school at 39 Zamora Avenue became the Upper Academy housing grades 5th through 8th. As of 2017, Coral Gables Elementary continued to be the last school within the district to still adhere to Controlled Choice. Due to the continued demands of parents to make the school a neighborhood school, the school board disbanded School Choice for the 2016–2017 school year.

Coral Gables Preparatory Academy is now a neighborhood school and continues to be an A school. Because of her dedication to the school and the community Principal Cerra was awarded several Proclamations from the School Board and the City of Coral Gables.

The school has received the following awards:

- Five Star School Award, 2007–2008 school year
- Proclamation from Miami Dade County Public Schools for being in the top 4% of all of the elementary schools in the state of Florida
- Platinum Award 2003, present for the "A" designation
- Florida Sterling Council – Sterling Challenge, June 2005
- Golden School Award for Volunteerism, 1989–present
