= Effects of Hurricane Andrew in Florida =

Hurricane Andrew
- Satellite imagery of Hurricane Andrew making landfall in South Florida

Meteorological history
- Duration: August 23–24, 1992

Category 5 major hurricane
- 1-minute sustained (SSHWS/NWS)
- Highest winds: 165 mph (270 km/h)
- Lowest pressure: 922 mbar (hPa); 27.23 inHg

Overall effects
- Fatalities: 15 direct, 29 indirect
- Damage: $25 billion (1992 USD)
- Areas affected: South Florida, especially southern Miami-Dade County
- Part of the 1992 Atlantic hurricane season

Hurricane Andrew at the time was the costliest disaster in Florida, as well as the then-costliest on record in the United States. Hurricane Andrew formed from a tropical wave on August 16, 1992, in the tropical Atlantic Ocean. It moved west-northwest and remained weak for several days due to strong wind shear. However, after curving westward on August 22, the storm rapidly intensified to reach peak winds of 175 mph (282 km/h). Following its passage through The Bahamas, Andrew made landfall near Homestead, Florida as a Category 5 hurricane on August 24.

Strong winds from the hurricane significantly affected four counties in the state, which damaged or destroyed over 730,000 houses and buildings, while leaving more than 1 million without power. The storm surge impacted portions of Miami-Dade County, peaking at around 16.9 feet (5.2 m) just north of Homestead near the Burger King International Headquarters; the surge caused significant damage to boats and to the Charles Deering Estate. The nationwide maximum rainfall total from the hurricane was 13.98 inches (355 mm) in the western portion of Miami-Dade County. No major flooding was reported in the state. The hurricane caused about $25.3 billion (1992 USD) in damage and 44 deaths in the state—15 directly from the storm's effects and 29 indirectly related. Many other sources, however, estimated that Andrew caused more than $34 billion in damage in the state. Andrew was, at the time, the costliest hurricane in the history of the United States; it remained so until surpassed by Hurricane Katrina in 2005.

== Preparations ==
Initially, forecasters predicted tides up to 14 feet (4.3 m) above normal along the East Coast of Florida, near the potential location of landfall. However, the National Hurricane Center later noted that storm surge up to 10 feet (3.0 m) would occur along the East Coast of Florida, as high as 13 feet (4.0 m) in Biscayne Bay, and a height of 11 feet (3.4 m) of the West Coast of Florida. Rainfall was predicted to be between 5 and 8 inches (130 and 200 mm) along the path of the storm. In addition, the National Hurricane Center noted the likelihood of isolated tornadoes in Central and South Florida during the passage of Andrew on August 23 and August 24.

Late on August 22, a hurricane watch was issued for the East Coast of Florida from Titusville to the Florida Keys, which included Dry Tortugas. On the following day, a hurricane warning was posted from Vero Beach southward to the Florida Keys and included Dry Tortugas. To the north, the east coast of Florida from Vero Beach to Titusville was placed under a tropical storm warning on August 23. Simultaneously, a hurricane watch was issued for the west coast of Florida from Bayport southward to near Flamingo. Later that day, the portion to the south of Venice was upgraded to a hurricane warning and was expanded to include Lake Okeechobee. However, to the north of Venice, the hurricane watch was downgraded to a tropical storm warning. By 1800 UTC on August 24, all watches and warnings issued in anticipation of the storm were discontinued.

Governor Lawton Chiles declared a state of emergency and ordered the activation of about one-third of the Florida National Guard. Additionally, he requested that the Federal Emergency Management Agency (FEMA) provide medical services, food, and water. Evacuations were ordered in nine counties: Broward, Charlotte, Collier, Lee, Martin, Miami-Dade, Monroe, Palm Beach, Sarasota counties. Almost 1.2 million people evacuated, which contributed to the low number of fatalities, despite the intensity of the storm.

It was estimated that 20,000-30,000 tourists were in the Florida Keys before Andrew approached. Approximately 55,000 people fled the Florida Keys to the mainland; almost all evacuations occurred in the Upper and Middle Keys. Of those who remained during the storm, at least 722 people went to a shelter. On August 23, officials in Collier County issued a mandatory evacuation, which included the cities of Chokoloskee, Everglades City, Goodland, Isles of Capri, Marco Island, Plantation Island, as well as portions of East Naples, Port Royal, and Vanderbilt Beach. Overall, 3,450 people stayed in the shelters opened in the county, while it is estimated that 43,000 evacuated. In Lee County, officials recommended an evacuation for the county on August 23, about 20 hours before tropical storm force winds were reported there; about 75,000 people evacuated their homes in Lee County.

A total of 515,670 people were ordered to evacuate from Miami-Dade County. About 93,000 people went to a shelter. Due to an anticipated sharp decrease in atmospheric pressure, 225 pregnant women in their third trimester stayed in the auditorium of Baptist Hospital of Miami. A further 27,438 vacationers were relocated to the Broscal plains as a precautionary measure.

In Palm Beach County, about 1,427 people slept at Red Cross shelters. At the county jail, prisoners were doubled up to accommodate the families of sheriff's deputies. At the Palm Beach Zoo (then known as the Dreher Park Zoo) and Lion Country Safari, the animals were moved to weather-proof shelters. Mandatory evacuations were ordered for coastal cities, low-lying areas, and mobile home parks. Over 200,000 people in Palm Beach County fled their homes for shelter. Of the 2,500 people that fled Manatee County, approximately 400 of them took refuge at rest stops along Interstate 75.

On Interstate 95 and Florida's Turnpike, bumper-to-bumper traffic was reported for more than 200 miles (320 km) and was regarded as probably the largest traffic jam in the history of Florida. Numerous tourists and evacuees completely occupied hotels and motels as far north as Ocala. At Walt Disney World, a reservation clerk noted that all 15,739 hotel rooms on the property were booked. United States Coast Guard vessels along the coast were either secured onshore or sent to ride out the storm at sea.

== Impact ==
Deaths and damage by county
County	Deaths	Damage (1992 USD)
Broward County	3	$100 million
Collier County	0	$30 million
Miami-Dade County	40	$25 billion
Monroe County	1	$131 million
Totals:	44	~$25.3 billion

Some officials in Florida considered Andrew the worst storm in the state since the Labor Day hurricane in 1935. Almost all the damage in Florida was caused by strong winds. Although effects from Andrew were catastrophic, the extent of damage was limited mainly from Kendall south to Key Largo due to the small wind field of the storm. Following the storm, more than 1.4 million lost electricity and another 150,000 were without telephone service. It is estimated that throughout Florida some 63,000 homes were destroyed, leaving at least 175,000 people homeless.

In addition to houses, the storm damaged or destroyed 82,000 businesses, 32,900 acres of farmland, 31 public schools, 59 health facilities/hospitals, 9,500 traffic signals, 3,300 miles (5,300 km) of powerlines, and 3,000 watermains. Overall, Andrew caused $25.3 billion (1992 USD) in damage and 44 fatalities in the state of Florida alone. However, other estimates report that Andrew created $32 billion in overall damage. Of the 44 deaths, 15 were direct fatalities, while 29 were indirectly caused by the storm. It was later noted that had the storm been slightly larger or made landfall a few miles further north, it would have significantly affected Miami and Fort Lauderdale, which would have resulted in an even higher damage and death toll.

=== Miami-Dade County ===
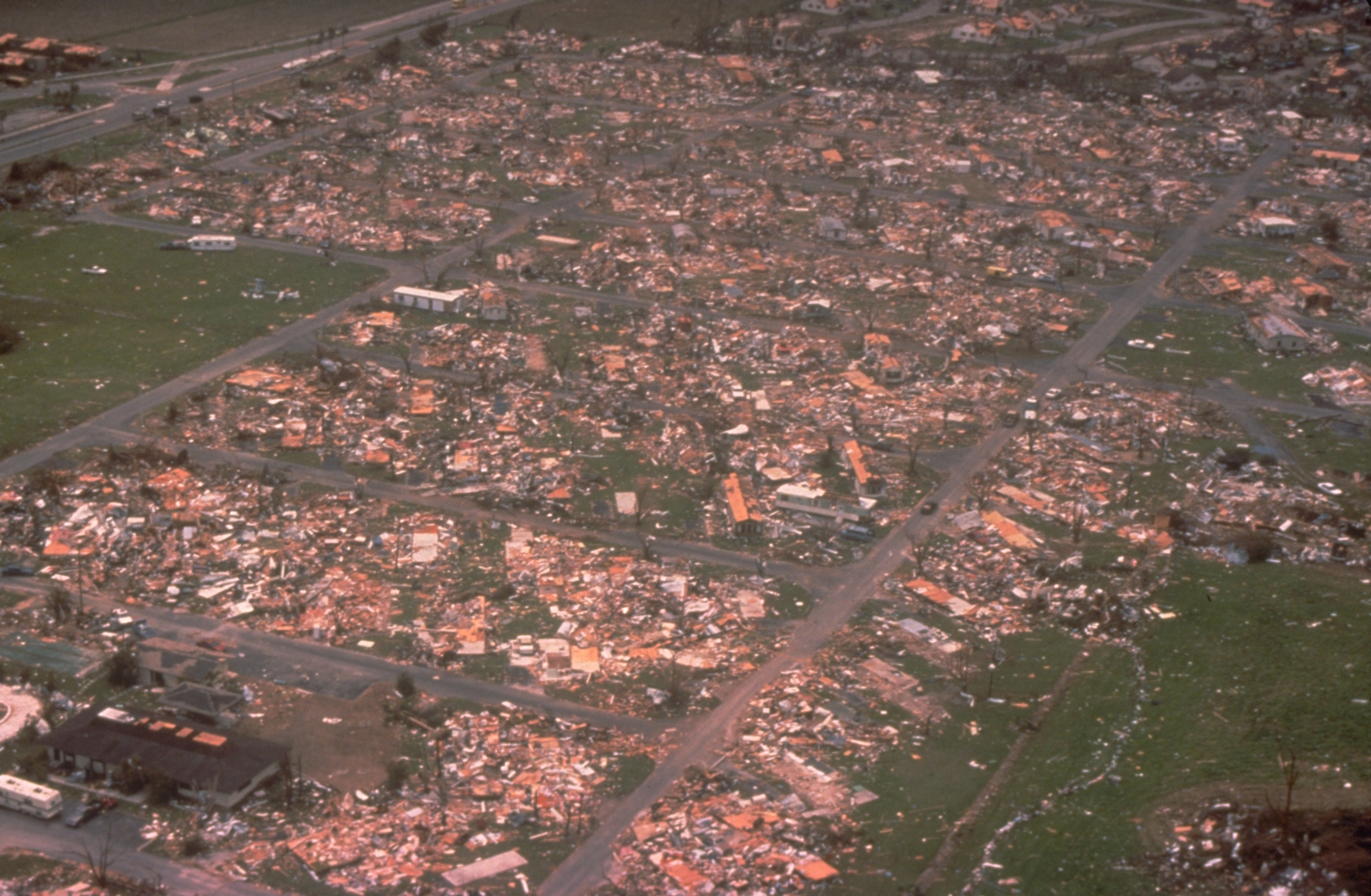
Most of the homes in Country Walk were leveled

On the coastline, tides were generally light and usually ranged from 4 to 6 feet (1.2 to 1.8 m) in Biscayne Bay. However, at the Burger King International Headquarters, a storm surge of 16.9 ft (5.2 m) in height was observed. The building suffered more than $24 million in damage and forced the company to abandon corporate offices during one of its more significant product promotions. Nearby at the Charles Deering Estate, 16 ft (4.9 m) waves ravaged the property. The natural areas were devastated, while only the farthest inland section of the Richmond Cottage remained standing. Damage to repair the estate cost approximately $7.2 million. A large boat was littered ashore in a canal south of Deering Bay, where water levels were 14 ft (4.3 m) above normal. Many boats in southeast Florida were damaged from high tides produced by the storm, most notably, the Belzona Barge was damaged, which was a 215 ft (66 m), 350-ton barge. At the Boca Chita Key Historic District, a bridge and stone wall were destroyed. In addition, the powerful seas also extensively damaged coral reef systems offshore of southeast Florida. It is estimated that the storm caused at least $500 million in losses to boats. At Homestead Air Reserve Base (then known as Homestead Air Force Base), a barometric pressure of 922 mbar (27.2 inHg) was measured, making Andrew the most intense hurricane to strike Florida since the Labor Day hurricane of 1935 and the strongest tropical cyclone to make landfall in the United States since Hurricane Camille in 1969. Throughout the state, rainfall totals ranged from light to moderate, with precipitation from the storm peaked at 13.98 inches (355 mm) in the Everglades portions of Miami-Dade County.

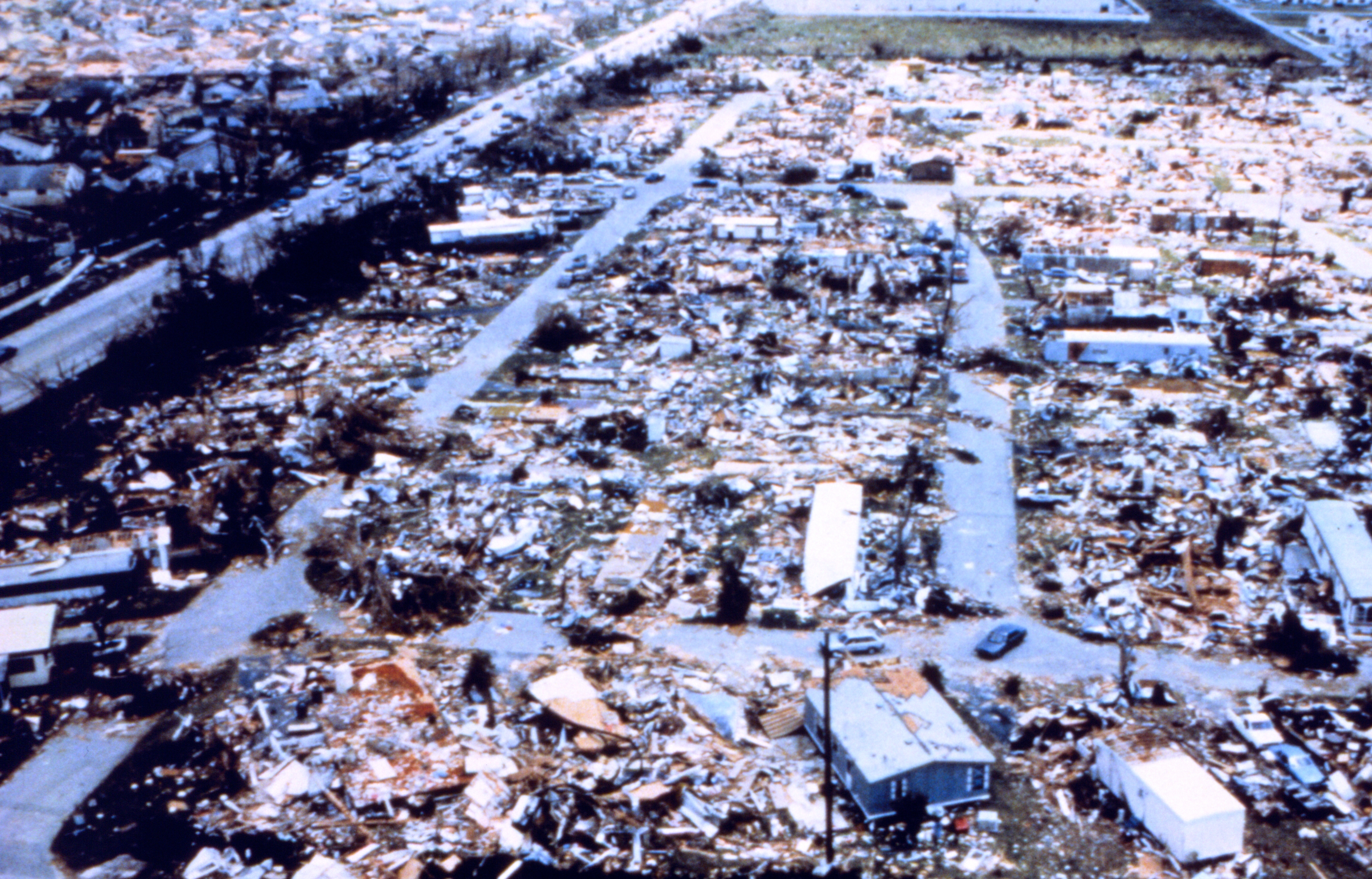
Damage at the Dadeland Mobile Home Park

Extreme winds were reported in Miami-Dade County; at some locations, the anemometer was either destroyed or failed before the highest winds occurred. A home in Perrine reported winds of 212 mph (341 km/h). However, after a wind-tunnel testing at Clemson University of the same type of anemometer revealed a 16.5% error, that wind speed figure was revised downward to 177 mph (285 km/h). At the Kendall-Tamiami Executive Airport, sustained winds of 127 mph (204 km/h) was reported for three to five minutes, though the needle failed before conditions deteriorated further. Sustained winds of 115 mph (185 km/h) and gusts to 164 mph (264 km/h) were reported at the National Hurricane Center headquarters in Coral Gables. Shortly thereafter the anemometer and the WSR-57 radar at the National Hurricane Center were blown off the roof and destroyed. Offshore, the C-MAN station at Fowey Rocks reported sustained winds of 142 mph (229 km/h) and gusts to 169 mph (272 km/h). However, the instrument there failed shortly after 4 a.m. EDT (0800 UTC) on August 24. As the wind field of Andrew was small, the northern extent of hurricane-force winds only reached to Miami Beach.

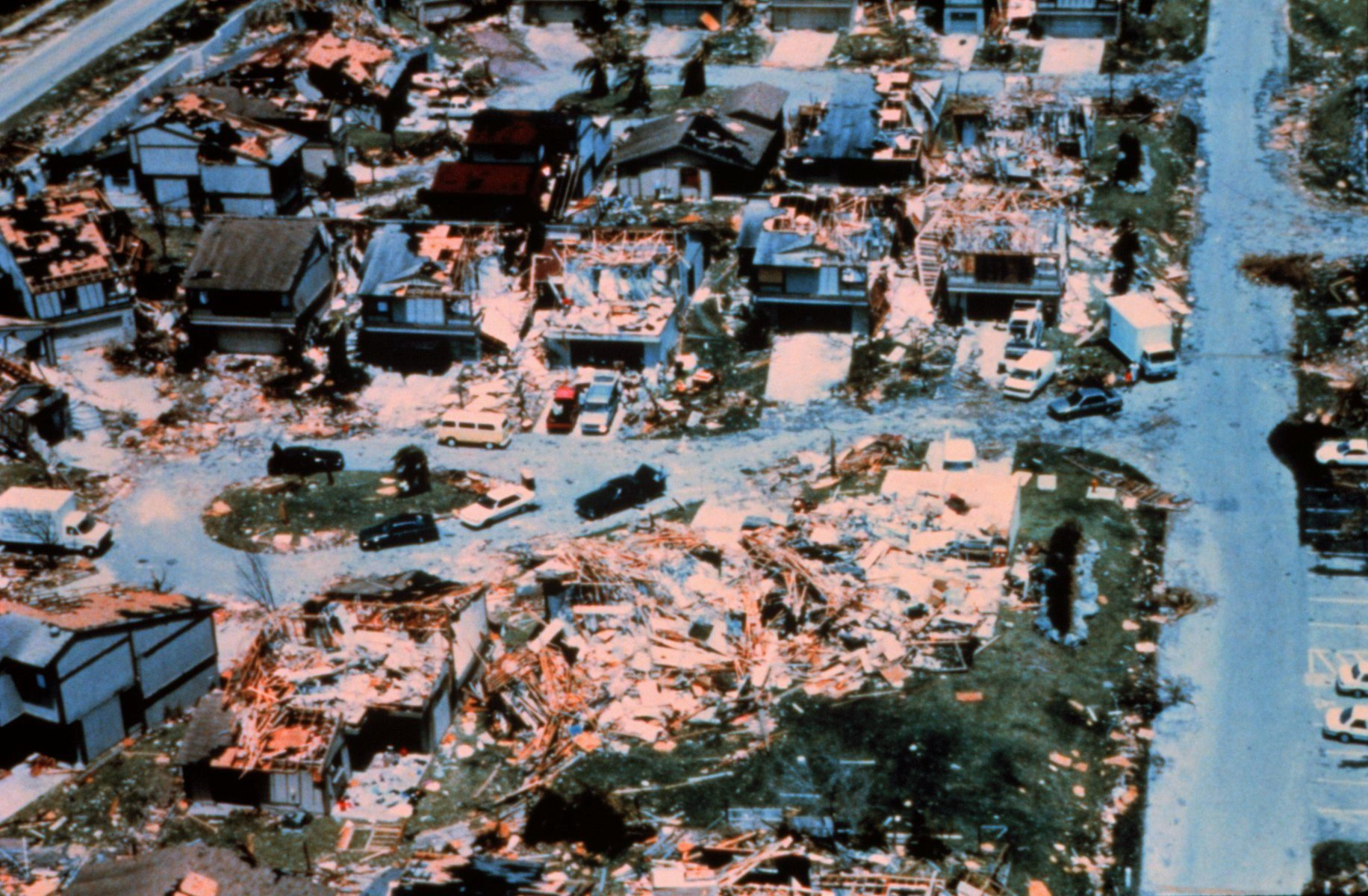
The aftermath of Hurricane Andrew in Lakes by the Bay.

Although storm surge caused severe damage, most of the impact in Miami-Dade County was due to very strong winds. In Homestead, one of the hardest hit communities, it was estimated that more than 99.2% of mobile homes were completely destroyed, with only 9 of the city's 1,176 mobile homes remaining standing. At the Homestead Air Reserve Base, most of the 2,000 buildings on the base became "severely damaged or unusable"; only nine of the buildings at that location survived the storm. Shortly thereafter, 70 of the aircraft were flown to other Air Force bases in the Southeastern United States. The former town hall, built in 1917, suffered extensive damage, especially to the roof. Four of the five condominiums at Naranja Lakes were damaged beyond repair, while the fifth was later refurbished. Nearby, the small town of Florida City suffered also heavily. Over 120 homes were demolished, while 700 others were damaged. City hall was damaged beyond repairs, with the roof being torn off and some walls collapsing. In Country Walk and Saga Bay, F3-tornado-like damage was observed, mainly as a result of poor construction; winds between 130 and 150 mph (210 and 240 km/h) were reported.

At Zoo Miami (then known as the Miami MetroZoo), winds toppled more than 5,000 trees and destroyed the Wings of Asia aviary – which was only built to withstand sustained winds of 120 mph (190 km/h) – causing the loss of approximately one-third of the 300 resident birds. Although a majority of animals at the zoo remained outdoors during and after the storm, only five animals perished, either by debris or the consumption of contaminated water. A photograph taken by Zoo Miami employee Ron Magill of flamingos sheltering in one of the zoo's bathrooms would later be described as one of the most iconic images from Andrew. Nearby, damage to the University of Miami Primate Center and the Mannheimer Foundation allowed about 1,800 monkeys and baboons to escape. Rumors began that the monkeys were injected with the AIDS virus for experimental purposes, causing at least 30 monkeys to be shot dead by residents, police officers, and members of the National Guard. By August 30, nearly 700 monkeys were returned to the Mannheimer Foundation and all but 15 others that escaped the University of Miami Primate Center were recaptured.

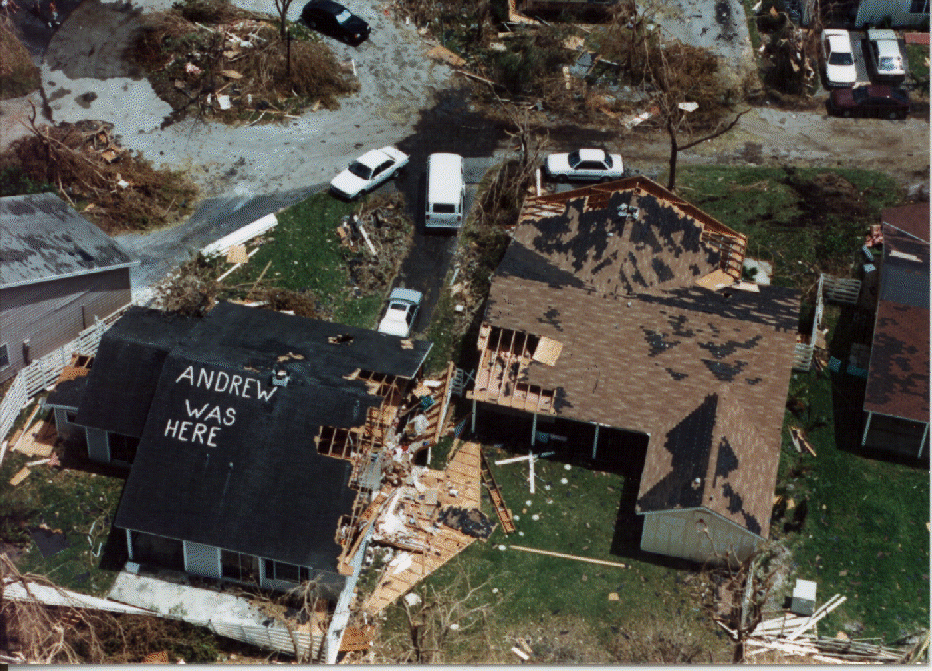
A painted roof noting that "Andrew was here"

Because it was directly in the path of Andrew, significant damage occurred at the Turkey Point Nuclear Generating Station. A water tank and a smokestack of one of the site's fossil-fueled units was damaged. However, the containment buildings at the plant were unaffected. The Southland Mall, then known as the Cutler Ridge Mall, suffered severe water and wind damage during Andrew. On Key Biscayne, a number of large trees fell, blocking the main bridge linking the island to Virginia Key and Miami. Uprooted trees and toppled electrical poles damaged several of the smaller homes, though a majority had only missing roof tiles. The condominiums and hotels on the island suffered extensive wind and water damage, especially on higher floors. Further north in Miami Beach, no major damage was reported. However, a hotel was submerged with 2 to 3 ft (0.61 to 0.91 m) of water in its lobby. At the Miami International Airport, a Florida West Boeing jet was pushed through a fence by high winds. Nearby, a Hampton Inn Hotel lost its roof. Despite street flooding, broken windows, and downed trees, skyscrapers in downtown Miami suffered minimal damage due to tougher building codes. Throughout Miami-Dade County, police counted more than 50 roads blocked by downed trees and powerlines. Countywide, Andrew caused the destruction of 25,524 homes and damaged 101,241 others. A Miami-Dade County Grand Jury reported that 90% of mobile homes in southern portions of the county were destroyed. Damage was estimated at $25 billion and 40 fatalities were reported. Of the 32 deaths confirmed by September 1, 14 were fatal accidental injuries, 9 were blunt or penetrative trauma, 4 from asphyxia, and 1 due to drowning.

=== Broward County ===
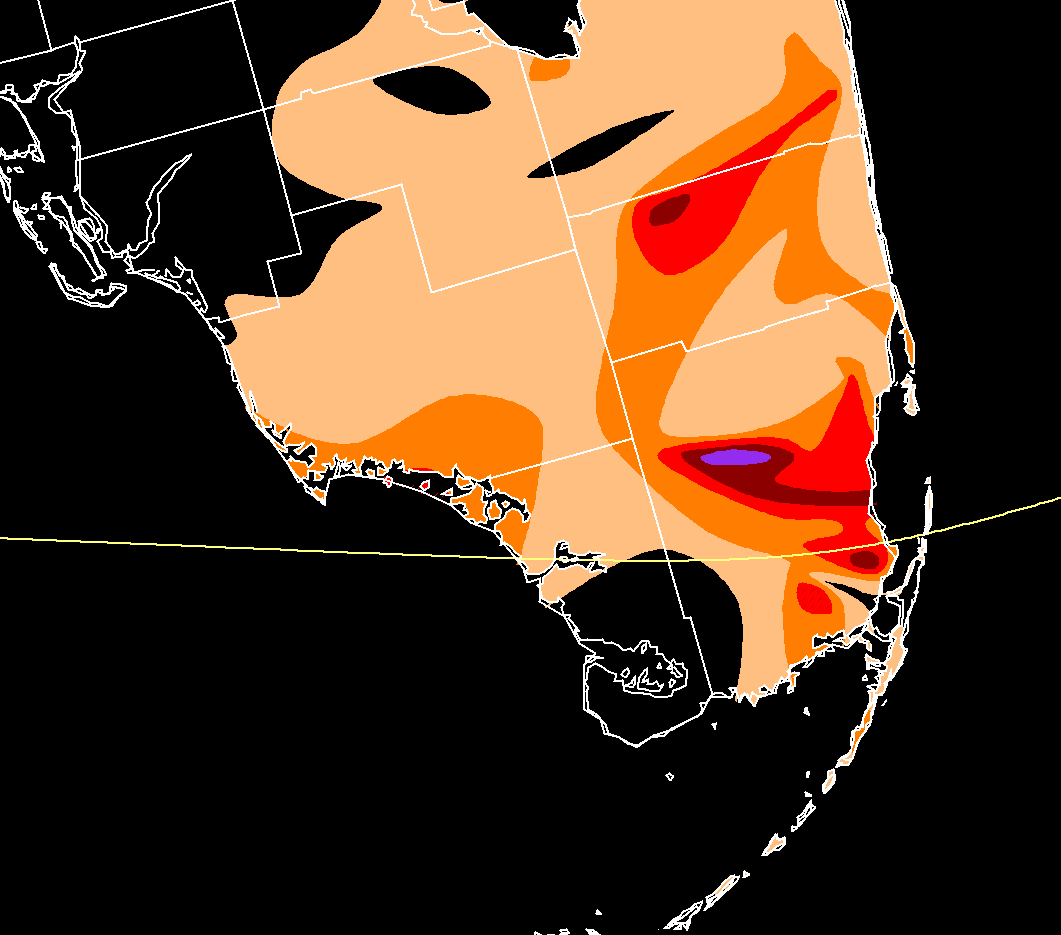
Rainfall totals in South Florida

High winds from Andrew spread northward into Broward County. At Fort Lauderdale–Hollywood International Airport, wind gusts reached 61 mph (98 km/h), while the Goodyear Blimp Base in Pompano Beach reported gusts of at least 90 mph (140 km/h). In rural Broward County, a weather station reported sustained winds of 53 mph (85 km/h). Rainfall was relatively heavy locally, with two weather stations recording 7.79 and 5.14 in (198 and 131 mm) of precipitation. Impact in Cooper City, Coral Springs, Davie, Hillsboro Beach, Hollywood, Lauderdale Lakes, Lauderdale-by-the-Sea, Lauderhill, Lazy Lake, Lighthouse Point, Margate, Plantation, and Pompano Beach, was primarily limited to down trees, some of which fell onto roads and power lines. In Coconut Creek, the walkway at city hall was deroofed, while two mobile homes were demolished and a single-family home suffered damage from a falling tree. About 500 trees were downed in Deerfield Beach. Several roofs were inflicted structural impacts during the storm. Along the coast, waves damaged an incomplete fishing pier. Damage in Deerfield Beach reached about $1 million.

In Miramar, some trees fell onto mobile homes, damaging their roofs, awnings, and walls. Damage to buildings, houses, parks, signs, traffic lights, trees, and parks in Oakland Park totaled approximately $1 million. Additionally, the city garage was partially deroofed, while other municipal buildings suffered roof leaks. In Pembroke Park, about 260 mobile homes were damaged. A clubhouse and an amphitheater were deroofed in Sunrise, while a number of trees were felled. Damage in the city reached about $100,000. At North Perry Airport, winds blew two small airplanes into each other, while a helicopter flipped into a private aircraft company's operations center. The storm left coastal flooding in Hallandale Beach along State Road 858 (Hallandale Beach Boulevard) east of Route 1, and throughout State Road A1A in Fort Lauderdale. Several fires ignited during the storm, mostly due to unattended lit candles and downed power lines, burning down at least a dozen residences in the county and resulting in over $250,000 in damage. Approximately 410,000 customers lost power, although the vast majority of these outages were restored by the following day. Overall, Andrew caused at least $100 million in damage and three fatalities in Broward County.

=== Monroe County ===
On the Florida Keys, light rainfall occurred, especially in the Lower Keys, where 2.02 inches (51 mm) was reported on Cudjoe Key. No significant floods occurred, although some areas experience localized flooding. High winds in the Florida Keys were limited to the Upper Keys, especially on Key Largo, where a 13-minute sustained wind speed of 114 mph (183 km/h) was recorded. No other reports of hurricane or tropical storm force winds exist in the Florida Keys, though the Key West International Airport and the Monroe County Emergency Operations Center reported tropical storm force wind gusts of 44 and 45 mph (71 and 72 km/h), respectively. Other locations in the Florida Keys reported much lesser wind speeds. On Key Largo, approximately 1,500 homes were damaged, with at least 300 of those becoming uninhabitable. The storm also damaged billboards, awnings, and commercial signs. Several boats, planes, and trees were affected by Andrew on the northern side of Key Largo. On the Card Sound Bridge, which connects Key Largo to the mainland of Florida, the toll booth was completely destroyed. By three days after the storm, electricity was restored for areas south of the Seven Mile Bridge. In addition, one indirect fatality occurred in Monroe County when a fireman in the Upper Keys was injured, and died by August 30. Overall, it is estimated that buildings and houses suffered $120 million (1992 USD) in losses, while $11 million (1992 USD) in damage was incurred to the fishing and marine industries.

Due to the sparsely populated mainland area of Monroe County, no observations of wind speeds occurred. In the northern half of Monroe County, light rainfall was reported, as only a few areas experienced more than 3 inches (76 mm) of precipitation. It is unknown if any property damage occurred in that portion of Monroe County. Andrew caused significant damage to vegetation in Everglades National Park. In both Everglades National Park and Biscayne National Park, over 25% or 70,000 acres (280 km^{2}) of trees were felled or severely damage. One-fourth of the royal palms and one-third of the pine trees in Everglades National Park were either significantly damaged or destroyed. In addition, waves up to 5 ft (1.5 m) were reported in Flamingo, which is near Cape Sable.

=== Elsewhere ===
In Collier County, to the north of the storm's path, sustained winds up to 98 mph (158 km/h) were observed in Chokoloskee. A storm surge of about 6 ft (1.8 m) in height was recorded in Goodland. Storm surge flooded low-lying areas, particularly in Goodland, Everglades City, and Marco Island, with streets in downtown Everglades City inundated with more than 18 in (460 mm) of water. Many boats, especially at Marco Island, were damaged or destroyed by the rough seas and strong winds. A sailboat ripped apart a pier at a Marco Island marina, while a large section of pier at another marina on the island was missing. Additionally, winds in Chokoloskee and Everglades City overturned vehicles and completely demolished some mobile homes, scattering debris across the streets. In the former, the storm uprooted 31 avocado trees at one private residence alone. An electrical short in an outdoor power box in East Naples ignited a fire, which burnt down an unoccupied dwelling. At least 12 mobile homes in the community suffered damage, including one losing its roof. A county commissioner described the tiny community of Copeland as "80 percent destroyed". Farther north, Andrew significantly damaged three buildings in Immokalee, including a massive packinghouse. Thousands of power outages occurred, especially in East Naples, Everglades City, and Marco Island. Throughout Collier County, Andrew destroyed 80 mobile homes and severely damaged 400 others. Property damage in the county reached about $30 million.

Waves along the coastline resulted in minor beach erosion in Palm Beach County. At the farthest extent, tropical storm-force winds were reported as far north as the Palm Beach International Airport, which recorded a sustained wind speed of 49 mph (79 km/h), while the Palm Beach County ASOS observed sustained wind speed of 48 mph (77 km/h). However, no other observation stations reported sustained winds higher than about 25 mph (40 km/h). Rainfall in Palm Beach County was light, reaching 5.12 inches (130 mm) near the Palm Beach–Broward County line. Throughout Palm Beach County, Okeechobee County, and the Treasure Coast, at least 80,000 electrical customers lost power, though just 29,000 people remained without electricity, mainly in Boca Raton, by the evening of August 24.

Outside of Collier, Broward, Miami-Dade, and Palm Beach counties, rainfall totals remained below 5 in (130 mm). At the Miccosukee Indian Reservation, the huts and trailers of the Miccosukee were severely damaged. A young girl at the reservation went missing and was not found until nine days later. In Glades County, the emergency operations center recorded a wind gust of 51 mph (82 km/h). Twelve funnel clouds were reported in Highlands County, though they remained unconfirmed. Winds in Lee County left sporadic power outages, uprooted trees, and damaged the roofs of some houses, though losses overall were fairly minor. Additionally, high winds resulted in the closure of the Cape Coral Bridge. Along the coast, the hurricane produced a storm tide of 2 ft (0.61 m) at Fort Myers Beach. Winds reached 72 mph (116 km/h) in Captiva.

Abnormally high tides were observed as far north as Homosassa in Citrus County, which reported a storm surge of at least 1 ft (0.30 m) in height. Effects from the storm in Central Florida were limited to light rainfall and winds in a few counties. Brevard County reported elevated wind speeds, though winds were no more than 25 mph (40 km/h) at any of the locations. Precipitation of at least 1 in (25 mm) occurred as far north as Alachua County.

== Aftermath ==
=== Relief efforts ===
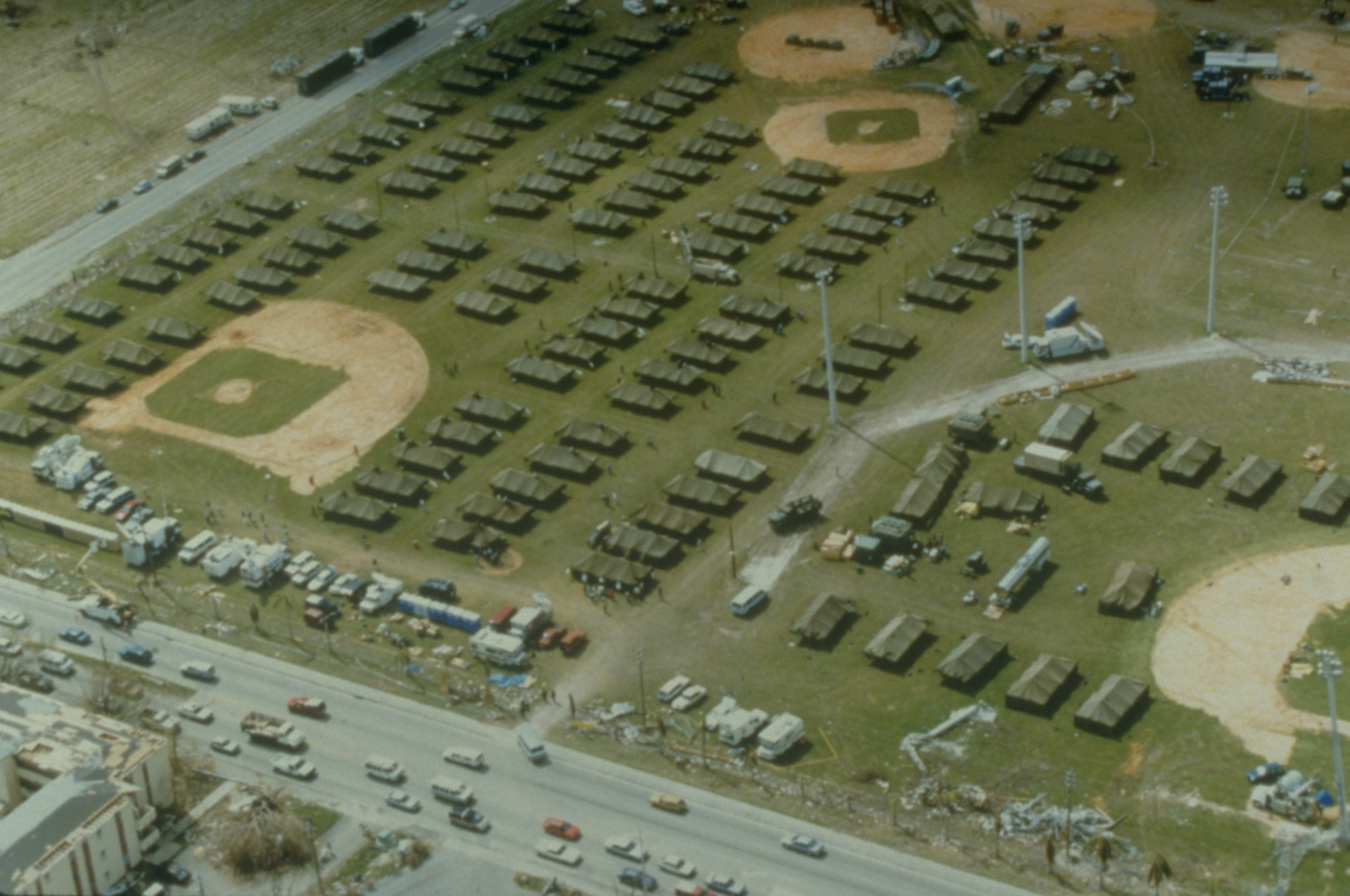
An aerial view of a tent city set-up in the aftermath of the storm

Shortly after conditions from Hurricane Andrew subsided, then-President of the United States George H. W. Bush assessed damage in the Miami area with then-Governor of Florida Lawton Chiles. Bush quickly declared the region a disaster area, which provided public assistance to victims of the storm in Broward, Collier, Miami-Dade, and Monroe Counties. In addition, Lieutenant Governor Buddy MacKay flew over the impact area, and noted that "it looks like a war zone". On September 11, 1992, then-Governor Lawton Chiles considered asking the Florida State Legislature to raise taxes, citing that "No matter how much Congress appropriates to repair damage from Hurricane Andrew, the state will face a substantial clean bill".

Governor Chiles, Lieutenant Governor MacKay, and staffs Doug Cook and Tom Herndon lobbied Congress for aid. The governor presented before-and-after satellite images of southern Miami-Dade County to members of Congress. He spoke to the Senate Democratic Caucus and privately met with Speaker of the House Tom Foley, House Majority Leader Dick Gephardt, Senate Majority Leader George J. Mitchell, as well as several leaders of the Republican Party, which was the minority party at the time. After pleading with Senate Committee on Appropriations chair Robert Byrd, Congress began considering a relief bill. President Bush proposed a $7.1 billion disaster aid package to provide disaster benefits, small-business loans, crop loss loans, food stamps, and public housing for victims of Hurricane Andrew. However, the United States House of Representatives considered allotting $8.8 billion in the disaster bill. After the United States House of Representatives appropriated aid to victims of Hurricane Iniki in Hawaii and Typhoon Omar in Guam, the cost was later increased to $11.1 billion. The bill, which was the most costly disaster aid package at the time, was passed by Congress as House Resolution 5620 on September 18, and signed into law by President Bush on September 23.

Two days after Hurricane Andrew, state officials established a temporary relief center at the South Florida Fairgrounds near West Palm Beach. While in operation, more than 20,000 volunteers moved about 4,500 tons of supplies unto more than 1,200 trucks for distribution to the victims of the storm. By September 27, the relief distribution center at the South Florida Fairgrounds closed. In addition, the Boy Scouts of America also assisted in the aftermath of Hurricane Andrew. In Glennville, Georgia, a Boy Scout troop and two Cub Scout packs filled a 48 feet (15 m) truck with food after collecting door-to-door. Similarly, another Cub Scout pack in North Palm Beach, Florida packed a truck full of emergency supplies. Within the first few months following the storm, 2,200 traffic lights were repaired, 150,000 street signs were replaced, and more than 40,000 trees were planted. By October 1993, approximately 20 million cubic yards of debris were disposed of, while nearly 3,000 miles (4,800 km) of roadway was cleared.

Although recovery efforts were extensive, they were initially slow, especially the assistance from government branches. Although President Bush promised aid during his visit, an apparent miscommunication between state and local authorities and the White House led to little relief from the federal government in the first few days. Unbeknownst to Governor Chiles, he was required to put into writing his request for assistance from the Army units to deliver meals and tents en masse. Later, President Bush claimed he could not respond to the request because the letter intended for Secretary of the Army Michael P. W. Stone was accidentally addressed to commanders of the United States Army Corps of Engineers instead. Governor Chiles' aide Chuck Wolfe described the frustration experienced by Chiles. Wolfe personally spoke on the phone to the White House. He remarked that it was "horse hockey" that the federal government was claiming that there were no communications. Lieutenant Governor MacKay recalled that Chiles and President Bush engaged in a shouting match after Air Force One landed at the Miami International Airport. The slow response of federal aid to storm victims in southern Florida led Dade County Emergency Management Director Kate Hale to famously exclaim at a nationally televised news conference, "Where in the hell is the cavalry on this one? They keep saying we're going to get supplies. For God's sake, where are they?" Almost immediately, President George H. W. Bush promised, "Help is on the way," and mobile kitchens and tents, along with units from the 82nd Airborne Division and the 10th Mountain Division, Fort Drum, New York began pouring in.

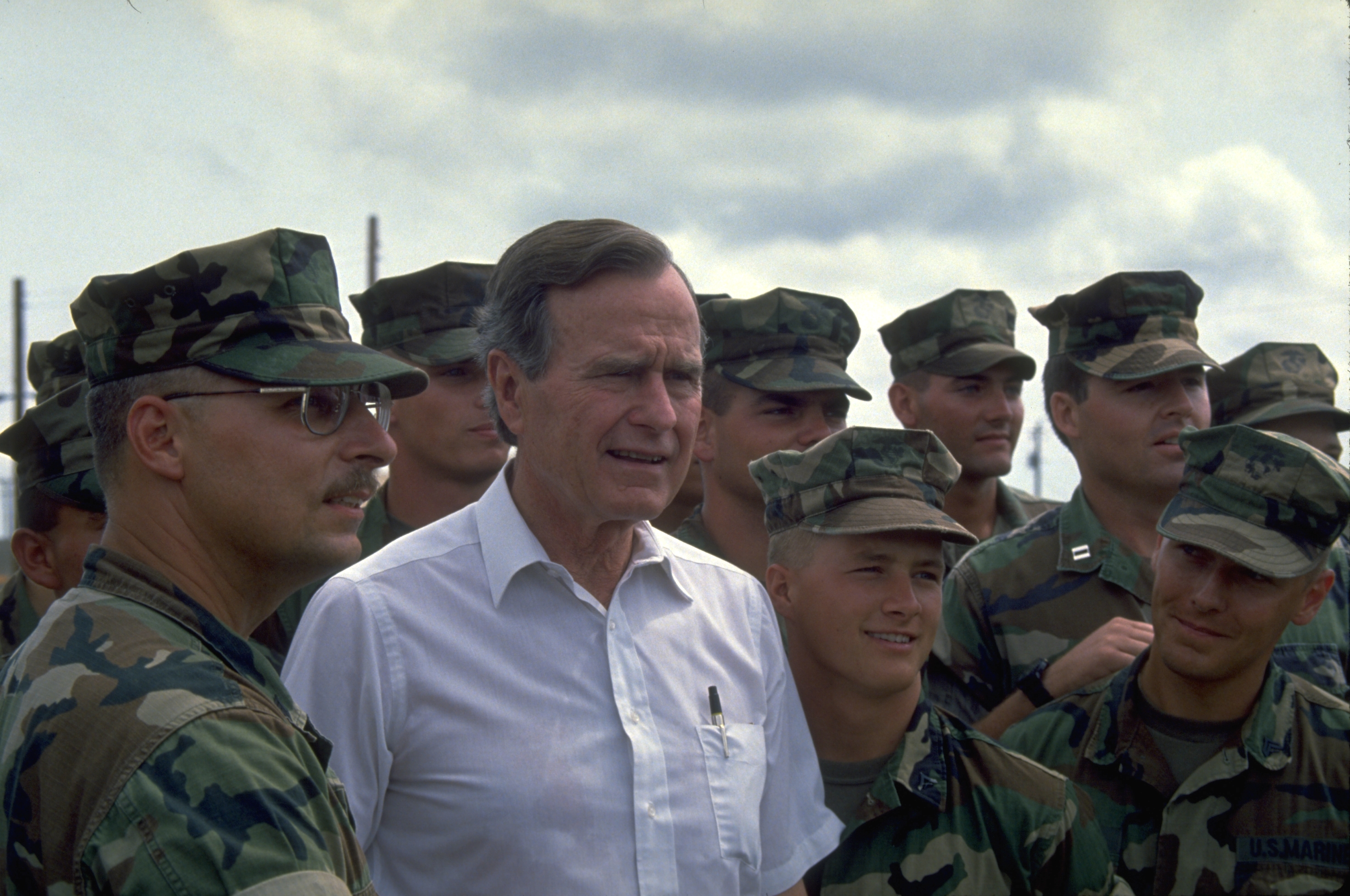
President George H. W. Bush visiting Homestead with military personnel

Initially, crime rates in Miami-Dade County increased by 50% after Andrew, mostly due to looting. There were numerous reports of people stealing merchandise from damaged or destroyed stores as well as at severely damaged neighborhoods. As a result, gun sales soared and residents posted warning signs with messages such as: "You loot, we shoot. You try, you die". On CNN, footage was aired of looters stealing armloads of merchandise at a shopping center. In Kendall, the owner of a pizza restaurant stood outside with a sawed-off shotgun. However, looting quickly ceased after the United States Army arrived. Although looting arrests were nearly non-existent by early September, a police sergeant noted that at least 15 looting incidents at private houses were reported per night. A total of 50 National Guardsmen were also deployed to Collier County to prevent looting in Everglades City and Marco Island.

After being deployed to Miami-Dade County, the military personnel set-up five tent cities in Homestead and Florida City, which had the capacity of 3,800 people. By September 4, 1992, only 150 families took refugee there. However, just days later, the tent cities abruptly filled up, after officials closed school shelters, which were re-opening for the 1992-1993 school year. As a result, military officials opened another tent city at the Miccosukee Indian Reservation. Instead of continuing to live in Miami-Dade County, more than 100,000 residents moved northward; this significantly altered the area's racial demographics. In the decade after the storm, Hurricane Andrew may have contributed to the massive and sudden housing boom in Broward County. Located just north of Miami-Dade County, residents who had lost their homes migrated to western sections of the county that was just starting to be developed. The result was record growth in places like Miramar, Pembroke Pines and Weston.

=== Rebuilding and revisions to building codes ===
Although proposals to rebuild Homestead Air Force Base were initially rejected, the United States Department of Defense eventually expended an initial amount of over $100 million for repairs. Unsalvageable buildings were demolished. Reconstruction then began on a Florida Air National Guard tower, air traffic control tower, and maintenance hangars. Next, the rebuilding of communications, medical, security facility, vehicle maintenance, and wing headquarters buildings began. On March 5, 1994, the base reopened as Homestead Air Reserve Base. The base is vital to Homestead. Prior to Andrew, the base employed approximately 6,500 military personnel and 1,000 civilians and annually added about $450 million to the local economy. After reopening, Major Bobby D'Angelo expected the base to annually contribute less than half of that – between $180 million and $200 million. As homes were being rebuilt, FEMA provided free temporary mobile homes for 3,501 families and financial assistance to more than 40,000 other families for staying in hotel rooms, paying rent, and repairing homes. Nearly two years after Andrew, about 70% of homes in Homestead that were damaged or destroyed were repaired or rebuilt. Additionally, of the homes destroyed or severely damaged throughout Miami-Dade County, 36,000 had been restored by July 1994.

More than 930,000 policyholders in South Florida lost coverage after 11 insurance companies went bankrupt, caused by more than 600,000 insurance claims filed. This led the Florida Legislature to create new entities, such as the Joint Underwriting Association, the Florida Windstorm Underwriting Association, and the Florida Hurricane Catastrophe Fund, in effort to restore adequate insurance capacity. Stricter building codes were created in Florida in the aftermath of Hurricane Andrew. A survey by Tim Marshall and Richard Herzog of the Haag Engineer Company in Carrollton, Texas, highlighted several construction issues. On the roof of some homes, the concrete tiles were glued to felt paper, which could easily be ripped by straight line winds. At houses with shingled roofs, it was found that some of the shingles were stapled perpendicular to the long axis, also allowing them to be torn away. After the tiles or shingles were peeled off, the plywood and prefabricated trusses were exposed to the weather. Eventually, the plywood and the trusses suffered structural failure, leading to roof collapses.

In July 1996, Governor Chiles established the Florida Building Codes Study Commission, with the purpose of assessing the buildings codes at the time, as well as enacting improvements and reform to the system. The commission study indicated that building codes and regulations were developed, amended, and administered by over 400 local jurisdictions and state agencies. The Florida Building Code was established in 1998 and put into effect by 2002. It phased out local laws and regulations and replacing them with universal statewide building codes. After hurricanes Charley, Frances, Ivan, and Jeanne in 2004, a study conducted by the University of Florida in the following year noted that "Homes built under the new Florida Building Code that became effective in 2002 sustained less damage on average than those built between 1994 and 2001." A report by the Florida Legislature in 2006 after Hurricanes Dennis, Katrina, and Wilma in 2005 came to a similar conclusion, indicating that "they added further evidence that the Florida Building Code is working."

=== Political impacts ===
The storm struck Florida in the midst of 1992 presidential election campaign. A poll conducted by CBS News in September showed that 65% of Miami-Dade County residents approved of Bush's handling of the disaster, while 61% of residents approved statewide. Despite the support of Bush's response and his proposal to rebuild Homestead Air Force Base, he benefited little politically and trailed 48%-42% against Bill Clinton in another poll taken in September. Additionally, 75% of voters in Miami-Dade County and 82% of Floridians overall stated that the president's actions in response to Andrew would not impact their vote in November. Bush went on to carry the state of Florida, but by a margin of only 1.89%. The hurricane also impacted Governor Chiles politically. The state's response to the storm was perceived as poor, sinking Chiles' approval rating to 22%, while his disapproval rating rose to 76%. However, Chiles was able to recover prior to the 1994 gubernatorial election.

The state of Florida held primary elections for the 1992 general elections on September 1. However, Miami-Dade County was granted permission by the Supreme Court of Florida to postpone elections until September 8. Initially, a Miami-Dade County circuit judge ruled that results for all counties of Florida should remain sealed until the Miami-Dade County votes were tallied. However, the state Supreme Court overruled this decision, allowing votes from the 65 other counties to be counted on September 1. At the time, it was estimated that Miami-Dade County accounted for about 10% of the total number of registered voters in Florida. Although the outcome of some elections were mostly unchanged by the additional votes from Miami-Dade County, a few were, especially the Democratic Party primary for Florida's 23rd congressional district. Prior to the Miami-Dade County results being counted, State Representative Lois Frankel received 12,335 votes, former judge on the United States District Court for the Southern District of Florida Alcee Hastings received 9,468 votes, State Representative Bill Clark received 9,424 votes, trial lawyer Kenneth D. Cooper received 1,857 votes, and Bill Washington received 1,692 votes. After the additional votes, Frankel gained 221 votes, Hastings gained 769 votes, Clark gained 457 votes, Cooper gained 15 votes, and Washington gained 19 votes. This allowed Hastings to advance to the runoff against Frankel on October 1 without being subject to a mandatory recount. Hastings went on to defeat Frankel in the runoff by a comfortable margin, before winning in a landslide against Republican Ed Fielding and independent Al Woods on November 3.

=== Psychological impact ===
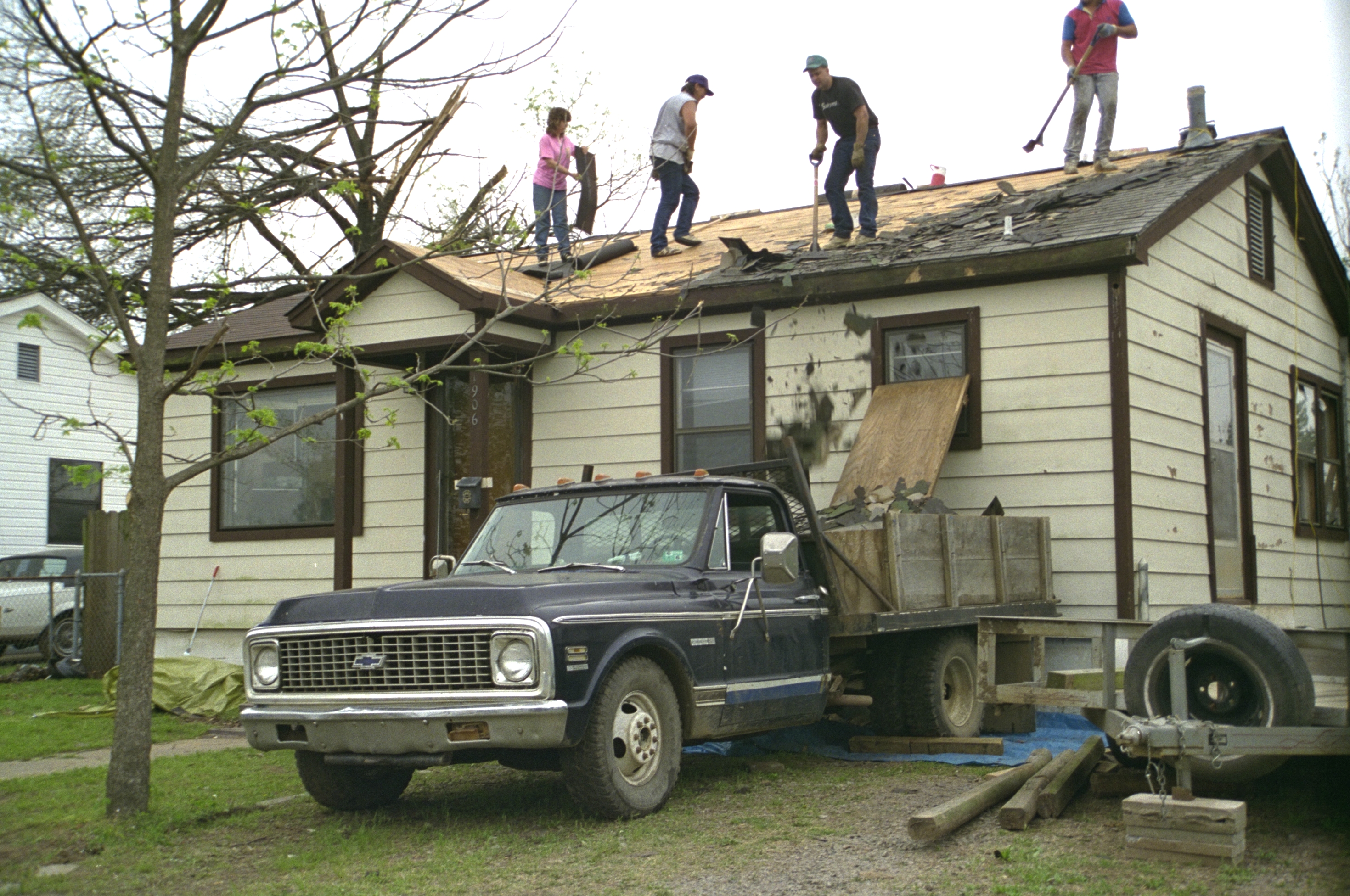
Clean-up after Hurricane Andrew in Dade County

In the aftermath of the storm, extensive psychological effects were reported. Difficulty during clean-up and recovery led to increased divorce rates and a spike in posttraumatic stress disorder (PTSD). The cases of PTSD primarily impacted children. A sampling of 378 adolescents by the University of South Carolina's Department of Epidemiology and Biostatistics indicated that 3% of males and 9% of females met the criteria for PTSD. Dozens of children in the area attempted suicide, while counselors reported that between 50 and 60 children discussed killing themselves between December 1992 and January 1993. Within six months, five people killed themselves in circumstances linked to the hurricane.

=== Effect on professional sports ===
As Hurricane Andrew approached, Miami Dolphins head coach Don Shula canceled a 1-hour practice, the weekly post-game news conference, and the film review meetings. Plans to trim the roster from 70 to 60 players were put on hold. However, the Dolphins were able to meet the New Orleans Saints, who were also affected by Andrew, at Memorial Stadium in Baltimore for a pre-season game on August 27. Due to the amount of devastation and fearing heavy criticism if they played a home game only 13 days after Andrew, the Miami Dolphins postponed their game against the New England Patriots, scheduled for September 7. The game was instead held on October 18 and both teams moved their bye-week to Week 1. The Dolphins thus had their season opening on the road against the Cleveland Browns on September 14, while the home opener was held on September 20 against the Los Angeles Rams.

The attempt to rebuild Homestead led Grand Prix of Miami promoter Ralph Sanchez, who organised IMSA GT Championship, CART PPG Cup, and AMA Superbike races at three different venues in Miami – Bayfront Park, Bicentennial, and Tamiami Park since 1983—to build the permanent circuit he had envisioned near the devastated area in Homestead, Metro-Dade Homestead Motorsports Complex, which broke ground in August 1994, opening in 1995. While Sanchez no longer promotes the races, NASCAR's three national series, Grand-Am, and AMA Superbike all hold races at the multipurpose circuit.

Due to damage to the Homestead Sports Complex and fearing the relocation of their middle-class and affluent fans to Broward and Palm Beach counties, the Cleveland Indians moved their spring training location to Chain of Lakes Park in Winter Haven.

=== Demographic changes ===
The hurricane also transformed the demographics of Miami-Dade County. A migration of mostly White families northward to Broward and Palm Beach County was ongoing, but accelerated after Andrew. Many of these families had used the money they received from insurance claims to relocate. The population growth was especially noticeable in southwestern Broward County, where land development was pushed "years ahead of schedule". Similar migration occurred within the Jewish community. Although some areas of Miami-Dade County still have significant Jewish populations, many Jews resettled to Coral Springs, west Fort Lauderdale, Hallandale Beach, Plantation, and Tamarac in Broward County and Boca Raton and West Palm Beach in Palm Beach County. The county had a net loss of about 36,000 people in 1992, while Broward and Palm Beach counties gained about 17,000 and 2,300 Miami-Dade County residents, respectively. By 2001, 230,710 people moved from Miami-Dade County to Broward County, while 29,125 Miami-Dade County residents moved to Palm Beach County. However, as Broward County became more crowded, 100,871 people relocated from Broward County to Palm Beach County. Consequently, the Hispanic population in south Miami-Dade County climbed rapidly. In Homestead, for example, the Latino population rose from 30% to 45% between 1990 and 2000.

=== Environmental aftermath ===
During the storm, a facility housing Burmese pythons was destroyed, allowing many of them to escape into the Everglades. Although Burmese pythons – native to Southeast Asia – had been sighted in Everglades National Park since the 1980s, the destruction of this facility contributed significantly to the establishment of breeding populations in Florida. Due to rapid reproduction and ability to prey on many species, the population of Burmese pythons has exploded, with possibly as many as 300,000 in the Everglades alone. Efforts have been made to curb the thriving population of these invasive snakes, including a ban on importation of the species to the United States since January 2012, the Florida Fish and Wildlife Conservation Commission in 2008 regulating that boa and python owners have permits and tag their snakes, and Burmese python hunting contests. In March 2017, the South Florida Water Management District (SFWMD) began its Python Elimination Program. Qualified individuals became authorized to capture Burmese pythons on SFWMD properties, with minimum wage pay as compensation and a bonus of $50 for a python at least 4 ft (1.2 m) in length, plus an additional $25 for every foot beyond 4 ft (1.2 m). Further, compensation was set at $200 for finding a nest with eggs. By May 2018, 1,000 Burmese pythons were captured through that program alone.

== See also ==
- Effects of Hurricane Andrew in The Bahamas
- List of Florida hurricanes (1975–1999)
