= August Geiger (architect) =

American architect

- Born: 1887; New Haven, Connecticut
- Died: 1968 (aged 80–81)
- Occupation: Architect
- Buildings: Dade County Courthouse; Miami City Hospital

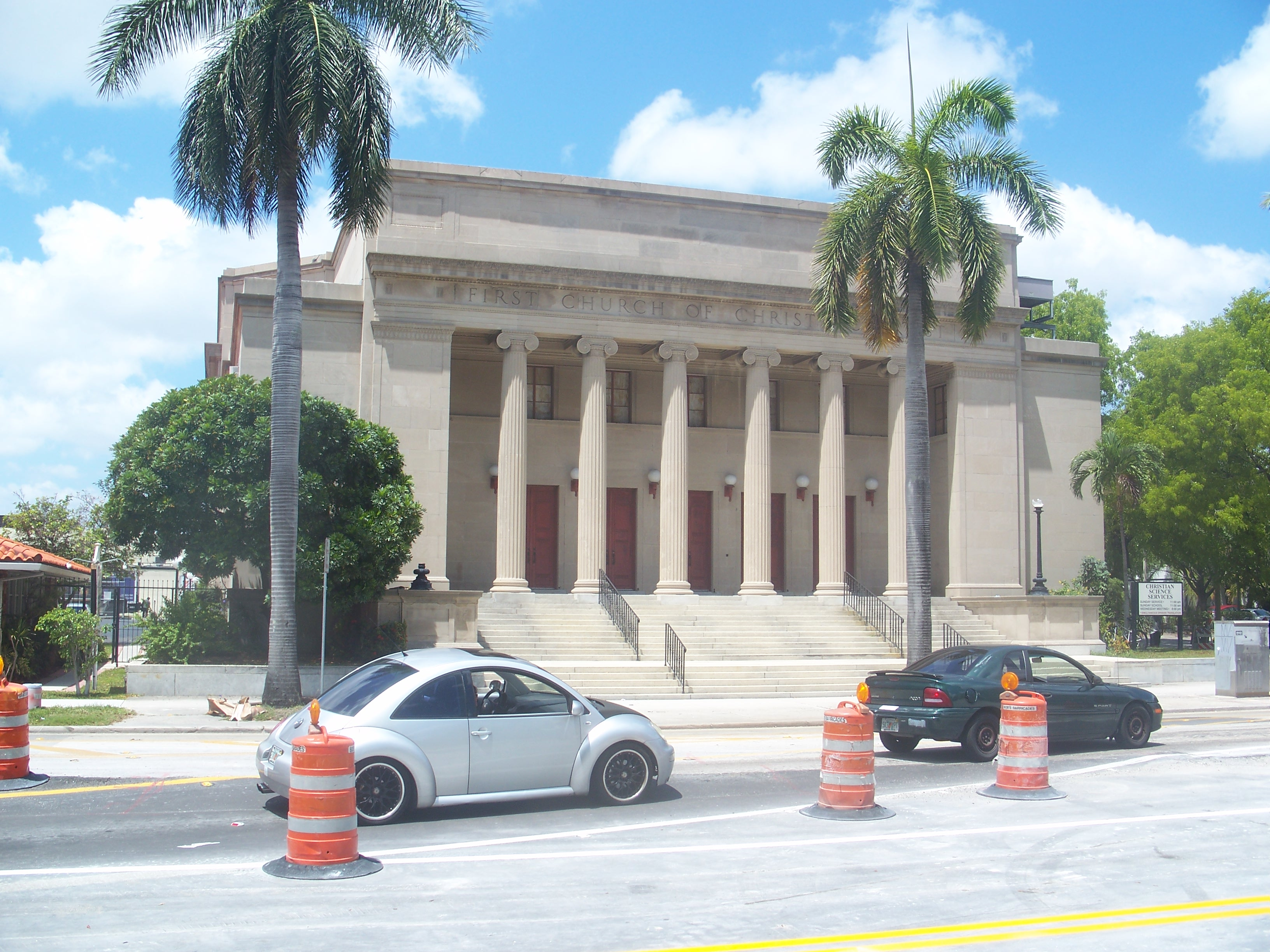
First Church of Christ, Scientist (Miami, Florida)

August Geiger (September 2, 1887 - 1968) was one of the most prominent American architects in South Florida from 1905 to the late 1940s. He experimented in Mission, Neo-Renaissance and Art Deco architecture, but is most noted for his works in the Mediterranean Revival style. A number of his works are listed on the U.S. National Register of Historic Places.

== Life ==
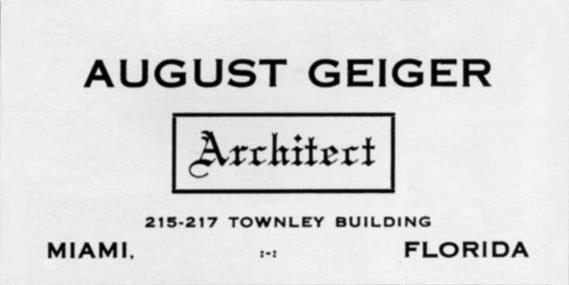
Geiger's notice for services

Geiger was born in New Haven, Connecticut, the son of Margaretha (Rettenmeyer) Geiger and Louis Geiger, a manufacturer of moldings and other fine woodwork for interior decoration. He was educated at the city's public schools, and completed his studies at Boardman's Manual Training School. Showing a talent for drawing and design, he determined to be an architect and secured a position in a New Haven firm. In 1905, Geiger moved to Miami, where he had vacationed with his family since around 1899, and worked at a local architectural firm for 6 years. The 10th registered architect in Florida, he opened his own firm in 1911, and in 1915 opened a second office in Palm Beach. He worked for Carl Fisher on various construction projects in Miami Beach, and was appointed architect for the Dade County School Board. In 1915 he married Ruth Hinson.

== Sample of projects ==
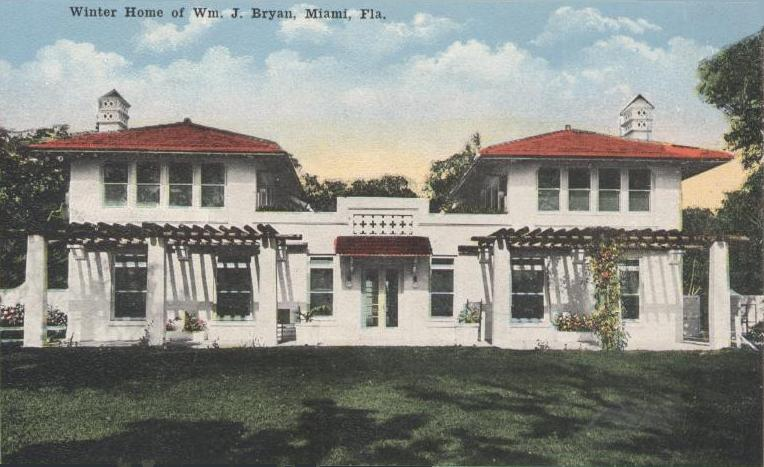
La Serena, 1913, built at Coconut Grove for William Jennings Bryan

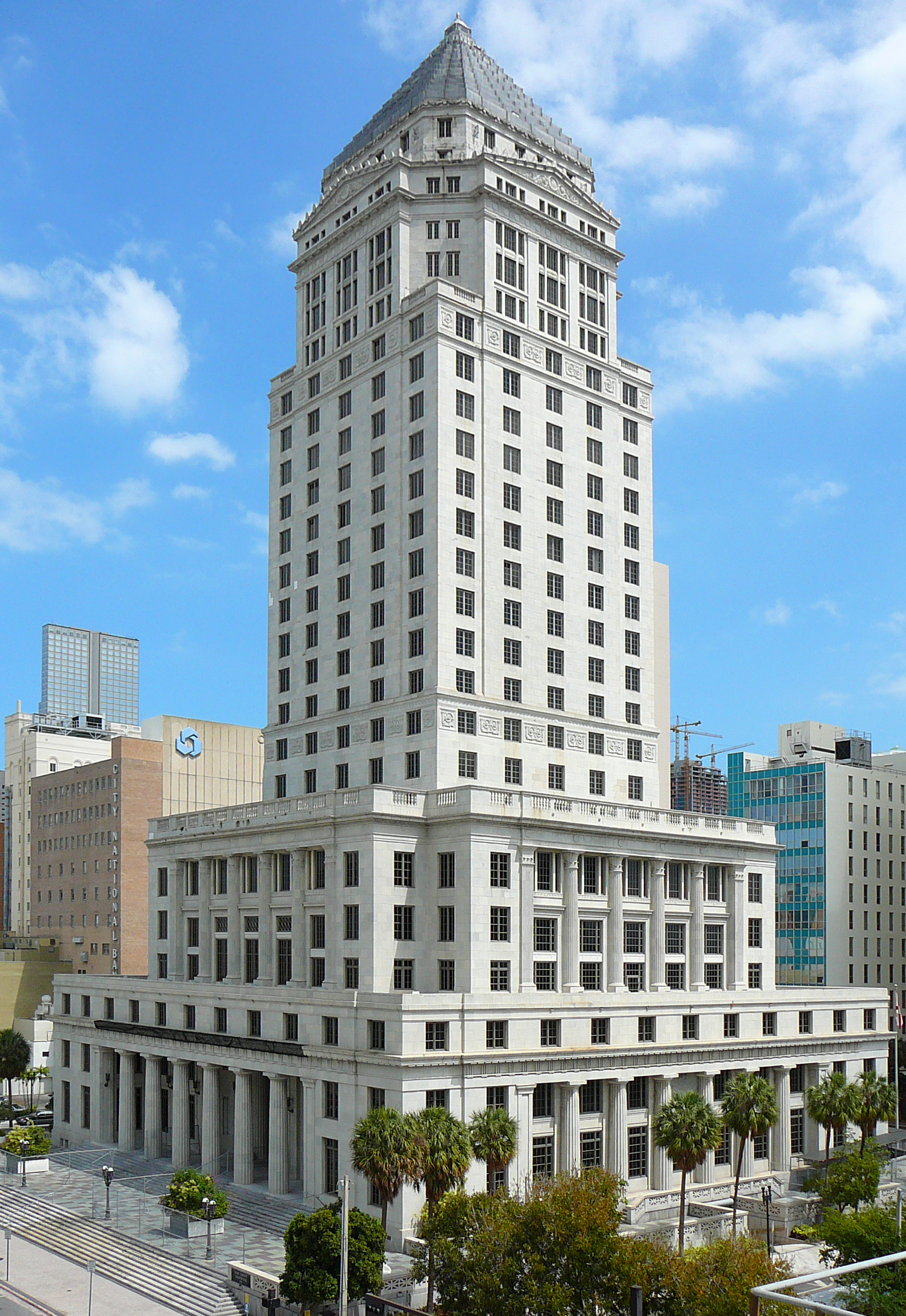
Dade County Courthouse, 1925

- Villa Serena (1913) in Coconut Grove, Miami, Florida
- Homestead Public School (also known as Neva Cooper School) (1914), in Homestead, Florida; listed in the National Register
- Southside School (1914), 45 S.W. 13th St., Miami, Florida, NRHP-listed
- Miami City Hospital, Building No. 1, (1915), 1611 NW 12th Ave., Miami, Florida, also called “The Alamo”—and now known as Jackson Memorial Hospital, (Geiger, August), NRHP-listed, (1916-1918)
- Miami Beach Municipal Golf Course House (1916), in Miami Beach, Florida
- Lincoln Hotel (1916), in Miami Beach, Florida (demolished)
- Alton Beach Water Tank, Miami Beach, Florida
- Fort Lauderdale Woman’s Club (1917) in Fort Lauderdale, Florida
- Davie School (1918), 6650 Griffin Rd., Davie, Florida, NRHP-listed
- Hindu Temple (1920) in Miami, Florida
- Fire Station No. 2 (1924), 1401 N. Miami Ave., Miami, Florida (Geiger, August C.), NRHP-listed
- St. Francis Hospital (Miami Beach, Florida) (1924) in Miami Beach, Florida. (demolished)
- Community Theater of Miami Beach (1924) on Lincoln Road, Miami Beach, Florida (demolished)
- Dade County Courthouse (1925) in Miami, Florida; listed in the National Register
- Carl Fisher Residence (1925) in Miami Beach, Florida
- Miami Women's Club (1925) 1737 N. Bayshore Dr., Miami, Florida; NRHP-listed
- First Church of Christ, Scientist (1925) in Miami, Florida
- Coral Way Elementary School (1936) Miami, Florida
- Ida M. Fisher Junior High School (1936), Miami Beach, Florida
- North Beach Elementary School (1936), Miami Beach, Florida
- Berghoff-Noll Residence (1936) in Fort Wayne, Indiana
- Chase Federal Bank (1937) Miami Beach, Florida
- Dade County Courthouse, 73 W. Flagler St., Miami, Florida (Geiger, August), NRHP-listed
- Homestead Public School-Neva King Cooper School, 520 N.W. First St., Homestead, Florida (Geiger, August), NRHP-listed
- One or more works in Boca Chita Key Historic District, NW section of Boca Chita Key, roughly bounded by Biscayne Bay and a stone wall Biscayne National Park, Florida (August Geiger Firm), NRHP-listed

== See also ==
- Southside School
- Dade County Courthouse
- First Church of Christ, Scientist
- Coral Way Elementary School
- Spanish Colonial style
- Spanish Colonial Revival Style architecture
