= Southside Elementary School =

Southside Elementary School may refer to:

- Southside Elementary School, Southside Alabama, Etowah County School District
- Southside Elementary School (Casa Grande, Arizona), one of Casa Grande's historic properties
- Southside School (Miami, Florida), also known as "Southside Elementary School", listed on the National Register of Historic Places
- Southside Elementary School, Buffalo, New York, Buffalo Public Schools
- Southside Elementary School, Dinwiddie, Virginia, Dinwiddie County Public Schools
- Southside Elementary School, Huntington, West Virginia, Cabell County Public Schools
