= Coral Way Bilingual K–8 Center =

Coordinates: 25°45′14.26″N 80°12′59.95″W

Coral Way School

Location
- 1950 SW 13th Ave; Miami, Florida 33145; United States

Information
- Type: Public
- Established: 1936
- School district: Miami-Dade County Public Schools
- Teaching staff: 84.00 (FTE)
- Grades: 1–8
- Enrollment: 1,327 (2017–18)
- Student to teacher ratio: 15.80
- Campus: Suburban
- Colors: Blue & Yellow
- Mascot: Chief
- Location: 1950 SW 13TH AVENUE MIAMI, FL 33145
- Telephone: (305)854-0515/ Fax: (305)285-9632

The Coral Way Bilingual K–8 Center, built as Coral Way Elementary School in 1936, is a K-8 school located in Miami, Florida, United States (US). The school was a pioneer of bilingual education in 1963, when it began teaching through the mediums of English and Spanish with two groups of students (English- and Spanish-speakers). In 2004, the school expanded to includes grades 7 and 8.

The school building was designed by August Geiger, a noted South Florida architect who worked for the Dade County School Board. The architecture is Mediterranean Revival style and was constructed under the auspices of the Works Projects Administration and completed in 1936.

On September 3, 1963, Coral Way Elementary opened its doors as the first publicly funded bilingual program in the US with students from two different native-language backgrounds. With funding from the Ford Foundation, school district leaders (Dr. Pauline Rojas, Dr. Joseph Hall, Dr. Rosa Inclán, Mr. Ralph Robinett), teachers, and paraprofessionals, which were referred to as "Cuban aides," implemented a bilingual curriculum where students were taught academic content through two languages.

The 1963 program began with about 350 grade 1–3 students, selected to maintain a balance of 50% English- and 50% Spanish-speakers. In the mornings, students were taught the curriculum in their native language (referred to as the "vernacular"). After midday, students transferred to classrooms in which the curriculum was taught through their second language. Reports indicated that both groups of students made academic progress in both languages without loss to their native language development. The 1963 Coral Way bilingual program had 7 initial goals, two of which related to second language acquisition. The remaining goals addressed long term outcomes such as cross-cultural understanding and positive contributions to society.

A 1973-1974 report by the Department of Program Evaluation for the Miami-Dade County Schools revealed that the students who attended the dual language programs continued to show progress on standardized testing [data source needed]. Dissertation data in 1968 from Dr. Mabel Wilson Richardson, a first grade teacher at the school in 1962, indicated similar findings. The success of the program paved the way for the Bilingual Education Act of 1968 and more than 3,000 two way immersion programs in the US by 2020.

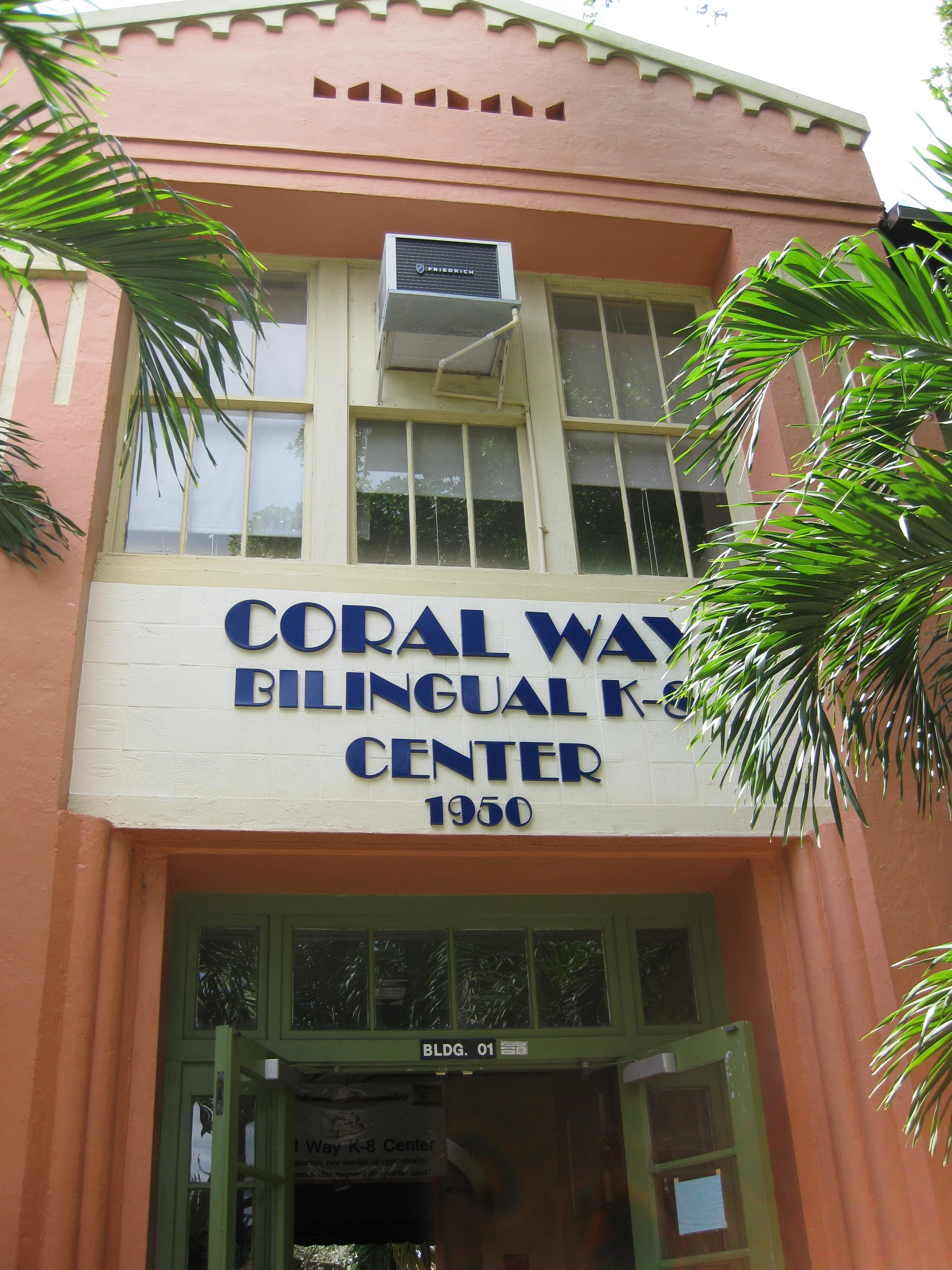
Coral Way Bilingual K-8 Center
