= First Church of Christ, Scientist (Miami) =

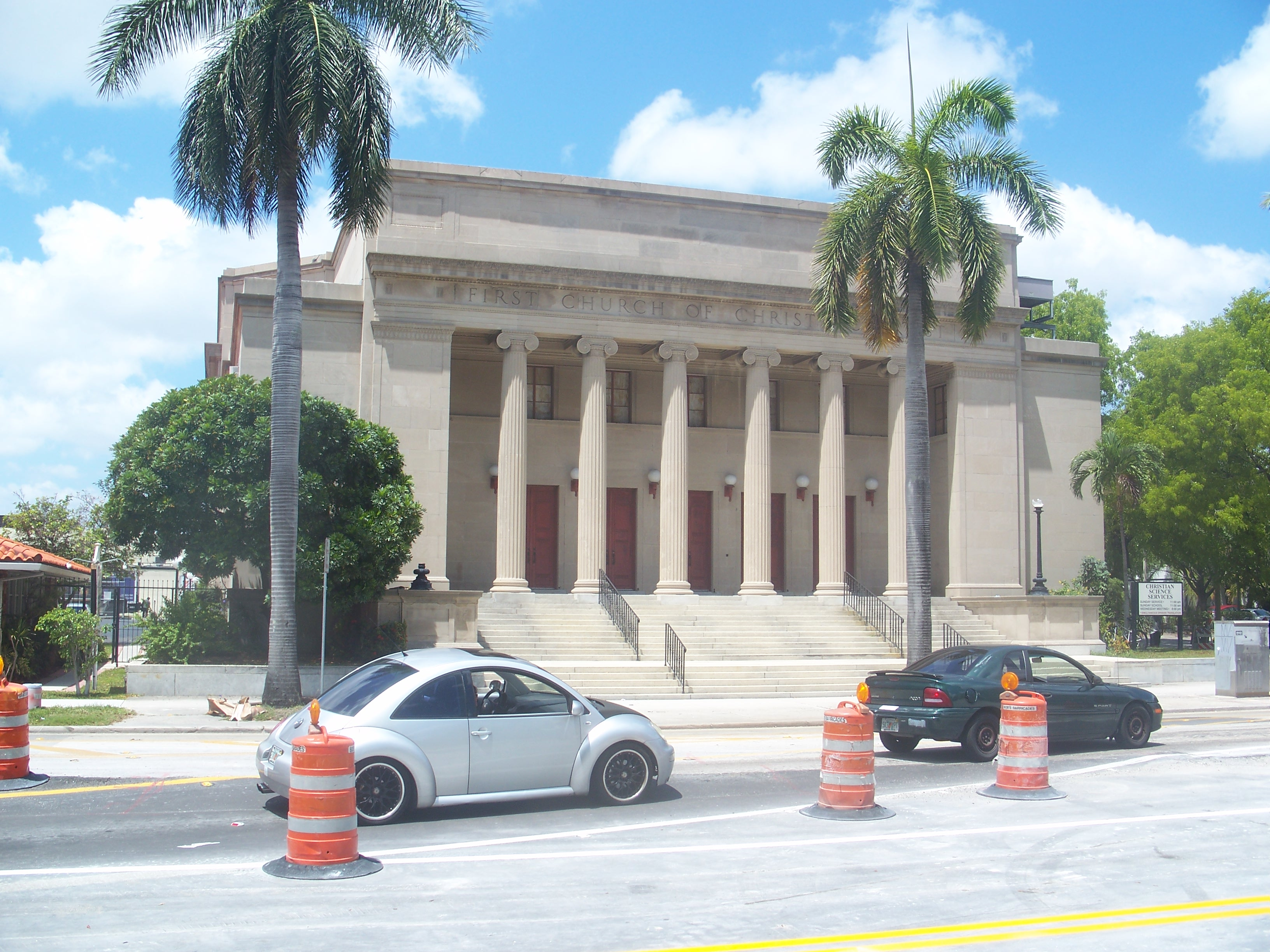

- 25°47′31″N 80°11′20″W
- Location: 1836 Biscayne Boulevard, Miami, Florida
- Country: United States of America

Architecture
- Style: Classical Revival
- Years built: 1925

First Church of Christ, Scientist is located in Miami, Florida. It is no longer a functioning Christian Science church, having been sold in 2013. The building was designed by August C. Geiger.

== Current status ==
First Church of Christ, Scientist, sold the building in 2013 for $6.25 million. It was resold in Nov. 2014 for $14.25 million. In September 2015, the current owner received the city's Urban Development Review Board's approval for use of the church building "for commercial uses, topped by a large garage next door to a brand new 38-story residential tower."

First Church of Christ, Scientist, Miami, now holds meetings in its reading room at 15 West Flagler Street in Miami.

== See also ==
- First Church of Christ, Scientist (disambiguation)
- List of former Christian Science churches, societies and buildings
