= Neva King Cooper Educational Center =

- Homestead Public School-Neva King Cooper School
- U.S. National Register of Historic Places
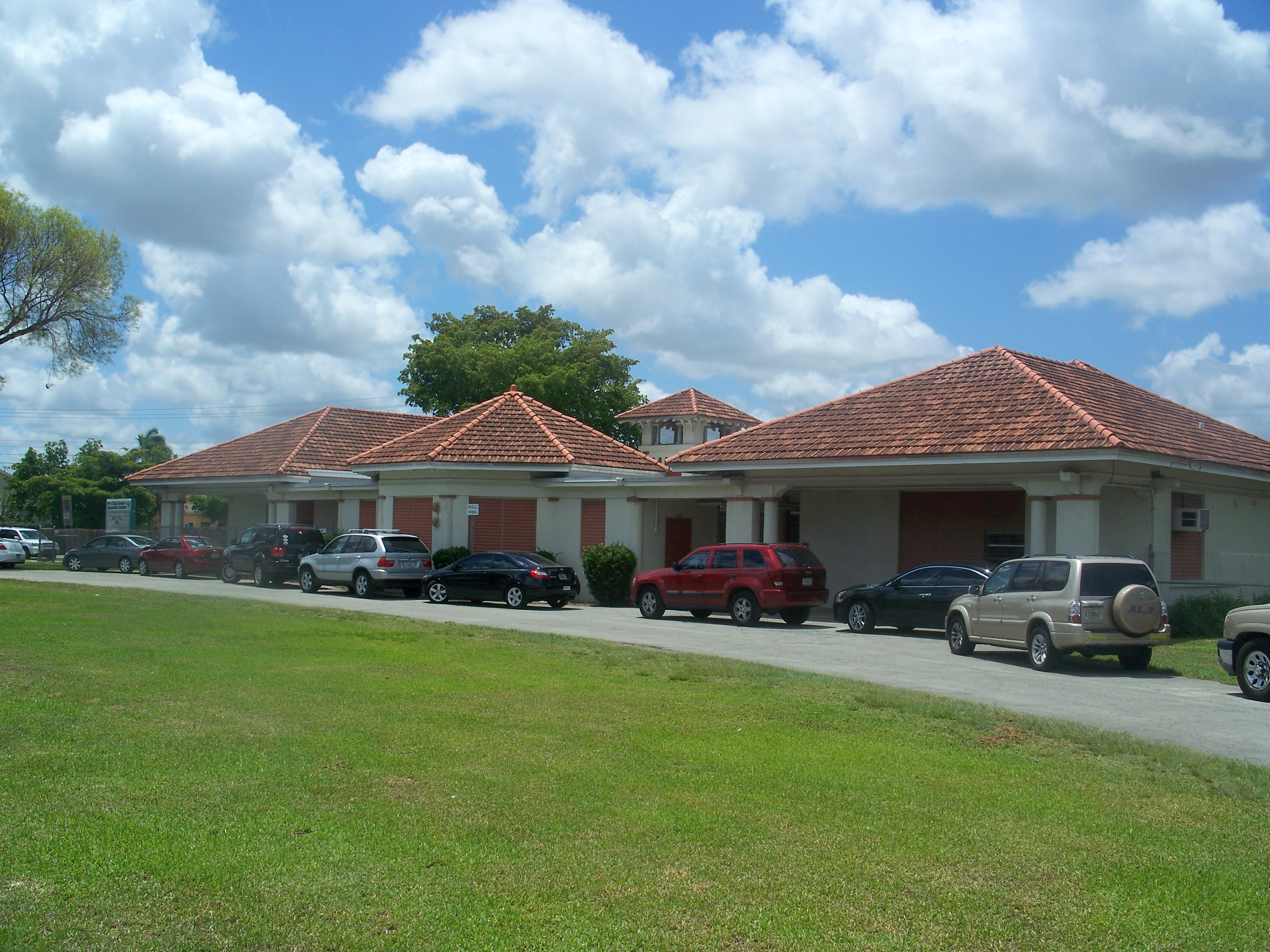

- Location within Florida Location within the United States
- Location: 151 NW 5th St., Homestead, Florida
- Coordinates: 25°28′29″N 80°28′48″W
- MPS: Homestead Multiple Property Submission
- NRHP reference No.: 85003112
- Added to NRHP: December 4, 1985

Location in south Florida

The Neva King Cooper Educational Center is a historic school in Homestead, Florida. It is part of the Miami-Dade County Public Schools district. The school serves students with mental disabilities.

The school was built in 1914 as the Homestead Public School and designed by August Geiger. In 1934 it was renamed the Neva King Cooper School. On December 4, 1985, it was added to the U.S. National Register of Historic Places. The property is part of the Homestead Multiple Property Submission, a Multiple Property Submission to the National Register.
