= Davie School =

- U.S. National Register of Historic Places
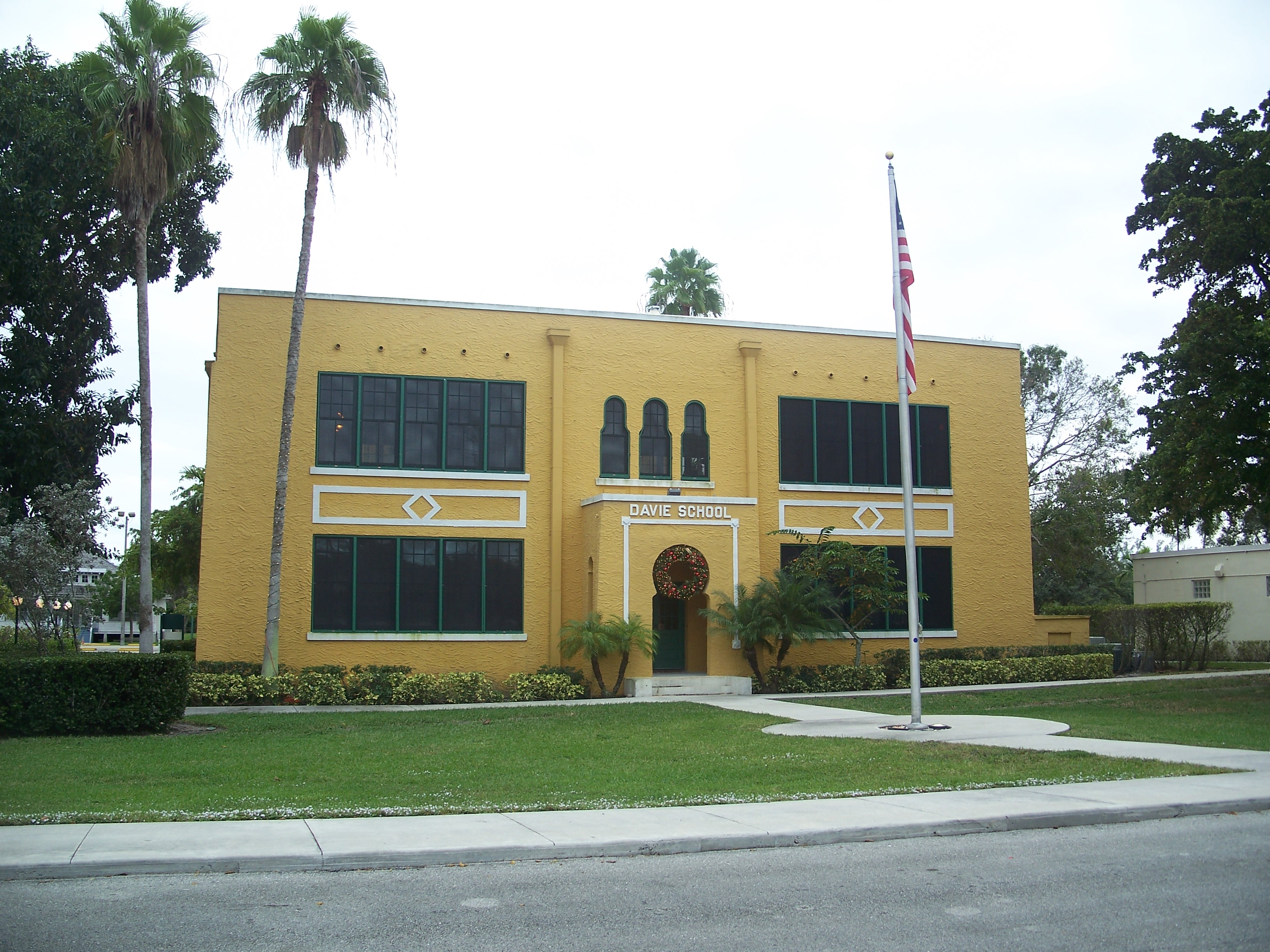

- Location within Florida Location within the United States
- Location: Davie, Florida
- Coordinates: 26°03′52″N 80°14′08″W
- Architect: August Geiger
- NRHP reference No.: 88000223
- Added to NRHP: 29 March 1988

The Davie School (also known as the Old Davie School) is a historic school in Davie, Florida, USA. It is located at 6650 Griffin Road. It was designed by August Geiger. It opened its doors in 1918 to 90 students, and was in continuous use as a school until 1978. On March 29, 1988, it was added to the U.S. National Register of Historic Places. It is the oldest extant school building in Broward County.

== School building ==
The architect Geiger was hired by the school board in 1917 and presented them with his plans for the school that September. It is a T-shaped two-story building constructed of concrete with a textured stucco finish. The building has a hip roof with a surrounding parapet. Architectural elements include horseshoe and bell-shaped openings, raised bands of stucco and multiple panel windows.

== History ==
Until the early 20th century, what is now Davie was considered an impenetrable swamp, accessible only by water. At first, school was held in a room at the general store along a canal, and in 1911, a two-room wooden structure was built for the growing population of Zona (what is now Davie). Built in 1917 it was the first permanent school in what had been The Everglades. The second floor auditorium was used for a variety of civic purposes. It functioned continuously as a school until 1979. In 1977 Davie built a new elementary school, the next year nearby students were taught there until the completion of Griffin Elementary School in 1979.

== Modern times ==
The city of Davie negotiated the purchase of the land around the schoolhouse from the Broward County School District in 1998, at that time the school building was being used as an event venue. In 2008 after being closed to the public for nearly 20 years the Davie school reopened as the Old Davie School Historical Museum, with exhibits about life and agriculture during the development of Davie in the 1920s. Adjacent to the school is the 1930s period Viele House, a historic house museum, and the Pioneer House, a replica of a 1908 early settler's shack.
