= Homestead Multiple Property Submission =

- U.S. National Register of Historic Places
- Location: Homestead, Miami-Dade County, Florida
- MPS
- NRHP reference No.: 64500110
- Added to NRHP: November 14, 1988

The following buildings were added to the National Register of Historic Places as part of the Homestead Multiple Property Submission (or MPS).

Resource Name	Also known as	Address	Added
Homestead Public School-Neva King Cooper School		520 Northwest 1st Street	December 4, 1985
McMinn-Horne House		25 Northeast 12th Street	August 30, 1996
Thomas Faust House		69 Northwest 4th Street	September 27, 1996
Fuchs Bakery		102 South Krome Street	November 15, 1996
Lindeman-Johnson House		906 North Krome Avenue	November 15, 1996
Homestead Town Hall	Redlands District Chamber of Commerce	43 North Krome Avenue	November 7, 1997

== Gallery ==
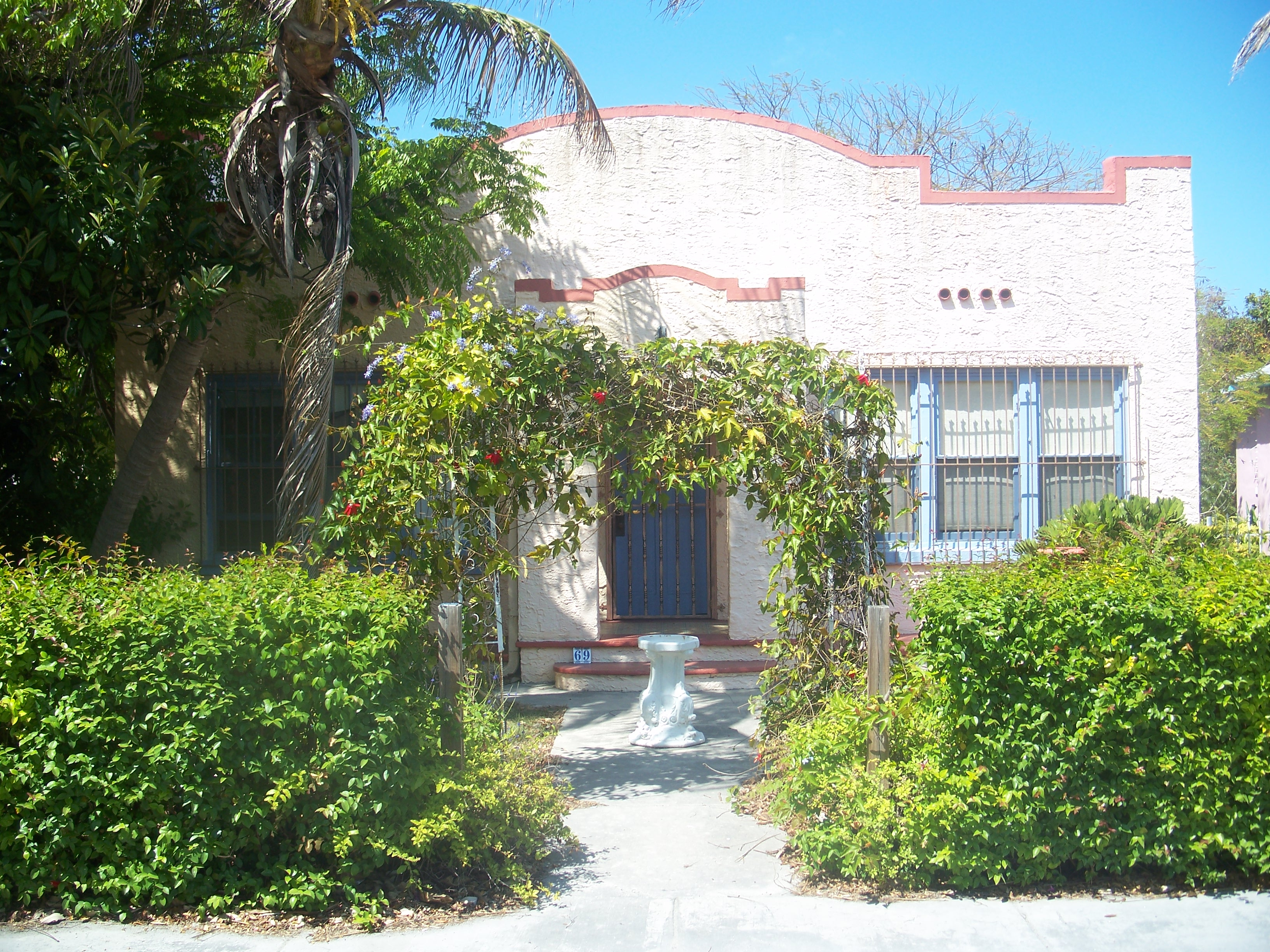
Thomas Faust House

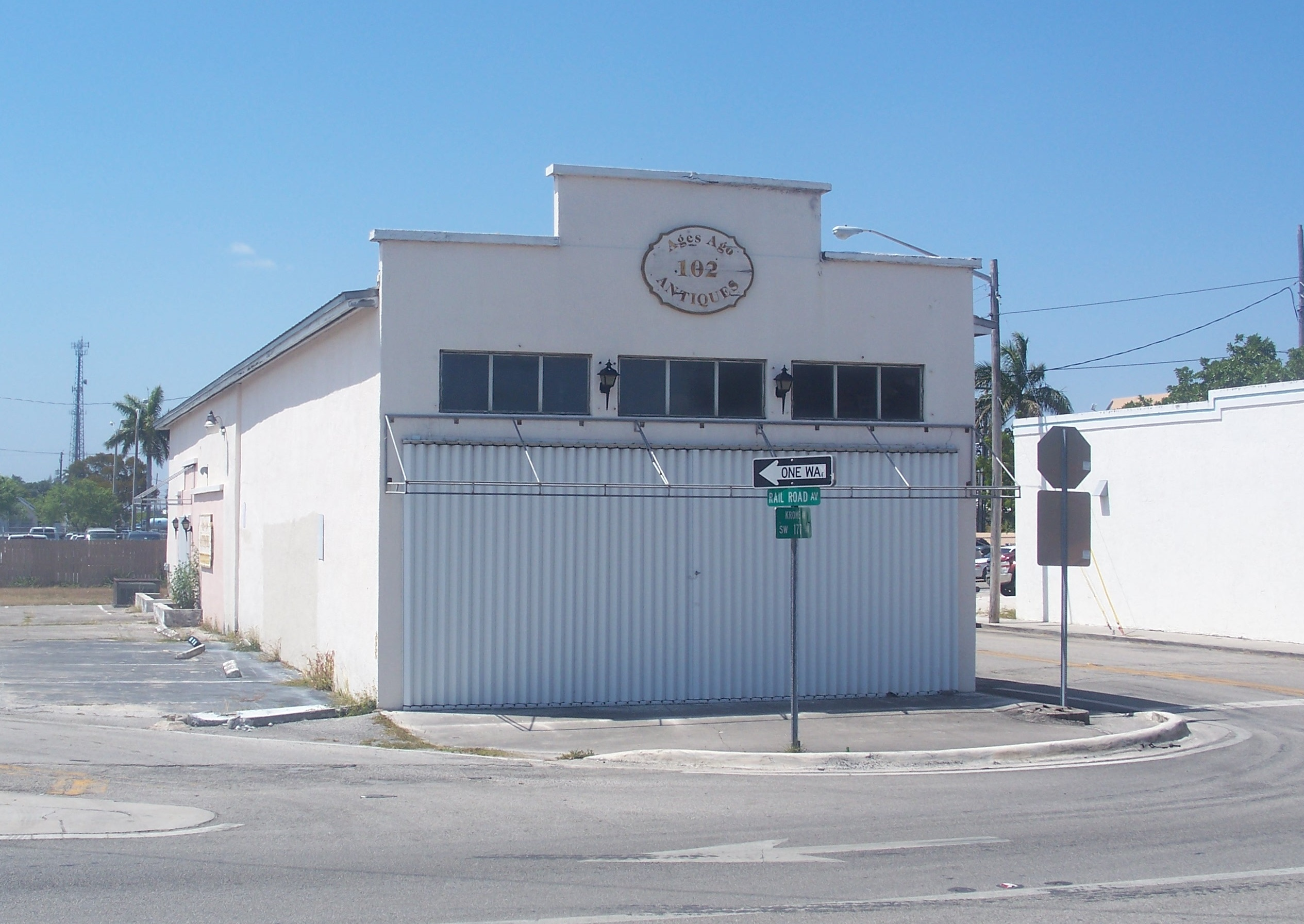
Fuchs Bakery

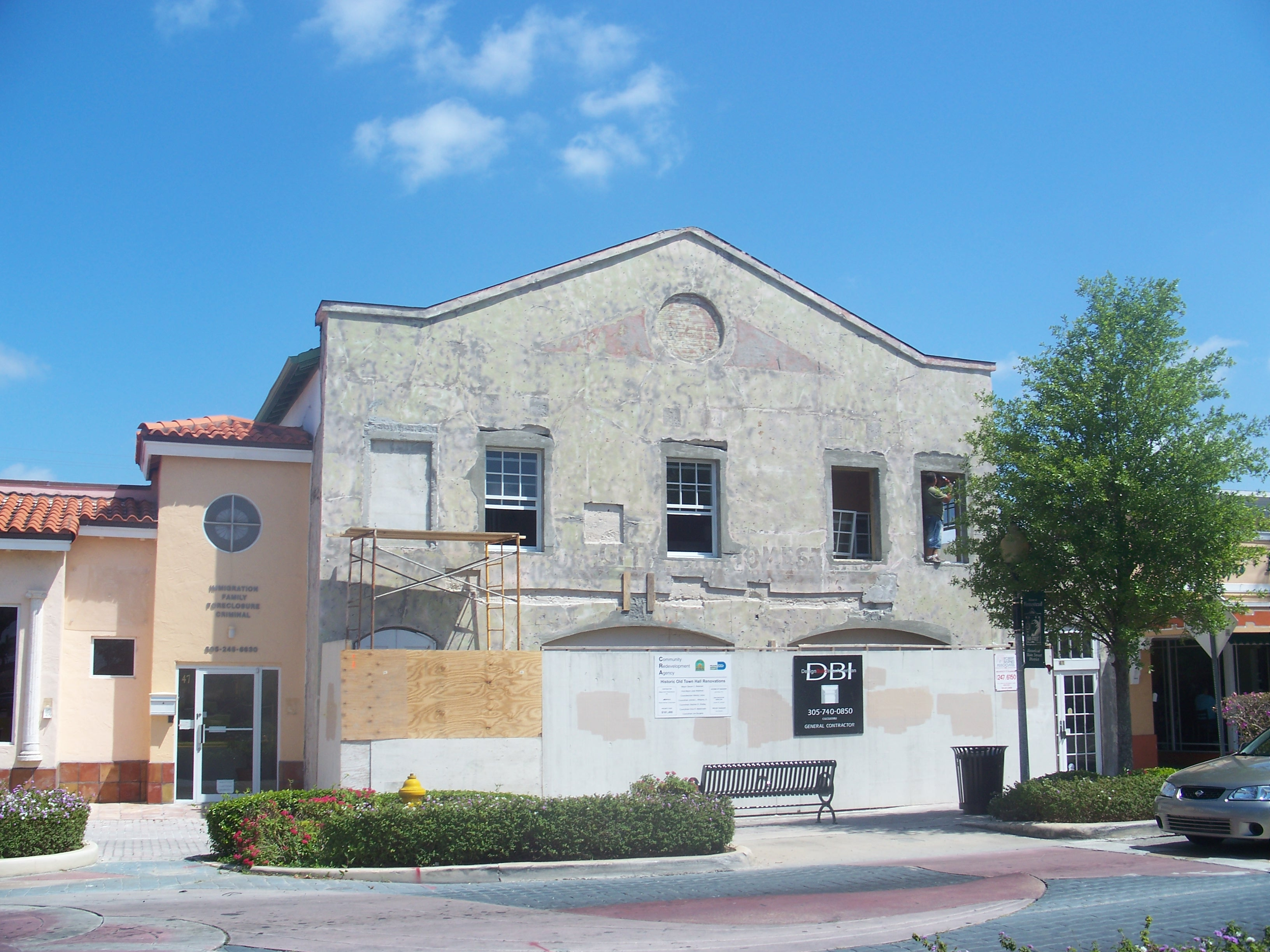
Homestead Town Hall

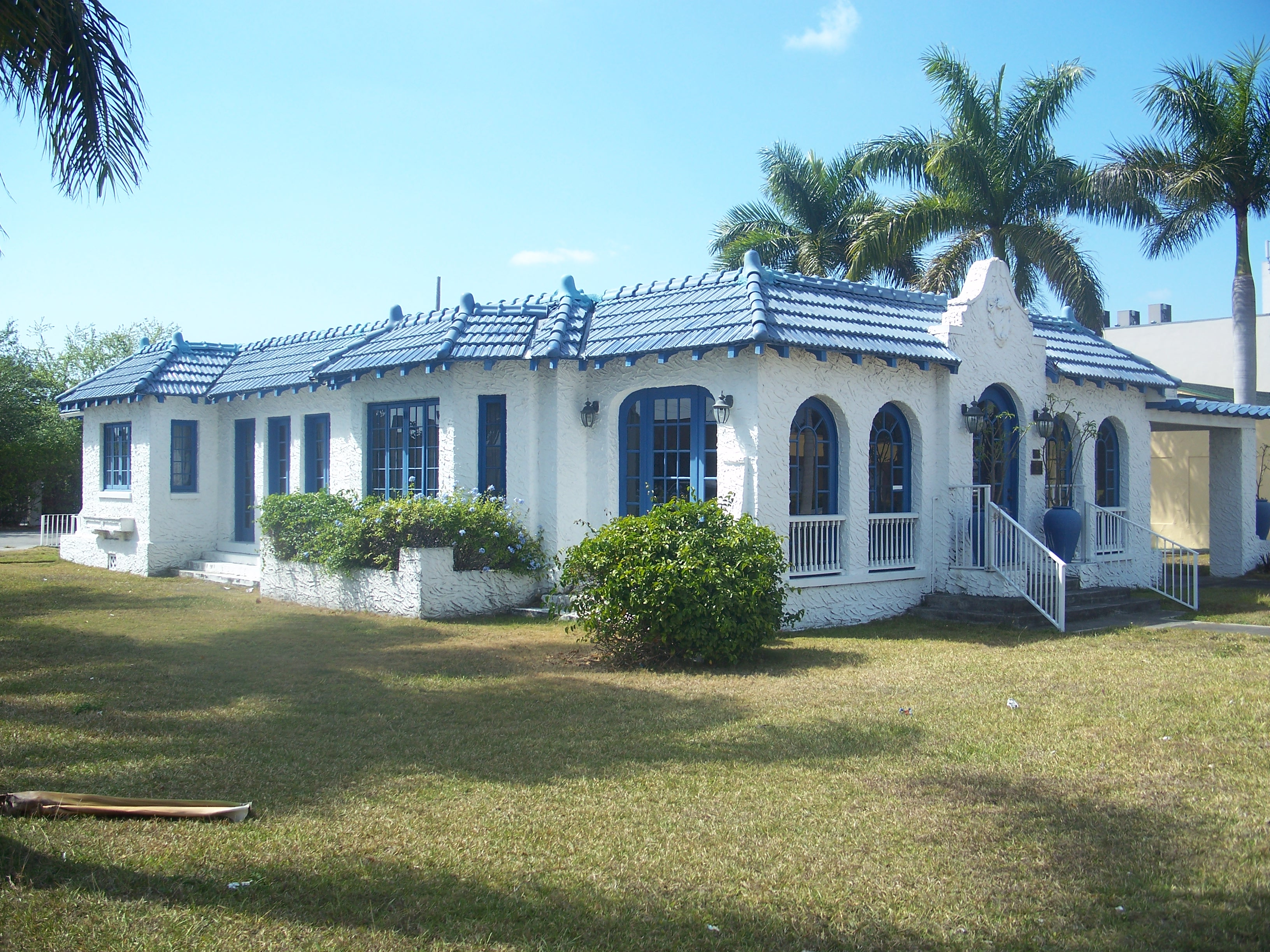
Lindeman-Johnson House

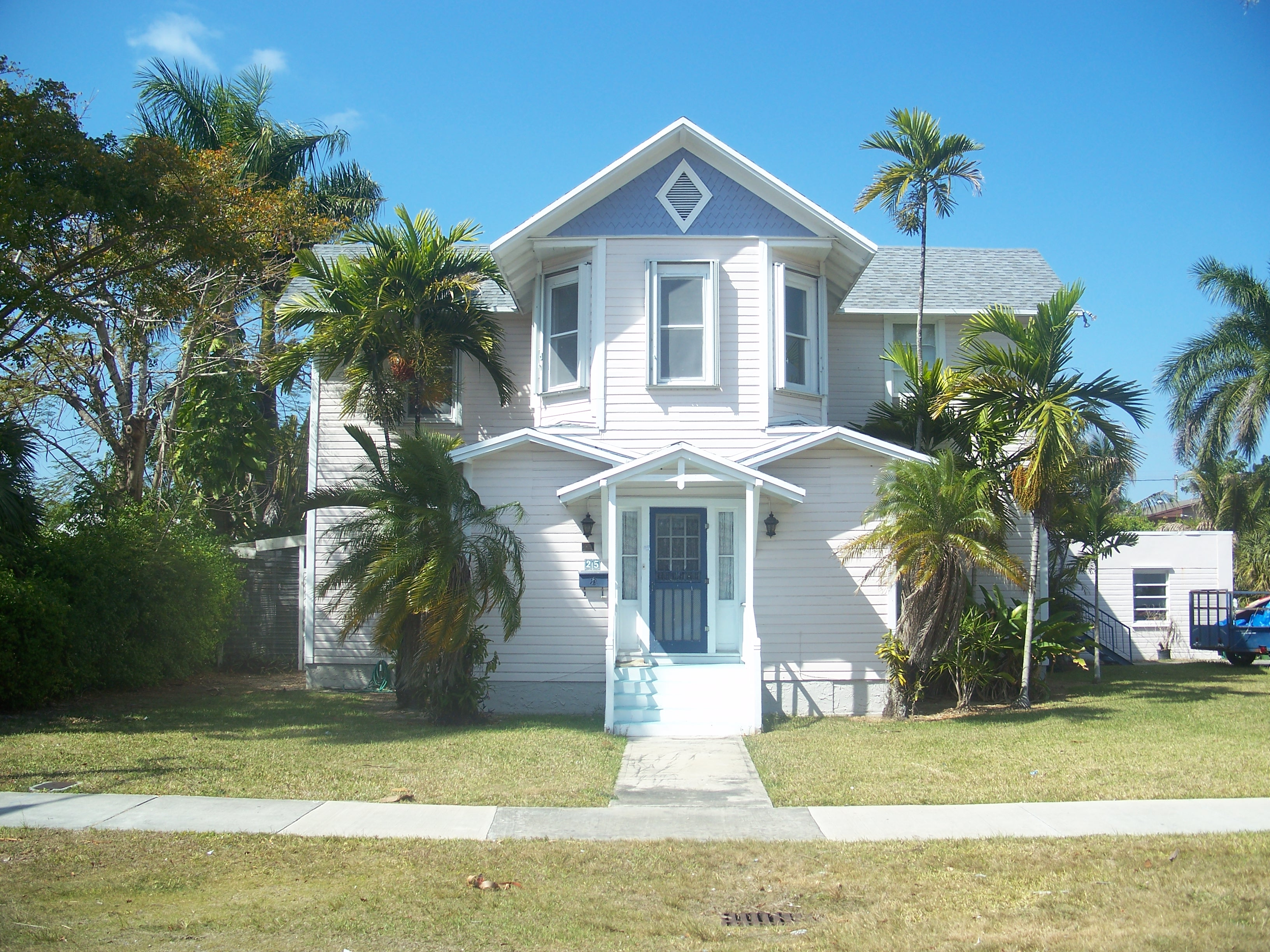
McMinn-Horne House

== See also ==
- National Register of Historic Places listings in Miami-Dade County, Florida
