= Fuchs Bakery =

- U.S. National Register of Historic Places
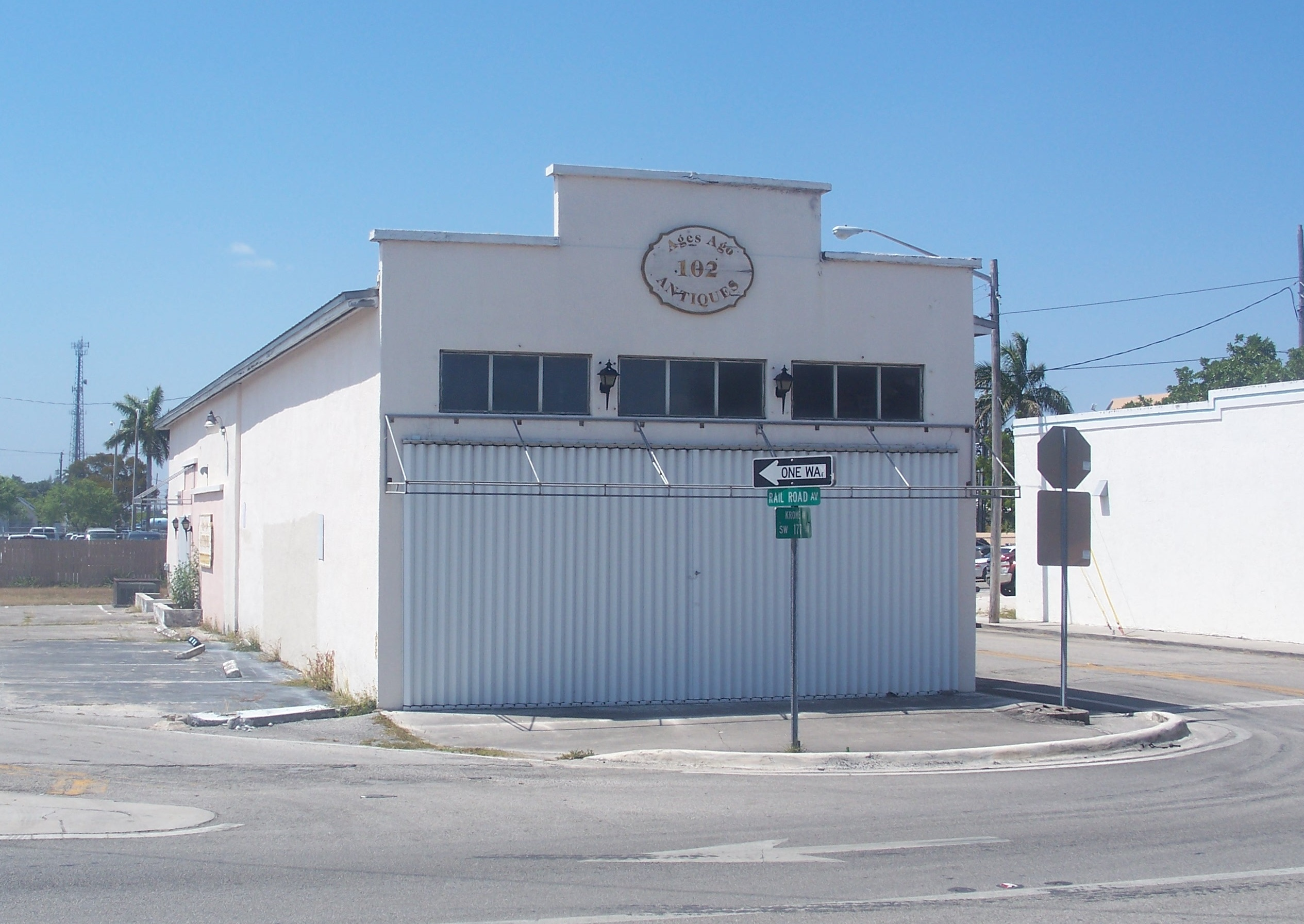

- Location within Florida Location within the United States
- Location: Homestead, Florida
- Coordinates: 25°28′7″N 80°28′42″W
- MPS: Homestead Multiple Property Submission
- NRHP reference No.: 96001335
- Added to NRHP: November 15, 1996

The Fuchs Bakery is a historic bakery in Homestead, Florida, United States. It is located at 102 South Krome Avenue. On November 15, 1996, it was added to the U.S. National Register of Historic Places.

This property is part of the Homestead Multiple Property Submission, a Multiple Property Submission to the National Register.

In late 2017 early 2018 the building was torn down to make way for a new cinema entertainment complex.
