= Homestead Town Hall =

- U.S. National Register of Historic Places
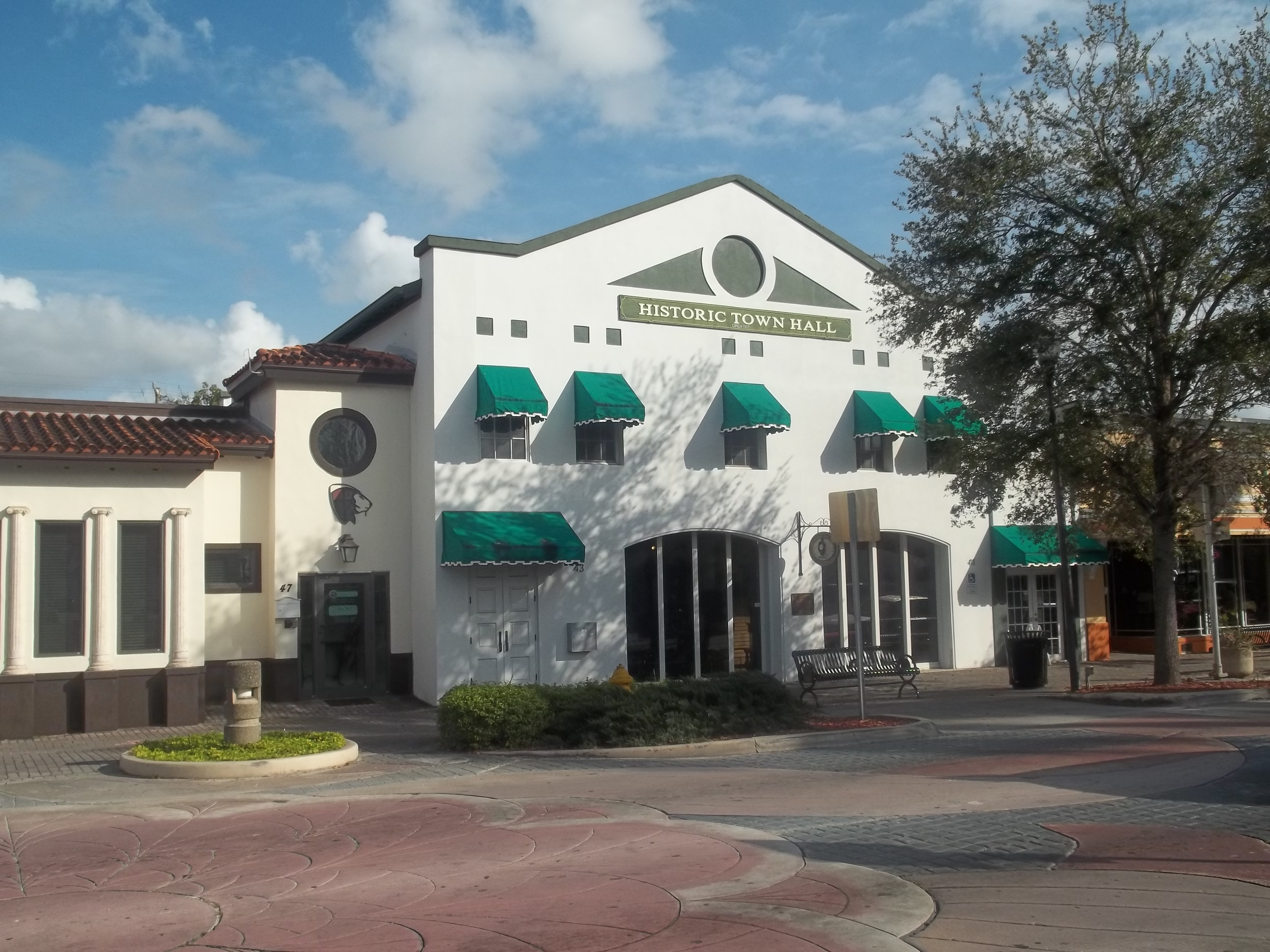

- Location within Florida Location within the United States
- Location: Homestead, Florida
- Coordinates: 25°28′9″N 80°28′39″W
- MPS: Homestead Multiple Property Submission
- NRHP reference No.: 97001327
- Added to NRHP: November 7, 1997

The Homestead Town Hall, also known as the Redlands District Chamber of Commerce, is the original town hall for the Town of Homestead, built in 1917 Homestead, Florida. It is located at 41 North Krome Avenue. On November 7, 1997, it was added to the U.S. National Register of Historic Places.

The building was originally two separate buildings that date to 1917 and 1924, which were subsequently connected. It was the first municipal building in Homestead. This property is part of the Homestead Multiple Property Submission.

The Historic Homestead Town Hall Museum is located in the Homestead Town Hall. The museum features photos, artifacts and films about the city's history.

== History and description ==
In 1913, Homestead, Florida, was incorporated. The city government hired architect H. Hastings Mundy to design a town hall, whose projects also included several schools and a church in Miami, some of which are listed on the National Register of Historic Places (NRHP). The Homestead Town Hall remains the only known commission for Mundy in the town. John F. Umphrey became the contractor after bidding slightly more than $4,000. He also had experience with building local structures. Umphrey and Mayor Russell F. Tatum signed the contractor in February 1917, which included a 90-day deadline. However, this project would not be finished until August.

Opening in 1917 at 43 Krome Avenue, the town hall is a two-story masonry vernacular-style structure containing approximately 7,000 square feet (650 m^{2}). Seven years later, the Redlands District Chamber of Commerce completed a second building adjacent to the town hall. A small structure, it is one-story in height and on a concrete foundation, while also featuring a flat roof. Thus, the town hall is sometimes referred to as the Redlands District Chamber of Commerce. At some point, the two separate buildings were connected. It was both Homestead's first town hall and first municipal building.

This structure remained Homestead's town hall until 1975, with a new city hall dedicated at 790 N. Homestead Boulevard on November 23. In 1980, local merchants lobbied for and the city council approved a plan to demolish the 1917 town hall in favor of more parking along Krome Avenue. However, strong opposition from the public, who collected about $61,000 to restore the building, and a state grant of $173,363 for the same purpose led to its demolition being canceled.

Major restoration work occurred to the building in 1991 and 1992. However, not long after, Hurricane Andrew devastated Homestead, including the Homestead Town Hall. The 1993 session of the Florida Legislature approved a bill for grants for 11 historic sites to repair damages from Andrew, with the Homestead Town Hall receiving $35,873. Repair work included the restoration of the ceiling and the replacement of the original trusses with Dade County pine. On November 7, 1997, the Homestead Town Hall was added to the NRHP. This property is part of the Homestead Multiple Property Submission, also known as the Historic Resources of Homestead, Florida.

Currently, the Historic Homestead Town Hall Museum is located in the Homestead Town Hall. The museum features photos, artifacts and films about the city's history.

== See also ==
- National Register of Historic Places listings in Miami-Dade County, Florida
