= Grand Prix of Miami =

Grand Prix of Miami may refer to several auto races in the Miami/South Florida metropolitan area:

- Miami Grand Prix, a series of Formula One races held in Miami Gardens since 2022
- Grand Prix of Miami (open wheel racing), a series races for open wheel racing cars held in the Miami area between 1985 and 2015
- Grand Prix of Miami (sports car racing), a series of sports car races held in the Miami area between 1983 and 2012
