= Southside School (Miami, Florida) =

- Southside Preparatory Academy (Southside Elementary School)
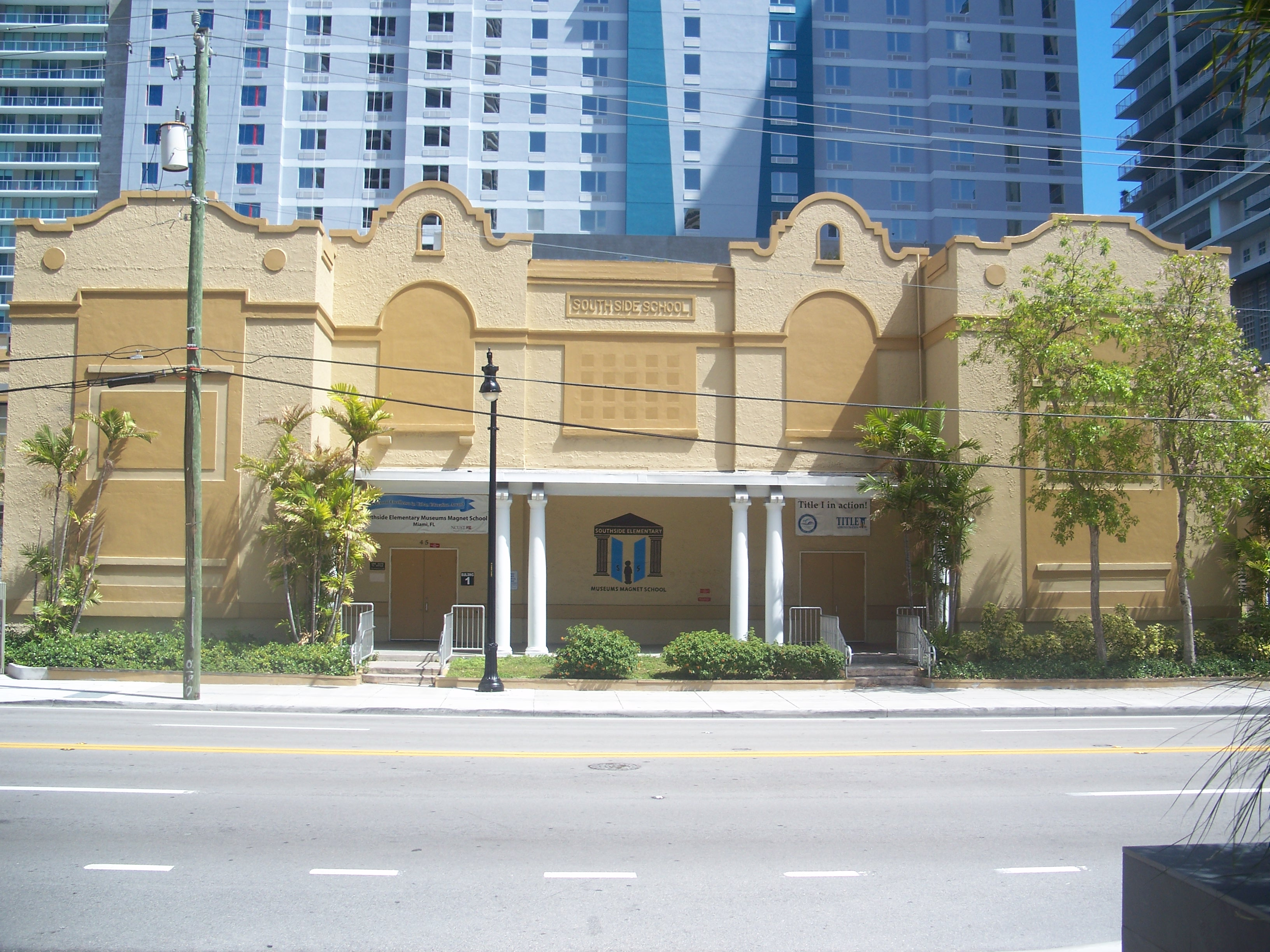

- Location within Miami Location within Florida Location within the United States
- Location: Miami, Florida
- Built: 1914

Southside Elementary School (now known as Southside Preparatory Academy) is a historic school that serves students in Pre-Kindergarten through 8th grade in Brickell in Downtown Miami, Florida. It is located at 45 Southwest 13th Street. On January 4, 1989, it was added to the U.S. National Register of Historic Places. Southside originally shared a schoolhouse building with Miami Senior High School, now located in Little Havana, Miami.

Southside is the oldest elementary school in Miami-Dade county. In August 2019, the school was renamed as Southside Preparatory Academy, and in the same year, opened its first class of 6th grade. In the 2025-2026 school year, they are set to open their new middle school building, which features housing for teachers in two of the floors, and the rest of the floors for the school. The school offers a variety of sports and activities for their students. It partners with Miami Science Museum and Lowe Art Museum. One famous alumna is Ileana Ros-Lehtinen, and another was Louis Gualda (a.k.a. Tony Knight, Cuban-American Actor). Southside School is served by the Miami Metrorail at the Brickell Station and by the Metromover.
