= Boca Chita Key Historic District =

Historic district in Florida, United States

- U.S. National Register of Historic Places
- U.S. Historic district
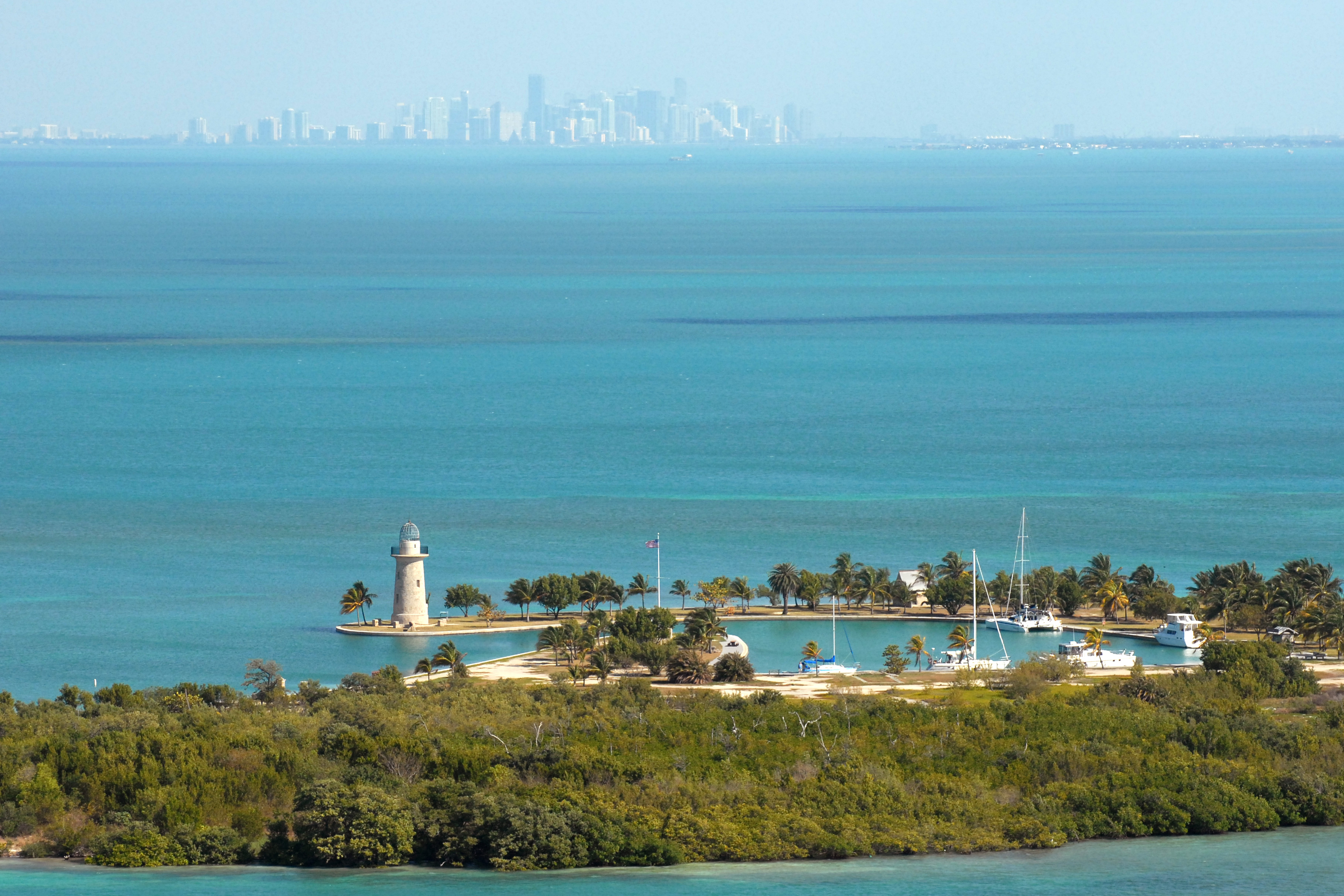
- Boca Chita Historic District with Miami skyline in background

- Location within Florida Location within the United States
- Location: Miami-Dade County, Florida, United States
- Nearest city: Homestead
- Coordinates: 25.523099°N 80.174639°W
- Area: 110 acres (0.45 km^{2})
- Built: Dee Rivers the son of Georgia's governor Ed Rivers and owner of WEDR and Rivers Radio owned the island from 1950 to 1984
- NRHP reference No.: 97000795
- Added to NRHP: August 1, 1997

The Boca Chita Key Historic District is a U.S. historic district within the Biscayne National Park in Miami-Dade County, Homestead, Florida. Located on the northwest section of Boca Chita Key, delimited by Biscayne Bay in the north and west and a half ruined stone wall on its southern side, it contains three historic buildings and the Boca Chita Lighthouse. On 1 August 1997, it was listed in the National Register of Historic Places for its architectural, historical and recreational values.

== Location ==
Boca Chita Key Historic District covers an area of 110 acres (45 ha) within the larger Biscayne National Park of 180,000 acres (73,000 ha) area. It is bounded on the southern and western border by the Biscayne Bay and the remnant of a stone wall.

== History ==
Mark C. Honeywell, a wealthy industrialist and his wife who owned the island off their house in the Miami beach, built the structures as part of his development plan after he bought the island in 1937, and built up the structures between 1937 and 1940.; however, the building built between 1937 and 1939 do not exist now. The Honeywells built it as their holiday resort. They built many structures which included a chapel, a lighthouse, a pavilion for holding picnic, a generator room, and also a garage. An arch bridge was also built across an existing canal. The August Geiger Firm were the architects and builders of the structures, which were built in modern architectural style with use of limestone, concrete and asphalt. The retreat was a popular venue for holding parties when Honeywells and their guests crossed over to the island from the Miami beach in luxury vessels. On such occasions, a cannon located near the lighthouse on the harbour was fired as a welcome gesture to the guests.

After his wife's death, Honeywell's interest in the island waned. He got married again to Eugenia Hubbard and then sold the island to Florence Emerman in 1942.

The structures were built with Miami oolite limestone, and even in the existing structures the external faces have a quarry finish, typical of the area.

== Historic structures ==
Some of the historic structures are the lighthouse, the chapel and the open air picnic pavilion. Also notable are the stone wall and the cannon.

=== Lighthouse ===
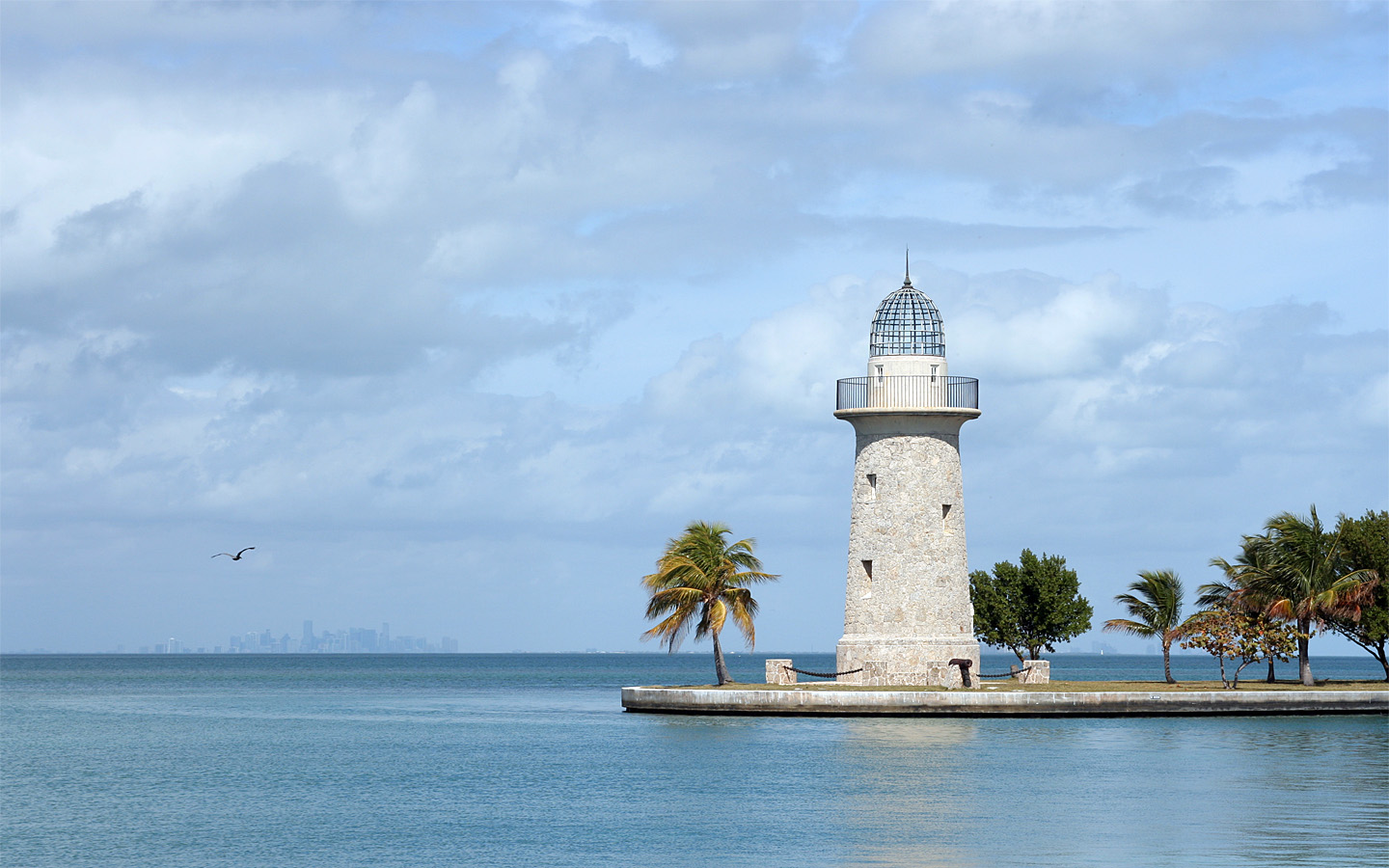
Boca Chita Lighthouse

The island's 65-foot lighthouse was built by Mark C. Honeywell in 1938. Built at the north end of the harbour, in a tapered shape with “concrete bricks laid in common bond with the exterior clad in uncoursed limestone.” At the base the tower is 21 feet (6.4 m) in diameter and is founded on a 28 feet (8.5 m) square concrete base. The observation deck has protective rails painted in white paint, The dome fitted with the lantern light is steel frame cage. The entrance door has a stone projection. There is a circular staircase which is cantilevered from the wall of the tower. The owner of the island had built it with the objective of using it as a navigation guide for his business operations on the island. However, a few hours after the lighthouse was lighted and commissioned, it had to close down, as Honeywell had failed to inform and obtain permission of the U.S. Coast Guard, the Lighthouse Service authorities, about the purpose of his project. The U.S. Coast Guard considered it a navigation hazard as it was not charted. During Hurricane Andrew in 1992, the windows of the lighthouse were damaged and were replaced with funds provided by a friend of Honeywell. The dome of the lighthouse was also under repairs since July 2013 (damaged panels) and was expected to be ready by end of August 2013. The repairs to the lighthouse involved up-gradation with Hurricane-proof glass for the dome, apart from repairs and providing new vents for ventilation. Painting of the entire structure was also on the anvil.

As the lighthouse is not functional it can be visited (during September to May and some days during the summer months) only when the park staff or volunteers are available there. The top deck of the lighthouse provides scenic views of the bay, ocean, Miami, Key Biscayne, and the sky line of the Miami Beach.

=== The chapel ===
The chapel is concrete structure of 12 by 20 feet (3.7 by 6.1 m) size built with uncoursed stone. It has a concave shaped roof with a steep slope The roof covering is made of asphalt shingles. Entrance doors are provided on the walls on northern and eastern sides. The southern door is flanked by a low level wall which is curved. Two identical openings are provided on the walls.

=== Picnic Pavilion ===
The picnic pavilion is an open-air structure which is located across the lighthouse. It is founded on a concrete raft as base which measures 15 by 52 feet (4.6 by 15.8 m). Above the concrete rafts ten square piers are raised along the longer length of the pavilion. The cornice and frieze are supported by the piers and above this is the roof in a hip shape covered with asphalt shingles.

=== Cannon ===
A cannon is also one of the historic objects. It is located on the northeastern part of the key near the lighthouse. The gun's trunnions are fitted on either side of the cannon over the base which is an inclined with indentures. The cannon is rusted.

=== Stone wall ===
The stone wall was built with limestone on reinforced cement concrete foundation. The Honeywells built it to enclose the structures that were originally built in the Boca Chita area. The wall was built in several stretches. The first stretch was for 400 feet (120 m) from the Biscayne Bay to the south of the picnic. It then turned for a length of 35 feet (11 m) in curved alignment from t where it was extended to the west for further 309 feet (94 m). The next orientation of the wall was to then turned north for a length 155 feet (47 m) and ending close to the engine house. Initially the wall had seven gate at different locations of which there only three are extant; two gates, each of 19 feet (5.8 m) width, have high gate posts. The third gate 4 feet (1.2 m) in width has an arched opening. Hurricane Andrew destroyed the eastern two-thirds part of this wall, stone gate house and gate posts. The remaining one third of the wall has the arched opening.
