= G. Carl Adams House =

- U.S. National Register of Historic Places
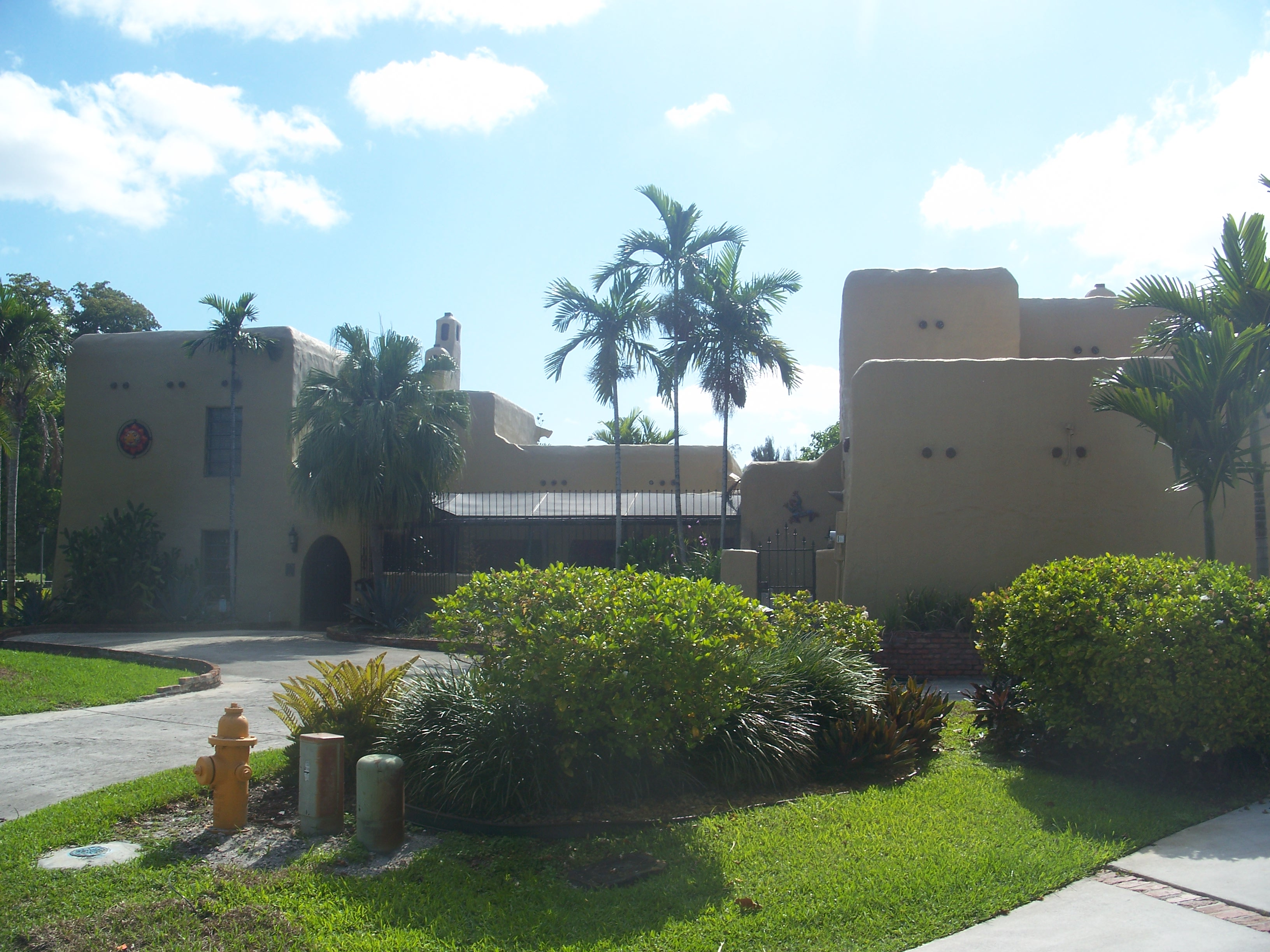

- Location within Miami Location within Florida Location within the United States
- Location: Miami Springs, Florida
- Coordinates: 25°48′54″N 80°17′48″W
- Built: 1924
- Architectural style: Pueblo Revival
- Restored by: Molina Family
- MPS: Country Club Estates TR
- NRHP reference No.: 85003464
- Added to NRHP: 1 November 1985

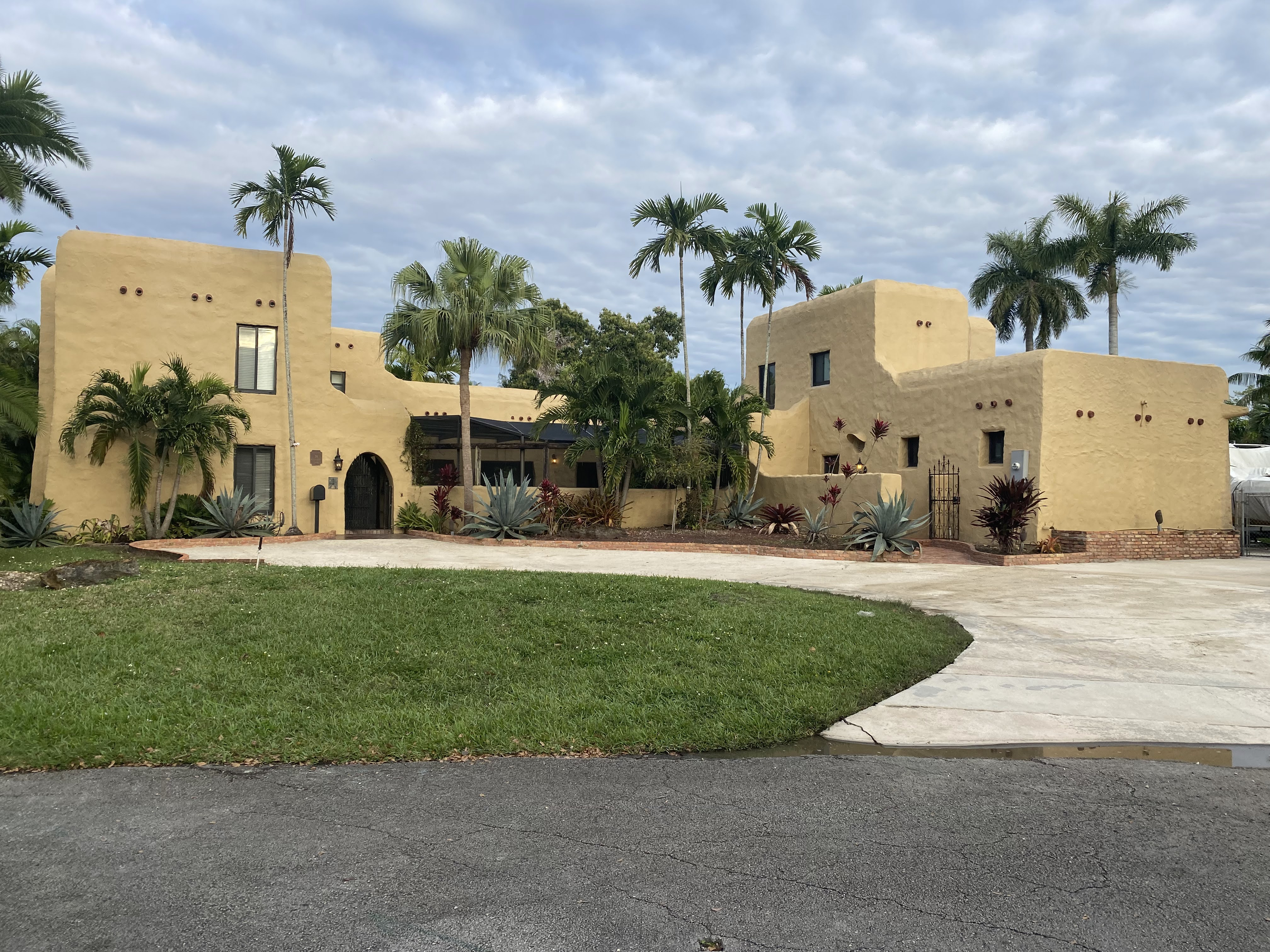
View of the G. Carl Adams House today.

The G. Carl Adams House is a historic home in Miami Springs, Florida. It is located at 31 Hunting Lodge Court. On November 1, 1985, it was added to the U.S. National Register of Historic Places. It is a work of Curtiss & Bright.

This home, built around 1924–1925 in the "Hunting Lodge Park" section of Country Club Estates (today Miami Springs, FL). Miami Springs City website shows that the house was built in 1925; however, Miami-Dade County records show it being built in 1924.

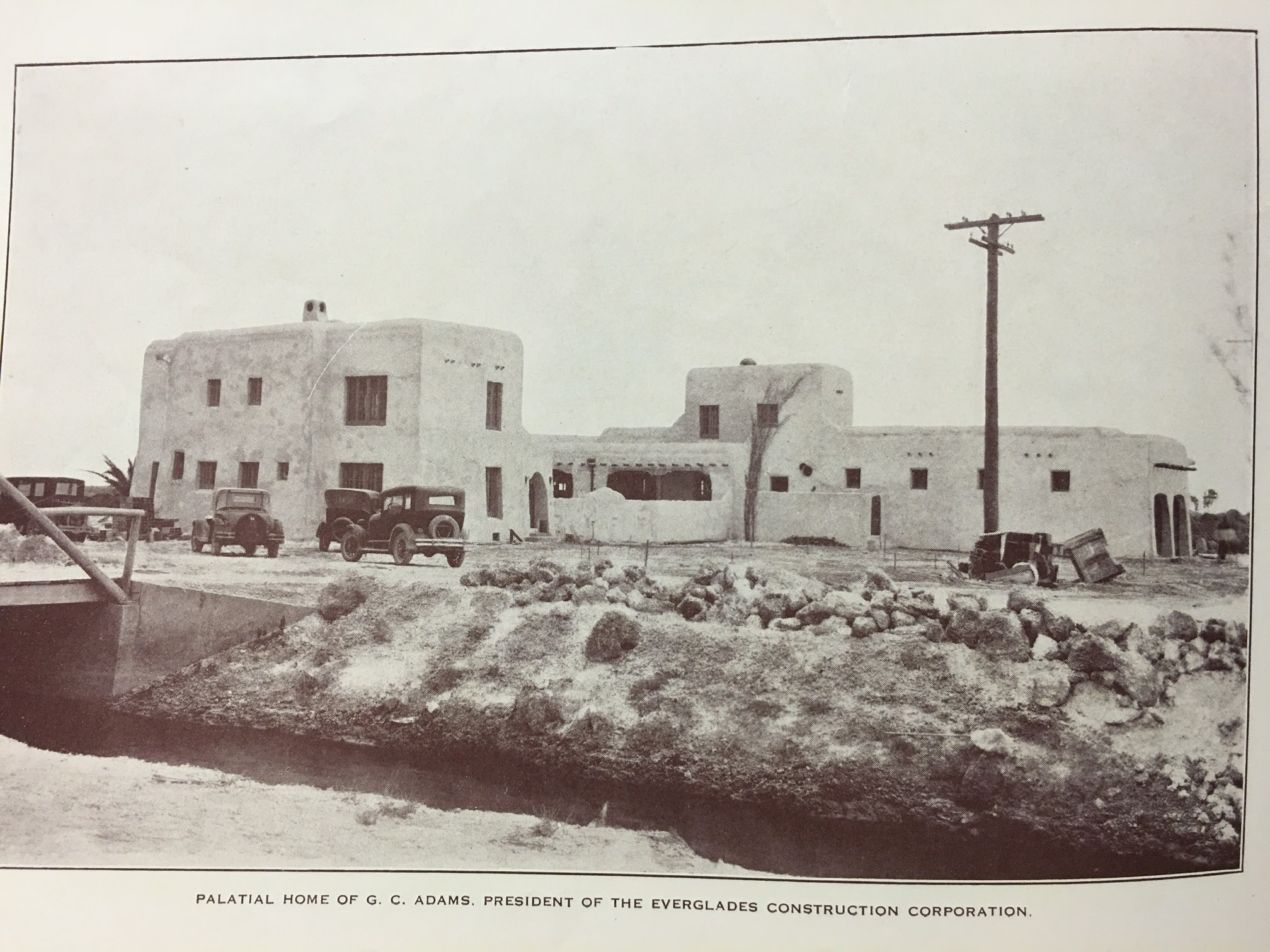
Palatial Home Of G. C. Adams. President Of The Everglades Construction Corporation

It was and is currently among the largest residences in the area at the time and was prominently featured in the development's sales brochures. The design is believed to be the work of Martin Luther Hampton, a well-known architect of the period. Hampton's portfolio includes notable projects like the Curtiss Mansion and the Lua Curtiss House #1 and #2 (both built for his mother).

George Carl Adams and his wife Dorothy were the original occupants of the home. George Adams was the half-brother of aviation pioneer Glenn Curtiss, and the two partnered in several real estate and business ventures. These ventures included the Florida Ranch and Dairy Corporation and the Everglades Construction Company, which was responsible for building the streets and sidewalks in Opa-locka, Hialeah, and Country Club Estates.

The G. Carl Adams House is a prominent two-story structure, arranged in a modified U-shape that wraps around a brick-paved central courtyard, bordered by a breezeway with graceful arched openings. The property is enclosed by a four-foot stucco wall, reflecting the Pueblo Revival style with its distinct hand-sculpted aesthetic. Architectural features such as buttresses, water spouts, and dark-stained wooden details, along with irregular parapet walls, contribute to its unique character. The building's flat roofs and deeply recessed windows, set into thick, roughly textured walls, define its exterior. From the rear, the home's terraced, multi-level design stands out, especially when viewed from the adjacent golf course. While a modern pool has been added, the house remains a leading example of Pueblo Revival architecture in the area.
