= Millard House =

Millard House may refer to the following:

- George Madison Millard House, Highland Park, Illinois; designed 1906
- Millard House (Pasadena, California); designed 1923
- Sylvester Millard House, Highland Park, Illinois; designed 1893

== See also ==
- Brandeis–Millard House, Omaha, Nebraska
- Millard–McCarty House, Miami Springs, Florida
- Millard–Souther–Green House, Stoneham, Massachusetts
