= Clune Building =

- U.S. National Register of Historic Places
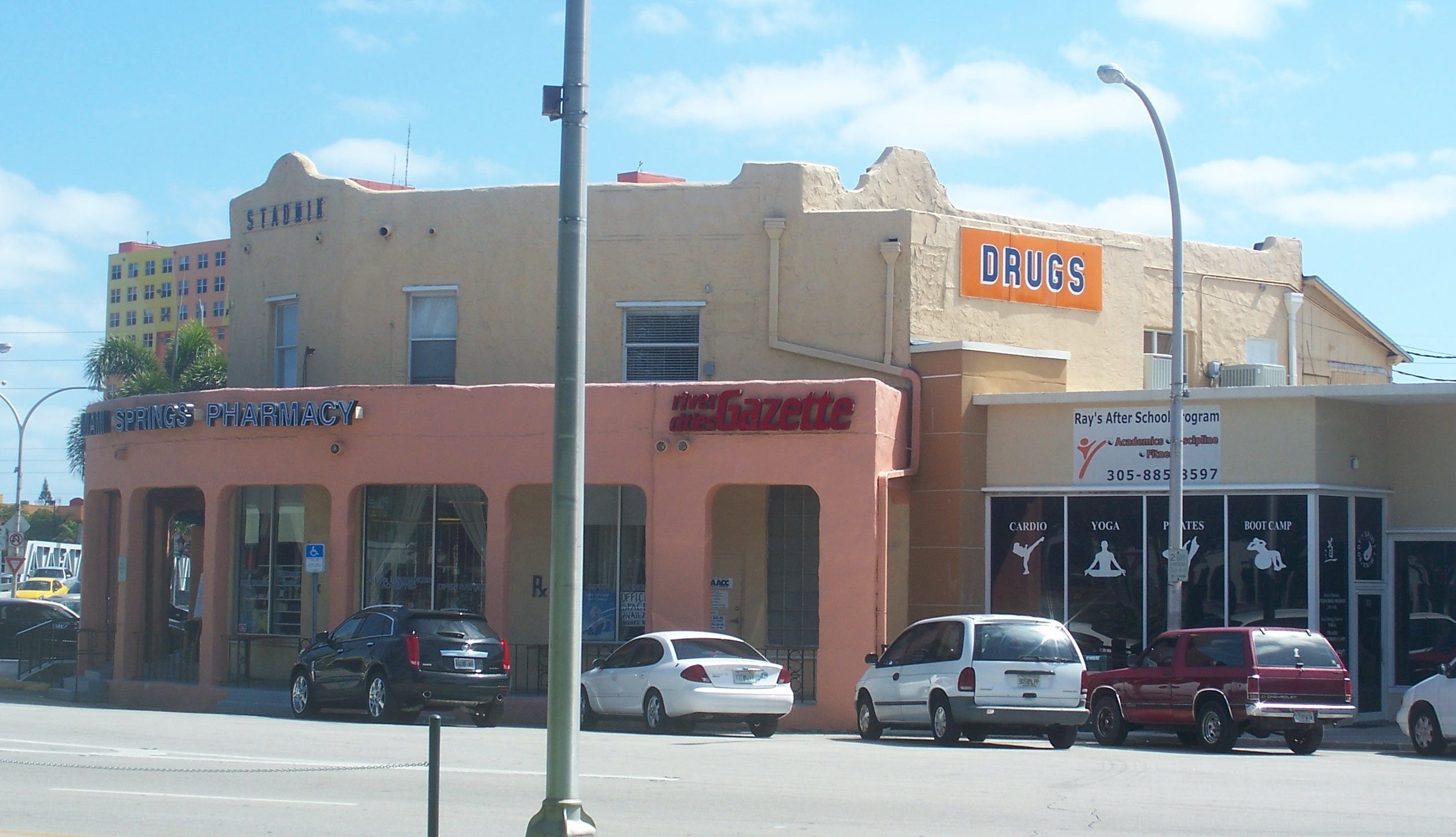

- Location within Miami Location within Florida Location within the United States
- Location: Miami Springs, Florida
- Coordinates: 25°49′17″N 80°16′53″W
- Architectural style: Pueblo
- MPS: Country Club Estates TR
- NRHP reference No.: 85003467
- Added to NRHP: November 1, 1985

The Clune Building (also known as the Stadnik Building) is a historic site in Miami Springs, Florida. It is located at 45 Curtiss Parkway. On November 1, 1985, it was added to the U.S. National Register of Historic Places. It was a work of Curtiss & Bright.

The Miami Springs Historical Museum was formerly located in the building, above Stadnik's Miami Springs Pharmacy, but moved to another location in 2006.
