= Lua Curtiss House I =

- U.S. National Register of Historic Places
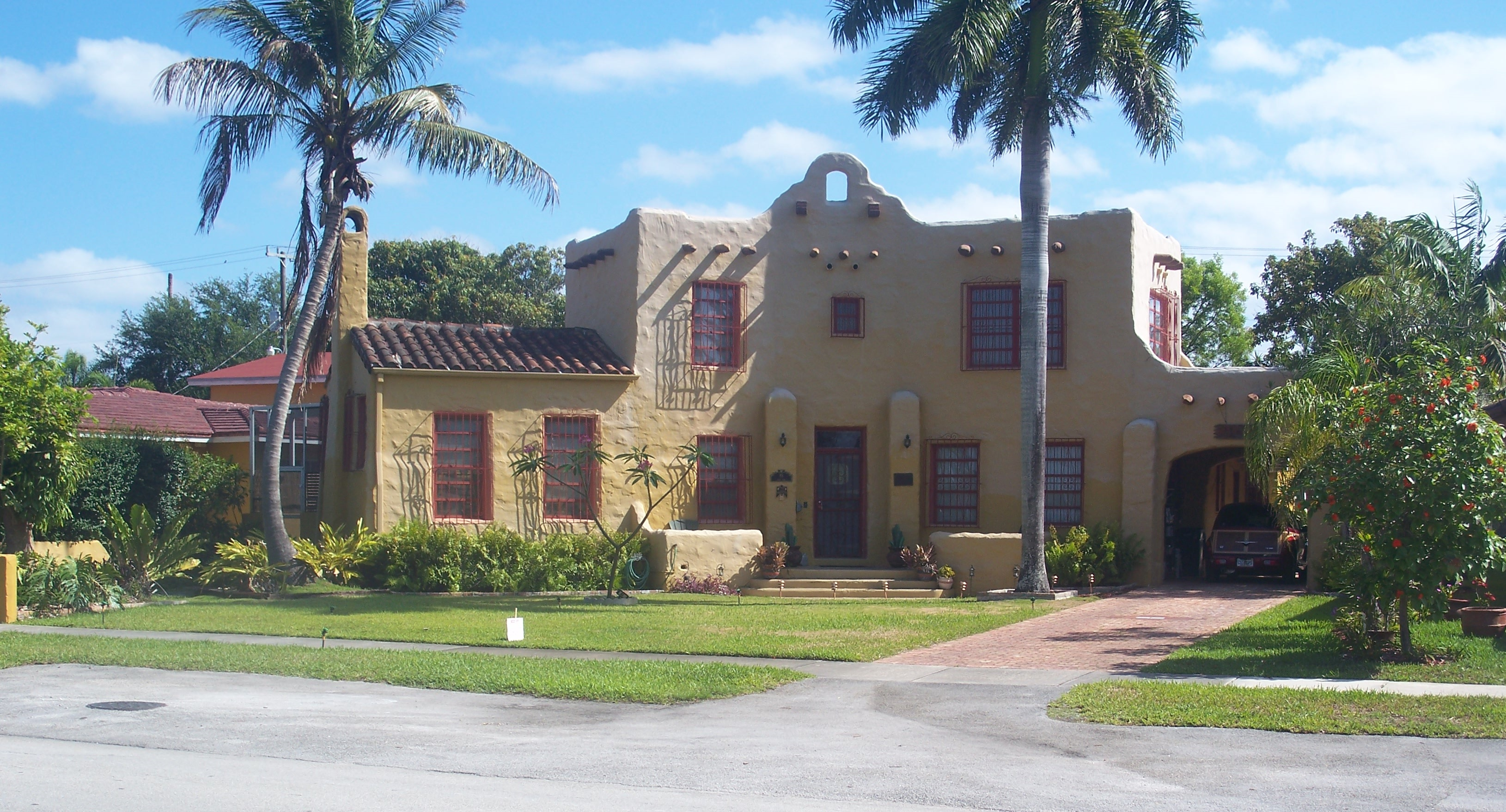

- Location within Miami Location within Florida Location within the United States
- Location: Miami Springs, Florida
- Coordinates: 25°49′1″N 80°17′17″W
- MPS: Country Club Estates TR
- NRHP reference No.: 85003465
- Added to NRHP: November 1, 1985

The Lua Curtiss House I (also known as The Alamo) is a historic home in Miami Springs, Florida. It is located at 85 Deer Run. On November 1, 1985, it was added to the U.S. National Register of Historic Places. It was a work of Curtiss & Bright.
