= Hequembourg House =

Historic house in Florida, United States

- Formerly listed on the U.S. National Register of Historic Places
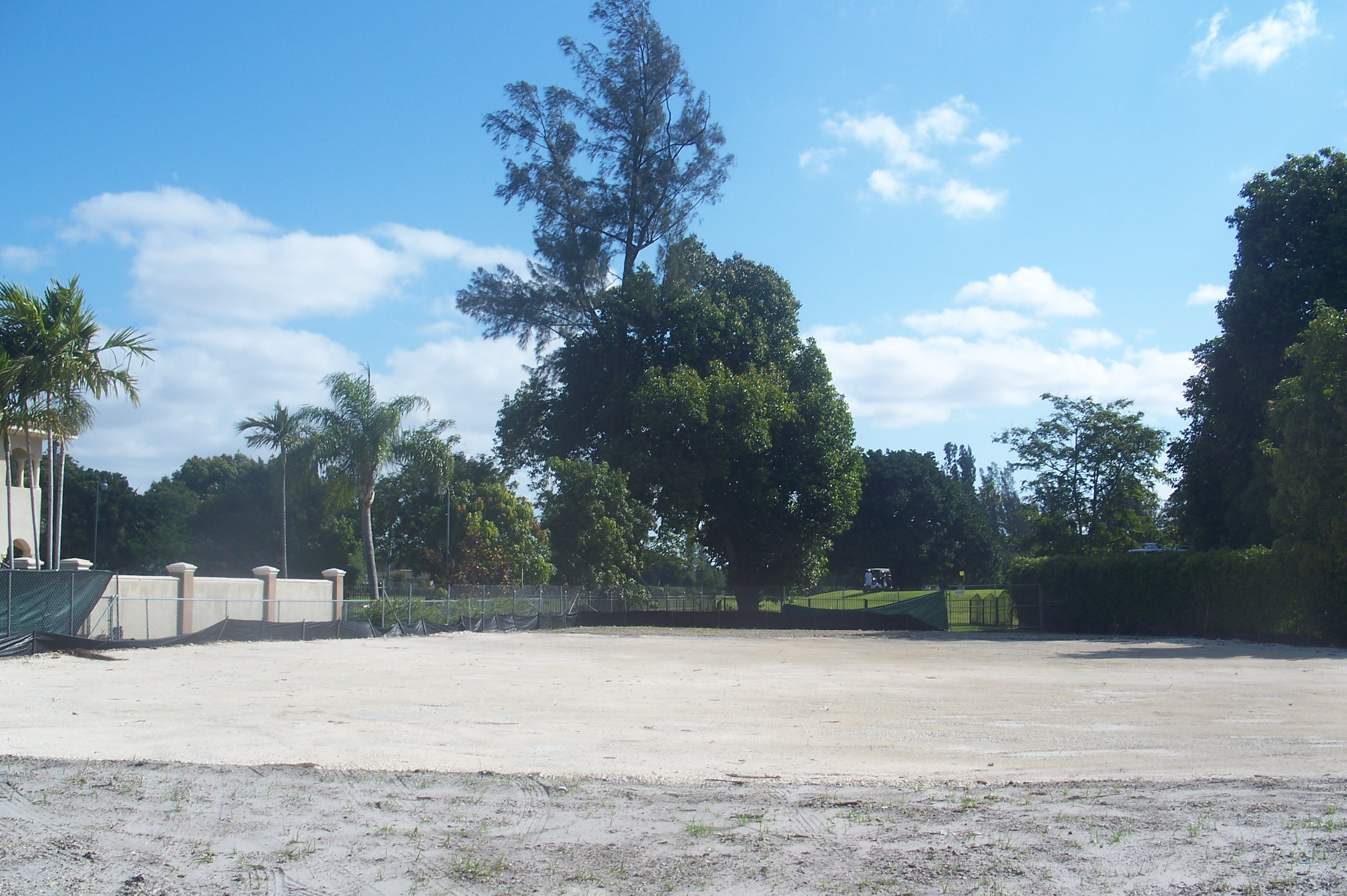
- Site where house used to be

- Location within Miami Location within Florida Location within the United States
- Location: Miami Springs, Florida
- Coordinates: 25°48′45″N 80°17′51″W
- MPS: Country Club Estates TR
- NRHP reference No.: 85003468

Significant dates
- Added to NRHP: November 1, 1985
- Removed from NRHP: January 18, 2011

The Hequembourg House was a historic home in Miami Springs, Florida. It was located at 851 Hunting Lodge Drive. The pueblo-style structure was constructed in 1926 by architects Curtiss & Bright. It was added to the U.S. National Register of Historic Places on November 1, 1985. The building was significantly damaged by Hurricane Wilma in 2005, declared unsafe, and was subsequently demolished on October 1, 2010. It was removed from the Register in January 2011.
