= Curtiss & Bright =

Curtiss & Bright were developers in the Florida cities of Hialeah, Miami Springs and Opa-locka.

Aviation pioneer Glenn Curtiss formed many corporations; "Curtiss & Bright" refers to the partnership between Curtiss and James Bright.

A number of their works are listed on the U.S. National Register of Historic Places.

Works include:

- Carl G. Adams House, 31 Hunting Lodge Ct. Miami Springs, FL (Curtiss & Bright), NRHP-listed
- Clune Building, 45 Curtiss Pkwy. Miami Springs, FL (Curtiss & Bright), NRHP-listed
- Lua Curtiss House I, 85 Deer Run Miami Springs, FL (Curtiss & Bright), NRHP-listed
- Lua Curtiss House II, 150 Hunting Lodge Miami Springs, FL (Curtiss & Bright), NRHP-listed
- Hequembourg House, 851 Hunting Lodge Miami Springs, FL (Curtiss & Bright), formerly NRHP-listed but since demolished

== See also ==
- Opa-locka Company, a related firm that developed the city of Opa-locka
