= Osceola Apartment Hotel =

- U.S. National Register of Historic Places
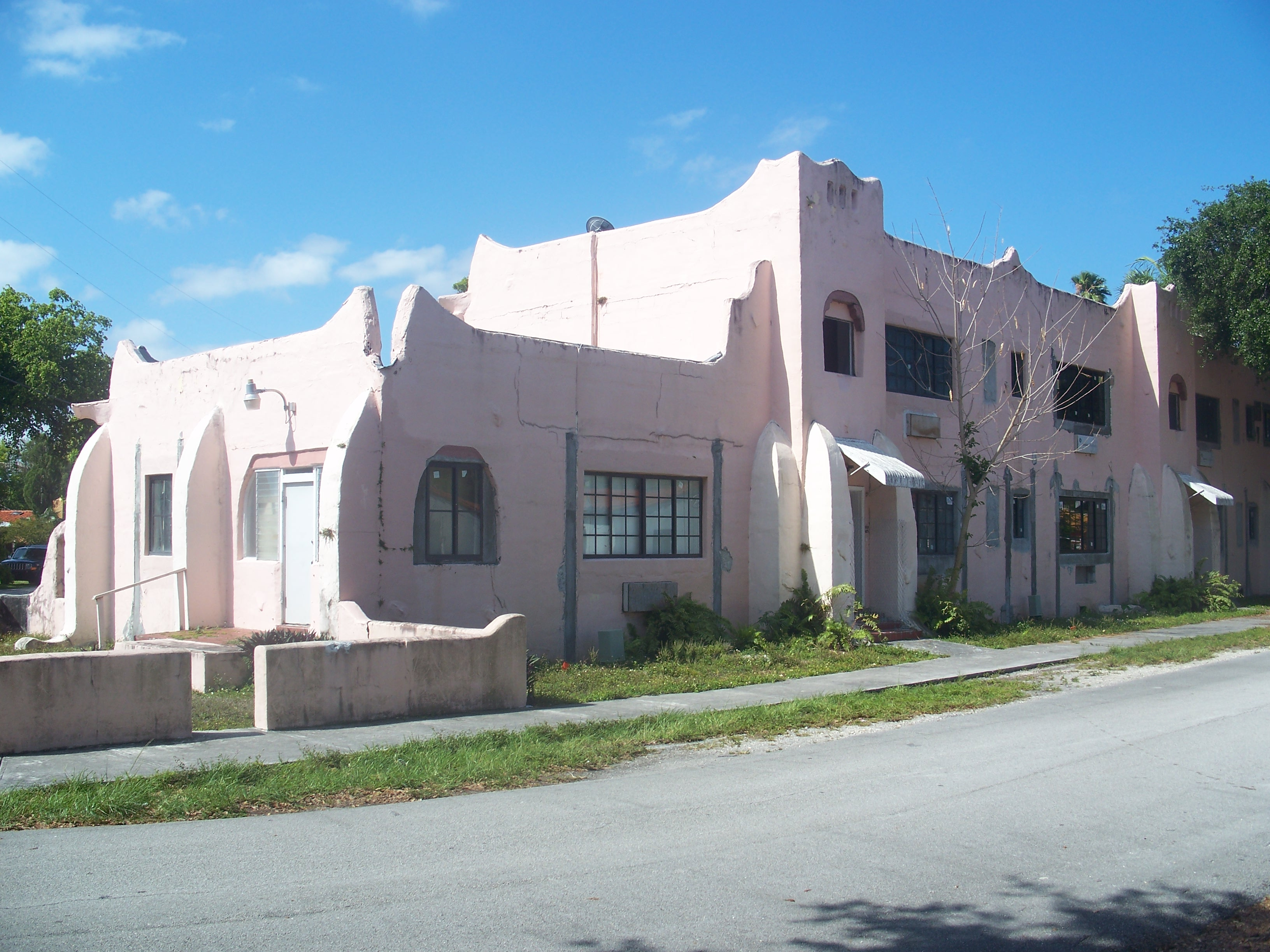

- Location within Miami Location within Florida Location within the United States
- Location: Miami Springs, Florida
- Coordinates: 25°49′8″N 80°17′8″W
- Architectural style: Pueblo
- MPS: Country Club Estates TR
- NRHP reference No.: 85003469
- Added to NRHP: November 1, 1985

The Osceola Apartment Hotel (also known as Azure Villas) is a historic hotel in Miami Springs, Florida. It is located at 200 Azure Way. On November 1, 1985, it was added to the U.S. National Register of Historic Places.
