= Country Club Estates TR =

- U.S. National Register of Historic Places
- Location within Miami Location within Florida Location within the United States
- Location: Miami Springs, Florida
- Coordinates: 25°49′11″N 80°17′28″W
- MPS: Country Club Estates Thematic Resource
- NRHP reference No.: 64000114

The following buildings were added to the National Register of Historic Places as part of the Country Club Estates Thematic Resource (or TR).

Resource Name	Address	City	County	Added
Carl G. Adams House	31 Hunting Lodge Court	Miami Springs	Dade County	November 1, 1985
Clune Building	45 Curtiss Parkway	Miami Springs	Dade County	November 1, 1985
Glenn Curtiss House	500 Deer Run	Miami Springs	Dade County	December 21, 2001
Lua Curtiss House I	85 Deer Run	Miami Springs	Dade County	November 1, 1985
Lua Curtiss House II	150 Hunting Lodge	Miami Springs	Dade County	November 1, 1985
Hequembourg House	851 Hunting Lodge	Miami Springs	Dade County	November 1, 1985
Millard-McCarty House	424 Hunting Lodge	Miami Springs	Dade County	April 22, 1986
Osceola Apartment Hotel	200 Azure Way	Miami Springs	Dade County	November 1, 1985

== Gallery ==
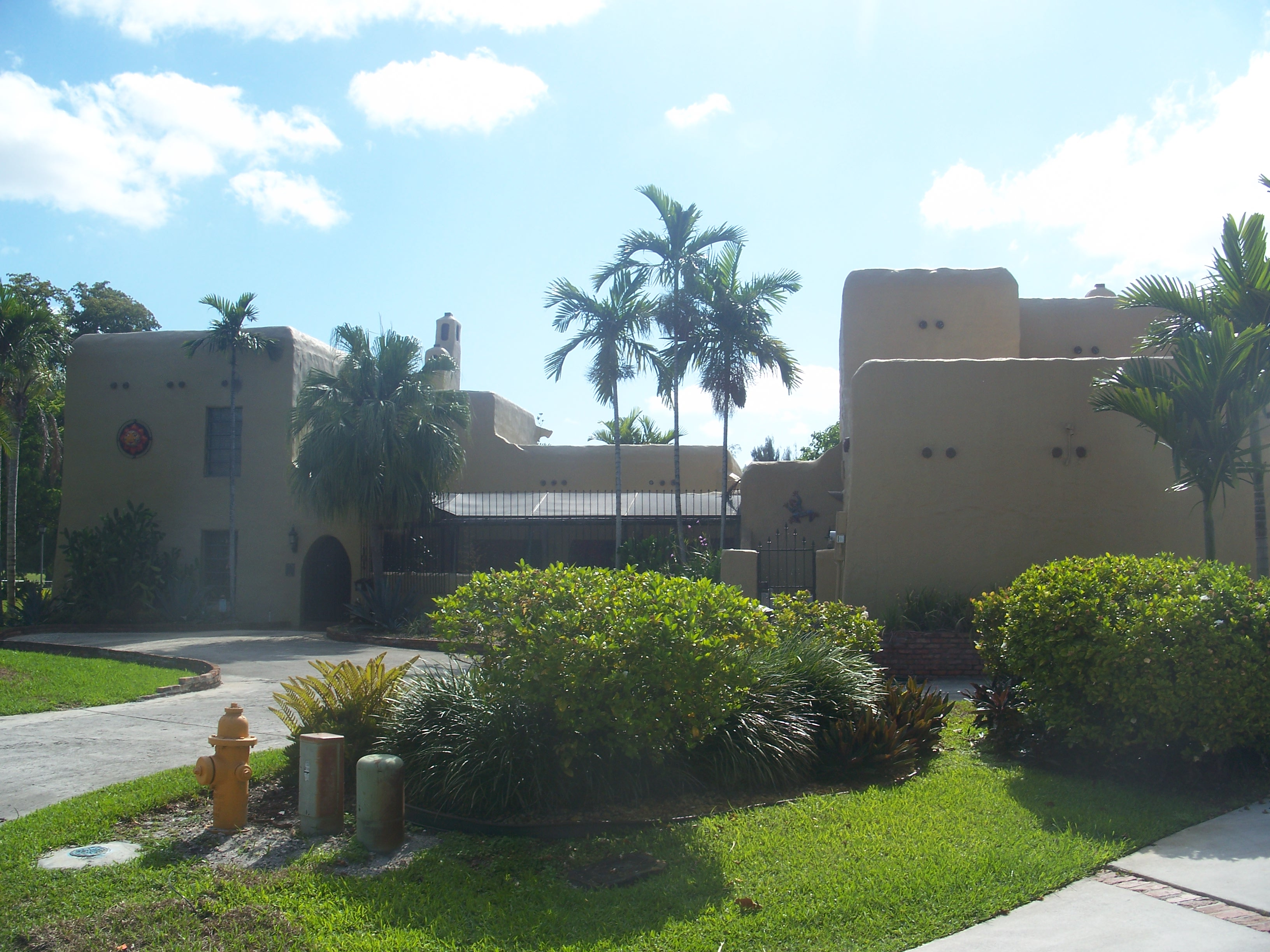
Carl G. Adams House

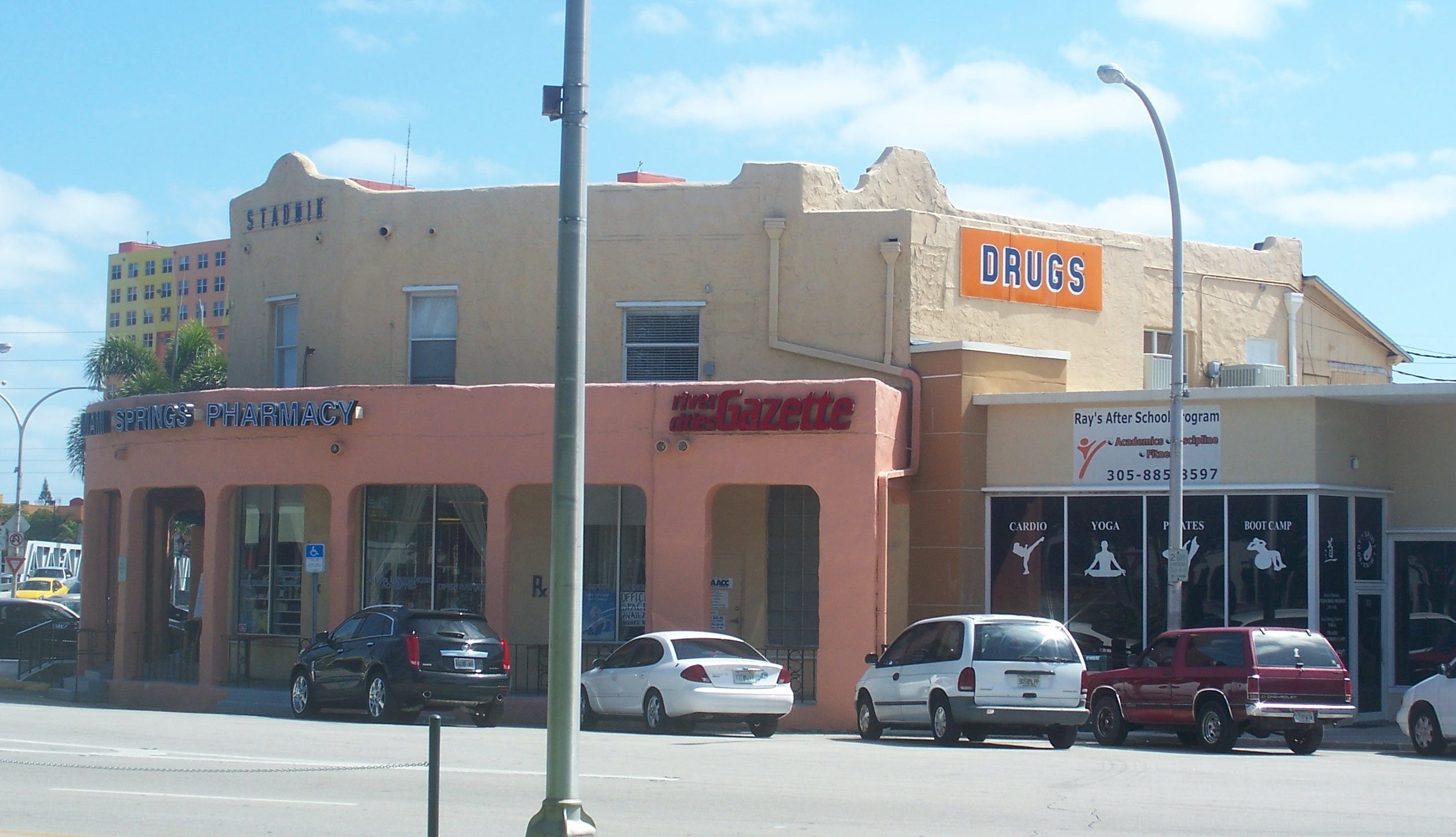
Clune Building

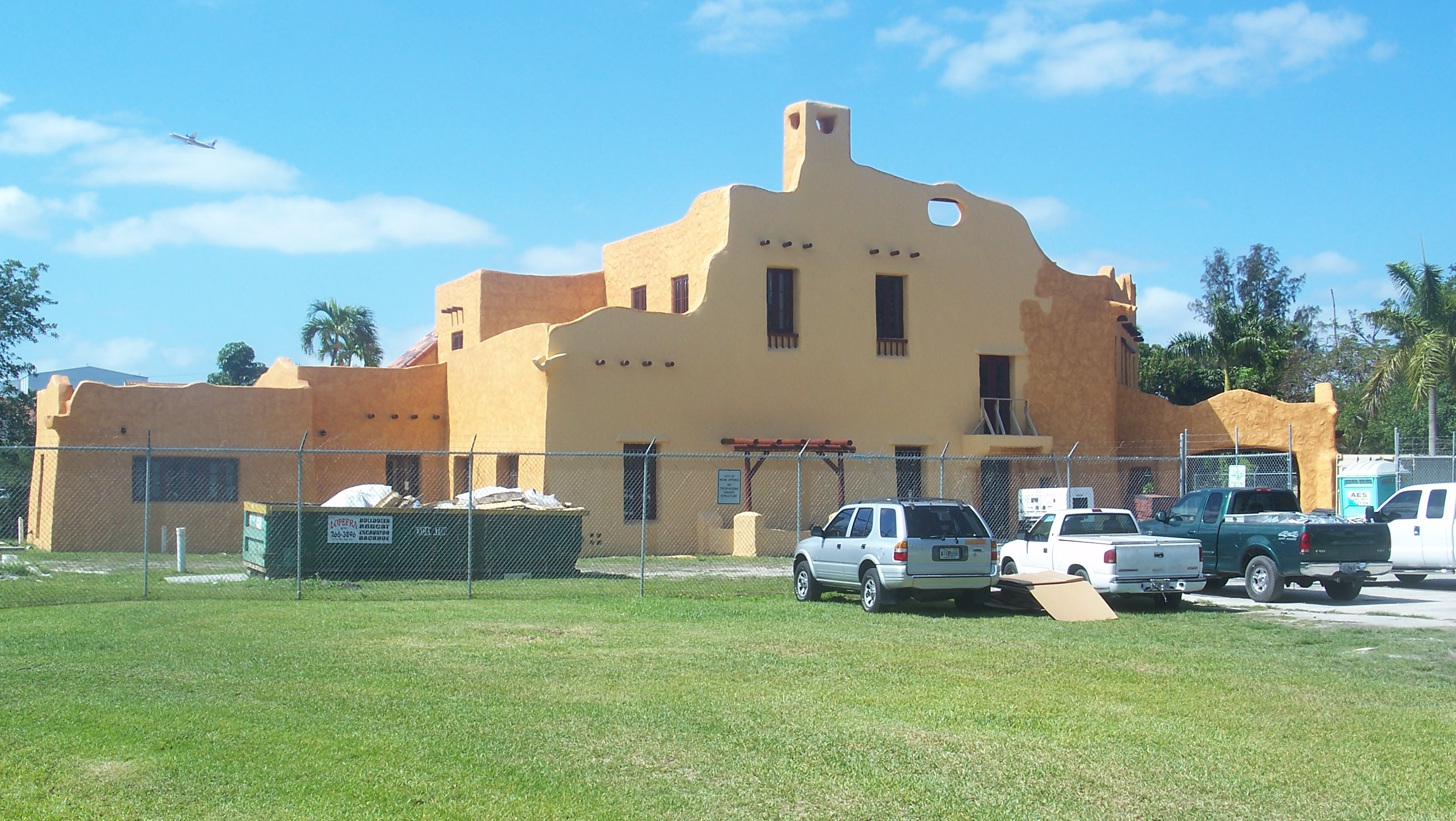
Glenn Curtiss House

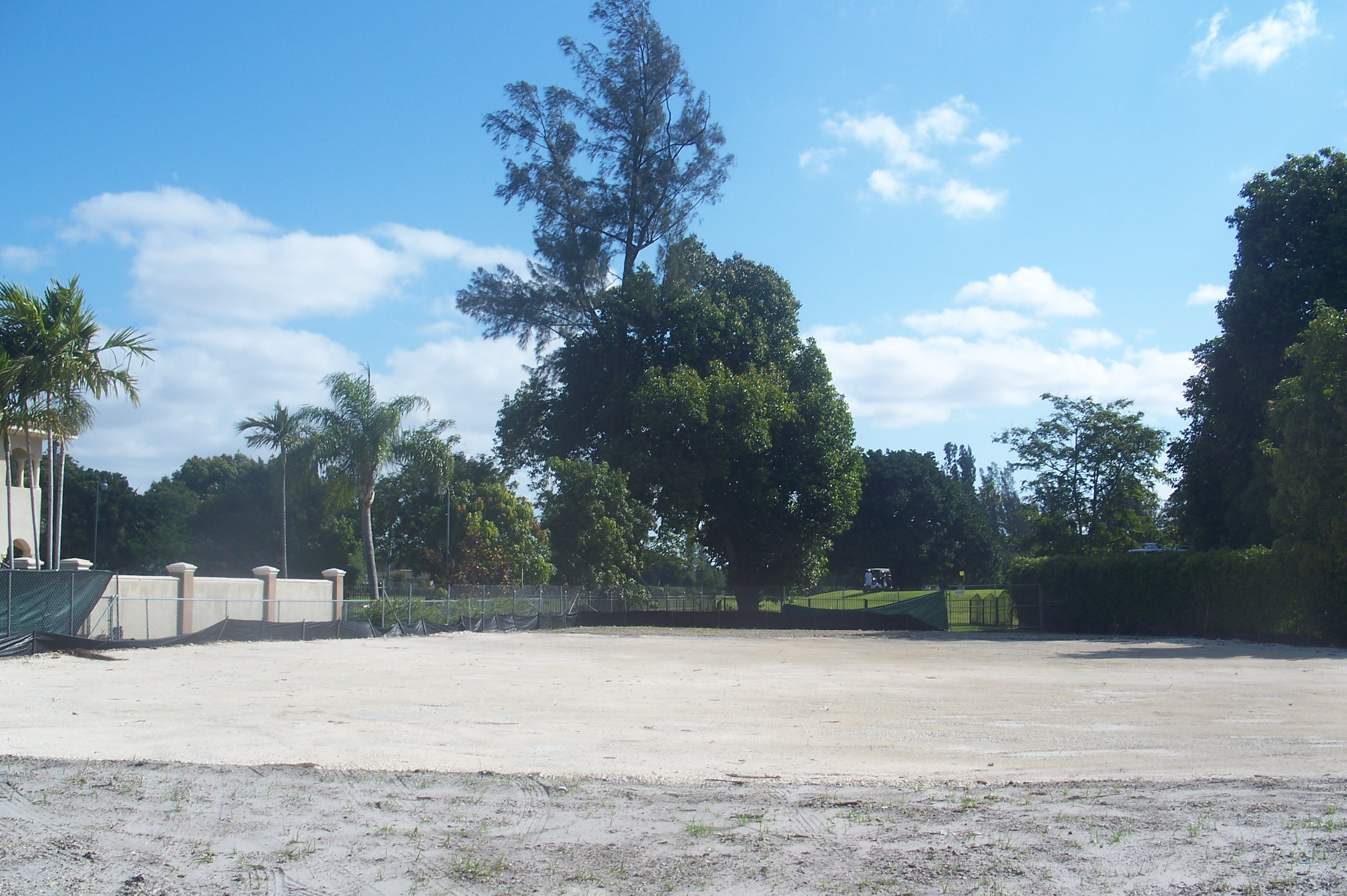
Hequembourg House site

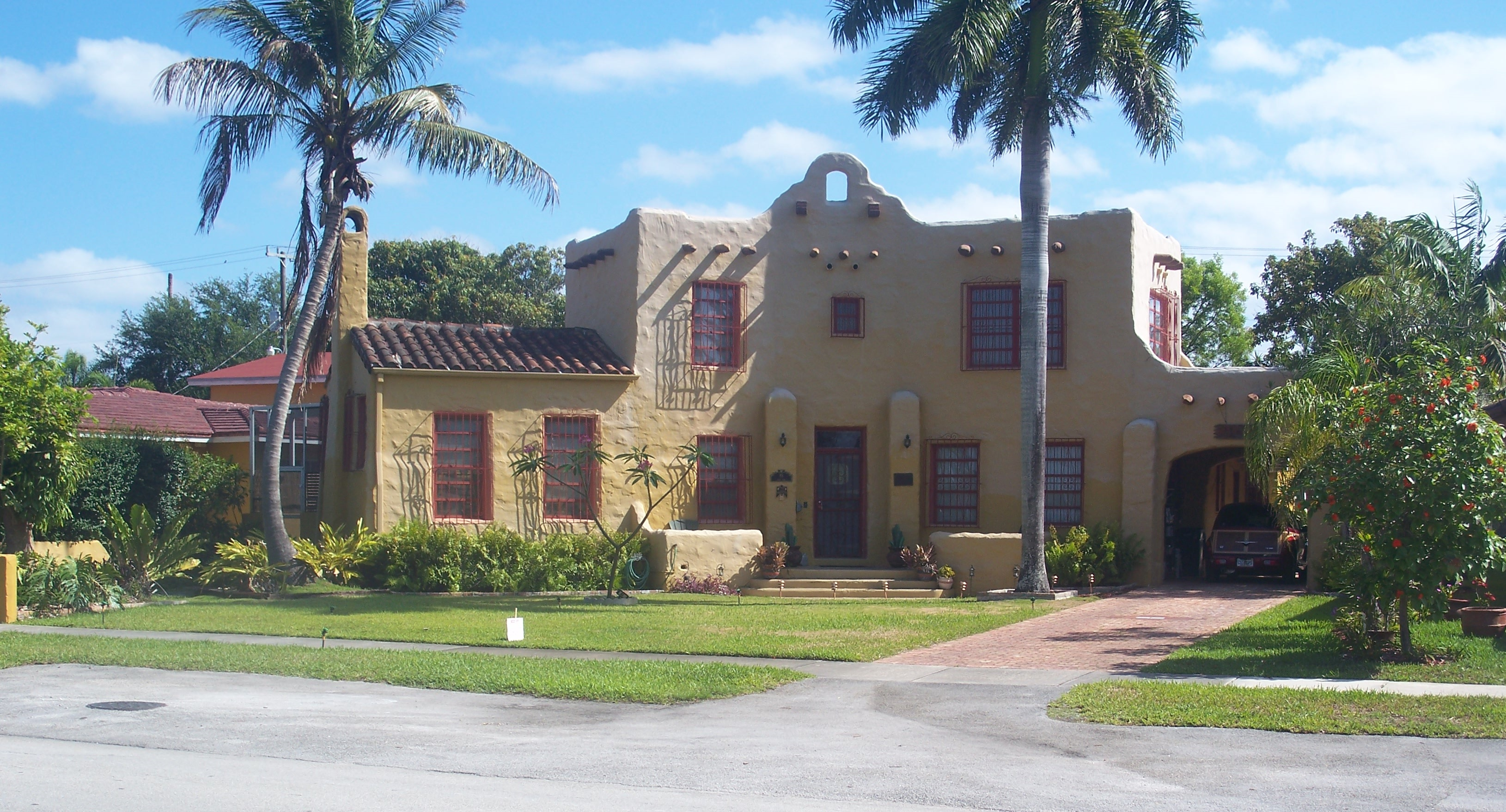
Lua Curtiss House I

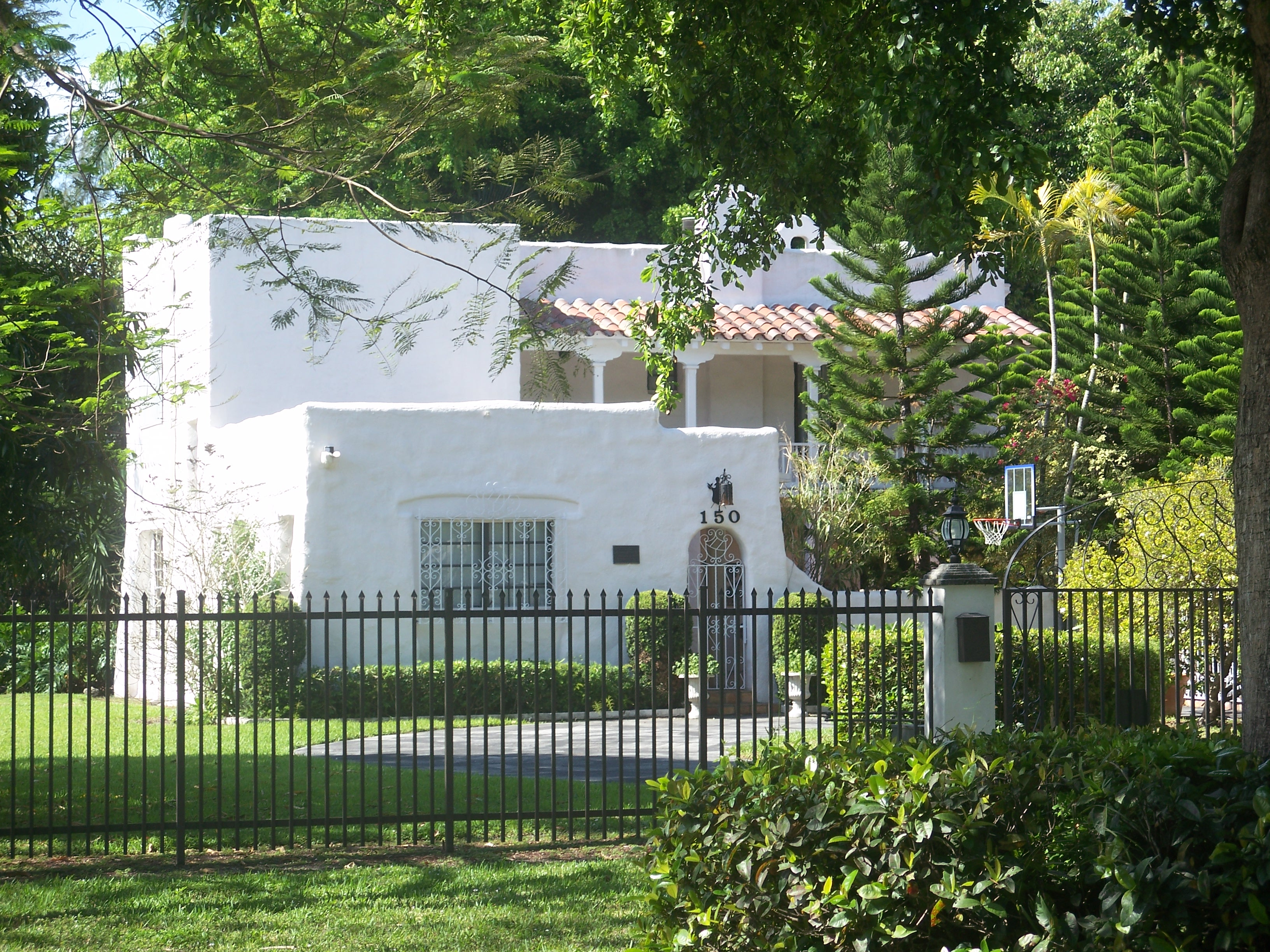
Lua Curtiss House II

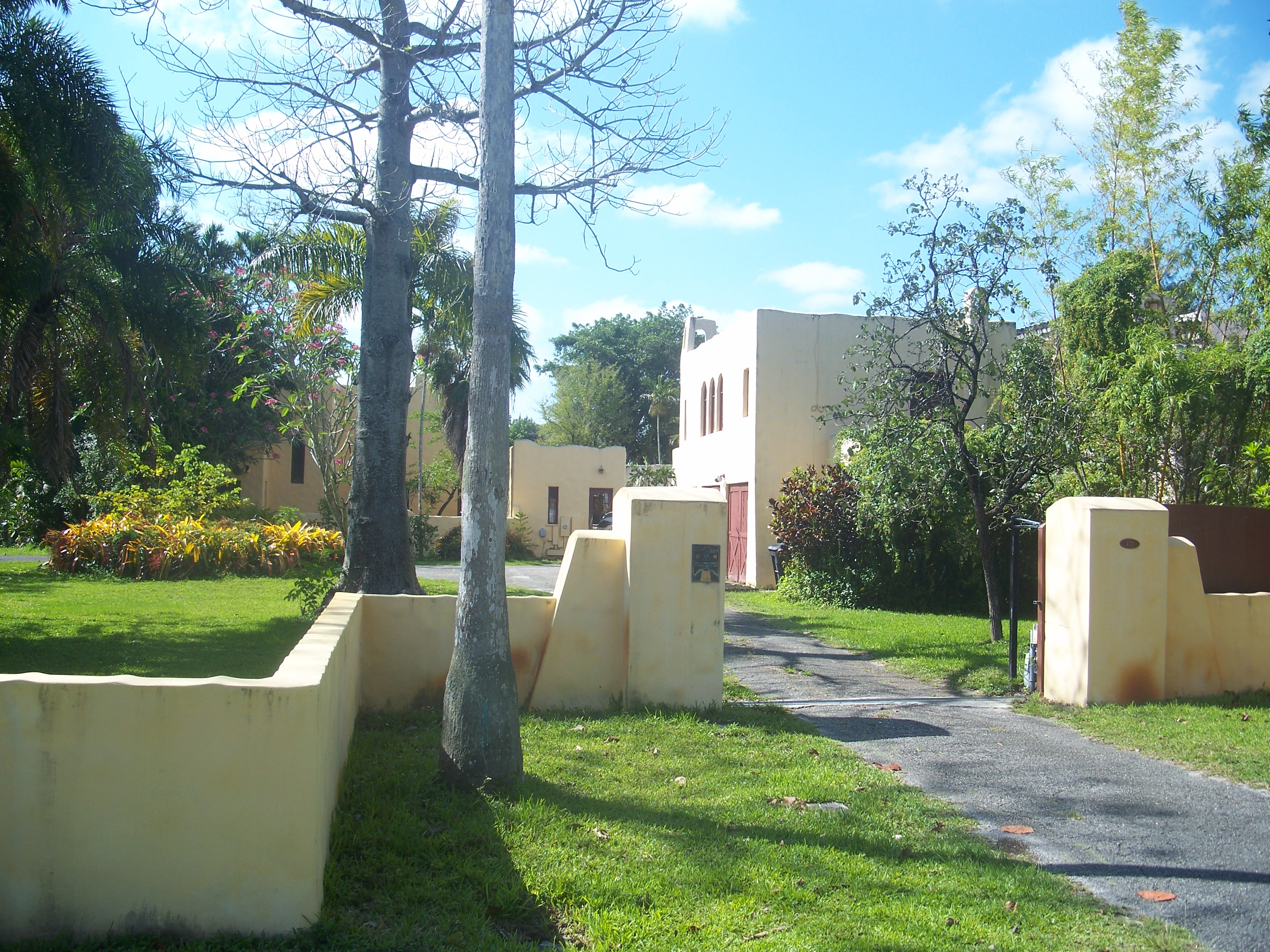
Millard-McCarty House

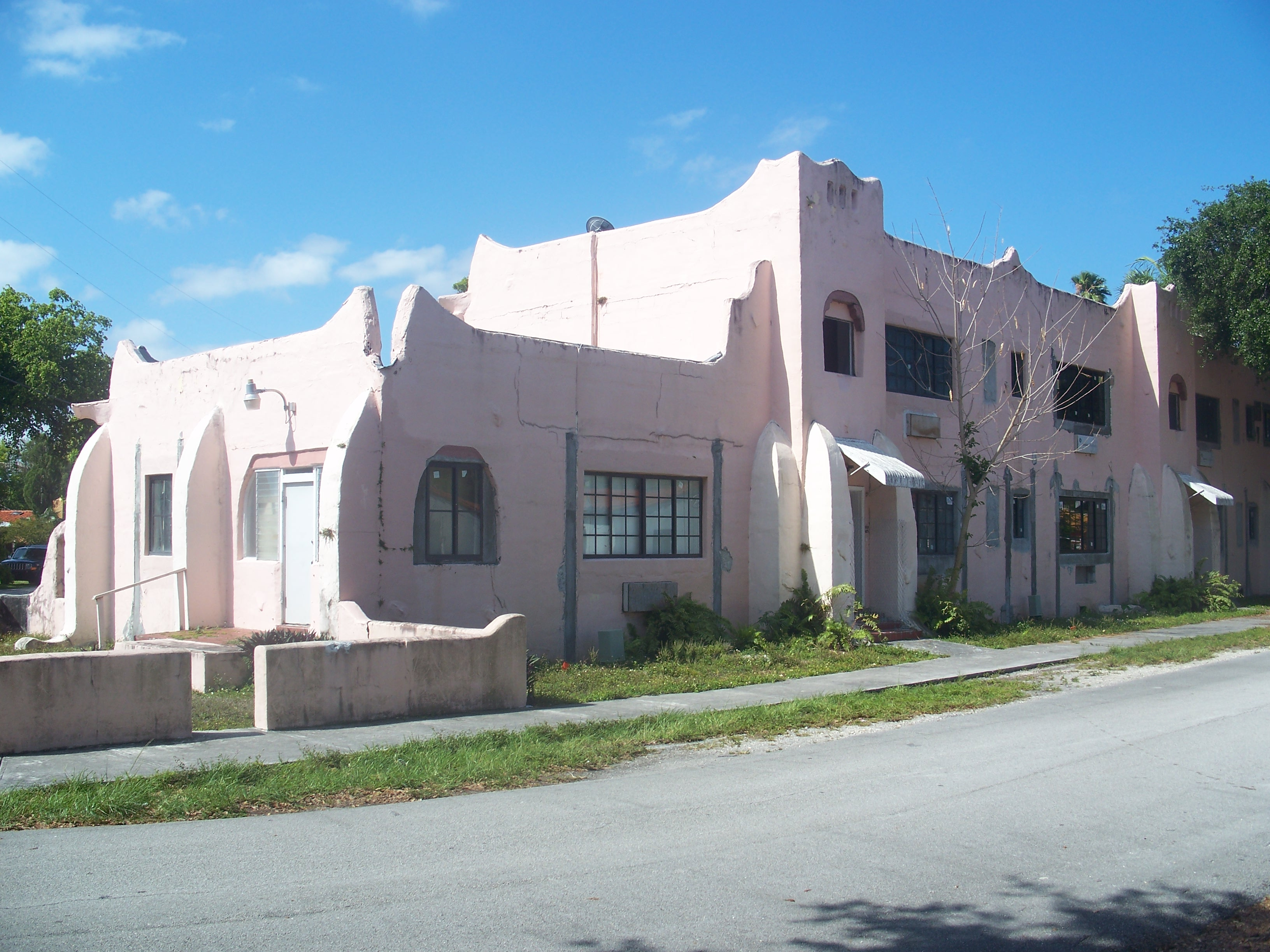
Osceola Apartment Hotel
