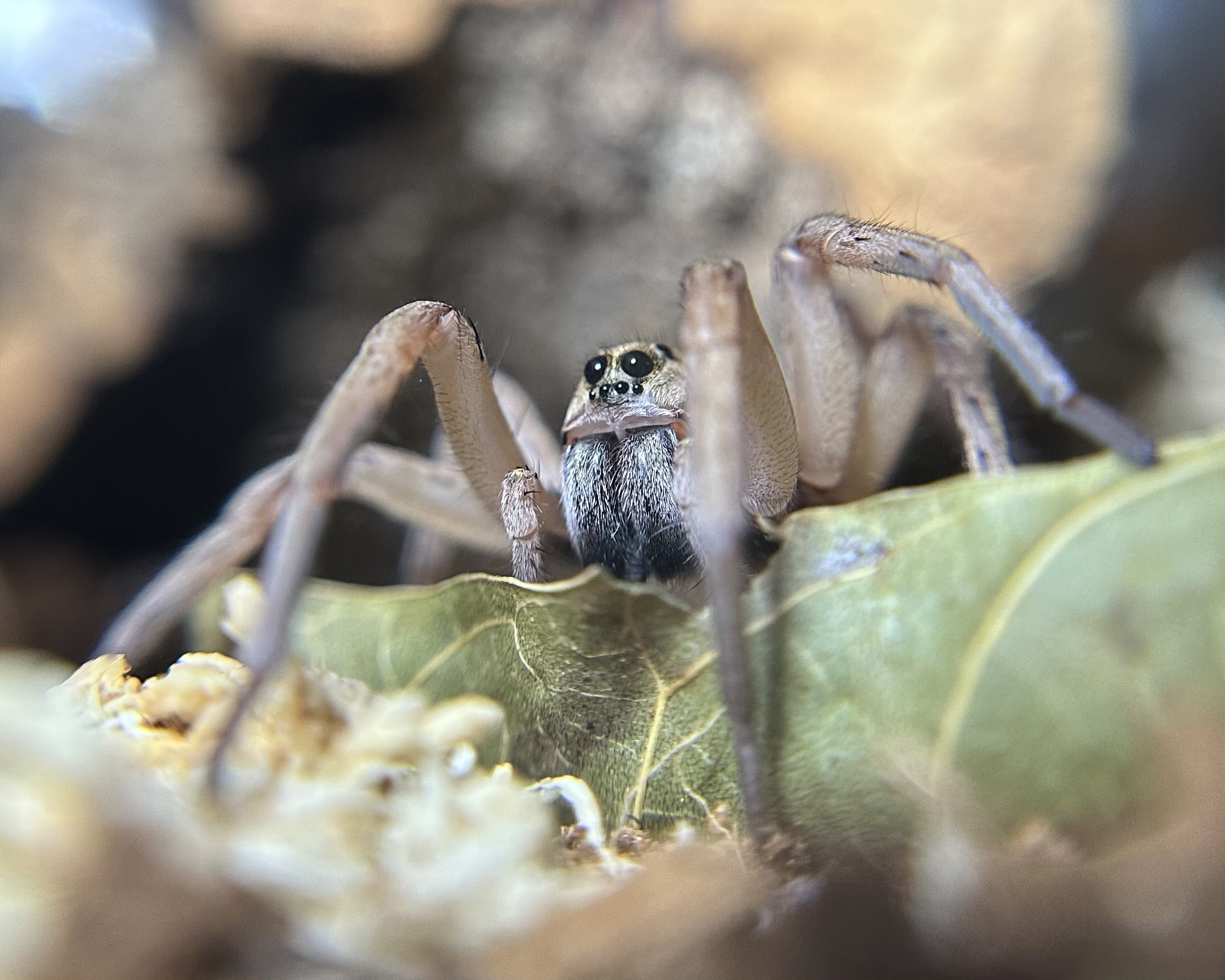

Scientific classification
- Kingdom: Animalia
- Phylum: Arthropoda
- Subphylum: Chelicerata
- Class: Arachnida
- Order: Araneae
- Infraorder: Araneomorphae
- Family: Lycosidae
- Genus: Hogna
- Species: H. miami

Binomial name
- Hogna miami (Wallace, 1942)

Synonyms
- Lycosa miami Wallace, 1942

= Hogna miami =

Species of wolf spider

Hogna miami, commonly known as the Florida wolf spider or Miami wolf spider, is a species of wolf spider in the family Lycosidae found in the southern portion of the state of Florida.

== Description ==
The Florida wolf spider is a dusky yellowish brown spider with a linear cream marking running from the front of its cephalothorax to its abdomen. The sides of its carapace are a darker brown, while its legs maintain the yellowish brown color of its cephalothorax and abdomen. Like other wolf spiders, H. miami is characterized by two large front facing eyes, four smaller eyes positioned in a row nearer to its chelicerae, and two eyes on the top of its cephalothorax pointing upwards.

== Taxonomy ==
The word Hogna may be a rough latinization of one of the Greek words ὄχνη (ókhnē) "pear" or ὄγχνη (ónkhnē) "pear-tree". Miami is derived from its prevalence in South Florida, with the first reported sightings of this species being in Miami Springs and Hialeah. First described in 1942, H. miami shares similar physiological characteristics with Hogna ammophilia and Hogna ericeticola, although females of this species possess minor differences in epigynal positioning.

== Habitat and distribution ==
The Florida wolf spider is native to Florida below 28-29° latitude, with most reported sightings occurring in Miami-Dade County. As with other wolf spiders, the Florida wolf spider is an active hunter, using its relatively advanced eyesight to stalk and hunt prey on the ground. Hogna miami is a terrestrial burrower, forming small, tubular burrows in the earth by digging with its front pairs of legs and tamping the earth with the pressure of its body. Its brown, speckled coloration is complementary to its life lived in burrows and on the ground. It prefers the humid, subtropical climates that associated with its native range.
