= Millard–McCarty House =

- U.S. National Register of Historic Places
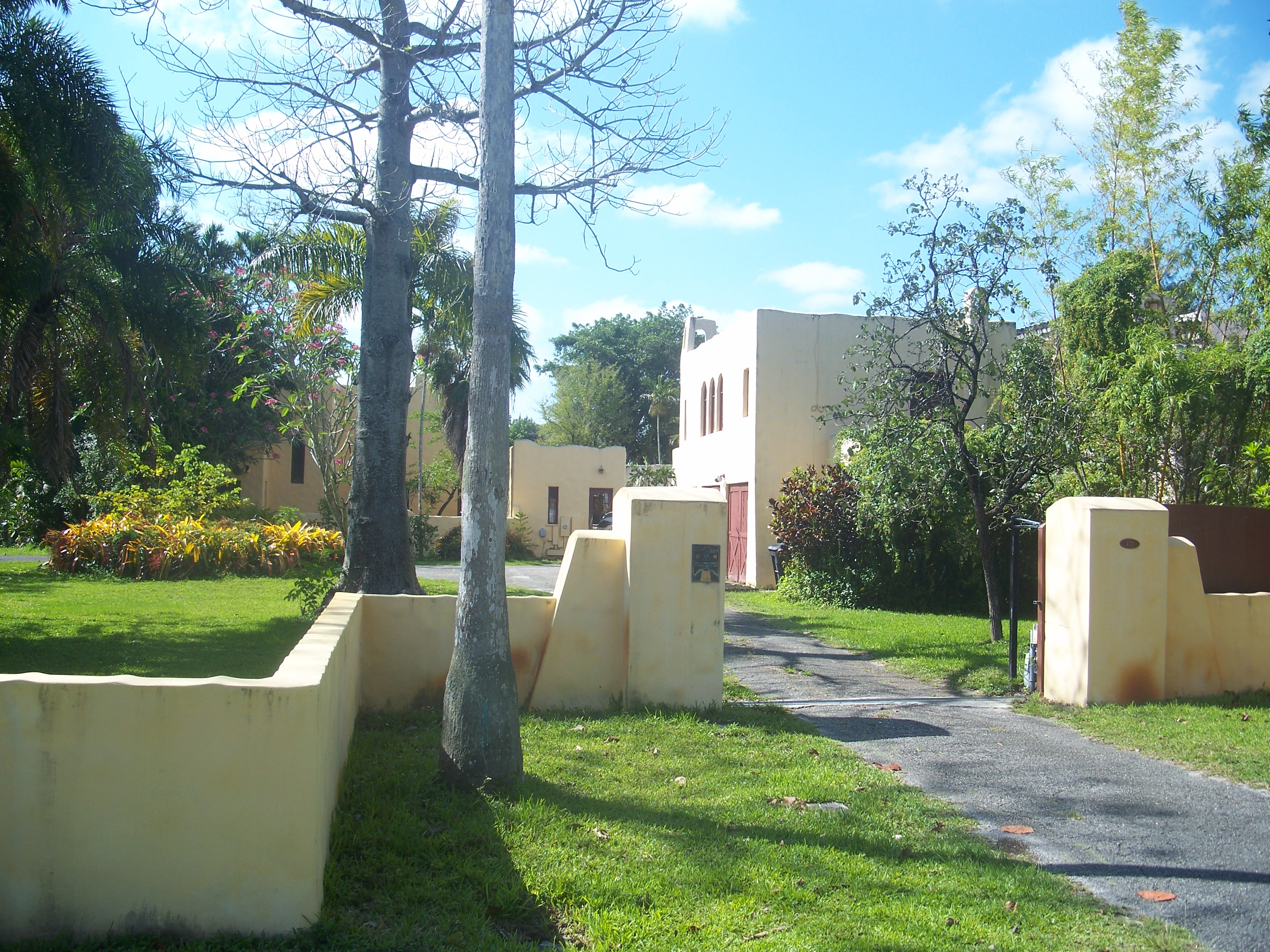

- Location within Miami Location within Florida Location within the United States
- Location: Miami Springs, Florida
- Coordinates: 25°49′4″N 80°17′43″W
- Built: c.1926
- Architectural style: Pueblo
- MPS: Country Club Estates TR
- NRHP reference No.: 86000872
- Added to NRHP: April 22, 1986

The Millard–McCarty House is a historic home in Miami Springs, Florida. In 1986 it was added to the National Register of Historic Places. It is located at 424 Hunting Lodge, within a development by Curtis and Bright.

It is a two-story Pueblo Revival-style house which is U-shaped in plan. It was completed in about 1926

The first owner was Ray Millard, who was the first postmasterof Hialeah. From 1947 to at least 1985 it was owned by William McCarty, mayor of Miami Beach during 1948–51.
