= Virginia Gardens, Florida =

- Village
- Village of Virginia Gardens
- Seal

- Location in Miami-Dade County and the state of Florida

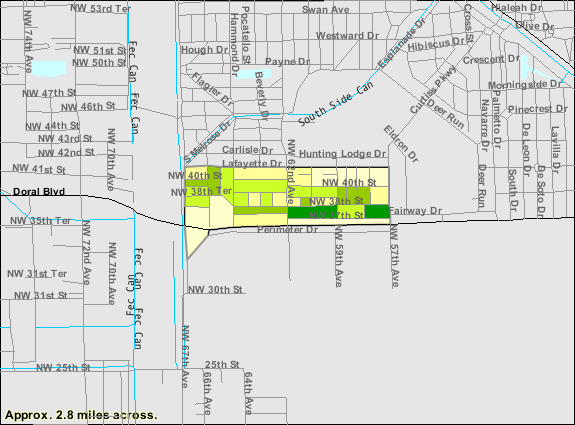
- U.S. Census Bureau map showing village boundaries
- Coordinates: 25°48′34″N 80°17′51″W
- Country: United States
- State: Florida
- County: Miami-Dade
- Incorporated: July 10, 1947

Government
  - Type: Mayor-Council
  - Mayor: Fred "Spencer" Deno IV
  - Council President: Jorge Arce
  - Councilmembers: Debra Conover, Gabriel Fernandez, Michael Tur, and Elizabeth Taylor-Martinez
  - Village Clerk: Maritza Fernandez-Guevara
  - Village Attorney: Guillermo Cuadra

Area
  - Total: 0.29 sq mi (0.76 km^{2})
  - Land: 0.29 sq mi (0.76 km^{2})
  - Water: 0 sq mi (0.00 km^{2})
- Elevation: 7 ft (2.1 m)

Population (2020)
  - Total: 2,364
  - Density: 8,054.2/sq mi (3,109.74/km^{2})
- Time zone: UTC-5 (EST)
  - Summer (DST): UTC-4 (EDT)
- ZIP Code: 33166
- Area codes: 305, 786, 645
- FIPS code: 12-74575
- GNIS feature ID: 2407565
- Website: www.virginiagardens-fl.gov

Virginia Gardens is a village in Miami-Dade County, Florida, United States. The village is a part of the Miami metropolitan area of South Florida. According to the U.S. Census Bureau, the village had a population of 2,364 in 2020.

== History ==
In 1947, Miami Springs (of which it was then a part) passed an ordinance outlawing horses from the city limits. In response, about 50 citizens decided to break away and form their own village.

The Village of Virginia Gardens was officially incorporated as a municipality on July 10, 1947.

The village is named for the state of Virginia, original home of many of the wealthy transplants who made up the founding residents. At the time of incorporation, many of the residents owned large estates, some up to 5 acres (20,000 m^{2}), suitable for horse ownership. Only a single 1-acre (4,000 m^{2}) residential property remains within the village limits today; the bulk of residential property now consists of 0.2-acre (810 m^{2}) lots typical of suburban developments.

== Geography ==
Virginia Gardens is located 9 miles (14 km) northwest of downtown Miami. It is bordered to the north and east by the city of Miami Springs and to the south by Miami International Airport.

According to the United States Census Bureau, the village has a total area of 0.3 square miles (0.8 km^{2}), all land.

=== Climate ===
The Village of El Portal has a tropical climate, similar to the climate found in much of the Caribbean. It is part of the only region in the 48 contiguous states that falls under that category. More specifically, it generally has a tropical savanna climate (Köppen climate classification: Aw), bordering a tropical monsoon climate (Köppen climate classification: Am).

== Demographics ==
Historical population
Census	Pop.	Note	%±
1950	235		—
1960	2,159		818.7%
1970	2,524		16.9%
1980	2,098		−16.9%
1990	2,212		5.4%
2000	2,348		6.1%
2010	2,375		1.1%
2020	2,364		−0.5%
U.S. Decennial Census

=== 2020 census ===
As of the 2020 census, Virginia Gardens had a population of 2,364. The median age was 46.1 years. 14.4% of residents were under the age of 18 and 19.8% of residents were 65 years of age or older. For every 100 females there were 90.6 males, and for every 100 females age 18 and over there were 91.1 males age 18 and over.

100.0% of residents lived in urban areas, while 0.0% lived in rural areas.

There were 924 households in Virginia Gardens, of which 29.7% had children under the age of 18 living in them. Of all households, 43.6% were married-couple households, 18.3% were households with a male householder and no spouse or partner present, and 28.1% were households with a female householder and no spouse or partner present. About 21.9% of all households were made up of individuals and 9.8% had someone living alone who was 65 years of age or older.

There were 959 housing units, of which 3.6% were vacant. The homeowner vacancy rate was 0.0% and the rental vacancy rate was 3.8%.

Virginia Gardens racial composition (Hispanics excluded from racial categories) (NH = Non-Hispanic)
Race	Number	Percentage
White (NH)	289	12.23%
Black or African American (NH)	14	0.59%
Native American or Alaska Native (NH)	3	0.13%
Asian (NH)	15	0.63%
Pacific Islander or Native Hawaiian (NH)	0	0.00%
Some other race (NH)	13	0.55%
Two or more races/Multiracial (NH)	22	0.93%
Hispanic or Latino (any race)	2,008	84.94%
Total	2,364	100.00%

In the 2020 American Community Survey 5-year estimates, there were 568 families residing in the village.

=== 2010 census ===
Virginia Gardens Demographics
2010 Census	Virginia Gardens	Miami-Dade County	Florida
Total population	2,375	2,496,435	18,801,310
Population, percent change, 2000 to 2010	+1.1%	+10.8%	+17.6%
Population density	8,062.3/sq mi	1,315.5/sq mi	350.6/sq mi
White or Caucasian (including White Hispanic)	90.7%	73.8%	75.0%
(Non-Hispanic White or Caucasian)	19.3%	15.4%	57.9%
Black or African-American	2.7%	18.9%	16.0%
Hispanic or Latino (of any race)	77.3%	65.0%	22.5%
Asian	1.7%	1.5%	2.4%
Native American or Native Alaskan	0.0%	0.2%	0.4%
Pacific Islander or Native Hawaiian	0.0%	0.0%	0.1%
Two or more races (Multiracial)	2.1%	2.4%	2.5%
Some Other Race	2.8%	3.2%	3.6%

As of the 2010 United States census, there were 2,375 people, 808 households, and 554 families residing in the village.

=== 2000 census ===
In 2000, 31.7% had children under the age of 18 living with them, 47.3% were married couples living together, 14.9% had a female householder with no husband present, and 33.0% were non-families. 27.1% of all households were made up of individuals, and 7.9% had someone living alone who was 65 years of age or older. The average household size was 2.63 and the average family size was 3.22.

In 2000, age distribution was 23.0% under the age of 18, 7.6% from 18 to 24, 31.9% from 25 to 44, 23.9% from 45 to 64, and 13.5% who were 65 years of age or older. The median age was 38 years. For every 100 females, there were 97.5 males. For every 100 females age 18 and over, there were 93.1 males.

In 2000, the median household income $40,197, and the median family income was $44,800. Males had a median income of $31,302 versus $26,274 for females. The per capita income for the village was $21,139. About 9.5% of families and 11.3% of the population were below the poverty line, including 16.3% of those under age 18 and 6.6% of those age 65 or over.

In 2000, speakers of Spanish as a first language made up 71.66%, and English as the main language accounted for 28.34% of the population.

== Education ==
Virginia Gardens is a part of Miami-Dade County Public Schools.

- Miami Springs High School serves Virginia Gardens.
- Blessed Trinity Catholic School, a K–8 school of the Roman Catholic Archdiocese of Miami, is in Virginia Gardens.
