= Glenn Curtiss Mansion =

Historic house in Florida, United States

- Glenn Curtiss House
- U.S. National Register of Historic Places
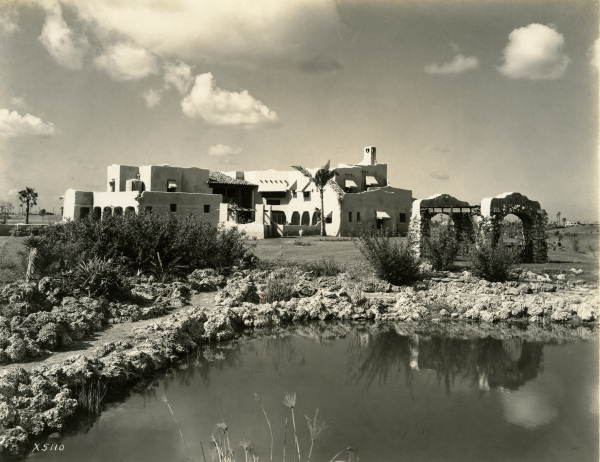
- View from the east, January 1927

- Location within Miami Location within Florida Location within the United States
- Location: Miami Springs, Florida
- Coordinates: 25°48′35″N 80°17′1″W
- MPS: Country Club Estates TR
- NRHP reference No.: 85003579
- Added to NRHP: December 21, 2001

The Glenn H. Curtiss Mansion and Gardens is a historic home located at 500 Deer Run in Miami Springs, Florida and open to the public as an event space or for private tours by prior arrangement.

It is located at the northern edge of Miami International Airport.

== History ==
Designed in the Pueblo Revival style, the mansion was constructed in 1925 by aviation pioneer Glenn Hammond Curtiss, developer of the cities of Hialeah, Opa-locka, Florida, and Miami Springs. Curtiss lived at the large, two-story residence with his wife, Lena Curtiss until his death in 1930. Mrs. Curtiss referred to the mansion as Dar-Err-Aha, which means "House of Happiness."

The mansion was the largest of Pueblo themed houses built by the Curtiss-Wright Company in its development of Country Club Estates in Miami Springs. The house features a central patio that faces the eastern perimeter of the golf course. The landscaped estate consisted of over 30 acres (120,000 m^{2}), with a small lake on the east side of the property. Curtiss brought many species of water birds to the lake, including flamingos and swans. Together with the adjacent property, it formed a 21-acre (85,000 m^{2}) complex.

After Curtiss's death in the early 1930s, Lena Curtiss married H. Sayre Wheeler, a friend and business associate of her husband. Wheeler served as mayor of Miami Springs from 1942 to 1944, and he was part owner of the Michaels and Wheeler Insurance Company. The couple lived in the house until the late 1940s. The estate was sold in the mid-1950s and became the Miami Springs Villas. On January 9, 1969, the estate hosted the Miami Touchdown Club annual dinner where Joe Namath famously guaranteed that his New York Jets would defeat the heavily favored Baltimore Colts in Super Bowl III. The estate was sold to Forte Hotels, International, Inc. in the late 1970s, and it currently is owned by the city of Miami Springs.

Since 1998, the Pueblo Revival-style Mansion has been the property of the City of Miami Springs, and the not-for-profit all volunteer Curtiss Mansion, Inc. was formed to restore and operate this historic home.

Designated a Miami Springs historic site in 1987, the mansion was added to the NRHP on December 21, 2001.

== Architecture ==
Its architect, Martin L. Hampton, was one of Miami's most prominent architects during the 1920s—his designs include the former Miami Beach City Hall and the Congress Building in downtown Miami. The house is roughly V-shaped in plan and constructed of hollow clay tile with a rough textured stucco exterior. The roof is flat with irregular parapet walls embellished by projecting waterspouts and irregular shaped openings. The main entrance to the residence is set within a deeply recessed T-shaped opening and marked by a flat-roofed porte cochere. At the south end of the lake is an arbor and barbecue grill. The grill was constructed of oolitic limestone (coral rock), which was a by-product of digging the lake.

== Restoration ==
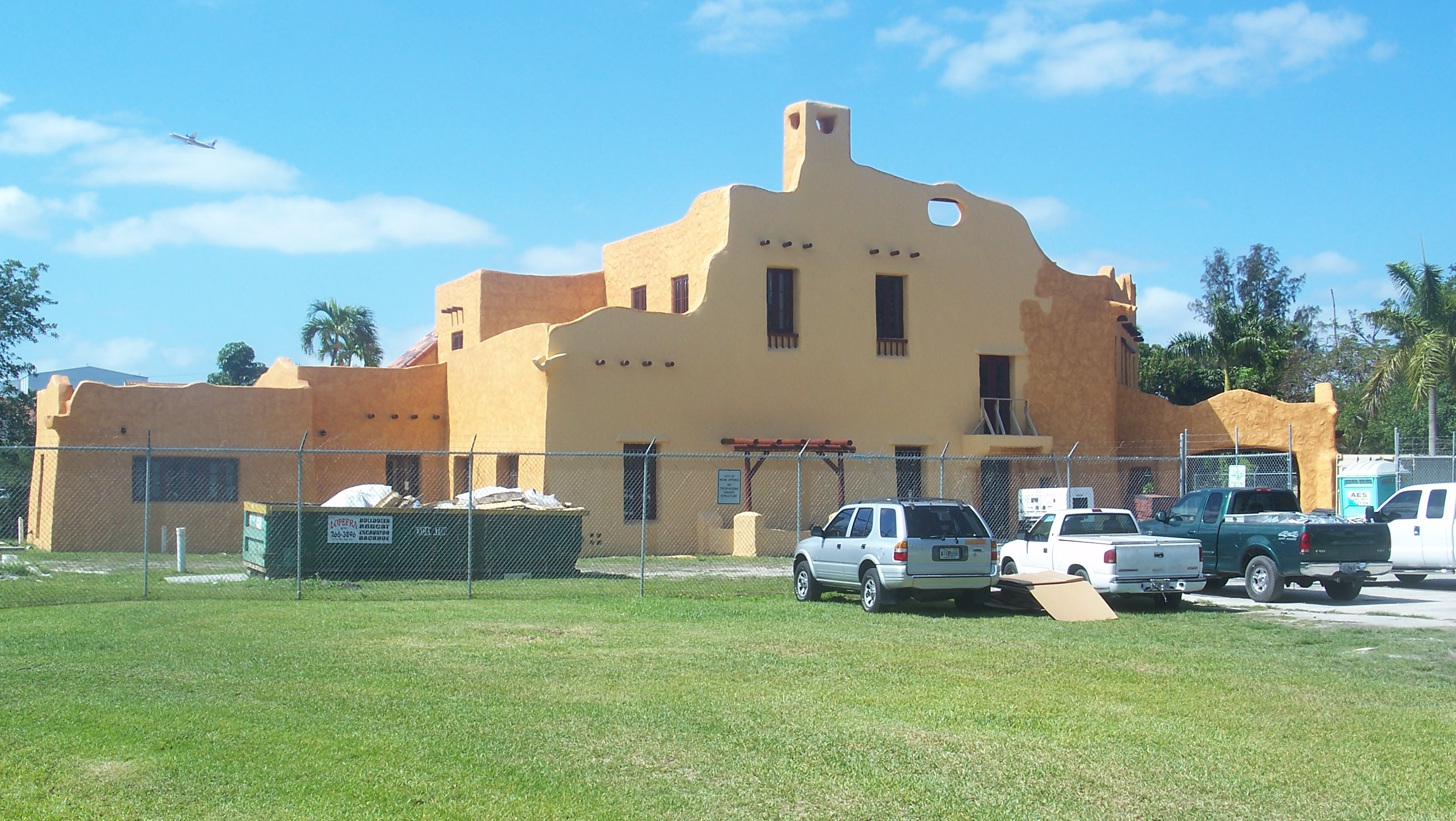

Beginning in the late 1970s, the house was subject to vandalism and a number of fires. In 1998, a public/private partnership of Curtiss Mansion, Inc. (CMI), along with the State of Florida Division of Historical Resources, Miami-Dade County, Miami-Dade County Commissioner Rebeca Sosa, the Miami-Dade County Metropolitan Planning Organization, the Florida Municipal Insurance Trust, the Miami Springs Historical Society, the City of Miami Springs and countless private and corporate donors, the mansion reopened to the public in 2012. After 17 years of grassroots efforts, including raising several million dollars, the mansion became available for historic, cultural, educational, recreational, social, civic and other community uses. Although the mansion is owned by the City of Miami Springs, CMI sustains fundraising efforts, maintenance, daily operations and oversight of the mansion and all of its activities.

== See also ==
- Miami Springs, Florida
- Opa-locka Airport
- Wright brothers
- Curtiss-Wright Corporation (aviation company founded by Glenn Curtiss but otherwise unrelated to the history of Miami Springs)

== Sources ==
- http://www.cr.nps.gov/nr/travel/aviation/gle.htm Accessed in 2006
