= Sylvester Millard House =

Historic house in Illinois, United States

- U.S. National Register of Historic Places
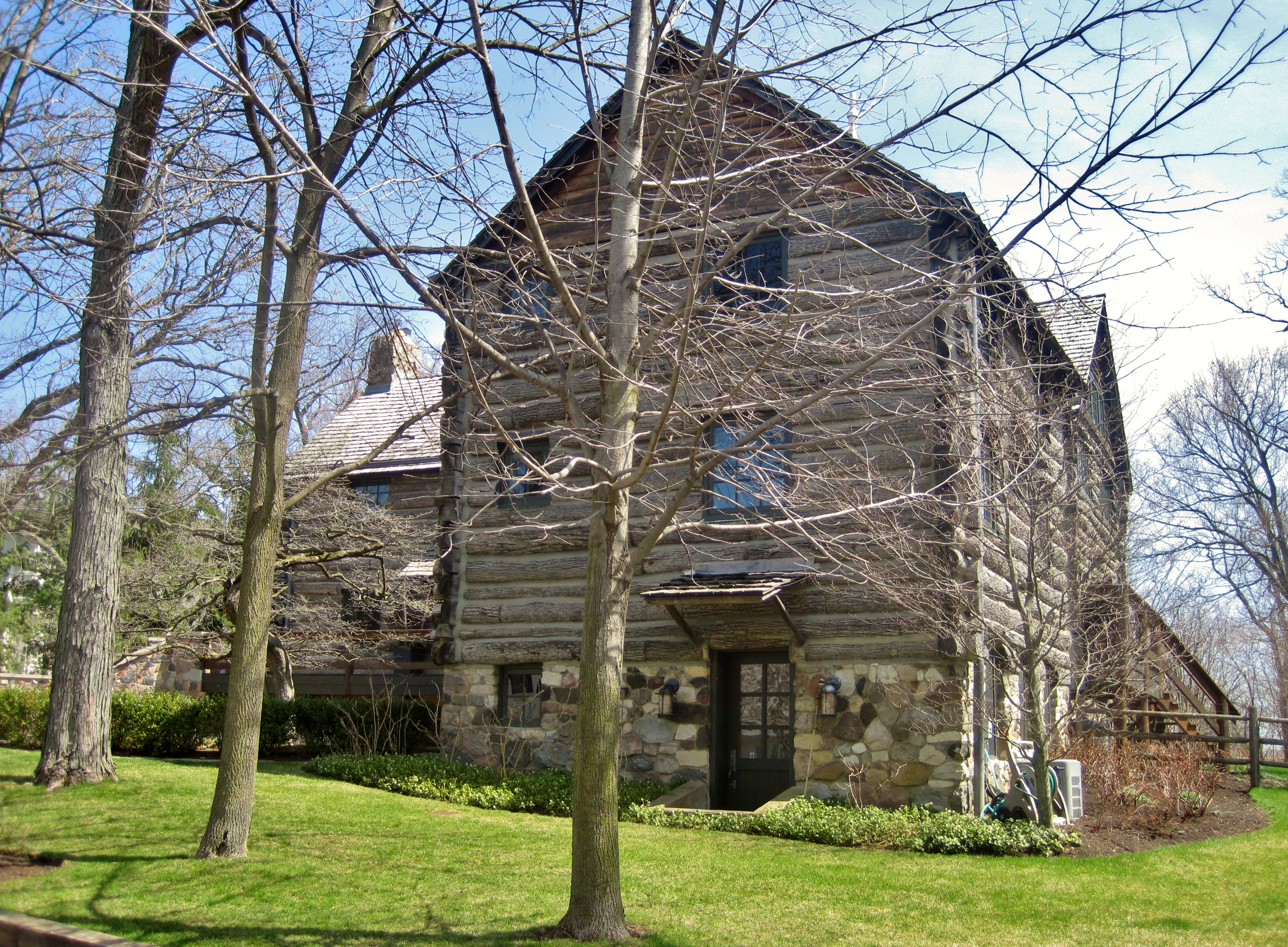

- Location within Illinois Location within the United States
- Location: 1623 Sylvester Pl., Highland Park, Illinois
- Coordinates: 42°10′56″N 87°47′2″W
- Area: 5 acres (2.0 ha)
- Built: 1893
- Architect: William W. Boyington
- Architectural style: Log house
- MPS: Highland Park MRA
- NRHP reference No.: 82002572
- Added to NRHP: September 29, 1982

The Sylvester Millard House is a historic log house in Highland Park, Illinois, United States. Built in 1893 for a Chicago lawyer, the house was designed by William W. Boyington and remained in the family until the 1990s.

== History ==
Sylvester M. Millard was raised on his father's farm in Michigan. With little previous schooling, he attended a boarding school in Lansing and the enrolled at the Agricultural College. He graduated in 1864 and moved to Milwaukee, Wisconsin to study law under Butler & Cottrell. He was admitted to the bar in 1867 and moved to Chicago, Illinois the next year. He became one of the city's most prominent lawyers, focusing on chancery litigation and counseling.

In 1878, Millard moved to Highland Park on Chicago's North Shore. He was elected alderman of the city the next year, serving until 1891. Illinois Governor Shelby Moore Cullom appointed Millard a trustee of the Illinois Industrial University, where he served for twelve years including a six-year stint as President of the Board. From 1885 to 1891, he served on the Highland Park Board of Trustees. He was a longtime member of the Union League of Chicago and the Chicago Bar Association. In 1893, Millard commissioned prominent architect William W. Boyington to design him a home that resembled a log cabin. The Millard house, which Millard called "Ravine Lodge" but which later became known as "The Log House," was built with elm logs and remained in the family for about 100 years. Millard died at the Lake Geneva Sanitarium on December 1, 1905, after a three-year illness. On September 29, 1982, the house was recognized by the National Park Service with a listing on the National Register of Historic Places. It was listed as part of the Highland Park Multiple Resource Area.

== Architecture ==
The Millard house was the first on Highland Park's east side. Its address was initially on Sycamore Lane, but in the early 20th century its driveway was rerouted and named Sylvester Place, and eventually Sylvester Place was made a public road.

Sylvester Millard House in 1917

The Log House was originally a summer home with many screened porches, but over the years the porches were enclosed and removed to create a year-round residence. A housekeeper's wing was added in 1918. An open porch on the south side of the first floor was enclosed in 1929 to create an enlarged dining area. Second-story porches were removed in 1949 to open up the first-floor porch on the east side, and windows were added to the second story at that time to bring in more light. The house was damaged in a 1977 attic fire but the top floor was rebuilt with only minor modifications. After the Millard family sold the Log House in 1998, extensive remodeling was undertaken including the addition of a massive stone stairway on the west side.

The Log House property originally encompassed 11 acres including a beach and adjacent bluff on Lake Michigan, but over the years most of the land was subdivided and sold. In the 1970s, the bluff and beach were acquired by the Highland Park Park District and were combined with the Shaffner property to create Millard Park.
