= Miami Springs, Florida =

- City
- City of Miami Springs
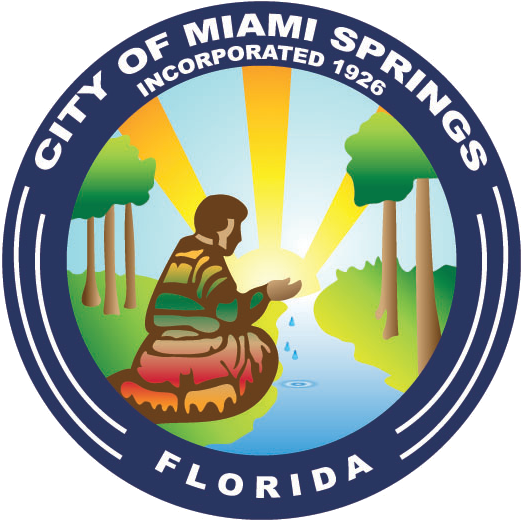
- Flag Seal
- Motto: At the Heart of it All!
- Location in Miami-Dade County and the state of Florida

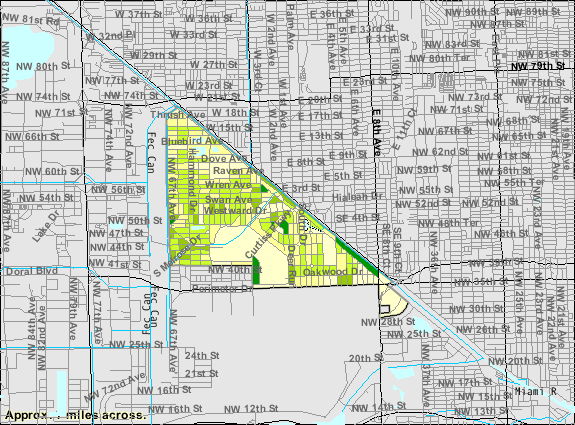
- U.S. Census Bureau map showing city limits
- Coordinates: 25°49′10″N 80°17′22″W
- Country: United States
- State: Florida
- County: Miami-Dade
- Incorporated: August 23, 1926

Government
  - Type: Council-Manager

Area
  - Total: 2.98 sq mi (7.73 km^{2})
  - Land: 2.88 sq mi (7.46 km^{2})
  - Water: 0.10 sq mi (0.27 km^{2})
- Elevation: 7 ft (2.1 m)

Population (2020)
  - Total: 13,859
  - Density: 4,814.2/sq mi (1,858.78/km^{2})
- Time zone: UTC-5 (EST)
  - Summer (DST): UTC-4 (EDT)
- ZIP codes: 33166, 33142 (Miami)
- Area codes: 305, 786, 645
- FIPS code: 12-45200
- GNIS feature ID: 2404250
- Website: www.miamisprings-fl.gov

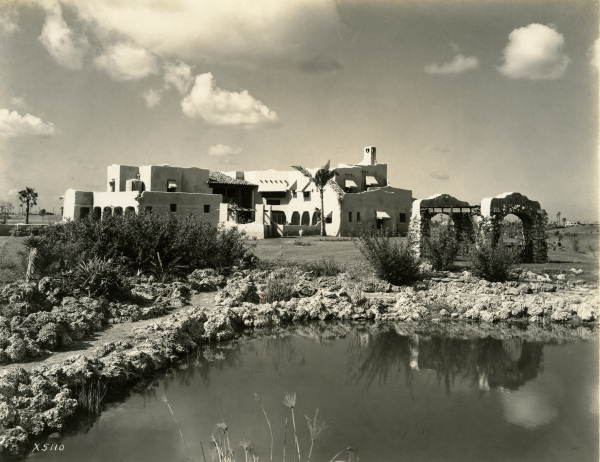
Glenn H. Curtiss Mansion and Gardens

Miami Springs is a city in Miami-Dade County, Florida, United States. The city is part of the Miami metropolitan area of South Florida. As of the 2020 census, Miami Springs had a population of 13,859.

== History ==
The city was founded by Glenn Hammond Curtiss, "The Father of Naval Aviation", and James Bright, during the famous "land boom" of the 1920s and was originally named "Country Club Estates". It, along with other cities in Miami-Dade County such as Coral Gables and Opa-locka, formed some of the first planned communities in the state. The developments were themed with a particular architecture and ambiance. Miami Springs' was a regional style of architecture called Pueblo Revival developed in the American Southwest, primarily New Mexico, and incorporating design elements of pueblo architecture. Other buildings incorporated Mission-style design. In fact, the original Hotel Country Club was designed to resemble a pueblo village.

Shortly prior to incorporation in 1926, the city was renamed after a spring located in the area which provided parts of Miami with fresh water until the mid-1990s.

== Geography ==
Miami Springs is located northwest of downtown Miami and is bordered to the northeast by the city of Hialeah and to the southwest by the village of Virginia Gardens. U.S. Route 27 runs parallel to the Miami Springs/Hialeah border. It leads east 6 miles (10 km) to its southern terminus at U.S. Route 1 in Wynwood, Miami, and northwest 4 miles (6 km) to Hialeah Gardens. To the south Miami Springs is bordered by Miami International Airport.

According to the United States Census Bureau, Miami Springs has a total area of 3.0 square miles (7.8 km^{2}). 2.9 square miles (7.5 km^{2}) of it are land and 0.1 square miles (0.26 km^{2}) of it (3.55%) are water.

The core of Miami Springs (excluding the more recently annexed areas) is roughly shaped as a triangle with three definable sides. Northwest 36th Street forms most of the southern boundary, while the Miami River canal forms the northern/eastern boundary. Finally, the Ludlam Canal and Florida East Coast Railroad Yard delimit the western boundary.

=== Surrounding areas ===
- Hialeah
- Medley Miami
- Unincorporated Miami-Dade County, Virginia Gardens Hialeah, Miami, Unincorporated Miami-Dade County
- Unincorporated Miami-Dade County Unincorporated Miami-Dade County
- Virginia Gardens, Miami International Airport

== Demographics ==
Historical population
Census	Pop.	Note	%±
1930	402		—
1940	898		123.4%
1950	5,108		468.8%
1960	11,229		119.8%
1970	13,279		18.3%
1980	12,350		−7.0%
1990	13,268		7.4%
2000	13,712		3.3%
2010	13,809		0.7%
2020	13,859		0.4%
U.S. Decennial Census

=== 2020 census ===
Miami Springs racial composition (Hispanics excluded from racial categories) (NH = Non-Hispanic)
Race	Number	Percentage
White (NH)	2,526	18.23%
Black or African American (NH)	107	0.77%
Native American or Alaska Native (NH)	13	0.09%
Asian (NH)	131	0.95%
Pacific Islander or Native Hawaiian (NH)	2	0.01%
Some other race (NH)	42	0.30%
Two or more races/Multiracial (NH)	147	1.06%
Hispanic or Latino (any race)	10,891	78.58%
Total	13,859	

As of the 2020 census, Miami Springs had a population of 13,859. The median age was 45.5 years. 18.4% of residents were under the age of 18 and 19.4% of residents were 65 years of age or older. For every 100 females there were 93.9 males, and for every 100 females age 18 and over there were 91.6 males age 18 and over.

100.0% of residents lived in urban areas, while 0.0% lived in rural areas.

There were 5,156 households in Miami Springs, of which 32.3% had children under the age of 18 living in them. Of all households, 49.5% were married-couple households, 17.0% were households with a male householder and no spouse or partner present, and 26.1% were households with a female householder and no spouse or partner present. About 22.2% of all households were made up of individuals and 10.5% had someone living alone who was 65 years of age or older.

There were 5,397 housing units, of which 4.5% were vacant. The homeowner vacancy rate was 0.7% and the rental vacancy rate was 4.0%.

According to 2020 ACS 5-year estimates, there were 3,204 families residing in the city.

=== 2010 census ===
Miami Springs Demographics
2010 Census	Miami Springs	Miami-Dade County	Florida
Total population	13,809	2,496,435	18,801,310
Population, percent change, 2000 to 2010	+0.7%	+10.8%	+17.6%
Population density	4,795.4/sq mi	1,315.5/sq mi	350.6/sq mi
White or Caucasian (including White Hispanic)	93.4%	73.8%	75.0%
(Non-Hispanic White or Caucasian)	26.3%	15.4%	57.9%
Black or African-American	1.6%	18.9%	16.0%
Hispanic or Latino (of any race)	71.2%	65.0%	22.5%
Asian	1.2%	1.5%	2.4%
Native American or Native Alaskan	0.2%	0.2%	0.4%
Pacific Islander or Native Hawaiian	0.0%	0.0%	0.1%
Two or more races (Multiracial)	1.7%	2.4%	2.5%
Some Other Race	1.9%	3.2%	3.6%

As of the 2010 United States census, there were 13,809 people, 4,988 households, and 3,437 families residing in the city.

=== 2000 census ===
In 2000, 33.6% had children under the age of 18 living with them, 52.0% were married couples living together, 12.2% had a female householder with no husband present, and 30.9% were non-families. 24.8% of all households were made up of individuals, and 8.2% had someone living alone who was 65 years of age or older. The average household size was 2.64 and the average family size was 3.16.

In 2000, the city population was spread out, with 22.9% under the age of 18, 7.2% from 18 to 24, 31.2% from 25 to 44, 23.2% from 45 to 64, and 15.5% who were 65 years of age or older. The median age was 39 years. For every 100 females, there were 92.5 males. For every 100 females age 18 and over, there were 88.6 males.

In 2000, the median income for a household in the city was $50,000, and the median income for a family was $56,892. Males had a median income of $37,176 versus $30,823 for females. The per capita income for the city was $22,963. About 6.9% of families and 9.7% of the population were below the poverty line, including 9.8% of those under age 18 and 8.6% of those age 65 or over.

As of 2000, speakers of Spanish as a first language made up 63.21% of residents, and English accounted for 35.49% of the population. Other languages spoken as the main language were well below 1.00%.

== History ==
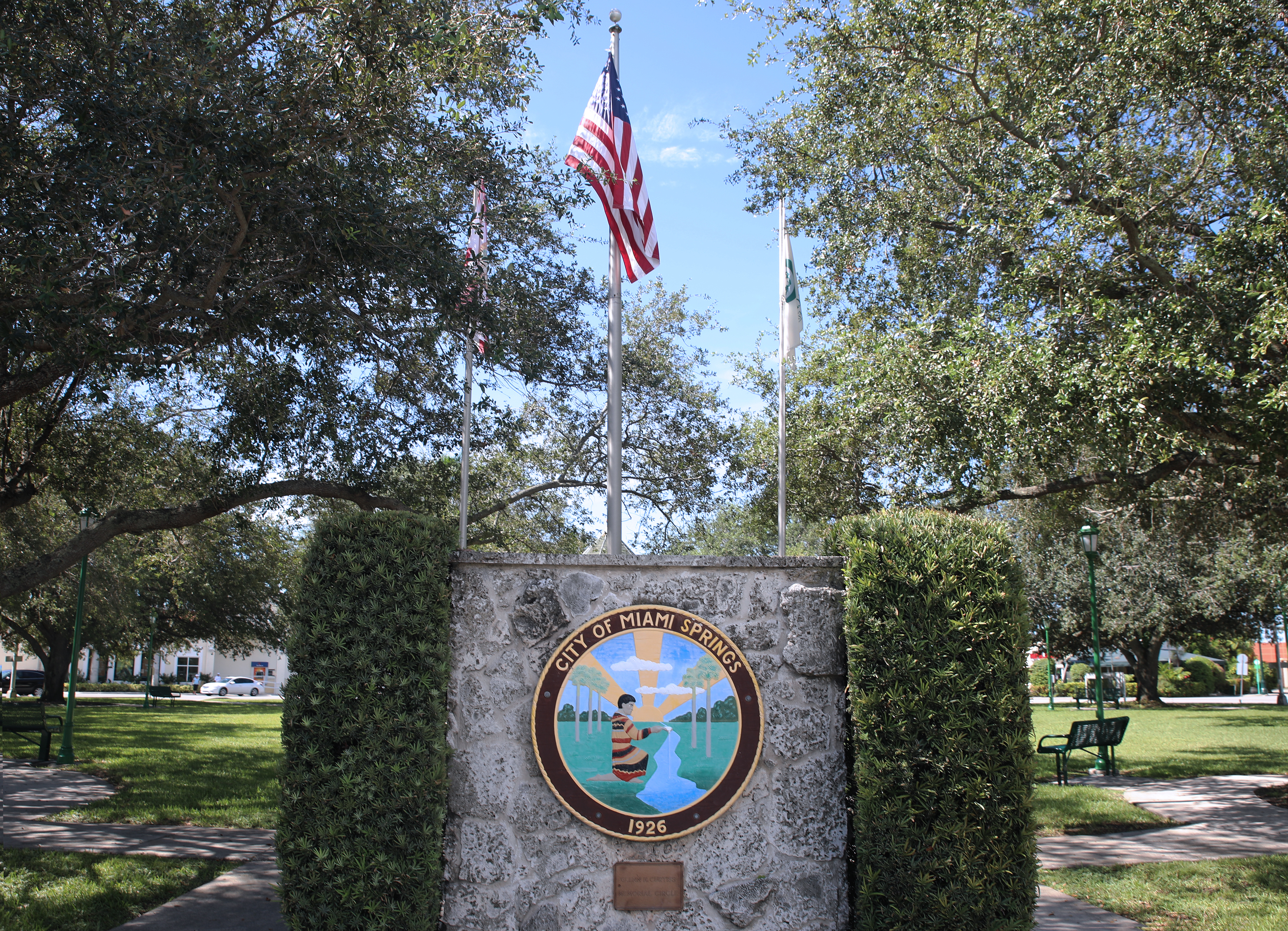
City of Miami Springs, Florida

Miami Springs was founded by Glenn Curtiss, an aviation pioneer, and thus, the fate of the city has always been intertwined with the aviation industry, particularly since Miami International Airport (MIA) is located just south of the city on the southern border of NW 36th Street. The airline industry brought many residents from airline crew bases, as well as employment opportunities at the airport, which brought much prosperity to the city. This dependence, however, left the city vulnerable. The sudden 1991 collapses of both Eastern Airlines and Pan American World Airways left many Miami Springs residents unemployed and unable to afford living in the neighborhood. Given that the businesses in Miami Springs had always relied upon the large disposable incomes of the employees of the large airline carriers, the bankruptcy of both corporations in the same year created a chain reaction, eventually causing many small businesses to close their doors. Despite the closure of the airlines, from a residential standpoint, Miami Springs remained strong. The city is often seen as blessedly isolated from the perceived turbulence of the rest of Miami-Dade County. This has continued to provide ample replacements for the older residents who are lost over time. Nonetheless, the legacy of the airline closures remains. Residential millage taxation rates hover near the state mandated maximum.

== Economy ==
The Consulate-General of Bolivia in Miami is located in Suite 505 at 700 South Royal Poinciana Boulevard in Miami Springs.

== Significant historical landmarks ==
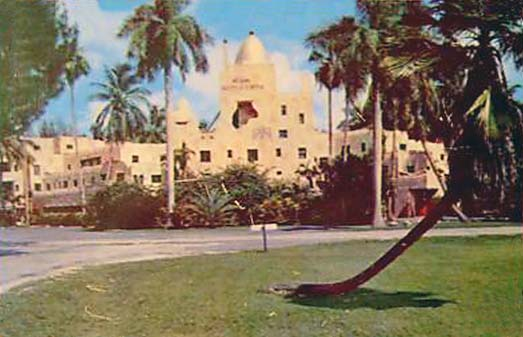
Miami Sanitorium in a 1954 postcard

Curtiss Mansion is a Pueblo style home that belonged to city founder Glenn Curtiss. Beginning in the late 1970s, the house was subject to vandalism and a number of fires.

Fair Haven Nursing Home is one of the oldest buildings in Miami Springs and is built in the pueblo style favored during the initial development. The building was designed by architect Bernard E. Muller. It was designated a Miami Springs Historic Site in 1984.

Back in 1927, Fair Havens Retirement Center was Miami Springs founder Glenn Curtiss’ masterpiece. But it was never added to the National Registry of Historic Places, according to documents obtained from the U.S. Department of Interior’s National Park Service by Miami Herald reporter Theo Karantsalis. [Miami Springs landmark sold for $29 million. Its historic designation is in question

A simple timeline of events:

- 1926 – Country Club Estates incorporated
- 1927 – Hotel Country Club officially opened
- 1930 – Miami-Battle Creek Sanitarium opened
- 1942 – Sanitarium leased to US Army
- 1945 – Sanitarium reopens
- 1959 – Miami-Battle Creek Sanitarium becomes The Palm Spa
- 1962 – Renamed Fair Havens Center
- 2020 – Fair Havens sold. Miami Herald shows site not deemed historic.

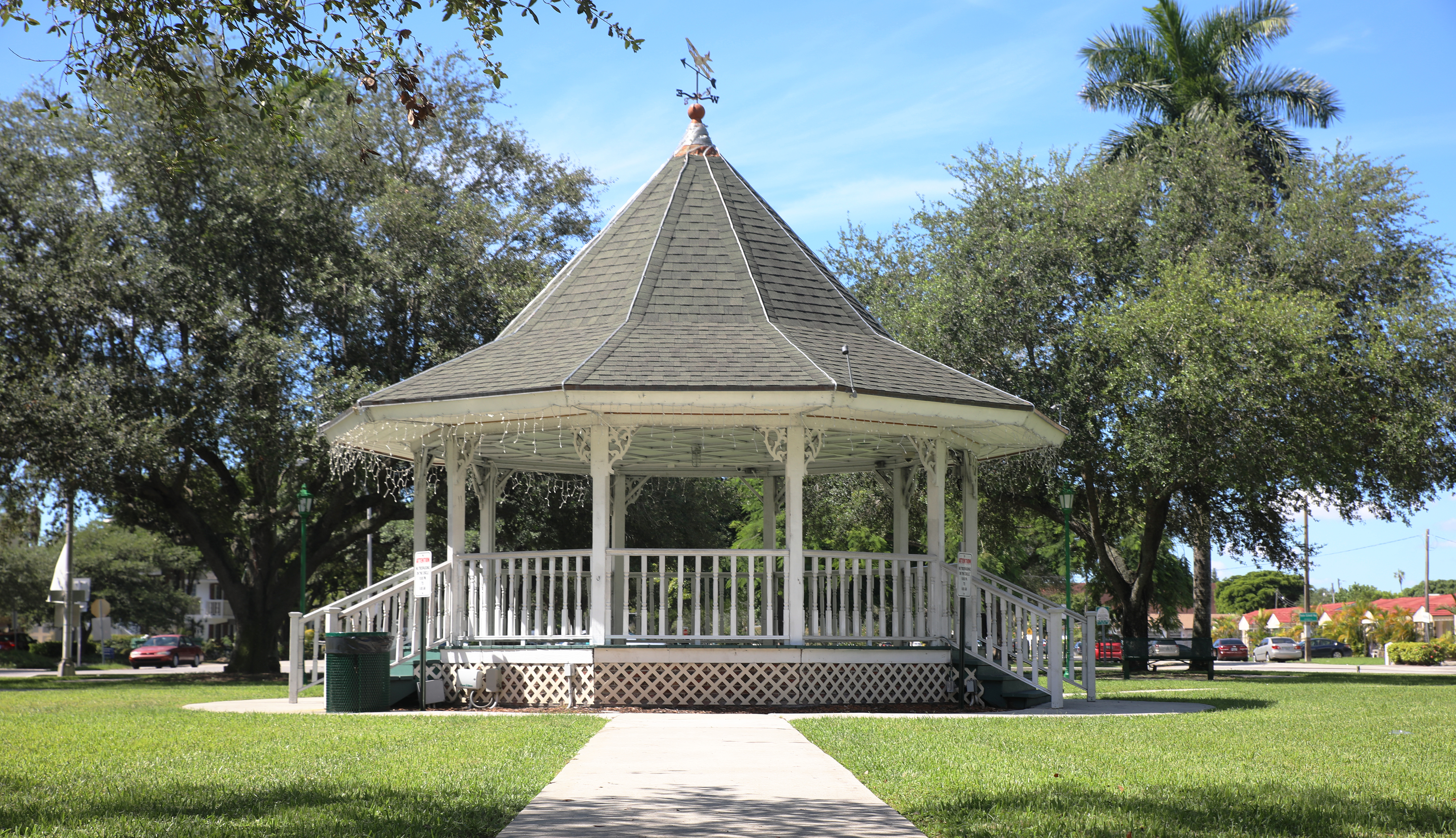
Glenn H. Curtiss Memorial Circle, Miami Springs, Florida

Before becoming a nursing home, the building served as the Hotel Country Club. The hotel was built by Glenn Curtiss and partners, and was intended to promote the development of the then-new Country Club Estates. It was furnished in a Southwestern style, with Navajo rugs on the floor and handcrafted solid mahogany furniture. In 1929, after the crash, Curtiss sold the hotel to his friend John Harvey Kellogg, who renamed it the "Miami Battle Creek Sanitarium" and operated for many years. During World War II, it served the Air Transport Command as a hospital for recuperating military personnel. Later it became a home for the elderly, which it still is today.

A 'Virtual Tour of Historic Miami Springs' can be done on the City of Miami Springs website: https://www.miamisprings-fl.gov/tour

== Education ==
Miami Springs High School

The city of Miami Springs is served by a sizeable number of public and private educational institutions.

The city is part of the Miami-Dade County Public Schools System (M-DCPS), and all public schools under this system follow guidelines set forth by the Florida Department of Education. Miami Springs is served publicly by:

- Miami Springs Senior High School
- Miami Springs Middle School
- Miami Springs Elementary School
- Springview Elementary School

Two charter schools serve Miami Springs:

- Glenn Curtiss Elementary AIE Charter School (Academy for International Education) provides K–8 education.
- ISAAC Academy (Integrated Science and Asian Culture) provides K–8 education.

Private schools in Miami Springs are largely provided by local religious institutions:

- All Angels Episcopal Church operates All Angels Academy for children of a similar age group.
- Blessed Trinity Catholic School of the Roman Catholic Archdiocese of Miami is located in nearby Virginia Gardens, and provides K–8 education.
- Grace Lutheran Church operates Grace Lutheran Learning Center for children of a similar age group.
