= List of communities in Miami-Dade County, Florida =

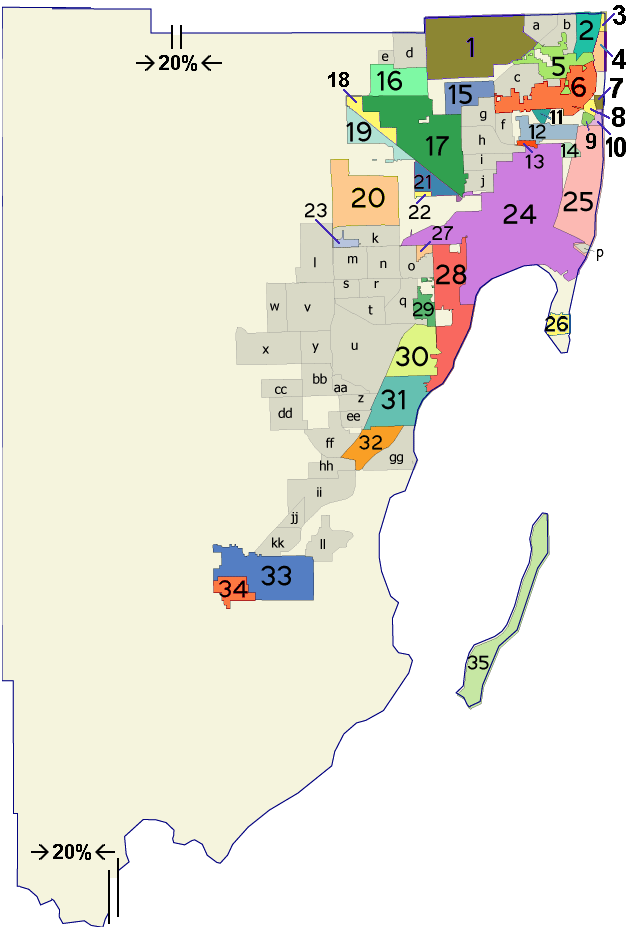
Map of the municipalities (colored) and census-designated places (gray) of Miami-Dade County.

Communities in Miami-Dade County, all located in the county's eastern half, include 34 municipalities (19 cities, 6 towns and 9 villages), 37 census-designated places, and several unincorporated communities. The county seat is Miami, which is also the most populous city.

== Municipalities ==
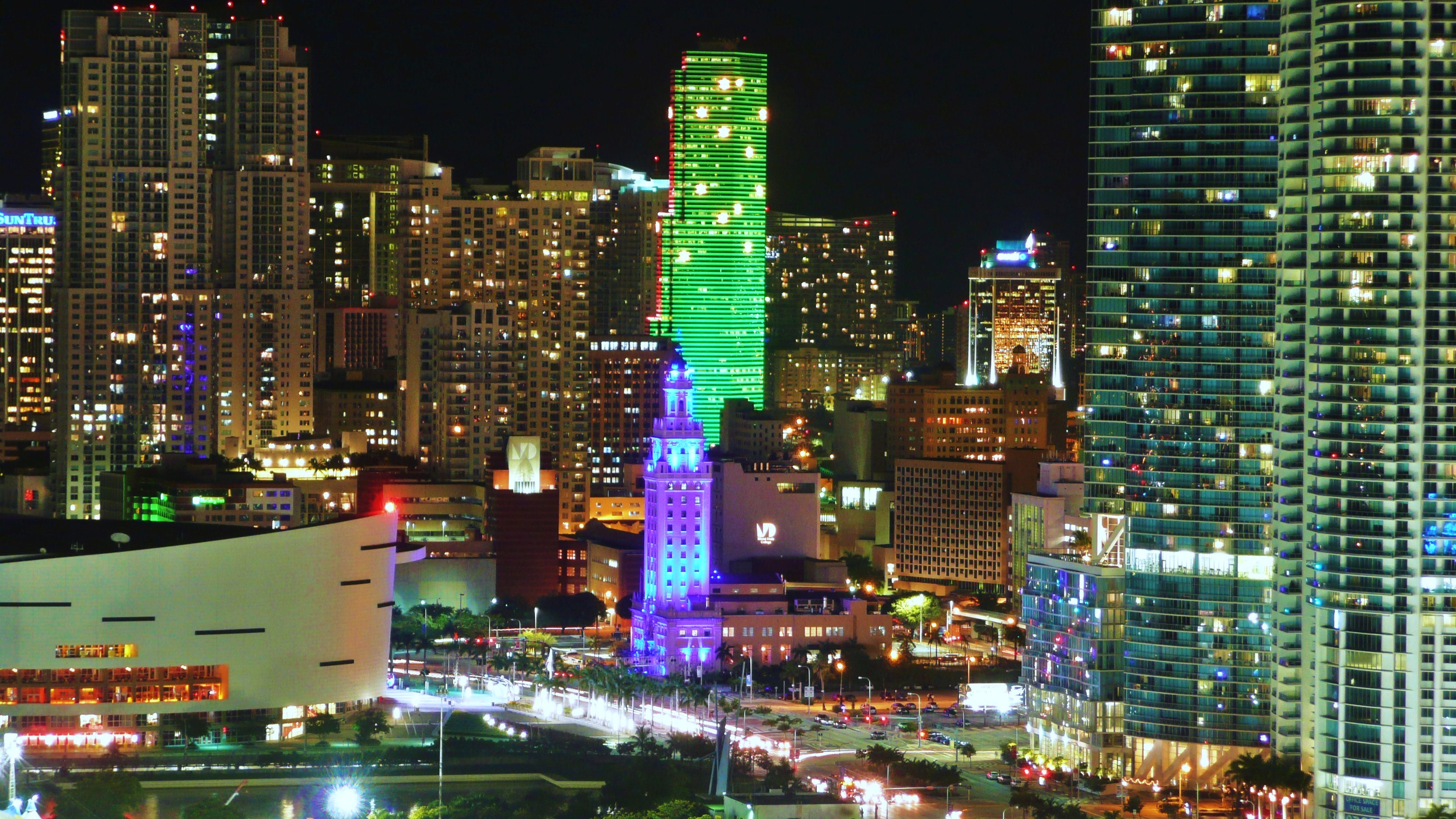
Skyline of Downtown Miami

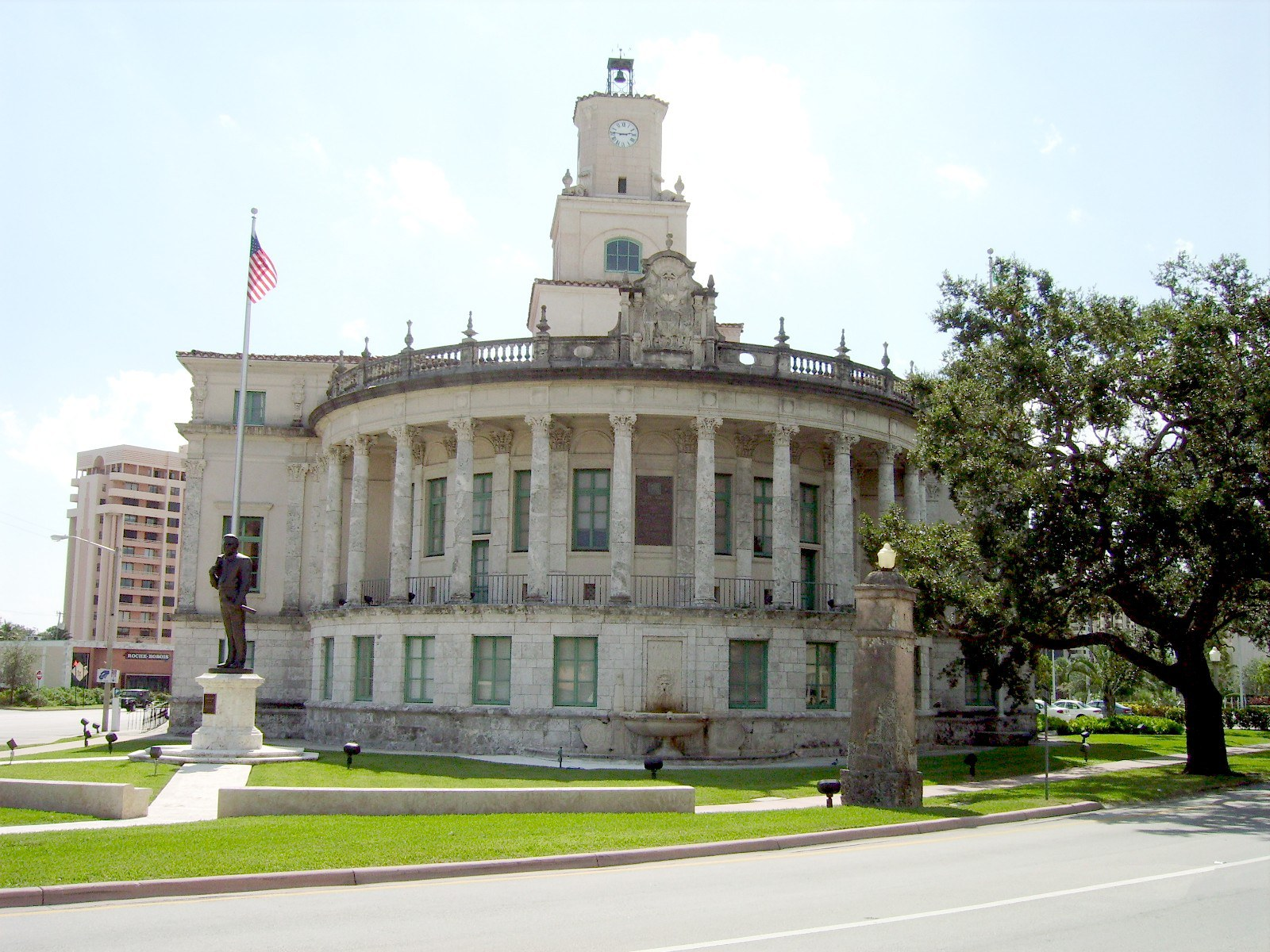
Coral Gables

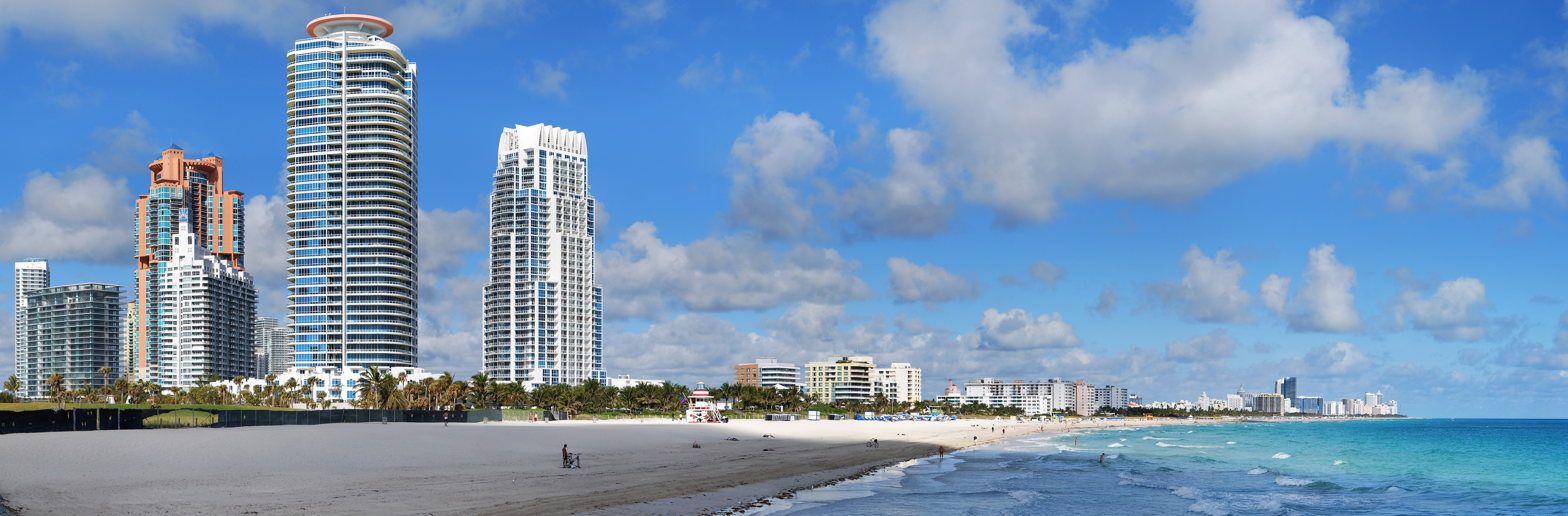
Miami Beach

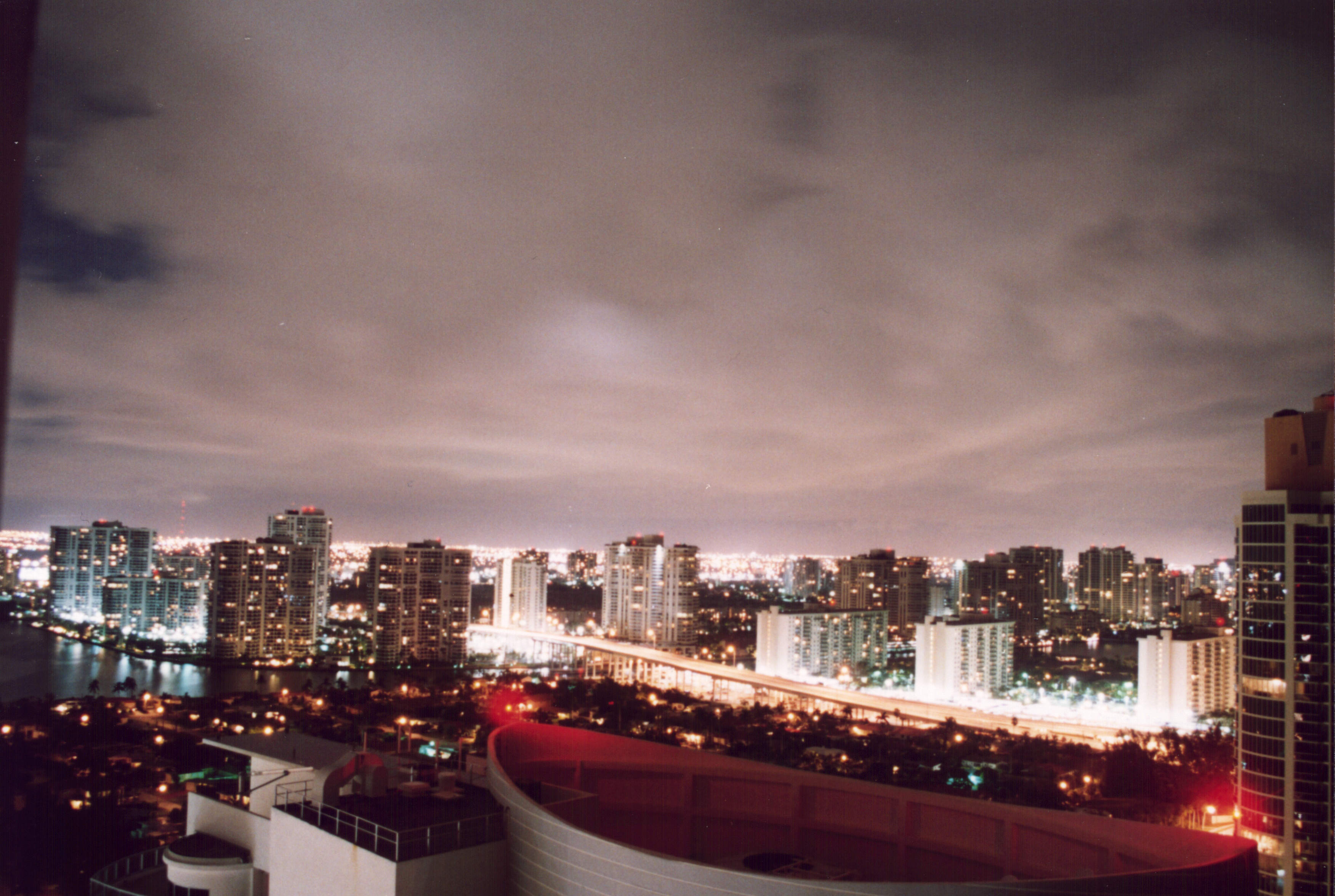
Aventura

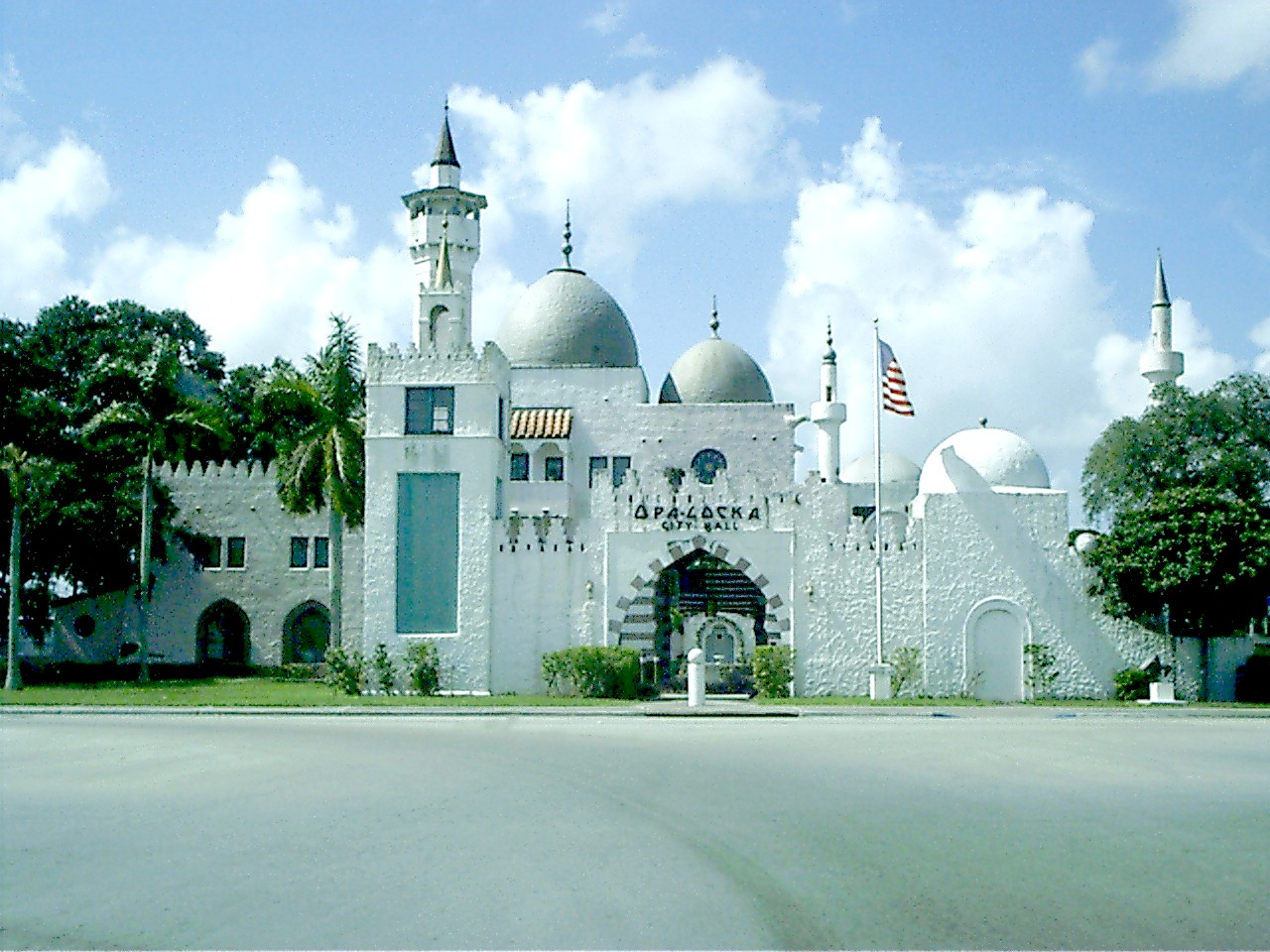
Opa-locka

Miami-Dade County has nineteen cities, six towns, and nine villages. No apparent differences in government structure or population exist between these three categories, however. The communities below are numbered according to the provided image.

Municipality populations are based on the 2020 US Census using their QuickFacts with 5,000 residents and above, while municipalities under 5,000 people are based on their US Decennial Census.

#	Incorporated Community	Designation	Date incorporated	Population
1	Miami Gardens	City	May 13, 2003	111,640
2	Aventura	City	November 7, 1995	40,242
3	Golden Beach	Town	1929	961
4	Sunny Isles Beach	City	1997	22,342
5	North Miami Beach	City	1927	43,676
6	North Miami	City	May 27, 1953	60,191
7	Bal Harbour	Village	June 16, 1947	3,093
8	Bay Harbor Islands	Town	April 1947	5,922
9	Indian Creek	Village	1939	84
10	Surfside	Town	May 18, 1935	5,689
11	Biscayne Park	Village	1933	3,117
12	Miami Shores	Village	January 2, 1932	11,567
13	El Portal	Village	December 7, 1937	1,986
14	North Bay Village	City	1945	8,159
15	Opa-locka	City	1926	16,463
16	Miami Lakes	Town	December 5, 2000	30,467
17	Hialeah	City	1925	223,109
18	Hialeah Gardens	City	December 1948	23,068
19	Medley	Town	1949	1,056
20	Doral	City	June 24, 2003	75,874
21	Miami Springs	City	1926	13,859
22	Virginia Gardens	Village	July 10, 1947	2,364
23	Sweetwater	City	1941	19,363
24	Miami	City	July 28, 1896	442,241
25	Miami Beach	City	March 26, 1915	82,890
26	Key Biscayne	Village	1991	14,809
27	West Miami	City	1947	7,233
28	Coral Gables	City	1925	49,248
29	South Miami	City	June 24, 1927	12,026
30	Pinecrest	Village	March 12, 1996	18,388
31	Palmetto Bay	Village	September 10, 2002	24,439
32/gg	Cutler Bay	Town	November 9, 2005	45,425
33	Homestead	City	1913	80,737
34	Florida City	City	1914	13,085

The current unincorporated place of Islandia (#35 in the map) was a city founded on December 6, 1960, with a 2010 census population of 18, but was disincorporated on March 16, 2012, and will no longer appear on the US Census.

== Census-designated places ==
As of the 2020 United States Census, there are 37 census-designated places in Miami-Dade County. The populations listed below are based on that census. The CDP's are lettered according to the image above.

#	Census-designated place	Population
a	Ives Estates	25,005
b	Ojus	19,673
c	Golden Glades	32,499
d	Country Club	49,967
e	Palm Springs North	5,030
f	Pinewood	17,246
g	Westview	9,923
h	West Little River	34,128
i	Gladeview	14,927
j	Brownsville	16,583
k	Fountainebleau	59,870
l	Tamiami	54,212
m/n	Westchester	56,384
o	Coral Terrace	23,142
p	Fisher Island	561
q	Glenvar Heights	20,786
r	Olympia Heights	12,873
s	Westwood Lakes	11,373
t	Sunset	15,912
u	Kendall	80,241
v	Kendale Lakes	55,646
w	Kendall West	36,536
x	The Hammocks	59,480
y	The Crossings	23,276
z	Palmetto Estates	13,498
aa	Richmond Heights	8,944
bb	Three Lakes	16,540
cc	Country Walk	16,951
dd	Richmond West	35,884
ee	West Perrine	10,602
ff	South Miami Heights	36,770
hh	Goulds	11,446
ii	Princeton	39,308
jj	Naranja	13,509
kk	Leisure City	26,324
ll	Homestead Base	999

The former CDP of Lakes by the Bay (gg in the map) is now part of the Town of Cutler Bay, and the former CDP of University Park (m in the map) is now part of the Westchester CDP.

== Other unincorporated communities ==
The boundaries of these communities are loose and may overlap with each other as well as with the census-designated places.

The degree of development in these areas varies considerably. For instance, Frog City is a ghost town, while Little Gables is a densely populated suburban area and Redland is a rural but significantly populated region.

- Coopertown
- Frog City
- Islandia
- Little Gables
- High Pines
- Pennsuco
- Peters
- Ponce-Davis
- Redland
- Silver Palm
- University Park
- West End
- West Kendall

== City districts and neighborhoods ==
District / neighborhood	Municipality
Alhambra Heights	North Miami
Allen Park	North Miami Beach
Andover	Miami Gardens
Arch Creek Highlands	North Miami
Biscayne Gardens	Golden Glades
Biscayne Park North	North Miami
Bunche Park	Miami Gardens
Carol City	Miami Gardens
Central	North Miami
Central East	North Miami
Central North	North Miami
Central Northeast	North Miami
Central Northwest	North Miami
Central South	North Miami
Central West	North Miami
City Center	North Miami Beach
City Center of North Miami	North Miami
Coral Way Village	Westchester
Cutler	Palmetto Bay
Dadeland	Kendall
East Perrine	Palmetto Bay
Eastern Shores	North Miami Beach
Green-Mar Acres	Kendall
Golden Glades East	North Miami
Golden Glades South	North Miami
Hawley Heights	Kendall
Highland Village	North Miami Beach
Howard	Kendall
John & Wales University North Miami	North Miami
Keystone Point / Amber Creek East	North Miami
Lake Lucerne	Miami Gardens
Lakes by the Bay	Cutler Bay
Mid-Beach	Miami Beach
North Beach	Miami Beach
Norwood (Norland)	Miami Gardens
Oakgrove	North Miami Beach
Opa-locka North	Miami Gardens
Pickwick	North Miami Beach
Saga Bay	Cutler Bay
San Souci	North Miami
Scott Lake	Miami Gardens
Skylake	North Miami Beach
South Beach	Miami Beach
Sunray East	North Miami Beach
Sunray West	North Miami Beach
Uleta	North Miami Beach
Washington Park	North Miami Beach
West Kendall	Kendall
Westside Sunkist Gove	North Miami
Westside Sunkist Grove North	North Miami
Windward	North Miami Beach
Wynwood	Miami

== See also ==
- C-9 Basin
- Miami metropolitan area
- Category:Cities in Miami-Dade County, Florida
- Category:Villages in Miami-Dade County, Florida
- Category:Towns in Miami-Dade County, Florida
- Category:Census-designated places in Miami-Dade County, Florida
- Category:Former census-designated places in Miami-Dade County, Florida
- Category:Unincorporated communities in Miami-Dade County, Florida
- Category:Neighborhoods in Miami
- Category:Neighborhoods in Miami-Dade County, Florida
