= Florida's 27th congressional district =

U.S. House district for Florida

Coordinates: 25°35′45″N 80°20′30″W

- Map of district boundaries
- Representative: María Elvira Salazar; R–Miami
- Area: 344 mi^{2} (890 km^{2})
- Distribution: 99.98% urban; 0.02% rural
- Population (2025): 798,661
- Median household income: $86,115
- Ethnicity: 73.6% Hispanic; 17.2% White; 4.8% Black; 1.9% Asian; 1.9% Two or more races; 0.6% other
- Cook PVI: R+6

Florida's 27th congressional district is an electoral district for the U.S. Congress, and was first created in South Florida during 2012, effective January 2013, as a result of the 2010 census. The first candidates ran in the 2012 House elections, and the winner was seated for the 113th Congress on January 3, 2013.

The 27th district is located entirely within Miami-Dade County. The district includes parts of Miami, south of the Dolphin Expressway, including Downtown and Little Havana, Coral Gables, South Miami, Pinecrest, Kendall, Palmetto Bay, and Cutler Bay. In the 2020 redistricting cycle, Miami Beach was drawn out of the district, and into the 24th district, while several places in unincorporated Miami-Dade County, such as Palmetto Estates and parts of Fontainebleau and Westchester, were drawn into the 27th district. It is the wealthiest congressional district in Florida and the 90th wealthiest in the United States, with 17.2 percent of households earning over $200,000, per a 2024 study.

The district is currently represented by Republican María Elvira Salazar, serving since January 12, 2021. She was first elected in 2020, after defeating Representative Donna Shalala in a rematch of the 2018 race.

== Recent election results from statewide races ==
Year	Office	Results
2008	President	McCain 51% - 48%
2010	Senate	Rubio 54% - 18%
2010	Governor	Scott 50.5% - 49.5%
2010	Attorney General	Bondi 52% - 45%
2010	Chief Financial Officer	Atwater 58% - 39%
2012	President	Obama 52% - 48%
2012	Senate	Nelson 55% - 45%
2014	Governor	Crist 51% - 49%
2016	President	Clinton 57% - 40%
2016	Senate	Rubio 50% - 48%
2018	Senate	Nelson 54% - 45%
2018	Governor	Gillum 53% - 46%
2018	Attorney General	Shaw 52% - 46%
2018	Chief Financial Officer	Ring 52% - 47%
2020	President	Trump 49.9% - 49.6%
2022	Senate	Rubio 57% - 42%
2022	Governor	DeSantis 58% - 41%
2022	Attorney General	Moody 57% - 43%
2022	Chief Financial Officer	Patronis 58% - 42%
2024	President	Trump 57% - 42%
2024	Senate	Scott 56% - 42%

== Composition ==
For the 118th and successive Congresses (based on redistricting following the 2020 census), the district contains all or portions of the following counties and communities:

Miami-Dade County (21)

Coral Gables, Coral Terrace, The Crossings (part; also 28th), Cutler Bay, Fountainebleau (part; also 28th), Glenvar Heights, Kendall, Key Biscayne, Miami (part; also 24th and 26th), Olympia Heights, Palmetto Bay, Palmetto Estates, Pinecrest, South Miami, South Miami Heights (part; also 28th), Sunset, Three Lakes (part; also 28th), Westchester (part; also 28th), West Miami, West Perrine, Westwood Lakes

== List of members representing the district ==
Member	Party	Years	Cong ress	Electoral history	Geography
District created January 3, 2013
Ileana Ros-Lehtinen (Homestead)	Republican	January 3, 2013 – January 3, 2019	113th 114th 115th	Redistricted from the 18th district and re-elected in 2012. Re-elected in 2014. Re-elected in 2016. Retired.	2013–2017 Miami-Dade
Ileana Ros-Lehtinen (Homestead)	Republican	January 3, 2013 – January 3, 2019	113th 114th 115th	Redistricted from the 18th district and re-elected in 2012. Re-elected in 2014. Re-elected in 2016. Retired.	2017–2023 Miami-Dade
Donna Shalala (Coral Gables)	Democratic	January 3, 2019 – January 3, 2021	116th	Elected in 2018. Lost re-election.	2017–2023 Miami-Dade
María Elvira Salazar (Miami)	Republican	January 3, 2021 – present	117th 118th 119th	Elected in 2020; Re-elected in 2022. Re-elected in 2024. Re-elected in 2026.	2017–2023 Miami-Dade
María Elvira Salazar (Miami)	Republican	January 3, 2021 – present	117th 118th 119th	Elected in 2020; Re-elected in 2022. Re-elected in 2024. Re-elected in 2026.	2023–2027: Miami-Dade

== Election results ==
=== 2012 ===
Florida's 27th congressional district, 2012
Party	Candidate	Votes	%
Republican	Ileana Ros-Lehtinen (incumbent)	138,488	60.2
Democratic	Manny Yevancey	85,020	36.9
Independent	Thomas Joe Cruz-Wiggins	6,663	2.9
Total votes		230,171	100.0
Republican hold			

=== 2014 ===
Ileana Ros-Lehtinen ran unopposed.

Florida's 27th congressional district, 2014
Party	Candidate	Votes	%
Republican	Ileana Ros-Lehtinen (incumbent)		100.0
Total votes			100.0
Republican hold			

=== 2016 ===
2016 Florida's 27th congressional district election
Party	Candidate	Votes	%
Republican	Ileana Ros-Lehtinen	157,917	54.9
Democratic	Scott Fuhrman	129,760	45.1
Total votes		287,677	100.0
Republican hold			

=== 2018 ===
2018 Florida's 27th congressional district election
Party	Candidate	Votes	%	±%
Democratic	Donna Shalala	130,743	51.8	+6.7
Republican	Maria Elvira Salazar	115,588	45.8	−9.1
Independent	Mayra Joli	6,255	2.5	+2.5
Total votes		252,586	100.0	
Democratic gain from Republican				

=== 2020 ===
2020 Florida's 27th congressional district election
Party	Candidate	Votes	%	±%
Republican	Maria Elvira Salazar	176,141	51.4	+5.6
Democratic	Donna Shalala (incumbent)	166,758	48.6	−3.2
Write-in	Frank E. Polo	76	0.0	+0.0
Total votes		342,975	100.0	
Republican gain from Democratic				

=== 2022 ===
2022 Florida's 27th congressional district election
Party	Candidate	Votes	%	±%
Republican	Maria Elvira Salazar (incumbent)	136,038	57.3	+5.9
Democratic	Annette Taddeo	101,404	42.7	−5.9
Total votes		237,442	100.0	
Republican hold		Swing	+5.9	

=== 2024 ===
2024 Florida's 27th congressional district election
Party	Candidate	Votes	%	±%
Republican	Maria Elvira Salazar (incumbent)	199,159	60.4	+3.1
Democratic	Lucia Baez-Geller	130,708	39.6	−3.1
Total votes		329,867	100.0	
Republican hold		Swing	+3.1	
