= Miami-Dade Fire Rescue Department =

Municipal fire brigade in the Miami-Dade County

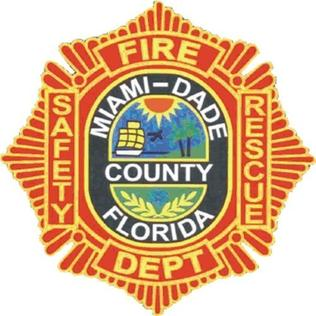

Operational area
- Country: United States
- State: Florida
- County: Miami-Dade
- Coordinates: 25°46′N 80°12′W

Agency overview
- Established: 1935
- Annual calls: 303,000 (2024)
- Employees: 3220
- Staffing: Career
- Fire chief: Raied S. Jadallah
- EMS level: ALS
- IAFF: 1403
- Motto: "Always Ready, Proud to Serve"

Facilities and equipment
- Divisions: 20
- Battalions: 14
- Stations: 73
- Engines: 45
- Trucks: 14
- Platforms: 4
- Squads: 1
- Rescues: 69
- Ambulances: 5
- HAZMAT: 7
- USAR: 1
- Airport crash: 6
- Helicopters: 4
- Fireboats: 2
- Light and air: 1

Website
- Official website
- IAFF website

The Miami-Dade Fire Rescue Department (MDFR) provides fire protection and emergency medical services to the unincorporated parts of Miami-Dade County, Florida, along with 30 municipalities located within the county. In all the department is responsible for 1,883 square miles (4,880 km^{2}) of land.

The R. David Paulison Fire Rescue Headquarters is located in Doral.

== Air Rescue ==
Four helicopters are housed at MDFR fire stations located at Miami Executive Airport and Miami-Opa Locka Executive Airport.

== Urban Search And Rescue (USAR) Task Force 1 ==
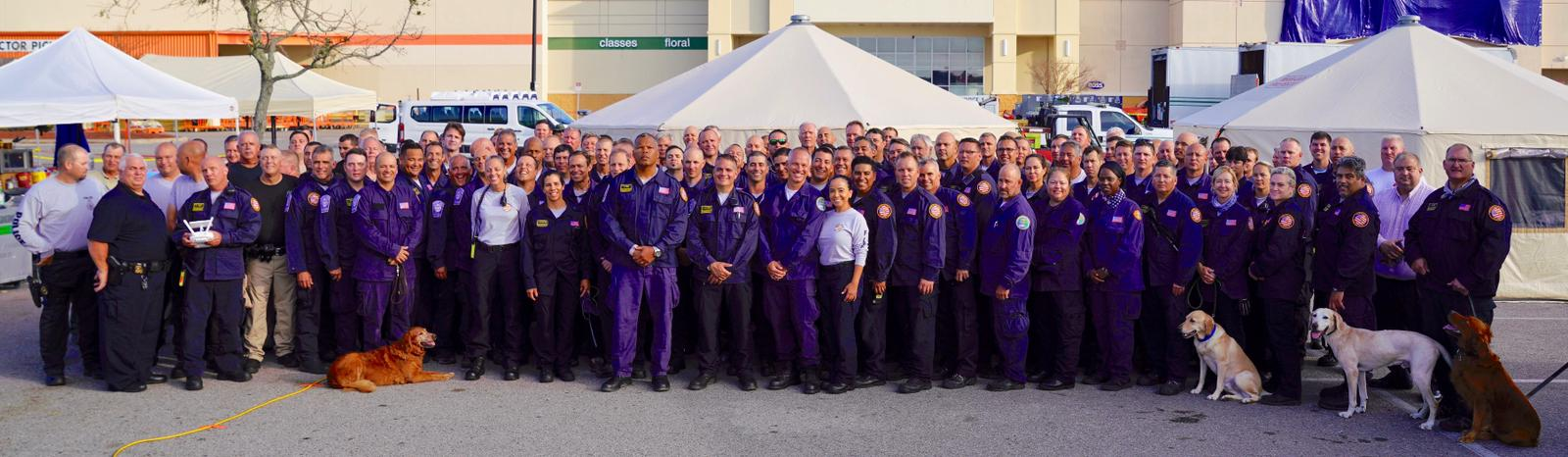
MDFR FLTF-1

The Miami-Dade Fire Department is the founding member of one of Florida's two FEMA Urban Search and Rescue Task Forces. Florida Task Force 1 (FL-TF1) works in disaster response.

== Stations and apparatus ==
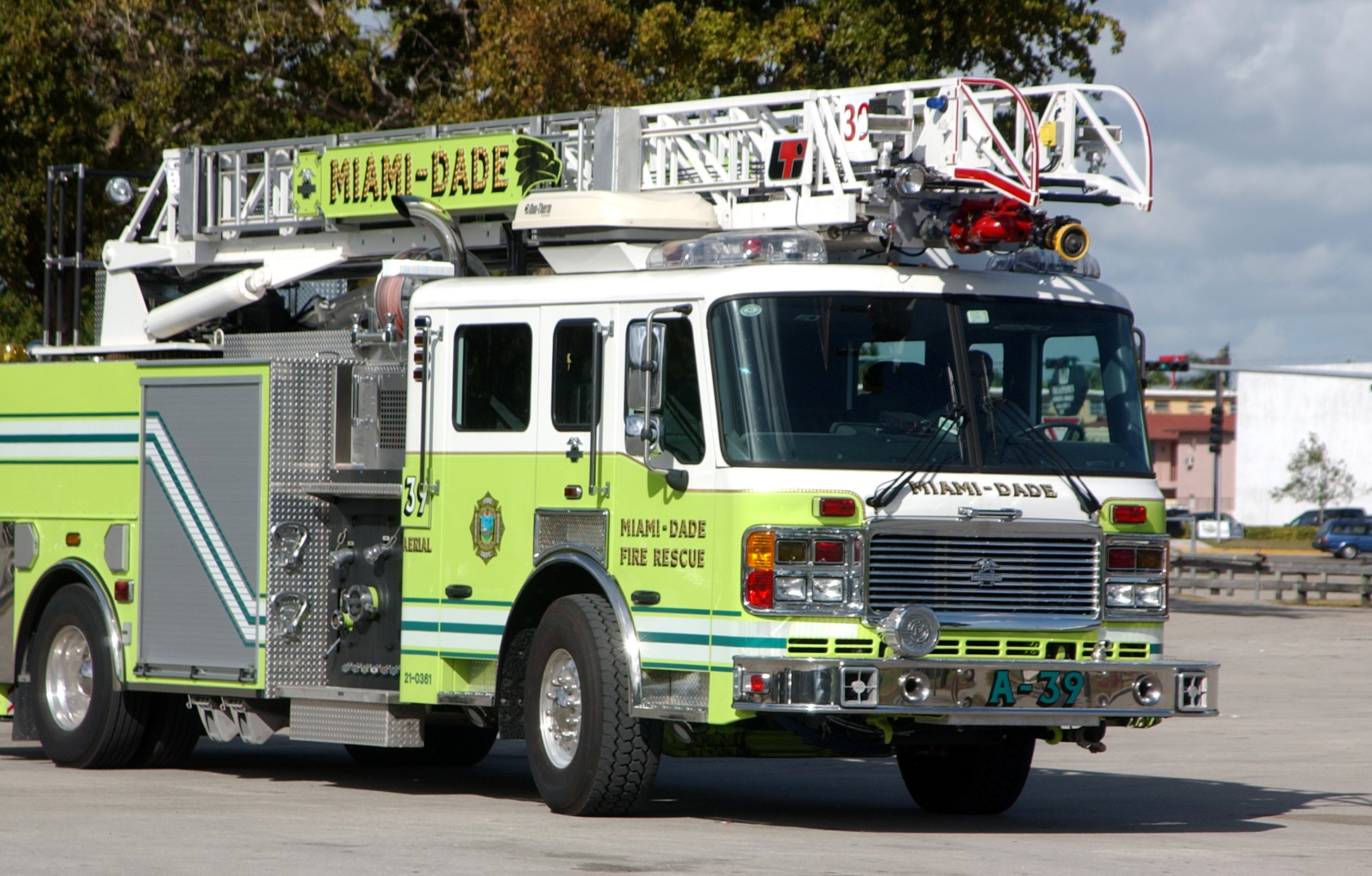
MDFR Aerial 39

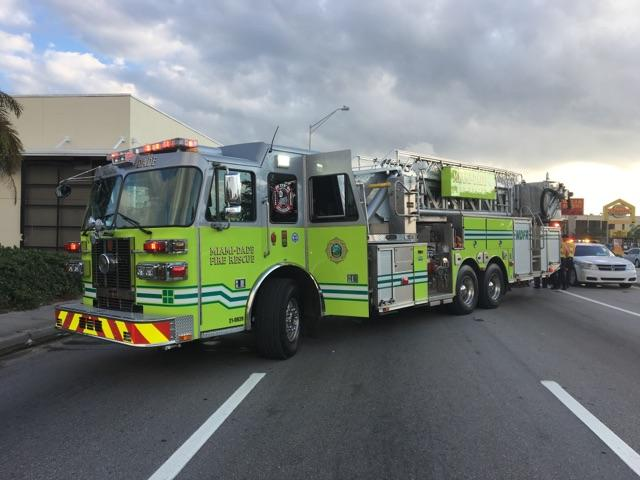
Platform fire truck

The MDFR has 72 stations split up in 14 battalions. As of 2015, there are three additional stations under construction and one planned in a location to be determined.

Fire Station #	City	Engine Company	Ladder Company	EMS Rescue Unit	Other units
1	Miami Lakes	Engine 1		Rescue 1	EMS 1
2	Miami	Engine 2		Rescue 2 Rescue 202	Battalion 5 BLS unit 2
3	Miami	Engine 3		Rescue 3	*Red units for 9/11 tribute*
4	Coral Reef		Ladder 4	Rescue 4	Battalion 9 BLS unit 2
5	Princeton	Engine 5		Rescue 5	
6	Modello	Engine 6		Rescue 6 Rescue 71	EMS 6
7	West Little River	Engine 7		Rescue 7 Rescue 67	EMS 7
8	Aventura	Engine 8		Rescue 8	Battalion 2
9	Kendall	Engine 9		Rescue 9	
10	Sunny Isles Beach	Engine 10		Rescue 10	
11	Miami Gardens	Engine 11		Rescue 11 Rescue 211	Battalion 4
12	Miami International Airport	Engine 12		Rescue 12	Battalion 6 ARFF Foam 1, 2, & 3 Terminal EMS Carts
13	Miami		Ladder 13	Rescue 13	Air Truck 13 South Maintenance Yard EMS 13 Coms/Ops support vehicles
14	South Miami	Engine 14		Rescue 14	Battalion 8
15	Key Biscayne			Rescue 15	RHIB 15
16	Homestead	Engine 16		Rescue 16 Rescue 72	Battalion 10 Water Tender 1
17	Virginia Gardens	HazMat Engine 17		Rescue 17	HazMat Support 17
18	North Miami-Central		Ladder 18	Rescue 18	
19	North Miami-West	TRT Engine 19		Rescue 19	
20	North Miami-East	Engine 20		Rescue 20	Battalion 3
21	Miami		Platform 21	Rescue 21	Battalion 1 Fire Boat 21
22	North Miami		Ladder 22	Rescue 22	
23	Pinecrest	Engine 23		Rescue 23	Venom 1 Unit
24	Miami Executive Airport				Foam 24 Air Rescue South
25	Miami-Opa Locka Executive Airport				Foam 25 Air Rescue North
26	Opa-Locka		Platform 26	Rescue 26	
27	North Bay Village	Engine 27		Rescue 27	
28	Hialeah Gardens			HazMat Rescue 28	
29	Sweetwater		Ladder 29	Rescue 29	Battalion 12
30	Miami Shores	Engine 30		Rescue 30	
31	North Miami Beach		Ladder 31	Rescue 31	
32	North Miami Beach	Engine 32		Rescue 32	
33	Aventura			Rescue 33	EMS 33
34	Cutler Ridge		Platform 34	Rescue 34	South Operations Division Chief Rehab Canteen
35	Miami Springs	Engine 35		Rescue 35	
36	Hammocks		Ladder 36	Rescue 36	
37	Miami	Engine 37		Rescue 37	
38	Miami Gardens		Ladder 38	Rescue 38	
39	Port of Miami		Ladder 39	Rescue 39	1 RHIBs
40	West Miami	Engine 40		Rescue 40	
41	Miami	Engine 41		Rescue 41	
42	Fisher Island		Platform 42	Rescue 42	
43	Richmond Heights	TRT Engine 43		Rescue 43	EMS 43
44	Palm Springs North	Engine 44		Rescue 44	
45	Doral	Engine 45		Rescue 45	
46	Medley	TRT Engine 46		Rescue 46	Collapse Truck
47	Westchester	Engine 47		Rescue 47	
48	Fontainebleau	Engine 48		Rescue 48	EMS 48
49	Pinecrest			Rescue 49	
50	Perrine	Engine 50		Rescue 50	
51	Miami Gardens		Ladder 51	Rescue 51	
52	South Miami Heights	Tanker 52		Rescue 52	
53	Miami		Ladder 53	Rescue 53	
54	Opa Locka / Bunche Park	Engine 54		Rescue 54	EMS 54
55	Saga Bay	Engine 55		Rescue 74	RHIB 55
56	West Kendall	HazMat Engine 56		Rescue 56	
57	West Kendall	Engine 57		Rescue 57	Battalion 13
58	Tamiami	Engine 58		Rescue 58	BLS Unit 58
59	Miami International Airport		HazMat Platform 59		ARFF Foam 4 Quick Response Vehicle (QRV) 59 Airport Operations Division Chief
60	Redland	Tanker 60		Rescue 60	Airboat 1
61	Miami	Engine 61		Rescue 61	Airboat
62	Palmetto Bay	Engine 62			
63	Miami	HazMat Engine 63		Rescue 63	
64	Miami Lakes		Ladder 64	Rescue 64	Battalion 14
65	Homestead	Engine 65		Rescue 65	
66	Homestead	Engine 72	Ladder 66	Rescue 77	
68	Sweetwater	Engine 68			TRT Squad 1 Heavy Rotator 1
69	Doral	Engine 69		Rescue 69	HazMat 1 HazMat Battalion 11
70	Coconut Palm	Hazmat Engine 70 and TRT Engine 77		Rescue 70	Battalion 7 BLS unit 70
71	Richmond West	Tanker 71			
73	Port of Miami				FireBoat 73
76	Bal Harbor	Engine 76		Rescue 76	
78	Eastern Shores			Rescue 78	
83	Medley East	under construction	Ladder 83	Operating out of North shop	
87	Doral	NW 41 ST and 9300 BLK		under construction	
