= Florida State Road 994 =

State highway in Florida, United States

State Road 994
- Quail Roost Drive
- SR 994 highlighted in red

Route information
- Maintained by FDOT
- Length: 8.058 mi (12.968 km)
- Existed: 1983 (as SR 994)–present

Major junctions
- West end: SR 997 in Redland
- Florida's Turnpike Extension in South Miami Heights
- East end: US 1 in Cutler Bay

Location
- Country: United States
- State: Florida
- Counties: Miami-Dade

Highway system
- Florida State Highway System; Interstate; US; State; Former; Pre‑1945; Toll; Scenic
← SR 992	→ SR 996

State Road 994 (SR 994), locally known as Quail Roost Drive, is an 8.06-mile-long (12.97 km) east–west four-lane road in southern Miami-Dade County, Florida area. It connects Krome Avenue (SR 997) with U.S. Route 1.

== Route description ==
State Road 994's western terminus lies in Redland, about 2 miles (3.2 km) northwest of the former Aladdin City and 7.5 miles (12.1 km) north of Homestead at a signalised intersection with Krome Avenue (SR 997), at the south-eastern corner of a housing estate. It heads east as Quail Roost Drive, or Southwest 200th Street, an undivided two-lane road through farmland, crossing CSX tracks after 1.9 miles (3.1 km). After continuing east for another 2.1 miles (3.4 km), SR 994 reaches Southwest 137th Avenue and enters suburbia. Upon crossing the Black Creek Canal 1,100 yards (1,000 m) later, Quail Roost Drive enters the community of South Miami Heights, and soon reaches Southwest 127th Avenue where it expands to four lanes. After the intersection, SR 994 turns to the northeast and continues on this trajectory for the next 1.6 miles (2.6 km), losing the Southwest 200th Street designation, and passing through a residential neighbourhood and shopping district. As it turns back to the east, SR 994 has an interchange with the Homestead Extension of Florida's Turnpike, passing beneath it, before picking up the Southwest 186th Street designation as it leaves South Miami Heights while crossing another canal. Afterwards, Quail Roost Drive passes through a mixture of commercial and light industrial uses, before crossing the South Miami-Dade Busway, forming the boundary between Cutler Bay and West Perrine's south-eastern corner. One block later, SR 994 terminates at US 1, the South Dixie Highway.

From SR 994's western terminus, Southwest 200th Street continues on through farmland in two segments, one from SR 994's terminus to Southwest 187th Street as a two-laned road, and again from just east of Southwest 194th Avenue to Southwest 207th Avenue, just east of the Aerojet canal, as an unmarked rural street and in some places little more than a gravel road. East of the SR 994 terminus, Southwest 186th Street continues on for several blocks into Cutler Bay to terminate at Southwest 97th Street.

== History ==
From 1980 to 1983 (when the Florida Department of Transportation reallocated route numbers in a statewide reorganization), Quail Roost Drive was designated State Road 974.

== Major intersections ==
The entire route is in Miami-Dade County.

Location	mi	km	Destinations	Notes
Redland	0.000	0.000	SR 997 (Krome Avenue)	Southwest 177th Avenue
	4.1	6.6	Southwest 137th Avenue	
South Miami Heights	6.99	11.25	Florida's Turnpike Extension – Orlando, Homestead	Exit 13 on Turnpike Extension
Cutler Bay	8.058	12.968	US 1 (Dixie Highway)	
1.000 mi = 1.609 km; 1.000 km = 0.621 mi: Electronic toll collection
