= Cutler, Florida =

- neighborhood
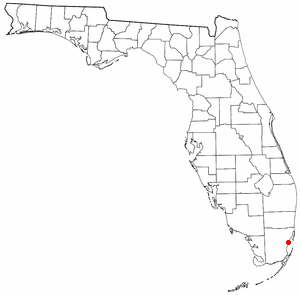
- Location of Cutler, Florida
- Coordinates: 25°37′38″N 80°19′15″W
- Country: United States
- State: Florida
- County: Miami-Dade

Area
  - Total: 6.8 sq mi (17.5 km^{2})
  - Land: 6.7 sq mi (17.4 km^{2})
  - Water: 0.039 sq mi (0.1 km^{2})
- Elevation: 9.8 ft (3 m)

Population (2000)
  - Total: 17,390
  - Density: 2,585/sq mi (998.1/km^{2})
- Time zone: UTC-5 (Eastern (EST))
  - Summer (DST): UTC-4 (EDT)
- FIPS code: 12-15962
- GNIS feature ID: 0281183

Cutler was a pioneer town in Miami-Dade County, Florida that existed from 1883 to 1915, when most of it was absorbed into the Charles Deering Estate. The area adjoining the western border of the estate later became the Cutler census-designated place (CDP) through the time of the 2000 census, after which it was incorporated into the Village of Palmetto Bay. The population was 17,390 at the 2000 census.

== History ==
Originally called the Hunting Ground due to its long use for that purpose by Native American tribes, the area was part of the 36-square-mile survey township granted to Henry Perrine by the United States Congress in 1838. In 1864, John and Mary Addison arrived at the Hunting Ground from Manatee County and built a home. By the 1870s, the area was being called Addison's Landing. In the early 1880s, Dr. William C. Cutler visited the area and subsequently purchased 600 acres. In 1882, Cutler persuaded his friend, William Fuzzard, to settle in the area, and in 1883, Fuzzard built a wooden two-story home. In 1884, Fuzzard, along with several other settlers, cut a path from his homestead to Coconut Grove, which eventually became Old Cutler Road. By the end of the year, the population had reached 75, and a post-office with the name "Cutler" was established near a wharf built at the northeastern part of the settlement.

The Brown & Moody General Store in Cutler, circa 1900

In 1896, residents built the Cutler Schoolhouse. That same year, Samuel H. Richmond built a large, two-story balloon frame home known as the Richmond Cottage, which in 1899 was transformed into the area's only inn. A factory, stores, and other buildings were located around the intersection of what is now S.W. 168th Street (Richmond Drive) and S.W. 72nd Avenue (then the location of Old Cutler Road). The post office was moved to the Brown & Moody General Store. However, after the Florida East Coast Railway bypassed Cutler in 1903 for the new railroad town of Perrine 2 1/2 miles west, the town fell into a decline as farmers and settlers left to be closer to the railroad. From 1914 to 1917, Charles Deering purchased most of the land in the area, subsuming it within his estate. Except for the Richmond Cottage, which Deering incorporated into his estate, all of the buildings in the town were torn down.

Suburban development slowly began to approach the boundaries of the Deering Estate in the 1960s. By the end of the 1970s, the area west of the Estate was almost fully developed and became the Cutler CDP. In 1986, after Charles Deering's last surviving daughter died, the Estate was purchased by the State of Florida.

The Village of Palmetto Bay was incorporated on September 10, 2002, and took the territory formerly held by the Cutler CDP, as well as the eastern half of Perrine that had become the East Perrine CDP.

== Geography ==
Cutler is located at 25°37′38″N 80°19′15″W (25.627187, -80.320704).

According to the United States Census Bureau, the CDP has a total area of 17.5 km^{2} (6.8 sq mi). 17.4 km^{2} (6.7 sq mi) of it is land and 0.1 km^{2} (0.039 sq mi) of it (0.30%) is water.

== Demographics ==
Historical population
Census	Pop.	Note	%±
1980	15,593		—
1990	16,201		3.9%
2000	17,390		7.3%

As of the census of 2000, there were 17,390 people, 5,694 households, and 4,931 families residing in the CDP. The population density was 997.7 people/km^{2} (2,584 people/mi^{2}). There were 5,806 housing units at an average density of 333.1 units/km^{2} (863 units/mi^{2}). The racial makeup of the CDP was 89.21% White (65.6% were Non-Hispanic White,) 3.90% African American, 0.11% Native American, 3.00% Asian, 0.03% Pacific Islander, 1.91% from other races, and 1.85% from two or more races. Hispanic or Latino residents of any race were 26.19% of the population.

There were 5,694 households, out of which 46.6% had children under the age of 18 living with them, 75.6% were married couples living together, 8.9% had a female householder with no husband present, and 13.4% were non-families. 10.8% of all households were made up of individuals, and 3.4% had someone living alone who was 65 years of age or older. The average household size was 3.05 and the average family size was 3.27.

In the CDP, 29.5% of the population was under the age of 18, 5.9% was from 18 to 24, 27.2% from 25 to 44, 27.9% from 45 to 64, and 9.4% was 65 years of age or older. The median age was 39 years. For every 100 females, there were 95.0 males. For every 100 females age 18 and over, there were 91.1 males.

The median income for a household in the CDP was $106,432, and the median income for a family was $112,398. Males had a median income of $75,821 versus $40,640 for females. The per capita income for the CDP was $42,986. About 4.0% of families and 5.2% of the population were below the poverty line, including 5.8% of those under age 18 and 3.8% of those age 65 or over.

As of 2000, before being annexed to Palmetto Bay, English was the sole home language of 65.56% of all residents. Spanish was spoken at home by 28.78%, Portuguese by 1.53%, Italian 0.66%, French 0.62%, and both Chinese and Tagalog by 0.47% of the population.

== Economy ==
At one point the Burger King headquarters were located in Cutler, in a campus described by Elaine Walker of the Miami Herald as "sprawling" and "virtually hidden away." Burger King moved to its current headquarters in unincorporated Miami-Dade County in July and August 2002. The former Burger King headquarters as of 2007 houses rental offices for several companies.

== Education ==
Miami-Dade County Public Schools served Cutler. Coral Reef Elementary School and Southwood Middle School had been located in Cutler before Palmetto Bay incorporated.

Westminster Christian School and Palmer Trinity School had been located in Cutler before Palmetto Bay incorporated.
