= Peters, Florida =

- Former Community
- Location within the state of Florida Peters, Florida (the United States)
- Coordinates: 25°36′N 80°21′W
- Country: United States
- State: Florida
- County: Miami-Dade
- Time zone: UTC-5 (Eastern (EST))
  - Summer (DST): UTC-4 (EDT)

Peters, Florida, was a community in southern Dade County during the first half of the 20th century. It was located at the intersection of Quail Roost Road and the Florida East Coast Railway, and later became part of Perrine.

== See also ==
- List of ghost towns in Florida
