= Southwood Middle School =

Secondary school in Palmetto Bay, Florida

Coordinates: 25.619455°N 80.322074°W

Southwood Middle School Center for the Arts

Location
- 16301 SW 80th Ave; Palmetto Bay, Florida 33157; United States

Information
- Type: Public middle
- Established: 1975
- School district: Miami-Dade County Public Schools
- Principal: Daniel Barreras
- Teaching staff: 66.00 (FTE)
- Grades: 6-8
- Enrollment: 1,425 (2017–18)
- Student to teacher ratio: 21.59
- Campus: Suburban
- Colors: Blue and Gold
- Mascot: SuperStar
- School hours: 9:10 am - 3:50 pm
- Website: southwoodmiddleschool.org

Southwood Middle School Center for the Arts, more commonly known as Southwood Middle School, is a public secondary school located on 16301 Southwest 80th Avenue in Palmetto Bay, Florida. Its principal is Daniel Barreras.

The mascot for the school is the SuperStar, a cartoonish star who wears a top hat and carries a cane.

== History ==
The school was formerly located in the census-designated place of Cutler until the incorporation of Palmetto Bay on September 10, 2002.

Southwood received national attention when, on February 3, 2004, 14-year-old Jaime Rodrigo Gough, an eighth-grader was stabbed to death on campus by 14-year-old Michael Hernandez. Hernandez was tried as an adult, and sentenced to life in prison without parole and his sentence was upheld in a 2018 resentencing hearing. In April 2021, Hernandez collapsed at the Columbia Correctional Institution and died of cardiac dysrhythmia attributed to morbid obesity at the age of 31. Southwood now celebrates "Peace Week" during the first week of February as a memorial for the murder.

== Academics ==
During the 1984-85 school year, Southwood Jr. High School was recognized with the Blue Ribbon School Award of Excellence by the United States Department of Education, the highest award an American school can receive.

Southwood contains five magnet programs, for which students must audition and be accepted in order to take: Music (which contains the orchestra, band, and chorus strands), Photography, Theatre, Art, and Dance. Southwood takes in non-magnet students as well, who live within the designated area, but those students take regular electives instead of magnet classes. Magnet students do not have to live within this district in order to attend.

== Notable alumni ==
- Julie Davis, independent film director, writer and actress.
- Alex Lacamoire, Tony Award-winning music director and conductor; music director of Wicked, In the Heights, and Hamilton.
- Christy Turlington, model best known for representing Calvin Klein from 1987 to 2007
- Nadia Turner, finalist on the 4th season of American Idol
