= CBT Technology Institute =

College in Miami, United States

Coordinates: 25°46′07″N 80°20′23″W

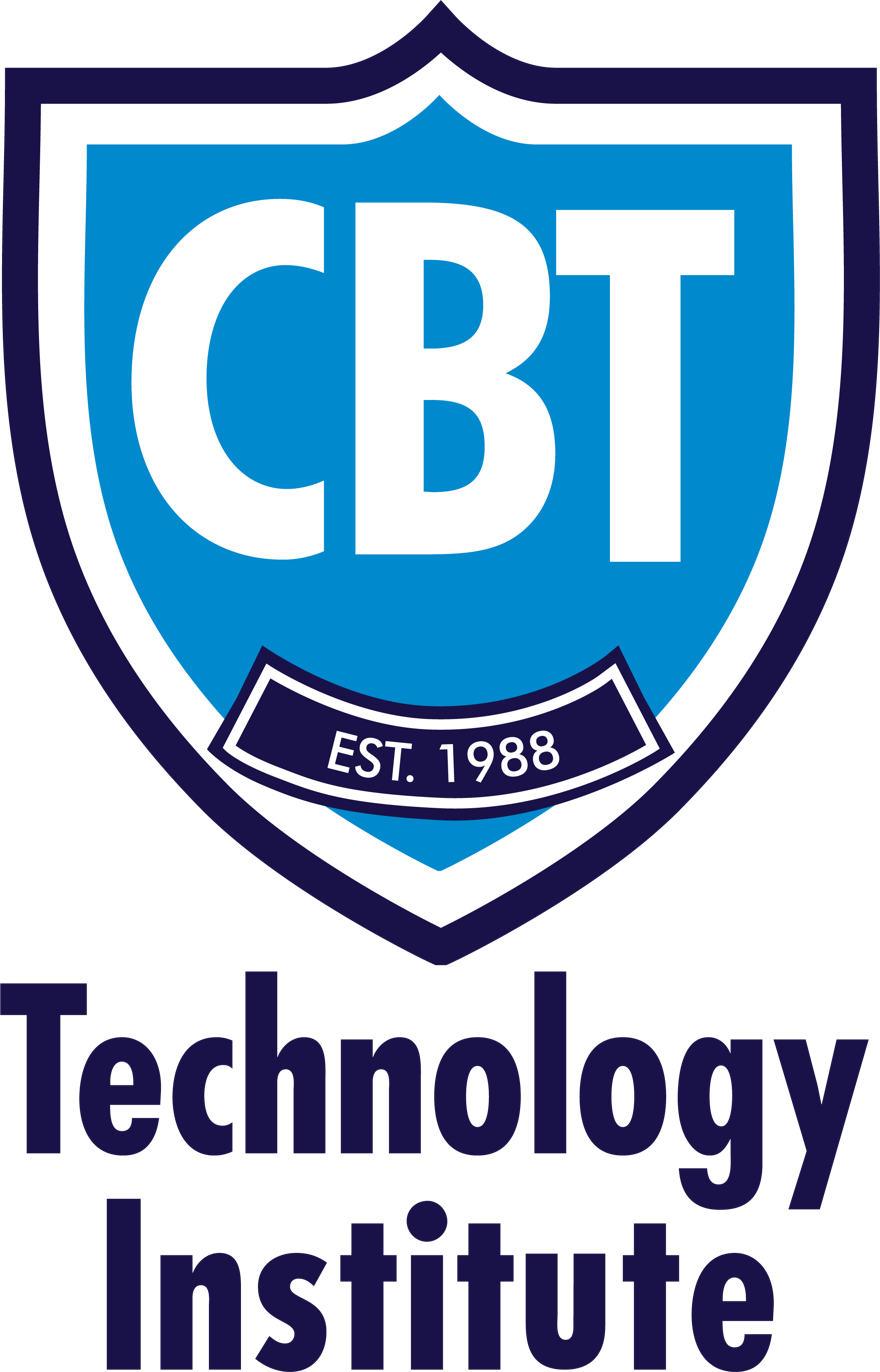
- Former names: College of Business & Technology
- Motto: Begin. Belong. BeMore
- Type: Private for-profit college
- Established: 1988
- Accreditation: COE
- Director: Luis Llerena
- Location: Miami, Florida, United States
- Colors: Navy Blue, Black, & White
- Website: www.cbt.edu

The CBT Technology Institute (formerly the College of Business & Technology and also known as CBT) is a private for-profit college based in Miami, Florida. CBT operates three campus locations throughout Miami Dade County and one corporate office in Cutler Bay, Florida. It is accredited by the Council on Occupational Education.

== History ==
The College of Business and Technology was founded in 1988 by Fernando Llerena and Gladys Llerena, as the Business and Technology Institute. The institution in February 2001 changed its name to the College of Business and Technology. In 2002 CBT Technology Institute began offering associate degree programs and changed accreditation to the Accrediting Council for Independent Colleges and Schools (ACICS) to pursue higher education degrees. Three years later, the institution expanded by opening new two locations, one in Miami (Flagler) and the other in Hialeah. The Cutler Bay location was added in 2008 followed in 2010. In October 2011, CBT was accredited to offer a Bachelor's program. The Miami Gardens location was added in 2013. In 2022, the institution received accreditation from the Council on Occupational Education following the demise of ACICS as a recognized accreditor.

== Academics ==
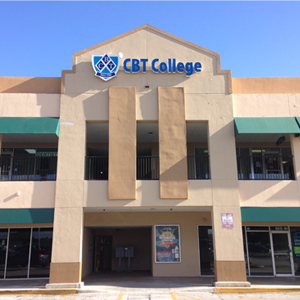
CBT Technology Institute's Cutler Bay Campus

CBT Technology Institute offers academic, technical, and vocational programs. Some of these courses give the individual the ability to apply for professional certifications applicable for the area of training.
