= Florida State Road 996 =

Highway in Florida

State Road 996

Route information
- Maintained by FDOT
- Length: 0.301 mi (484 m)
- Existed: 2025–present

Major junctions
- West end: SR 969 in Miami-Dade County
- East end: Northwest 12th Street in Miami-Dade County

Location
- Country: United States
- State: Florida
- Counties: Miami-Dade

Highway system
- Florida State Highway System; Interstate; US; State; Former; Pre‑1945; Toll; Scenic
← SR 994	→ SR 997

State Road 996 (SR 996), known locally as Northwest 11th Street and Northwest 72nd Avenue, is a road in unincorporated Miami-Dade County just north of the Dolphin Expressway and just south of Miami International Airport. Running 0.3 miles (0.48 km). the road partially follows a former alignment of SR 969 on Northwest 72nd Avenue.

== Route description ==
SR 996 starts at the intersection of Milam Dairy Road (SR 969) and the onramp to the Dolphin Expressway (SR 836) and Palmetto Expressway (SR 826). It travels east to an intersection with an exit ramp from the Dolphin Expressway, where it turns north. The state road terminates at Northwest 12th Street, which was a former alignment for SR 969 heading north via left turn.

== Major intersections ==
The entire route is in Miami-Dade County.

Location	mi	km	Destinations	Notes
	0.000	0.000	SR 836 west (Dolphin Expressway) / SR 826 (Palmetto Expressway)	Western terminus
	0.000	0.000	SR 969 (Milam Dairy Road)	Western terminus
	0.22	0.35	SR 836 (Dolphin Expressway)	westbound off-ramp
	0.30	0.48	Northwest 12th Street	Eastern terminus; former SR 969 north
1.000 mi = 1.609 km; 1.000 km = 0.621 mi
