= West Perrine, Florida =

- Census-designated place
- Location in Miami-Dade County and the state of Florida

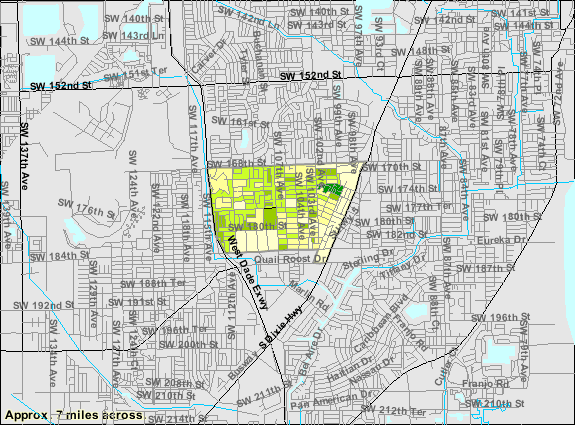
- U.S. Census Bureau map showing CDP boundaries
- Coordinates: 25°36′22″N 80°22′20″W
- Country: United States
- State: Florida
- County: Miami-Dade

Area
  - Total: 1.75 sq mi (4.54 km^{2})
  - Land: 1.75 sq mi (4.54 km^{2})
  - Water: 0 sq mi (0.00 km^{2})
- Elevation: 7 ft (2.1 m)

Population (2020)
  - Total: 10,602
  - Density: 6,046.4/sq mi (2,334.53/km^{2})
- Time zone: UTC-5 (Eastern (EST))
  - Summer (DST): UTC-4 (EDT)
- ZIP Code: 33157 (Miami)
- Area codes: 305, 786, 645
- FIPS code: 12-76700
- GNIS feature ID: 2403009

West Perrine is a census-designated place (CDP) in Miami-Dade County, Florida, United States. It is part of the Miami metropolitan area of South Florida. The population was 10,602 at the 2020 census, up from 9,460 in 2010.

== History ==
Prior to the 2000 census it was part of Perrine. The other part of Perrine became the East Perrine CDP for the 2000 census and is now part of the incorporated Village of Palmetto Bay. West Perrine is still an unincorporated area, although some residents have discussed the possibility of incorporating Perrine. The name derives from a land grant issued to the heirs of Henry Perrine, an agriculturist (among other things).

== Geography ==
West Perrine is located 16 miles (26 km) southwest of downtown Miami. It is bordered to the north by Palmetto Estates, to the east by Palmetto Bay, to the southeast by Cutler Bay, to the south by South Miami Heights, and to the west by Zoo Miami.

According to the United States Census Bureau, the CDP has a total area of 1.8 square miles (4.7 km^{2}), all of it land.

U.S. Route 1 (Dixie Highway) forms the eastern border of the community. It leads northeast into Miami and southwest 12 miles (19 km) to Homestead.

== Demographics ==
Historical population
Census	Pop.	Note	%±
2000	8,600		—
2010	9,460		10.0%
2020	10,602		12.1%
U.S. Decennial Census

=== Racial and ethnic composition ===
West Perrine CDP, Florida – Racial and ethnic composition Note: the US Census treats Hispanic/Latino as an ethnic category. This table excludes Latinos from the racial categories and assigns them to a separate category. Hispanics/Latinos may be of any race.
Race / Ethnicity (NH = Non-Hispanic)	Pop 2000	Pop 2010	Pop 2020	% 2000	% 2010	% 2020
White alone (NH)	742	490	427	8.63%	5.18%	4.03%
Black or African American alone (NH)	6,180	5,702	4,806	71.86%	60.27%	45.33%
Native American or Alaska Native alone (NH)	17	21	8	0.20%	0.22%	0.08%
Asian alone (NH)	100	96	87	1.16%	1.01%	0.82%
Native Hawaiian or Pacific Islander alone (NH)	6	0	2	0.07%	0.00%	0.02%
Other race alone (NH)	40	31	53	0.47%	0.33%	0.50%
Mixed race or Multiracial (NH)	114	122	154	1.33%	1.29%	1.45%
Hispanic or Latino (any race)	1,401	2,998	5,065	16.29%	31.69%	47.77%
Total	8,600	9,460	10,602	100.00%	100.00%	100.00%

=== 2020 census ===
As of the 2020 census, West Perrine had a population of 10,602. The median age was 37.2 years. 23.8% of residents were under the age of 18 and 14.9% of residents were 65 years of age or older. For every 100 females there were 89.1 males, and for every 100 females age 18 and over there were 85.0 males age 18 and over.

100.0% of residents lived in urban areas, while 0.0% lived in rural areas.

There were 3,358 households in West Perrine, of which 38.9% had children under the age of 18 living in them. Of all households, 33.7% were married-couple households, 18.3% were households with a male householder and no spouse or partner present, and 38.7% were households with a female householder and no spouse or partner present. About 20.5% of all households were made up of individuals and 9.4% had someone living alone who was 65 years of age or older.

There were 3,516 housing units, of which 4.5% were vacant. The homeowner vacancy rate was 0.5% and the rental vacancy rate was 4.5%.

=== Demographic estimates ===
The 2020 American Community Survey 5-year profile reported 2,131 families residing in the CDP.

=== 2010 census ===
As of the 2010 United States census, there were 9,460 people, 2,843 households, and 2,014 families residing in the CDP.

=== 2000 census ===
As of the census of 2000, there were 8,600 people, 2,642 households, and 2,021 families residing in the CDP. The population density was 4,966.9 inhabitants per square mile (1,917.7/km^{2}). There were 2,814 housing units at an average density of 1,625.2 per square mile (627.5/km^{2}). The racial makeup of the CDP was 18.92% White (8.6% were Non-Hispanic White), 73.41% African American, 0.28% Native American, 1.20% Asian, 0.07% Pacific Islander, 3.16% from other races, and 2.97% from two or more races. Hispanic or Latino of any race were 16.29% of the population.

As of 2000, there were 2,642 households, out of which 39.6% had children under the age of 18 living with them, 36.6% were married couples living together, 31.9% had a female householder with no husband present, and 23.5% were non-families. 19.4% of all households were made up of individuals, and 8.7% had someone living alone who was 65 years of age or older. The average household size was 3.25 and the average family size was 3.71.

In 2000, in the CDP, the population was spread out, with 33.9% under the age of 18, 9.6% from 18 to 24, 27.4% from 25 to 44, 18.9% from 45 to 64, and 10.2% who were 65 years of age or older. The median age was 30 years. For every 100 females, there were 87.9 males. For every 100 females age 18 and over, there were 81.8 males.

In 2000, the median income for a household in the CDP was $28,420, and the median income for a family was $29,987. Males had a median income of $27,383 versus $22,944 for females. The per capita income for the CDP was $12,190. About 30.8% of families and 34.4% of the population were below the poverty line, including 52.1% of those under age 18 and 25.0% of those age 65 or over.

As of 2000, speakers of English as a first language accounted for 79.75% of residents, while Spanish made up 17.78%, and French Creole was the mother tongue of 2.46% of the population.
