= Perrine, Florida =

Community in Florida, USA

Coordinates: 25°36′18″N 80°21′13″W

Perrine, Florida was an unincorporated community in Miami-Dade County, Florida, United States, about midway between Miami and Homestead. The community was named after Henry Perrine, who in 1839 had been granted a survey township of land in the area by the United States Congress in recognition of his service as United States Consul in Campeche, Mexico, and to support his plans to introduce new plants from tropical countries into cultivation in the United States.

While waiting to hear if Congress had approved his grant, Perrine took up residence with his family at Indian Key, Florida, in 1838. This location was considered safer than the southern Florida mainland, as the Second Seminole War was still in progress. On August 7, 1840, Indians attacked Indian Key. Several people were killed, including Perrine, but his family escaped.

== History ==
Perrine's son, Henry Jr., and one of Perrine's business partners, Charles Howe, made various attempts to exploit the grant, with little success. Eventually homesteaders began to encroach on the grant, and in 1886 families that had started farms in the grant area formed a squatters union to fight eviction from their farms by the Perrine heirs. Two railroad companies, including the Florida East Coast Railway, joined with the Perrine heirs, and the courts eventually awarded 2,000 acres (8.1 km^{2}) to the squatters, 10,000 acres (40 km^{2}) to the Perrine family, and 5,000 acres (20 km^{2}) each to the railroad companies (part of the original grant had been sold earlier).

The community that became known as Perrine started as a railroad camp during the construction of the Florida East Coast Railway extension from Miami to Homestead. The first school in Perrine was opened in 1909. The community developed in a segregated fashion, with the area to the east of the railroad all white and the area to the west of the railroad all black. Perrine incorporated as a city in 1948. Ben Shavis, a black man, tried to run for mayor, but he was pressured to give up, among others by the Ku Klux Klan, and he resigned. He denied that it was because his life was threatened: "I talked it over with the Lord, and the Lord told me to withdraw." White grower Robert Barfield was elected instead. Two months later, Barfield, along with three other commissioners, offered their resignations. Barfield said "I want to get out of the city of Perrine and I want to get my property out." By May, the town had been abolished.

A black mayor was elected a year later. The all-white city council and the first mayor requested the Florida Legislature to dissolve the city, and it did.

Perrine was a Census-designated place (CDP) in the 1990 U.S. Census, with a counted population of 15,576. In the 2000 Census, Perrine was divided into two CDPs: East Perrine and West Perrine. East Perrine, which had a population of 7,079 in 2000, became part of the incorporated municipality of Palmetto Bay in 2002. West Perrine had a population of 8,600 in 2000, and 9,460 in 2010.

== Climate ==
Perrine has a tropical monsoon climate (Am), according to the Köppen climate classification.

Climate data for Perrine 4W, Florida, 1991–2020 normals, extremes 1989–present
Month	Jan	Feb	Mar	Apr	May	Jun	Jul	Aug	Sep	Oct	Nov	Dec	Year
Record high °F (°C)	87 (31)	90 (32)	92 (33)	97 (36)	96 (36)	98 (37)	98 (37)	97 (36)	97 (36)	95 (35)	90 (32)	89 (32)	98 (37)
Mean maximum °F (°C)	83.9 (28.8)	85.9 (29.9)	88.1 (31.2)	90.1 (32.3)	92.0 (33.3)	93.3 (34.1)	94.3 (34.6)	94.3 (34.6)	92.9 (33.8)	91.0 (32.8)	87.0 (30.6)	84.9 (29.4)	95.3 (35.2)
Mean daily maximum °F (°C)	76.1 (24.5)	78.1 (25.6)	80.2 (26.8)	83.8 (28.8)	86.3 (30.2)	88.9 (31.6)	90.0 (32.2)	90.4 (32.4)	89.0 (31.7)	85.9 (29.9)	81.4 (27.4)	78.0 (25.6)	84.0 (28.9)
Daily mean °F (°C)	65.5 (18.6)	67.4 (19.7)	69.7 (20.9)	73.4 (23.0)	77.0 (25.0)	80.4 (26.9)	81.3 (27.4)	81.8 (27.7)	80.7 (27.1)	77.5 (25.3)	72.2 (22.3)	68.1 (20.1)	74.6 (23.7)
Mean daily minimum °F (°C)	54.9 (12.7)	56.6 (13.7)	59.2 (15.1)	63.1 (17.3)	67.6 (19.8)	71.8 (22.1)	72.5 (22.5)	73.1 (22.8)	72.5 (22.5)	69.1 (20.6)	62.9 (17.2)	58.3 (14.6)	65.1 (18.4)
Mean minimum °F (°C)	39.1 (3.9)	42.3 (5.7)	45.5 (7.5)	51.5 (10.8)	59.3 (15.2)	67.8 (19.9)	69.9 (21.1)	70.2 (21.2)	69.1 (20.6)	58.9 (14.9)	49.9 (9.9)	43.0 (6.1)	36.6 (2.6)
Record low °F (°C)	30 (−1)	34 (1)	37 (3)	45 (7)	48 (9)	60 (16)	65 (18)	67 (19)	65 (18)	46 (8)	38 (3)	29 (−2)	29 (−2)
Average precipitation inches (mm)	2.04 (52)	2.26 (57)	2.29 (58)	3.39 (86)	5.63 (143)	10.11 (257)	7.76 (197)	10.16 (258)	10.09 (256)	7.60 (193)	2.88 (73)	2.26 (57)	66.47 (1,688)
Average precipitation days (≥ 0.01 in)	7.6	6.4	6.1	6.6	10.6	17.5	17.8	19.0	18.3	14.1	8.6	7.7	140.3
Source: NOAA

== Education ==
Miami-Dade County Public Schools operates area public schools.

The Roman Catholic Archdiocese of Miami operates area Catholic schools. Our Lady of the Holy Rosary-St. Richard School is in Cutler Bay, It was formerly known as Our Lady of the Holy Rosary, and previously it was in the Cutler Ridge CDP but had a Perrine postal address.
