= C-9 Basin =

Area in Florida, United States

Miami-Dade County

C-9 Basin is an area in North Miami-Dade County, west of the Turnpike, bordered by US 27 (Okeechobee Road) and the C-9 canal which divides Dade and Broward Counties.

The C-9 is zoned for agricultural use.

On December 17, 2009, a coordinated enforcement effort of Miami-Dade County, State, and Federal agencies called "the C-9 Basin Enforcement Taskforce" including representatives from fifteen government agencies found apparent violations in terms of cockfighting rings, building, zoning, animal cruelty, illegal slaughterhouses, illegal dumping, environmental violations, fire code violations, electrical power violations, and unsafe structure violations. On January 21, 2010, a similar raid was conducted.
