= Hawley Heights, Florida =

Neighborhood of Kendall, Florida, US

Hawley Heights is a neighborhood of Kendall, a CDP and unincorporated community in Miami-Dade County, Florida, United States. It is located west of Pinecrest, and just south of Green-Mar Acres, a neighboring neighborhood. Its ZIP code is 33176.

== Geography ==
Hawley Heights is located at 25.661°N 80.344°W, with an elevation 10 feet (3.0 m).
