= East Perrine, Florida =

- neighborhood
- Interactive map of East Perrine, Florida
- Coordinates: 25°36′27″N 80°20′27″W
- Country: United States
- State: Florida
- County: Miami-Dade

Area
  - Total: 2.0 sq mi (5.1 km^{2})
  - Land: 2.0 sq mi (5.1 km^{2})
  - Water: 0 sq mi (0.0 km^{2})
- Elevation: 13 ft (4 m)

Population (2000)
  - Total: 7,079
  - Density: 3,586/sq mi (1,384.6/km^{2})
- Time zone: UTC-5 (Eastern (EST))
  - Summer (DST): UTC-4 (EDT)
- FIPS code: 12-19387
- GNIS feature ID: 1853248

East Perrine was a census-designated place in Miami-Dade County, Florida at the time of the 2000 census. In the 1990 census it was part of Perrine census-designated place. It has since been incorporated into the Village of Palmetto Bay. The population was 7,079 at the 2000 census.

== History ==
The Village of Palmetto Bay incorporated on September 10, 2002, taking the territory formerly held by the East Perrine census-designated place. East Perrine's name was derived from the name of Henry Perrine an agriculturist (among other things) who had been granted land in the area.

== Geography ==
East Perrine is located at 25°36′27″N 80°20′27″W (25.607383, -80.340967).

According to the United States Census Bureau, the CDP has a total area of 5.1 km^{2} (2.0 sq mi), all land.

== Demographics ==
As of the census of 2000, there were 7,079 people, 2,276 households, and 1,852 families residing in the CDP. The population density was 1,387.4 people/km^{2} (3,593 people/mi^{2}). There were 2,339 housing units at an average density of 458.4 units/km^{2} (1,187 units/mi^{2}). The racial makeup of the CDP was 72.44% White (48.2% were Non-Hispanic White,) 16.87% African American, 0.16% Native American, 2.39% Asian, 0.04% Pacific Islander, 3.74% from other races, and 4.37% from two or more races. Hispanic or Latino of any race were 30.09% of the population.

There were 2,276 households, out of which 44.8% had children under the age of 18 living with them, 61.2% were married couples living together, 15.2% had a female householder with no husband present, and 18.6% were non-families. 14.3% of all households were made up of individuals, and 3.9% had someone living alone who was 65 years of age or older. The average household size was 3.03 and the average family size was 3.34.

In the CDP, the population was spread out, with 28.7% under the age of 18, 8.0% from 18 to 24, 30.8% from 25 to 44, 23.3% from 45 to 64, and 9.2% who were 65 years of age or older. The median age was 35 years. For every 100 females, there were 91.1 males. For every 100 females age 18 and over, there were 88.9 males.

The median income for a household in the CDP was $60,395, and the median income for a family was $66,852. Males had a median income of $42,398 versus $35,660 for females. The per capita income for the CDP was $23,165. About 6.9% of families and 7.8% of the population were below the poverty line, including 12.4% of those under age 18 and 0.9% of those age 65 or over.

As of 2000, before being annexed to Palmetto Bay, English as a first language accounted for 66.62% of all residents, and Spanish comprised 30.22%, French Creole was at 1.64%, and French made up 1.49% of the population.

== Education ==
East Perrine was served by Miami-Dade County Public Schools. Perrine Elementary School had been located in East Perrine.

Perrine Seventh-Day Adventist School was located in East Perrine.
