= Palmetto Bay, Florida =

- Village
- Village of Palmetto Bay
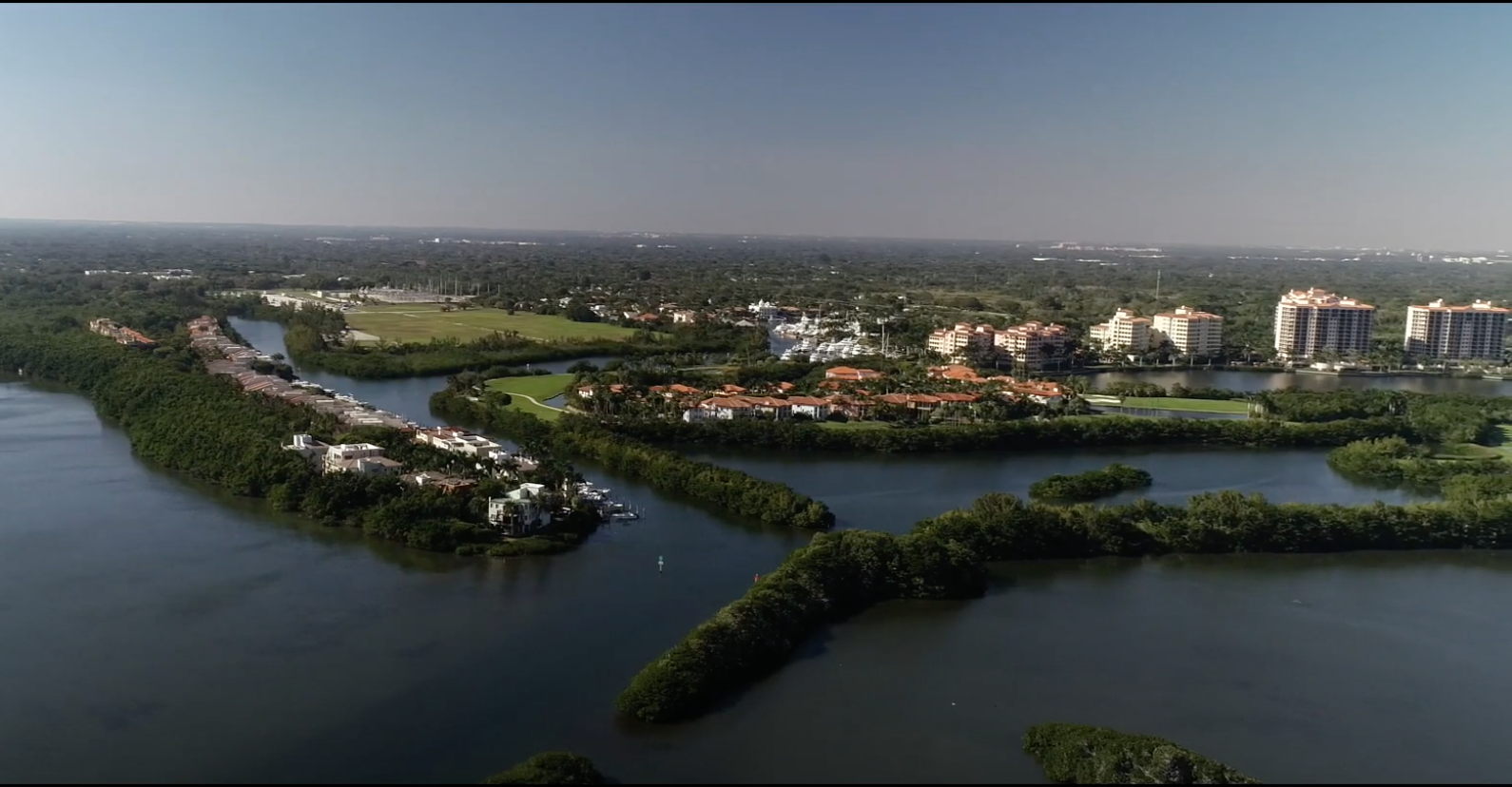

- Flag Seal
- Nickname: Village of Parks
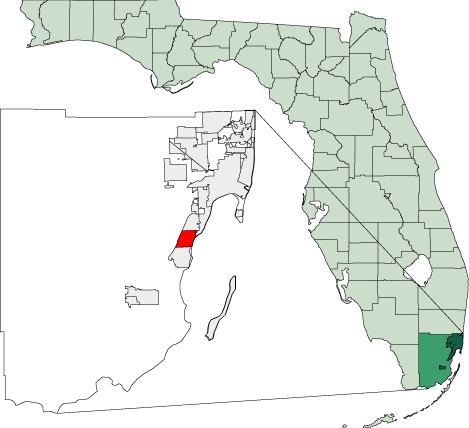
- Location in Miami-Dade and the state of Florida.

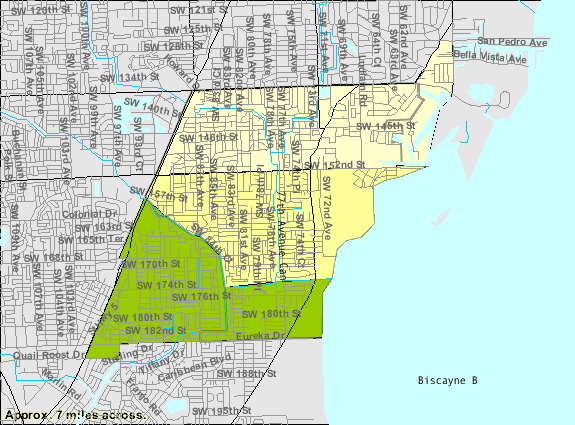
- U.S. Census Bureau map showing village boundaries
- Coordinates: 25°37′48″N 80°19′08″W
- Country: United States
- State: Florida
- County: Miami-Dade
- Incorporated: September 10, 2002

Government
  - Type: Mayor-Council

Area
  - Total: 8.44 sq mi (21.86 km^{2})
  - Land: 8.29 sq mi (21.46 km^{2})
  - Water: 0.16 sq mi (0.41 km^{2}) 0.44%
- Elevation: 10 ft (3.0 m)

Population (2020)
  - Total: 24,439
  - Density: 2,949.9/sq mi (1,138.96/km^{2})
- Time zone: UTC-5 (EST)
  - Summer (DST): UTC-4 (EDT)
- ZIP Codes: 33157, 33158, 33176
- Area codes: 305, 786, 645
- FIPS code: 12-54275
- GNIS feature ID: 2407519
- Website: www.palmettobay-fl.gov

Palmetto Bay is a suburban incorporated village in Miami-Dade County, Florida. Palmetto Bay includes two neighborhoods that were former census-designated places, Cutler and East Perrine. The village is part of the Miami metropolitan area of South Florida. The population was 24,439 as of the 2020 US census.

== History ==
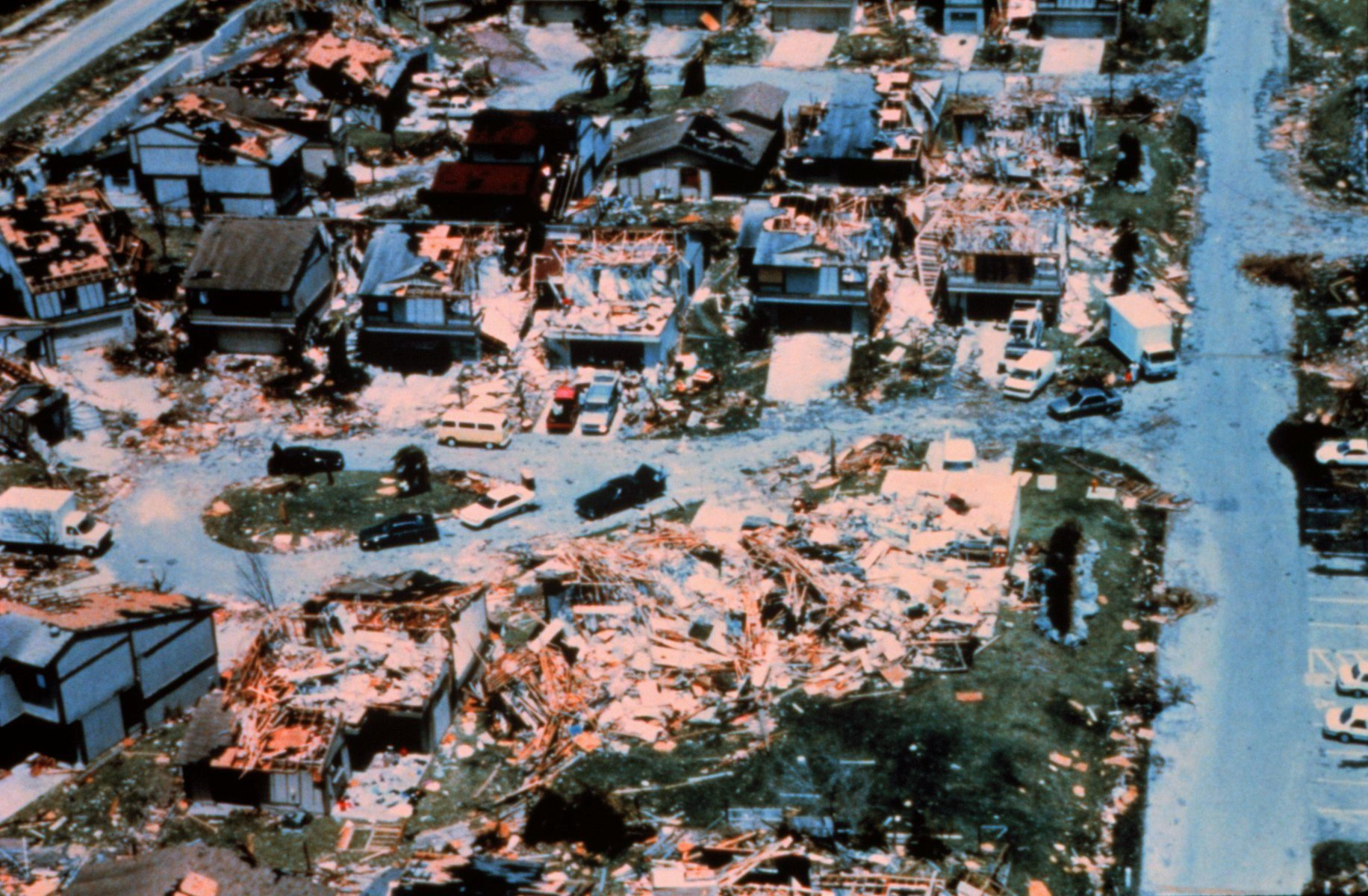
Damage from Hurricane Andrew in Lakes by the Bay

In August 1992, Palmetto Bay and the surrounding South Miami-Dade area were severely damaged by Hurricane Andrew. Many of the homes and businesses in Palmetto Bay were destroyed. In the subsequent years, the area was slowly rebuilt. Although many areas of Miami were heavily affected by Hurricane Andrew, Palmetto Bay was one of the worst affected and remains a reminder of the hurricane's extensive disaster in the city today.

Palmetto Bay was incorporated on September 10, 2002, taking the territory formerly held by the Cutler, Rockdale and East Perrine census-designated places. The founding council consisted of Mayor Eugene Flinn, Jr., Vice Mayor, Linda Robinson, and council members, John Breder, Edward Feller, and Paul Neidhart.

== Geography ==
Palmetto Bay is located just west of Biscayne Bay. It is 15 miles (24 km) southwest of downtown Miami. U.S. Route 1 (Dixie Highway) forms the western border of the village. Palmetto Bay is bordered to the northeast by Coral Gables, to the north by Pinecrest, to the northwest by Kendall, to the west by Palmetto Estates, to the southwest by West Perrine, and to the south by Cutler Bay.

According to the United States Census Bureau, the village of Palmetto Bay has a total area of 8.44 square miles (21.9 km^{2}): 8.28 square miles (21.4 km^{2}), or 98.1%, are land and 0.16 square miles (0.41 km^{2}), or 1.9%, are water.

== Demographics ==
Historical population
| Census | Pop. | Note | %± |
|---|---|---|---|
| 2000 | 24,469 | | — |
| 2010 | 23,410 | | −4.3% |
| 2020 | 24,439 | | 4.4% |
U.S. Decennial Census

=== 2020 census ===
As of the 2020 census, Palmetto Bay had a population of 24,439. The median age was 43.7 years. 22.7% of residents were under the age of 18 and 17.5% of residents were 65 years of age or older. For every 100 females there were 94.3 males, and for every 100 females age 18 and over there were 91.0 males age 18 and over.

99.7% of residents lived in urban areas, while 0.3% lived in rural areas.

There were 8,339 households in Palmetto Bay, of which 39.0% had children under the age of 18 living in them. Of all households, 64.9% were married-couple households, 10.7% were households with a male householder and no spouse or partner present, and 20.0% were households with a female householder and no spouse or partner present. About 15.1% of all households were made up of individuals and 7.8% had someone living alone who was 65 years of age or older.

There were 8,934 housing units, of which 6.7% were vacant. The homeowner vacancy rate was 1.5% and the rental vacancy rate was 16.1%.

Palmetto Bay racial composition (Hispanics excluded from racial categories) (NH = Non-Hispanic)
| Race | Number | Percentage |
|---|---|---|
| White (NH) | 9,287 | 38.00% |
| Black or African American (NH) | 1,131 | 4.63% |
| Native American or Alaska Native (NH) | 16 | 0.07% |
| Asian (NH) | 1,157 | 4.73% |
| Pacific Islander or Native Hawaiian (NH) | 2 | 0.01% |
| Some other race (NH) | 122 | 0.50% |
| Two or more races/Multiracial (NH) | 800 | 3.27% |
| Hispanic or Latino (any race) | 11,924 | 48.79% |
| Total | 24,439 | 100.00% |

=== 2010 census ===
Palmetto Bay Demographics
| 2010 Census | Palmetto Bay | Miami-Dade County | Florida |
|---|---|---|---|
| Total population | 23,410 | 2,496,435 | 18,801,310 |
| Population density | 2,823.9/sq mi | 1,315.5/sq mi | 350.6/sq mi |
| White or Caucasian (including White Hispanic) | 84.9% | 73.8% | 75.0% |
| (Non-Hispanic White or Caucasian) | 49.5% | 15.4% | 57.9% |
| Black or African-American | 6.2% | 18.9% | 16.0% |
| Hispanic or Latino (of any race) | 38.6% | 65.0% | 22.5% |
| Asian | 4.5% | 1.5% | 2.4% |
| Native American or Native Alaskan | 0.1% | 0.2% | 0.4% |
| Pacific Islander or Native Hawaiian | 0.0% | 0.0% | 0.1% |
| Two or more races (Multiracial) | 2.1% | 2.4% | 2.5% |
| Some Other Race | 2.2% | 3.2% | 3.6% |

As of the 2010 United States census, there were 23,410 people, 7,361 households, and 6,106 families residing in the village.

=== Demographic estimates ===
According to the 2020 American Community Survey five-year estimates, there were 6,177 families residing in the village.

=== Income and poverty ===
Between 2009 and 2013, the average median income for a household in the village was $105,122. Also, between 2009 and 2013, the per capita income for the village was $39,271.

== Economy ==
At one point the Burger King headquarters were located in what was the Cutler census-designated place, in a campus described by Elaine Walker of the Miami Herald as "sprawling" and "virtually hidden away." Burger King moved to its current headquarters in unincorporated Miami-Dade County in July and August 2002. The former Burger King headquarters as of 2007 houses rental offices for several companies.

== Education ==
Palmetto Bay is served by the Miami-Dade County Public Schools.

Howard Drive Elementary, Perrine Elementary, and Coral Reef Elementary School, in Palmetto Bay, serve separate sections of the city.

The city is zoned to:

- Southwood Middle School
- Palmetto Middle School (Pinecrest)
- Miami Palmetto Senior High School (Pinecrest)

Palmetto Bay private schools:

- Christ Fellowship Academy
- Alexander Montessori School
- Westminster Christian School
- Palmer Trinity School
- Perrine Seventh-Day Adventist School

Miami-Dade Public Library System and the Village opened the Palmetto Bay Branch Library in 2009.

== Media ==
Palmetto Bay is served by the Miami market for local radio and television. The Village has its own newspaper, The Palmetto Bay News, which is published bi-weekly and is part of Miami Community Newspapers. The Miami Herald covers the Village in its South Dade edition of its "Neighbors" supplement.

Prior to 2012, the Village streamed its council meetings exclusively online. In early 2012, the Village expanded its video services to a government access TV network, WBAY, which offers a variety of local programming in addition to coverage of council meetings.

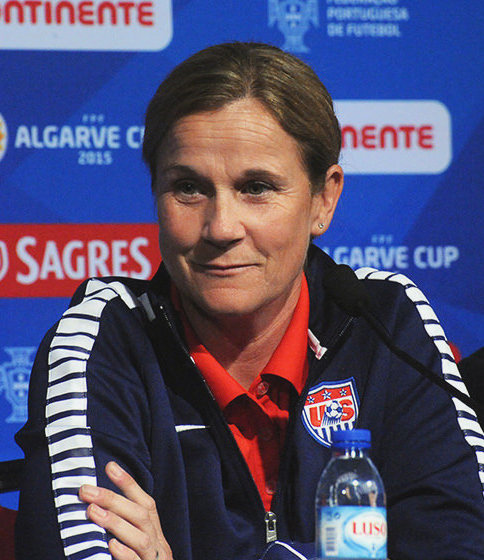
Jill Ellis

== Notable people ==
- Jill Ellis, head coach of the United States women's national soccer team
- Iggy Pop, singer, songwriter, musician, lyricist, record producer, and actor
- Sean Taylor, former professional football player, Washington Redskins
- Tito Rodriguez singer,songwriter,Orchestra Leader, Recording Artist

== Notable sites ==
- The Charles Deering Estate is situated on Old Cutler Road in Palmetto Bay. It served as the home of Charles Deering until 1927, when he died at the estate. Currently, the estate hosts cultural arts events and can be rented out for private events, such as weddings.
- Thalatta Estate Park, a Mediterranean Revival style house built in 1926 and preserved as a park by the Village.
