= Palmetto Estates, Florida =

- Census-designated place
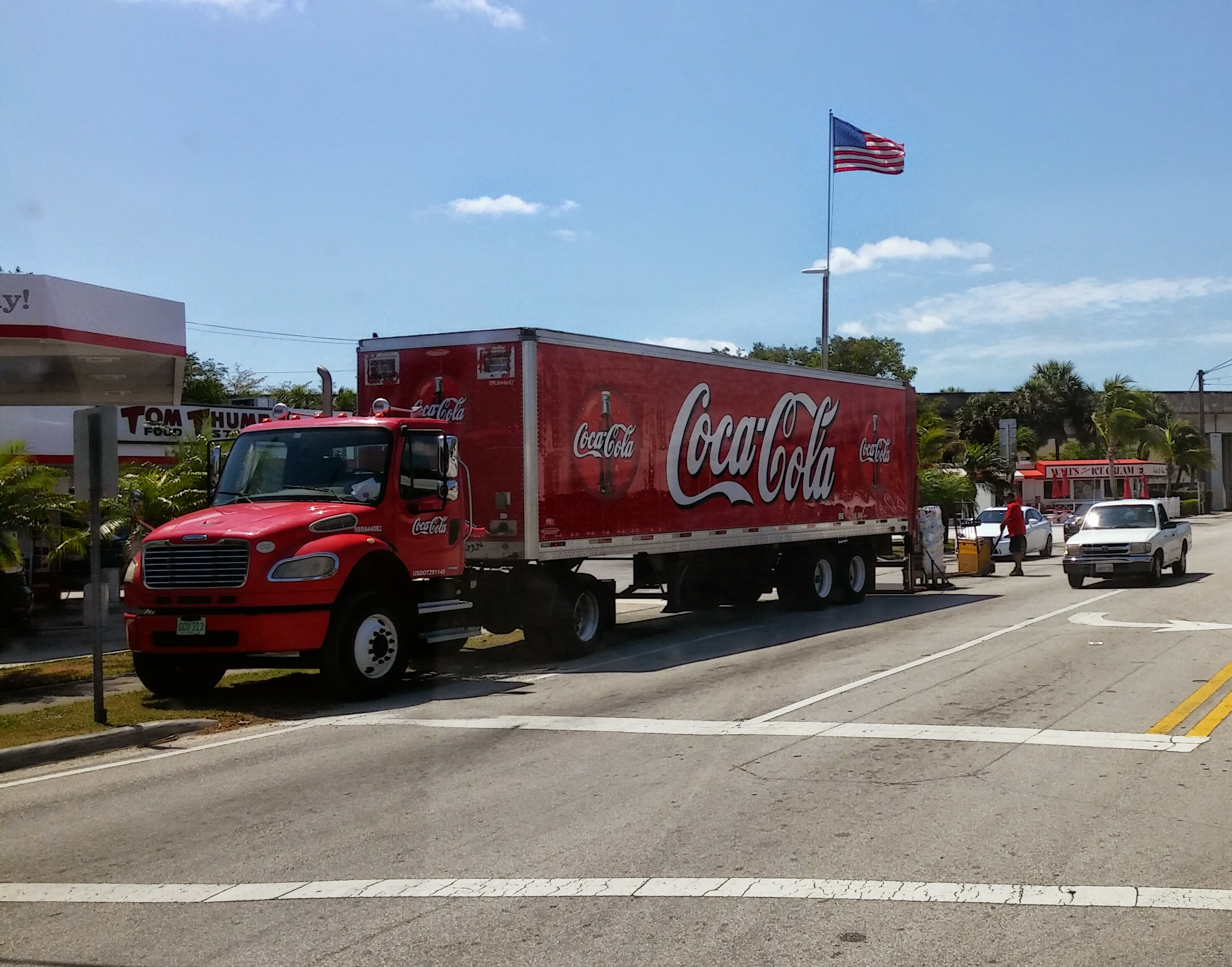

- Location in Miami-Dade County and the state of Florida

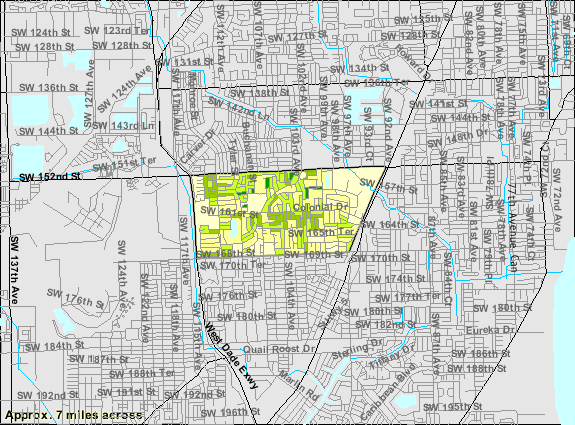
- U.S. Census Bureau map showing CDP boundaries
- Coordinates: 25°37′16″N 80°21′32″W
- Country: United States
- State: Florida
- County: Miami-Dade

Area
  - Total: 2.20 sq mi (5.71 km^{2})
  - Land: 2.16 sq mi (5.59 km^{2})
  - Water: 0.046 sq mi (0.12 km^{2})
- Elevation: 10 ft (3.0 m)

Population (2020)
  - Total: 13,498
  - Density: 6,254.0/sq mi (2,414.69/km^{2})
- Time zone: UTC-5 (Eastern (EST))
  - Summer (DST): UTC-4 (EDT)
- ZIP Code: 33157 (Miami)
- Area codes: 305, 786, 645
- FIPS code: 12-54300
- GNIS feature ID: 2403393

Palmetto Estates is an unincorporated area and census-designated place (CDP) in Miami-Dade County, Florida, United States. It is part of the Miami metropolitan area of South Florida. The population was 13,498 at the 2020 census.

== Geography ==
Palmetto Estates is located 15 miles (24 km) southwest of downtown Miami. It is bordered to the east by the village of Palmetto Bay. It is otherwise bordered by unincorporated communities: Kendal and Richmond Heights to the north, and West Perrine to the south. The western border is the Homestead Extension of Florida's Turnpike. U.S. Route 1 (Dixie Highway) runs along the eastern border.

According to the United States Census Bureau, the CDP has a total area of 8.44 square miles (21.9 km^{2}), of which 8.29 square miles (21.5 km^{2}) are land and 0.16 square miles (0.41 km^{2}), or 1.89%, are water.

== Demographics ==
Historical population
Census	Pop.	Note	%±
1980	11,116		—
1990	12,293		10.6%
2000	13,675		11.2%
2010	13,535		−1.0%
2020	13,498		−0.3%

=== Racial and ethnic composition ===
Palmetto Estates CDP, Florida – Racial and ethnic composition Note: the US Census treats Hispanic/Latino as an ethnic category. This table excludes Latinos from the racial categories and assigns them to a separate category. Hispanics/Latinos may be of any race.
Race / Ethnicity (NH = Non-Hispanic)	Pop 2010	Pop 2020	% 2010	% 2020
White (NH)	1,546	1,206	11.42%	8.93%
Black or African American (NH)	5,308	3,873	39.22%	28.69%
Native American or Alaska Native (NH)	10	17	0.07%	0.13%
Asian (NH)	444	326	3.28%	2.42%
Pacific Islander or Native Hawaiian (NH)	7	1	0.05%	0.01%
Some other race (NH)	74	152	0.55%	1.13%
Mixed race or Multiracial (NH)	306	338	2.26%	2.50%
Hispanic or Latino (any race)	5,840	7,585	43.15%	56.19%
Total	13,535	13,498	100.00%	100.00%

=== 2020 census ===
As of the 2020 census, Palmetto Estates had a population of 13,498. The median age was 44.6 years. 18.2% of residents were under the age of 18 and 18.3% of residents were 65 years of age or older. For every 100 females there were 91.9 males, and for every 100 females age 18 and over there were 90.1 males age 18 and over.

100.0% of residents lived in urban areas, while 0.0% lived in rural areas.

There were 4,159 households in Palmetto Estates, of which 33.4% had children under the age of 18 living in them. Of all households, 49.2% were married-couple households, 13.9% were households with a male householder and no spouse or partner present, and 28.0% were households with a female householder and no spouse or partner present. About 15.9% of all households were made up of individuals and 8.3% had someone living alone who was 65 years of age or older.

There were 4,261 housing units, of which 2.4% were vacant. The homeowner vacancy rate was 0.9% and the rental vacancy rate was 4.0%.

In the 2020 American Community Survey 5-year estimates, there were 3,233 families residing in the CDP.

=== 2010 census ===
As of the 2010 United States census, there were 13,535 people, 3,918 households, and 3,195 families residing in the CDP.

=== 2000 census ===
As of the census of 2000, there were 13,675 people, 4,054 households, and 3,344 families residing in the CDP. The population density was 6,437.3 inhabitants per square mile (2,485.5/km^{2}). There were 4,187 housing units at an average density of 1,971.0 per square mile (761.0/km^{2}). The racial makeup of the CDP was 37.68% White (16.9% were Non-Hispanic White), 48.77% African American, 0.21% Native American, 3.06% Asian, 0.01% Pacific Islander, 4.82% from other races, and 5.44% from two or more races. Hispanic or Latino of any race were 28.91% of the population.

As of 2000, there were 4,054 households, out of which 45.8% had children under the age of 18 living with them, 55.9% were married couples living together, 20.7% had a female householder with no husband present, and 17.5% were non-families. 13.7% of all households were made up of individuals, and 3.5% had someone living alone who was 65 years of age or older. The average household size was 3.35 and the average family size was 3.66.

In 2000, in the CDP, the population was spread out, with 31.2% under the age of 18, 9.1% from 18 to 24, 30.2% from 25 to 44, 22.1% from 45 to 64, and 7.5% who were 65 years of age or older. The median age was 33 years. For every 100 females, there were 92.6 males. For every 100 females age 18 and over, there were 88.8 males.

In 2000, the median income for a household in the CDP was $48,338, and the median income for a family was $49,565. Males had a median income of $31,440 versus $26,921 for females. The per capita income for the CDP was $16,701. About 7.8% of families and 10.9% of the population were below the poverty line, including 13.3% of those under age 18 and 11.7% of those age 65 or over.

As of 2000, speakers of English as a first language accounted for 65.94% of residents, while Spanish made up 29.75%, French Creole was at 2.08%, and French was the mother tongue of 0.88% of the population.
