= Lakes by the Bay, Florida =

- Neighborhood and former CDP
- Location in Miami-Dade County and the state of Florida

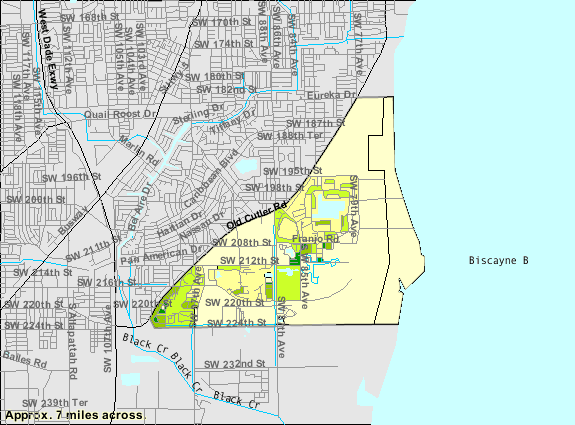
- U.S. Census Bureau map showing CDP boundaries
- Coordinates: 25°34′18″N 80°19′54″W
- Country: United States
- State: Florida
- County: Miami-Dade
- Town: Cutler Bay

Area
  - Total: 5.0 sq mi (12.9 km^{2})
  - Land: 4.9 sq mi (12.6 km^{2})
  - Water: 0.12 sq mi (0.3 km^{2})
- Elevation: 3.3 ft (1 m)

Population (2000)
  - Total: 9,055
  - Density: 1,818/sq mi (701.9/km^{2})
- Time zone: UTC-5 (Eastern (EST))
  - Summer (DST): UTC-4 (EDT)
- ZIP code: 33189
- FIPS code: 12-38718
- GNIS feature ID: 1867165

Lakes by the Bay is a neighborhood and former census-designated place (CDP) in Miami-Dade County, Florida, United States. The population was 9,055 at the 2000 census. In 2005, the area of the CDP was included in the town of Cutler Bay.

== History ==
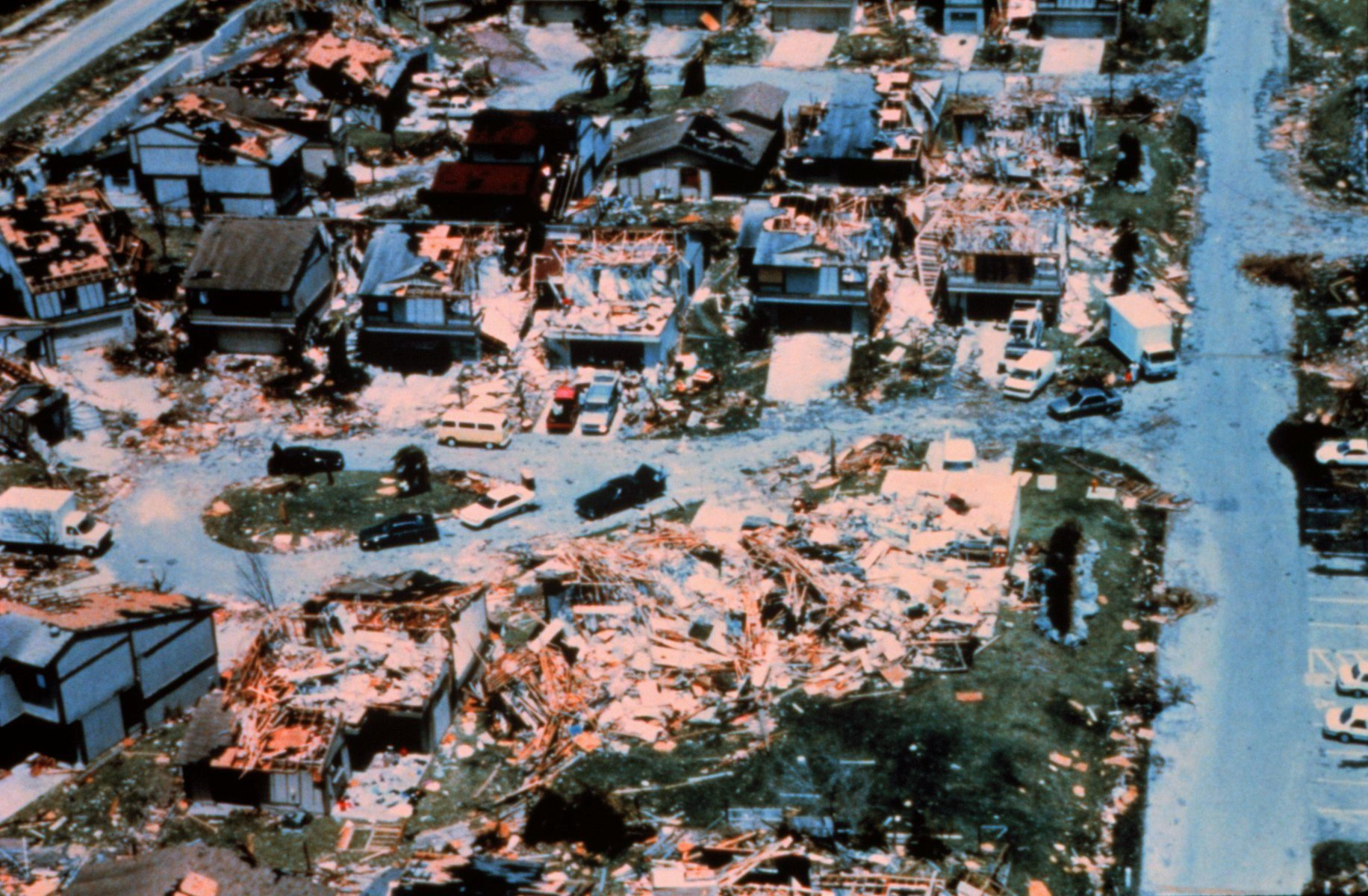
Damage from Hurricane Andrew in 1992 in Lakes by the Bay

In August 1992, Lakes by the Bay and the surrounding South Miami-Dade area were severely damaged by Hurricane Andrew. Most of the homes and businesses in the neighborhood were destroyed. In the subsequent years, the area was slowly rebuilt. Unlike the destroyed homes which were made of wood frame construction, the new homes and construction were rebuilt with concrete walls. Although many areas of Miami were heavily affected by Hurricane Andrew, Lakes by the Bay was one of the worst affected and remains a reminder of the hurricane's extensive disaster in the city today.

== Geography ==
According to the United States Census Bureau, the CDP had a total area of 4.9 square miles (13 km^{2}), of which, 4.8 square miles (12 km^{2}) was land and 0.1 square miles (0.26 km^{2}) of it – or 2.02% – water.

== Demographics ==
Historical population
Census	Pop.	Note	%±
1990	5,615		—
2000	9,055		61.3%

As of the census of 2000, there were 9,055 people, 3,271 households, and 2,319 families residing in the CDP. The population density was 1,866.2 inhabitants per square mile (720.5/km^{2}). There were 3,417 housing units at an average density of 704.2 per square mile (271.9/km^{2}). The racial makeup of the CDP was 72.92% White (of which 36.7% were Non-Hispanic White,) 15.36% African American, 0.18% Native American, 2.78% Asian, 0.10% Pacific Islander, 4.69% from other races, and 3.96% from two or more races. Hispanic or Latino of any race were 43.83% of the population.

There were 3,271 households, out of which 40.7% had children under the age of 18 living with them, 54.4% were married couples living together, 12.4% had a female householder with no husband present, and 29.1% were non-families. 23.1% of all households were made up of individuals, and 10.1% had someone living alone who was 65 years of age or older. The average household size was 2.77 and the average family size was 3.30.

In the CDP, the population was spread out, with 29.0% under the age of 18, 7.8% from 18 to 24, 35.7% from 25 to 44, 18.7% from 45 to 64, and 8.7% who were 65 years of age or older. The median age was 33 years. For every 100 females, there were 93.7 males. For every 100 females age 18 and over, there were 88.3 males.

The median income for a household in the CDP was $49,236, and the median income for a family was $53,616. Males had a median income of $37,129 versus $30,049 for females. The per capita income for the CDP was $20,708. About 7.8% of families and 10.1% of the population were below the poverty line, including 9.4% of those under age 18 and 26.2% of those age 65 or over.

As of 2000, speakers of English as a first language accounted for 52.57% of residents, while Spanish made up 44.50%, Arabic was at 1.90%, French was at 0.57%, and French Creole was 0.44% of the population.
