= Cutler Bay, Florida =

Town in the state of Florida, United States

- Town
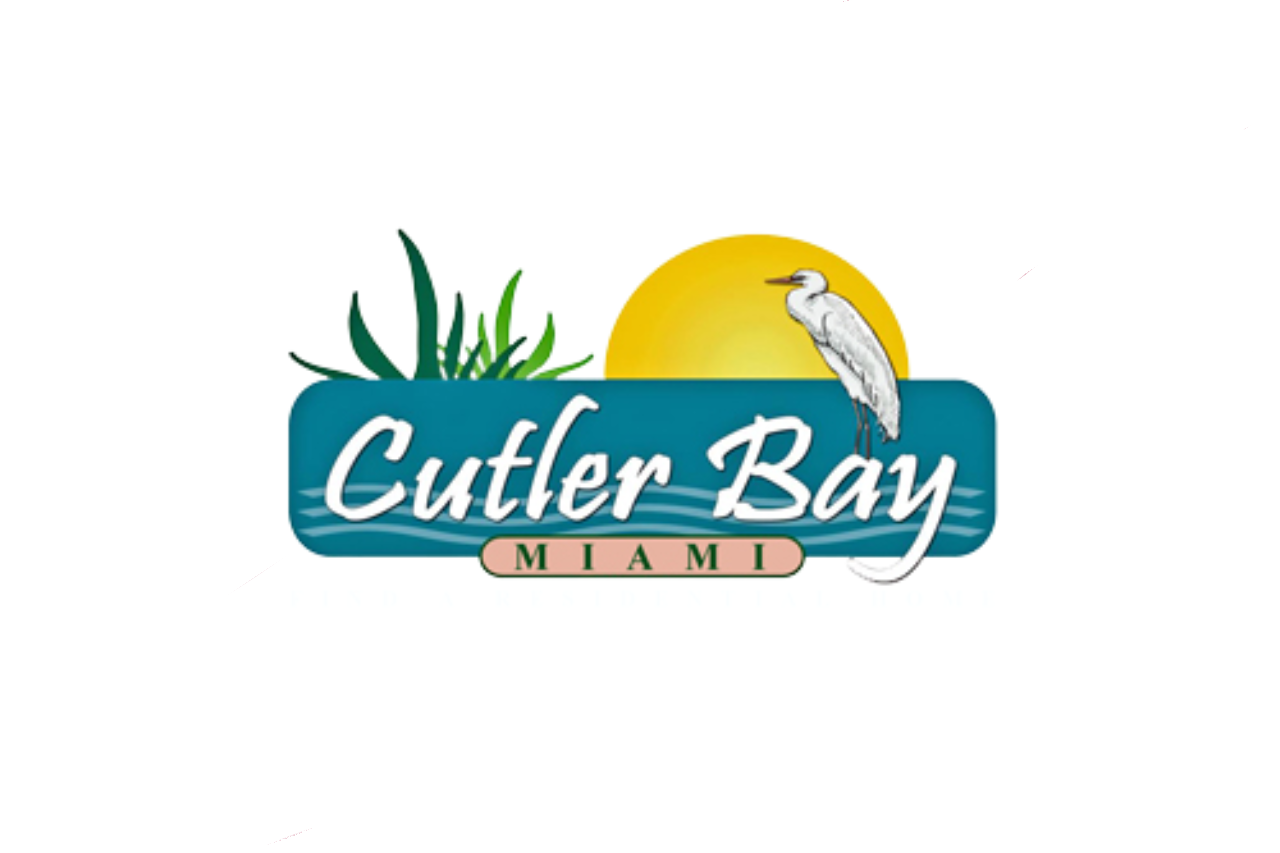
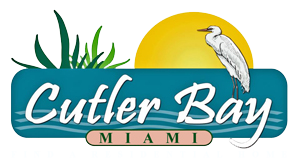
- Flag Seal
- Motto(s): "An Excellent Place to Live, Work and Play."
- Location in Miami-Dade County and the state of Florida
- Coordinates: 25°34′35″N 80°20′08″W
- Country: United States
- State: Florida
- County: Miami-Dade
- Settled (Cutler Ridge): c. 1825–1880
- Incorporated (Town of Culter Bay): November 9, 2005

Government
  - Type: Council-Manager

Area
  - Total: 10.29 sq mi (26.64 km^{2})
  - Land: 9.89 sq mi (25.61 km^{2})
  - Water: 0.40 sq mi (1.03 km^{2})
- Elevation: 7 ft (2.1 m)

Population (2020)
  - Total: 45,425
  - Density: 4,594.6/sq mi (1,773.99/km^{2})
- Time zone: UTC−5 (EST)
  - Summer (DST): UTC−4 (EDT)
- ZIP Codes: 33157, 33189, 33190
- Area codes: 305, 786, 645
- FIPS code: 12-15968
- GNIS feature ID: 2406348
- Website: www.cutlerbay-fl.gov

Cutler Bay is an incorporated town in Miami-Dade County, Florida, United States, established in 2005. With a population of 45,425 as of the 2020 US census, it is part of the Miami metropolitan area of South Florida. Cutler Bay is the 9th most populous of the 34 municipalities that make up Miami's urban core, and the 33rd most populous of the 163 municipalities.

== History ==
The town was named after Dr. William Cutler of Massachusetts, who visited the area north of the community, around 1880, and encouraged others to settle in what became the pioneer community of Cutler.

The Charles Deering Estate, located in nearby Palmetto Bay, contains the Cutler Fossil Site where mammoths, saber-toothed tigers and California condors are among the many fossil records. The park holds archeological evidence of Native American habitation of the land 10,000 years ago. Tequesta burial mounds are also found there. The area called Cutler Ridge had been called the "Hunting Ground" by some of the earliest Caucasian settlers in the area, circa 1825.

In the early 1900s, the Florida East Coast Railway was extended south to Cutler, which was located near what is now the Charles Deering Estate. Cutler then served as the place where people settling in the undeveloped Homestead area went to get their supplies.

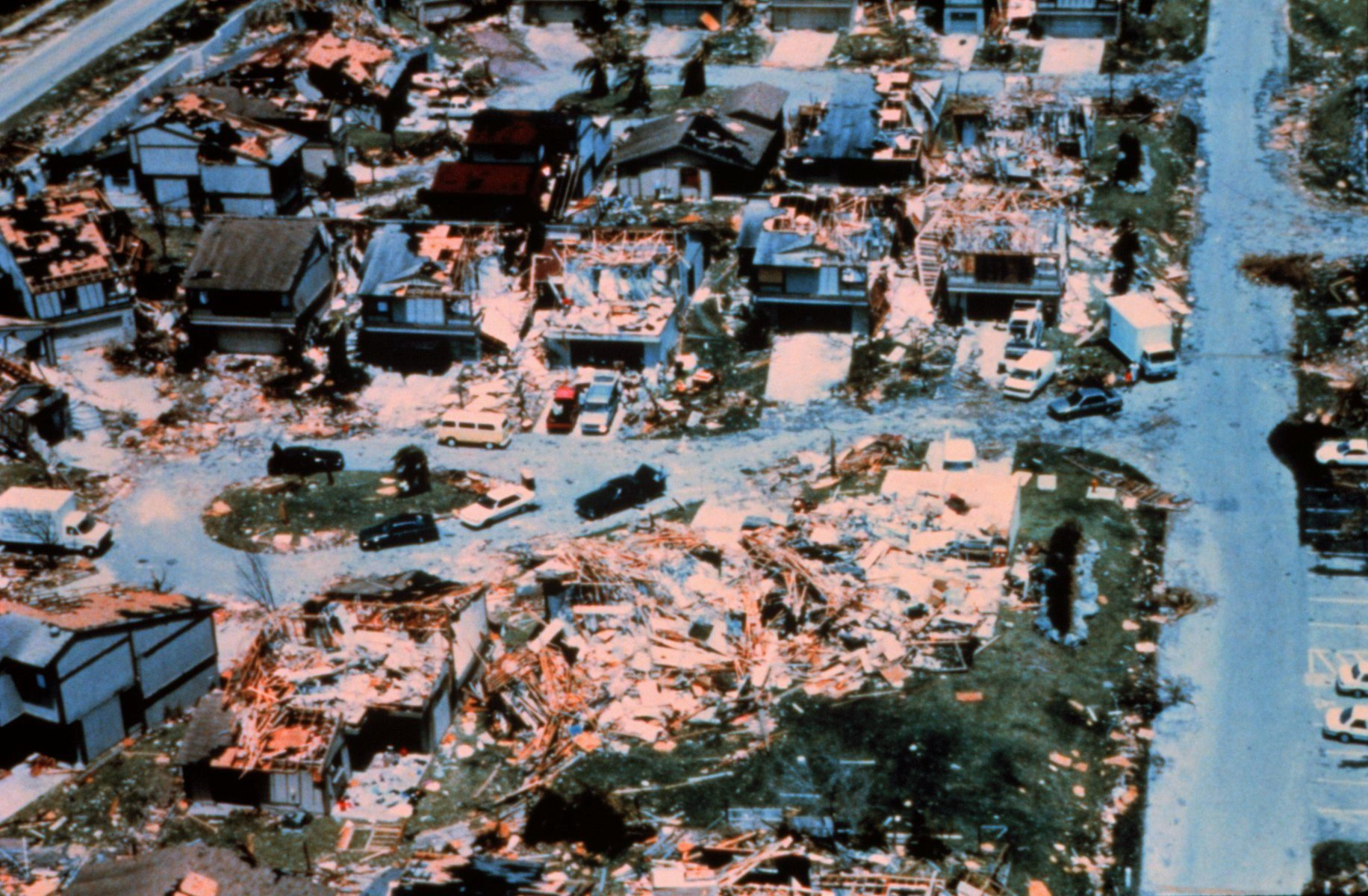
Damage from Hurricane Andrew in 1992, in the area now called Cutler Bay

In 1992, Hurricane Andrew made landfall near Cutler Ridge. The storm left the area in "almost total destruction". The dense vegetation near the shore and the dense subdivision development of the area are thought to have been factors which mitigated the extent of areas impacted by flood damage caused by Andrew. However, nearly every building suffered major damage from the wind, and the damage in Florida was estimated at $25 billion, the most expensive natural disaster in US history at the time.

In May 2002, the Cutler Bay Steering Committee company met to discuss the formation of a municipal advisory committee, where the committee would advise on the incorporation of the Cutler Ridge area into the city of Cutler Ridge. The decision to incorporate was spurred in part by the efforts to recover from Hurricane Andrew. The proposed incorporation boundaries included Southwest 184th Street on the north and Southwest 216th and 224th streets on the south. In addition, the west boundary would include Florida's Turnpike, U.S. 1, Southwest 112th Avenue, and Biscayne Bay would serve as the east boundary.

In April 2005, the Charter committee members looked at over a dozen names for the city, ranging from "Pine Ridge" and "Cutler Bay" to just "Cutler". They reduced the choices to "Cutler Ridge" and "Old Cutler Bay". On November 9, 2005, voters approved the charter and chose the name "Cutler Bay" for the county's 35th municipality, over "Cutler Ridge" by a vote of 1,920 to 1,403. In the months following the name change, many of those born and raised in the area that had been known as Cutler Ridge since the 1870s, refused to accept the new name.

== Geography ==
The Town of Cutler Bay is located just west of Biscayne Bay and 18 miles (29 km) southwest of downtown Miami.

The town's northern border runs from SW 184th Street (Eureka Drive) east of US 1 to the coast. The southern border is SW 232nd Street, north of Black Point Marina, the largest public marina in the Miami area. The town's boundaries include the northeast section of Biscayne National Park, areas formerly known as Cutler Ridge to the west, and the neighborhood and former CDP of Lakes by the Bay to the east. The town is bordered to the north by the village of Palmetto Bay, to the west by unincorporated South Miami Heights, and to the southwest by unincorporated Goulds.

According to the United States Census Bureau, the town of Cutler Bay has a total area of 10.3 square miles (27 km^{2}). 9.9 square miles (26 km^{2}) of it are land and 0.4 square miles (1.0 km^{2}) of it (3.87%) are water.

Cutler Ridge, an ancient coral formation, stretches from south Miami, where it rises approximately 22 feet (6.7 m) above sea level, through the Cutler Bay area, at a height of 14 feet (4.3 m), to Homestead, Florida, where it is about 8 feet (2.4 m). Cutler Ridge has been incorporated into the hurricane emergency plans for the area as lands east of the ridge are subject to storm surge, but areas west of the ridge would generally be protected.

Due to Cutler Bay's position in a flat, low-lying coastal wetland area on Biscayne Bay, the area is prone to flooding. During the rainy season, Cutler Bay's many canals, channels, and lakes are frequently full of water, and the groundwater table also is full and close to the surface. Flood hazards include rainfall from tropical storms, hurricanes, and other heavy rain events.

=== Surrounding areas ===
Palmetto Bay
West Perrine Palmetto Bay
Unincorporated Miami-Dade County, South Miami Heights, Goulds Biscayne Bay
Goulds, Princeton Lakes by the Bay
Unincorporated Miami-Dade County, Lakes by the Bay

=== Climate ===
Cutler Bay has a tropical climate, similar to the climate found in much of the Caribbean. It is part of the only region in the 48 contiguous states that falls under that category. More specifically, it generally has a tropical monsoon climate (Köppen climate classification, Am).

== Demographics ==
Historical population
Census	Pop.	Note	%±
1960	7,005		—
1970	17,441		149.0%
1980	20,886		19.8%
1990	21,268		1.8%
2000	24,781		16.5%
2010	40,286		62.6%
2020	45,425		12.8%
U.S. Decennial Census

=== Racial and ethnic composition ===
Cutler Bay racial composition (Hispanics excluded from racial categories) (NH = Non-Hispanic)
Race	Pop 2010	Pop 2020	% 2010	% 2020
White (NH)	11,468	9,536	28.47%	20.99%
Black or African American (NH)	5,137	4,147	12.75%	9.13%
Native American or Alaska Native (NH)	31	20	0.08%	0.04%
Asian (NH)	881	949	2.19%	2.09%
Pacific Islander or Native Hawaiian (NH)	26	12	0.06%	0.03%
Some other race (NH)	149	318	0.37%	0.70%
Two or more races/Multiracial (NH)	658	1,149	1.63%	2.53%
Hispanic or Latino (any race)	21,936	29,294	54.45%	64.49%
Total	40,286	45,425	100.00%	100.00%

=== 2020 census ===
As of the 2020 census, Cutler Bay had a population of 45,425. The median age was 40.3 years. 22.0% of residents were under the age of 18 and 15.5% were 65 years of age or older. For every 100 females there were 91.4 males, and for every 100 females age 18 and over there were 87.2 males age 18 and over.

100.0% of residents lived in urban areas, while 0.0% lived in rural areas.

There were 15,361 households in Cutler Bay, of which 39.5% had children under the age of 18 living in them. Of all households, 50.4% were married-couple households, 13.8% were households with a male householder and no spouse or partner present, and 27.4% were households with a female householder and no spouse or partner present. About 19.3% of all households were made up of individuals and 10.1% had someone living alone who was 65 years of age or older.

There were 15,953 housing units, of which 3.7% were vacant. The homeowner vacancy rate was 1.4% and the rental vacancy rate was 4.9%.

=== 2010 census ===
As of the 2010 United States census, there were 40,286 people, 12,374 households, and 9,124 families residing in the town.

In 2010, the population distribution was: 6.8% under 5 years old, 25.8% under the age of 18, and 10.6% 65 years of age or older. Females were 51.7% of the population. The median income for a household was $61.370. The per capita income for the town was $25,193. About 10.5% of the population were below the poverty line.

=== American Community Survey estimates ===
According to 2020 American Community Survey estimates, there were 10,305 families residing in the town.

According to the latest American Community Survey of 2008–2012 conducted by the US Census Bureau, the percentage of people who spoke English as their main language was of 44.1%, while Spanish speakers were at 50.4% of the population, and other languages accounted for 5.5%.

=== 2000 census ===
As of 2000, speakers of English as a first language accounted for 58.89%, while Spanish made up 38.18%, and French Creole comprised 1.31% of the population.

== Government and infrastructure ==
Cutler Bay is governed by a five-member Town Council and operates under a Council-Manager form of government. Three Council Members are elected to represent specific residential areas (Seats 1, 2 & 3) and must reside in their respective area. The Mayor and the Vice Mayor may reside anywhere in the Town. Town Council elections are non-partisan. As the legislative body of the Town, the Town Council determines policy, adopts the annual budget and makes laws. The Miami-Dade Sheriff’s Office operates the South District Station in Cutler Bay.

In January 2006, Cutler Bay elected former Florida state legislator John Cosgrove as its first mayor. Mayor Cosgrove died on April 19, 2006, while vacationing in Zimbabwe. Vice Mayor Paul Vrooman assumed the position of Mayor. In November 2010, Edward P. MacDougall was elected Mayor from Vice Mayor. Prior to incorporation Edward MacDougall chaired the municipal charter committee which set the Town's charter. In November 2014, Peggy Bell, who was one of the original Council Members when Cutler Bay was incorporated, was elected Mayor and served as Mayor until she reached her term limits in November 2018. Elected in November 2018, the current office of Mayor is held by former Council member Tim Meerbott.

The community bought an office building, Cutler Bay Town Center, circa 2010; in 2020 the building was about 33% occupied. The city government planned to make money by leasing space in the building, but buyers did not materialize. In 2020, with the support of many residents, the Town traded the building for 16 acres (6.5 ha) of land, with the vision to transform it into a park and municipal complex.

== Education ==
=== Primary and secondary schools ===
Miami-Dade County Public Schools operates public schools.

Elementary schools in the town limits include:

- Bel-Aire Elementary School
- Cutler Ridge Elementary School
- Dr. Edward L. Whigham Elementary School
- Gulfstream Elementary School
- Whispering Pines Elementary School

Cutler Ridge Middle School and Cutler Bay Senior High School are in Cutler Bay.

Prior to 2012, Cutler Bay had two public middle schools (Centennial and Cutler Ridge), and Miami Southridge High School was the zoned public high school. Centennial Middle School was converted into Cutler Bay High School and Cutler Ridge Middle School became the sole middle school of Cutler Bay.

The charter school, Mater Academy Cutler Bay, is in Cutler Bay.

The Roman Catholic Archdiocese of Miami operates Catholic schools. Our Lady of the Holy Rosary-St. Richard School, a K–8 school, is in Cutler Bay.

=== Colleges and universities ===
- College of Business and Technology (Cutler Bay Campus)

== Media ==
The Miami Herald provides news coverage for the town under the Cutler Bay heading of its "Miami-Dade Communities" section.
