= Henry Perrine =

American physician and horticulturalist (1797–1840)

Henry Perrine (5 April 1797 – 7 August 1840) was a medical doctor, horticulturist, United States Consul in Campeche, Campeche, Mexico, and an enthusiast for introducing tropical plants into cultivation in the United States.

== Early life ==
Henry Edward Perrine was born April 5, 1797, at either New Brunswick, New Jersey or Cranbury, New Jersey, a son of Peter and Sarah Rozengrant Perrine, and a descendant of Daniel Perrin, "The Huguenot". He taught school for two years while still a youth, studied medicine, and then at age 22 moved to Ripley, Illinois where he practiced medicine for five years. In 1821 he was accidentally poisoned with arsenic, from which he never fully recovered. He married Ann Fuller Townsend in 1822 while living in Illinois.

== Studies of quinine ==
Cold weather particularly bothered Perrine after his arsenic poisoning, and in 1824 he moved to Natchez, Mississippi (leaving his family in Illinois) in the hope that the climate would aid his recovery. He began studying herbs and medicinal plants while in Natchez. Malaria was common in the Natchez area, and Perrine began studying the use of quinine to treat it. He published the results of his research in the Philadelphia Journal of the Medical and Physical Sciences in 1826, and that report remained an important source on the subject for a century. In 1825 Perrine and his family moved to his wife Ann's hometown of Sodus, New York. Believing that he needed to move to a climate even warmer than that of Natchez, Perrine had applied in 1824 for a diplomatic position in a tropical country. In 1827 he sent copies of his report on the use of quinine to Washington. Shortly thereafter he was appointed United States Consul in Campeche, Mexico, where he served for ten years.

== Mexico to the Florida Keys ==
Soon after Perrine arrived in Campeche, the United States Treasury Department asked all U. S. Consuls to find useful plants that could be introduced to the United States. Perrine began investigating tropical crops for introduction into the United States. He sent seeds and plants to people he corresponded with in the southern United States, some of his specimens now reside at the New York Botanical Garden. Perrine was the only U.S. Consul to respond to the Treasury Department's request, and newspapers in the United States began writing about his work. Through correspondence with Captain John DuBose, the keeper at the Cape Florida Light, with Charles Howe, postmaster and inspector of customs at Indian Key and with William A. Whitehead, mayor of Key West, Florida, Perrine became convinced that the southern tip of Florida was the only place in the United States suitable for the introduction of tropical plants. While still in Campeche and on his return to the United States, he campaigned for a land grant on which he could start a plant introduction station. Upon his return to the United States, Perrine was offered a site in Louisiana for his plant introduction station, but he rejected it, believing that only southern Florida offered the necessary climate conditions. Perrine, Judge James Webb of Key West and Charles Howe of Indian Key incorporated the Tropical Plant Company, which was chartered by the territory of Florida in 1838. Also in 1838, the United States Congress granted Perrine his request for a survey township (36 sq. mi.) in southern Florida.

While waiting for hostilities with the Seminoles to die down so that his land grant could be surveyed and settled, Perrine had in late 1838 taken up residence with his family on Indian Key in the Florida Keys. While resident on Indian Key, Perrine started a tropical plant nursery on Lower Matecumbe Key. He also visited the settlement at Key Vaca to treat the Bahamians living there, and to try to convince them to grow some of the tropical plants he was trying to establish in Florida. In April, 1840 Perrine spent several days on and near Cape Sable planting seeds despite the presence of Seminoles in the area (his party could see the light of a campfire one night as they camped on the cape).

== Death ==
On August 7, 1840, Indians attacked Indian Key. The Perrines were awoken by gunfire and shouts. Henry Perrine sent his family into the space under the house and then covered the trap-door with a chest. Ann Perrine and the three children moved to the enclosed turtle crawl under the wharf behind the house. They were able to take a boat that had been partly loaded with plunder by the Seminoles, and head for the United States Navy base on nearby Tea Table Key. They were chased by two Seminoles in a canoe, but were rescued by sailors in a whale boat. Dr. Perrine was killed in his house, which was burned by the Seminoles. Several other people on the island were also killed. Some bones found in the burned ruins of the Perrine house were buried on Lower Matecumbe Key.

== Legacy ==
Perrine had apparently selected Cape Sable as the site of his grant, but after his death his widow successfully petitioned to have the grant transferred to the shore of Biscayne Bay, and to remain with the Perrine family. Part of the Perrine Grant eventually became the community of Perrine, Florida. Perrine introduced the Key lime to the United States and it has been subsequently used to develop many citrus hybrids.
