= South Miami Heights, Florida =

- Census-designated place
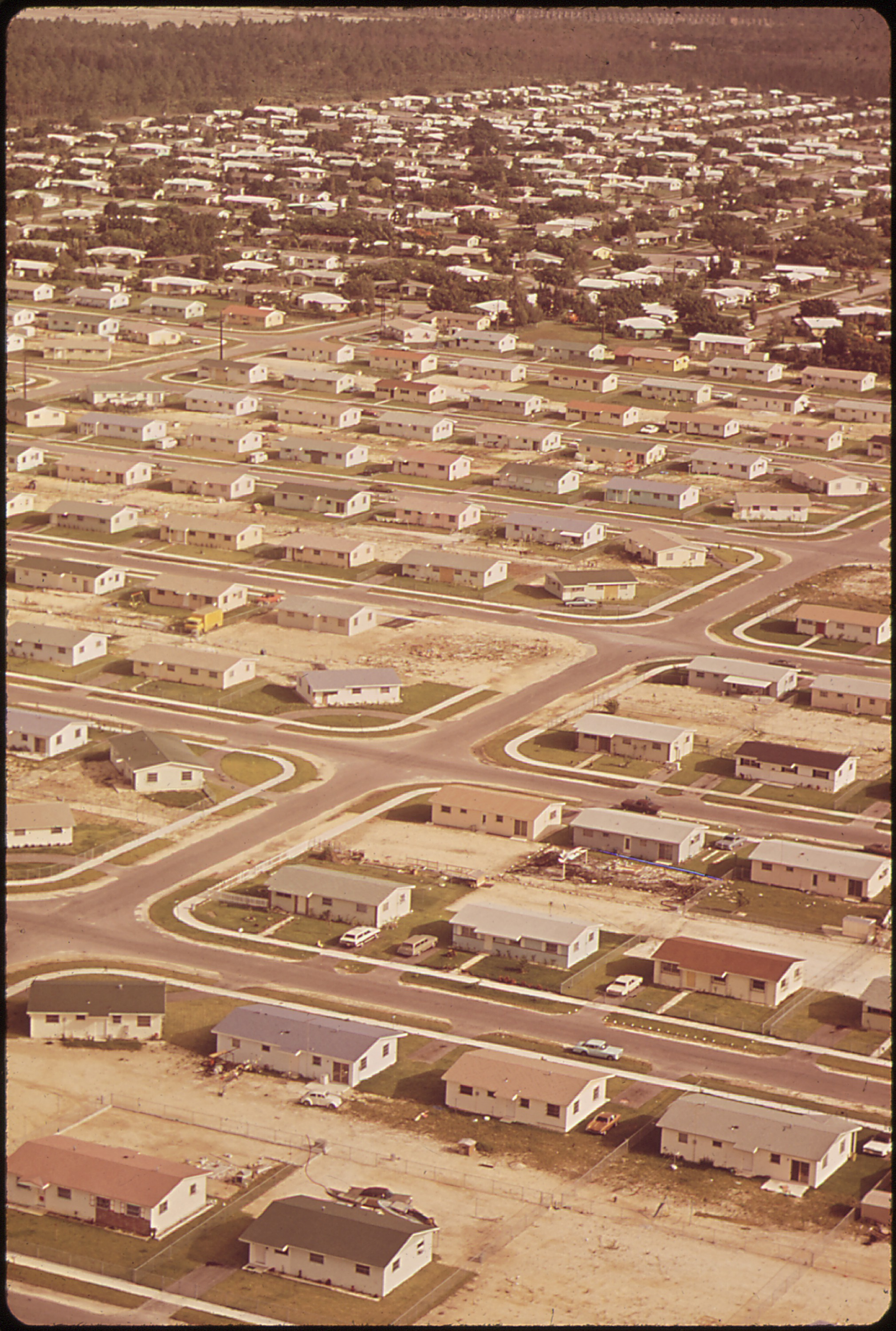
- South Miami Heights in 1972

- Location in Miami-Dade County and the state of Florida

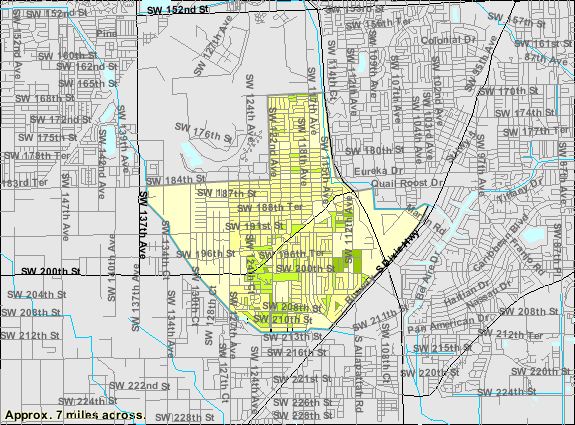
- U.S. Census Bureau map showing CDP boundaries
- Coordinates: 25°35′15″N 80°22′47″W
- Country: United States
- State: Florida
- County: Miami-Dade

Area
  - Total: 4.98 sq mi (12.91 km^{2})
  - Land: 4.91 sq mi (12.71 km^{2})
  - Water: 0.077 sq mi (0.20 km^{2})
- Elevation: 10 ft (3.0 m)

Population (2020)
  - Total: 36,770
  - Density: 7,492.2/sq mi (2,892.74/km^{2})
- Time zone: UTC-5 (Eastern (EST))
  - Summer (DST): UTC-4 (EDT)
- ZIP codes: 33157, 33177, 33189 (Miami)
- Area codes: 305, 786, 645
- FIPS code: 12-67575
- GNIS feature ID: 2402874

South Miami Heights is a census-designated place (CDP), originally known as Eureka, in Miami-Dade County, Florida. It is part of the Miami metropolitan area of South Florida. The population was 36,770 as of the 2020 census.

== Geography ==
South Miami Heights is located 17 miles (27 km) southwest of downtown Miami. It is bordered to the east by Cutler Bay, to the south by Goulds, to the northwest by Richmond West, and to the northeast by West Perrine. It is bordered to the north by Thompson Memorial Park and Zoo Miami.

According to the United States Census Bureau, the CDP has a total area of 5.0 square miles (13 km^{2}), of which 0.08 square miles (0.21 km^{2}), or 1.52%, are water.

== Demographics ==
Historical population
Census	Pop.	Note	%±
1970	10,395		—
1980	23,559		126.6%
1990	30,030		27.5%
2000	33,522		11.6%
2010	35,696		6.5%
2020	36,770		3.0%

=== Racial and ethnic composition ===
South Miami Heights CDP, Florida – Racial and ethnic composition Note: the US Census treats Hispanic/Latino as an ethnic category. This table excludes Latinos from the racial categories and assigns them to a separate category. Hispanics/Latinos may be of any race.
Race / Ethnicity (NH = Non-Hispanic)	Pop 2000	Pop 2010	Pop 2020	% 2000	% 2010	% 2020
White alone (NH)	3,746	2,561	2,119	11.17%	7.17%	5.76%
Black or African American alone (NH)	9,507	7,792	5,285	28.36%	21.83%	14.37%
Native American or Alaska Native alone (NH)	40	47	31	0.12%	0.13%	0.08%
Asian alone (NH)	603	514	444	1.80%	1.44%	1.21%
Native Hawaiian or Pacific Islander alone (NH)	4	4	2	0.01%	0.01%	0.01%
Other race alone (NH)	161	127	231	0.48%	0.36%	0.63%
Mixed race or Multiracial (NH)	632	393	433	1.89%	1.10%	1.18%
Hispanic or Latino (any race)	18,829	24,258	28,225	56.17%	67.96%	76.76%
Total	33,522	35,696	36,770	100.00%	100.00%	100.00%

=== 2020 census ===
As of the 2020 census, South Miami Heights had a population of 36,770. The median age was 42.8 years. 19.7% of residents were under the age of 18 and 18.6% of residents were 65 years of age or older. For every 100 females there were 91.9 males, and for every 100 females age 18 and over there were 88.3 males age 18 and over.

100.0% of residents lived in urban areas, while 0.0% lived in rural areas.

There were 11,600 households in South Miami Heights, of which 35.7% had children under the age of 18 living in them. Of all households, 43.6% were married-couple households, 15.3% were households with a male householder and no spouse or partner present, and 31.0% were households with a female householder and no spouse or partner present. About 17.5% of all households were made up of individuals and 9.3% had someone living alone who was 65 years of age or older.

There were 12,007 housing units, of which 3.4% were vacant. The homeowner vacancy rate was 0.6% and the rental vacancy rate was 4.7%.

Racial composition as of the 2020 census
Race	Number	Percent
White	8,762	23.8%
Black or African American	5,656	15.4%
American Indian and Alaska Native	114	0.3%
Asian	464	1.3%
Native Hawaiian and Other Pacific Islander	2	0.0%
Some other race	4,752	12.9%
Two or more races	17,020	46.3%

=== 2010 census ===
As of the 2010 United States census, there were 35,696 people, 10,558 households, and 8,485 families residing in the CDP.

=== 2000 census ===
As of the census of 2000, there were 33,522 people, 9,931 households, and 7,994 families residing in the CDP. The population density was 6,800.4 people per square mile (2,625.3/km^{2}). There were 10,364 housing units at an average density of 2,102.5/sq mi (811.7/km^{2}). The racial makeup of the CDP was 55.47% White (11.2% Non-Hispanic White), 30.32% African American, 0.28% Native American, 1.83% Asian, 0.02% Pacific Islander, 6.85% from other races, and 5.23% from two or more races. Hispanic or Latino of any race were 56.17% of the population.

As of 2000, there were 9,931 households out of which 43.7% had children under the age of 18 living with them, 51.3% were married couples living together, 22.7% had a female householder with no husband present, and 19.5% were non-families. 15.6% of all households were made up of individuals and 6.2% had someone living alone who was 65 years of age or older. The average household size was 3.34 and the average family size was 3.68.

In 2000, in the CDP the population was spread out with 30.6% under the age of 18, 9.8% from 18 to 24, 29.3% from 25 to 44, 20.8% from 45 to 64, and 9.5% who were 65 years of age or older. The median age was 32 years. For every 100 females there were 93.3 males. For every 100 females age 18 and over, there were 88.4 males.

In 2000, the median income for a household in the CDP was $34,899, and the median income for a family was $37,457. Males had a median income of $25,768 versus $22,080 for females. The per capita income for the CDP was $12,315. About 14.8% of families and 17.2% of the population were below the poverty line, including 20.9% of those under age 18 and 24.3% of those age 65 or over.

As of 2000, speakers of Spanish as a first language accounted for 58.06% of residents, while English made up 40.16%, French was at 0.94%, and French Creole was the mother tongue of 0.81% of the population.
