= Silver Palm Schoolhouse =

- U.S. National Register of Historic Places
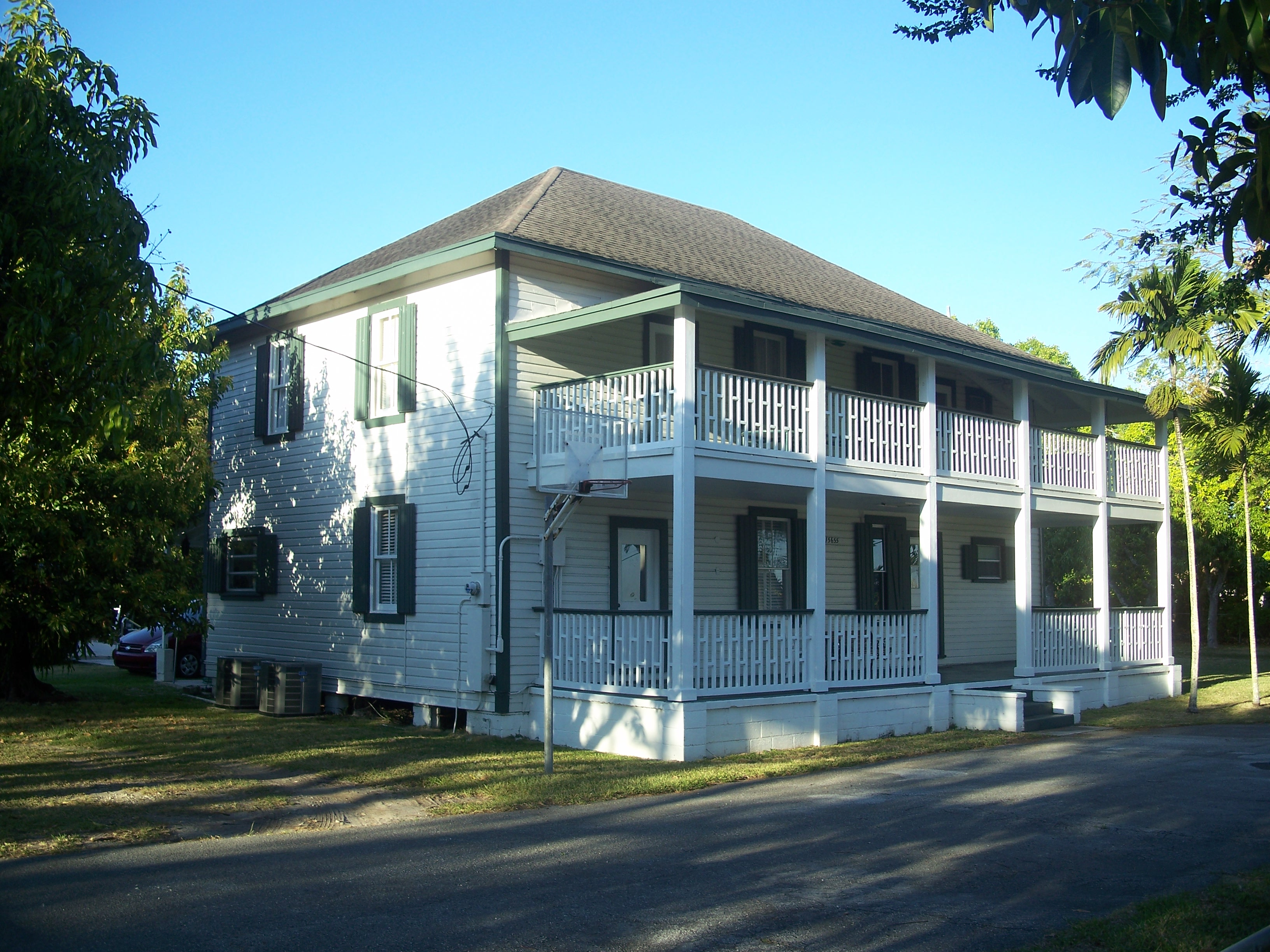

- Location within Florida Location within the United States
- Location: Redland, Florida
- Coordinates: 25°33′3″N 80°26′43″W
- Built: 1904
- NRHP reference No.: 87000581
- Added to NRHP: July 2, 1987

Location in Miami Dade County

The Silver Palm Schoolhouse is an historic school in the Silver Palm Historic District within the unincorporated community of Redland, Florida, United States. It is located at Silver Palm Drive and Newton Road. On July 2, 1987, it was added to the U.S. National Register of Historic Places. The Silver Palm Schoolhouse, constructed in 1904 by local residents, is a two-story structure that was the first and largest of seven rural schools that were built in the Redlands. The first floor was used for school, while the second floor for church and public gatherings.

A one-room schoolhouse constructed around 1902 originally served the youth of this area after area residents were able to find 10 students, allowing them to be assigned a teacher by the Board of Public Instruction of Dade County. However, several sources state that this structure burned down in 1903. After the Silver Palm Schoolhouse opened in 1904, it operated as a school until 1916, when it and the other six rural schools were consolidated into the Redland Farm Life School. Thereafter, the schoolhouse became a private residence.

== History and description ==
Non-indigenous settlers began residing in southern Miami-Dade County (then known as Dade County) in the late 19th century. Enough families with children arrived in the Redland area by 1902 that a school seemed warranted. Area residents quickly constructed a one-room wooden schoolhouse near the intersection of Newton Drive and Silver Palm Drive. Before the school board would allocate a teacher, the area's residents needed ten students. With only nine school-age children in the vicinity, they scoured until finding a tenth. Eventually, the school was erected and class began. The Board of Public Instruction of Dade County assigned Henry Proctor to be the teacher, as the school had 10 enrollees.

John M. Caldwell and Frank Adams sold 1 acre (0.40 ha) of land in 1902 to the Board of Public Instruction of Dade County. Local residents again worked on building another schoolhouse, this time a two-story frame structure. It is located 15655 Southwest 232nd Street (also known as Silver Palm Drive). The structure was the first and largest of seven rural schools that were built in Redland. The first floor was used for school, while the second floor for church and public gatherings. These seven schools, located in Eureka, Goulds, Modello, Murray Hill, Princeton, and Redland, merged and established the Redland Farmlife Consolidated School, a structure built at Coconut Palm Drive and Farmlife Road on land donated by Will Anderson.

The Silver Palm Schoolhouse became private property in 1919 when the Board of Public Instruction of Dade County sold it to Dr. W. W. Cunnyngham (sic) and family. It then became a boarding house in the 1930s after the interior was converted into five apartment units. The home remained within the family for more than 50 years, until it was sold to Peter and Kathleen B. Hoffman in 1976. For several years, the Hoffmans operated a daycare center there. On July 2, 1987, the Silver Palm Schoolhouse was added to the U.S. National Register of Historic Places. It is also part of the Silver Palm Historic District. During Hurricane Andrew in 1992, the schoolhouse suffered relatively minor damage compared to other nearby historic structures, limited to the loss of a few railings on the porch.

== See also ==
- National Register of Historic Places listings in Miami-Dade County, Florida
