= Redland Farm Life School =

Coordinates: 25.5369°N 80.453°W

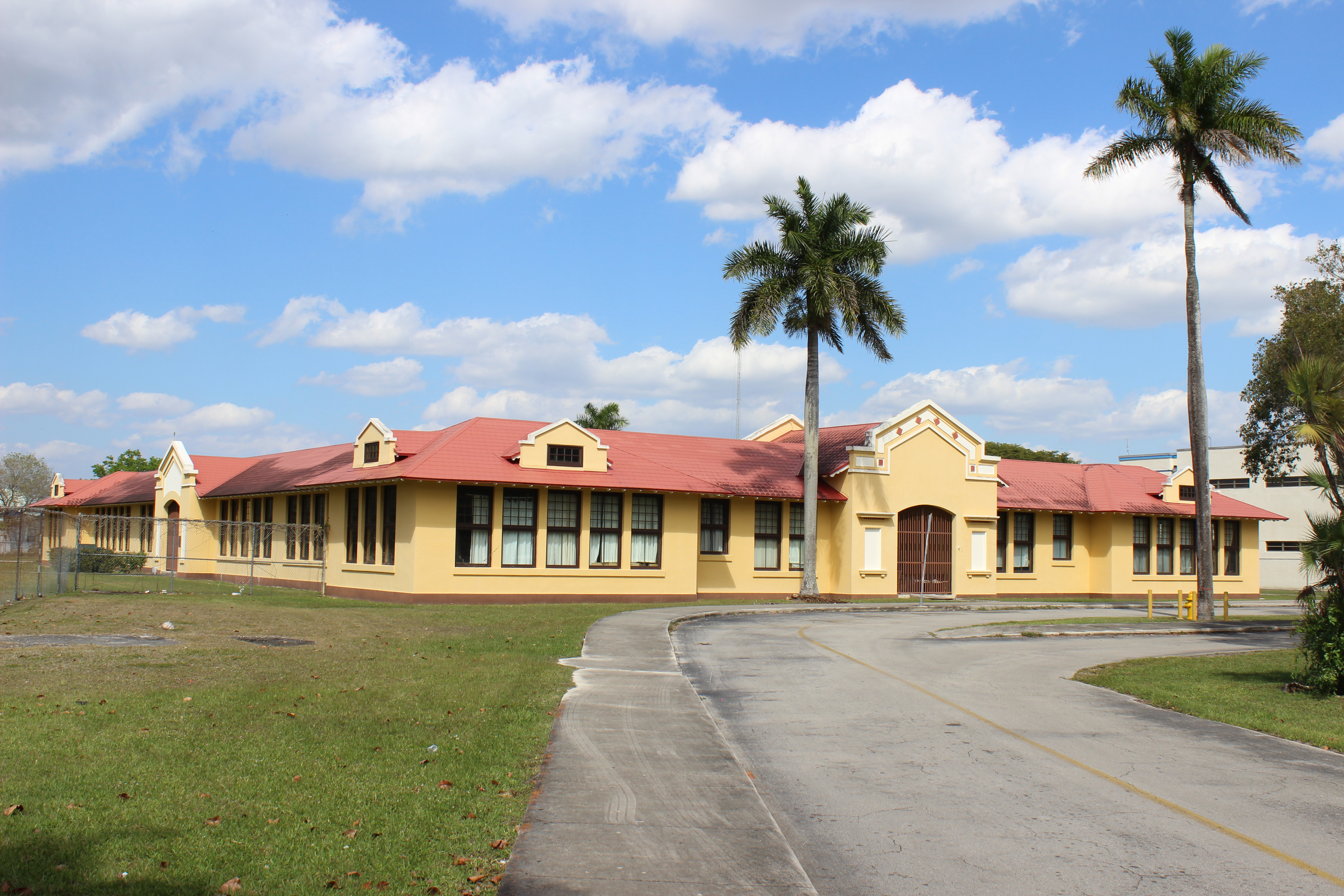

Location
- 16001 S.W. 248th Street; Redland, Florida

Information
- School type: Consolidated School (1917-1953); Elementary School (1953-1992)
- Founded: 1917
- Closed: 1992
- School board: Miami-Dade County Public Schools
- Grades: 1–12 (1916-1953); 1-8 (1953-1958); 1-6 (1958-1983; 1-5 (1983-1992)
- Language: English
- Colors: Orange and Black
- Mascot: Diamondback rattlesnake
- Team name: Rattlers

The Redland Farm Life School, also known as the Redland Farmlife School, is a historic former school in Redland, Florida, in southern Miami-Dade County. Opened in 1916, it consolidated seven one-room schoolhouses in the area and was at the time the second largest rural consolidated school in the country.

== History ==
Students in the school home economics classroom working with two-burner gas stoves at “kitchen compartments” in 1918.

In 1916, William Anderson, the proprietor of the Anderson's Corner general store, donated 10 acres of land at the northeast corner of SW 248th Street (Coconut Palm Drive) and SW 162nd Avenue (Farm Life School Road) to the Dade County School Board for the construction of a new consolidated school. Dr. Hyram Byrd, the assistant state health officer of Florida, who came to Dade County from Jacksonville for his health and to experiment with the use of rattlesnake venom as an antidote to snake bites, was instrumental in securing an agricultural school land grant under the Morrill Act of 1862 to help finance the project.

Dedicated while still under construction by Florida governor Sidney Johnston Catts on the Fourth of July, 1916, the Redland Farm Life School opened its doors to 195 students on October 16, 1916, consolidating one-room schools from Redland, Goulds, Eureka, Modello, Princeton, Murray Hill, and Silver Palm into a single modern educational facility with classrooms for grades one through twelve. The school contained indoor bathrooms, electric lighting, drinking fountains, a science laboratory, a home economics department, cloak rooms, a cafeteria, and a stand-alone 3200-square-foot (300 m^{2}) auditorium that seated 300 people. Area children living in outlying areas were for the first time transported by bus. The buses consisted of a slatted, roofed “cattle car” type of trailer with seats for 85 children hauled by a separate tractor. The school had separate teachers for grades one through eight, along with a small high school and an agricultural program.

The school eventually became the focus of virtually all activity in Redland, acting as a de facto community center. Residents gathered at the school for holiday fairs, elections, dances, and agricultural meetings. The property also served as a playground for neighborhood children.

Originally an L-shaped structure, an addition was built in 1939 to make the building U-shaped. In 1953, grades 9-12 and the agricultural curriculum moved to the newly constructed South Dade High School three miles to the south. In 1958, Redland Junior High School opened in newer construction just to the east of the school, and the ninth grade returned to the new junior high from South Dade. In 1983, the ninth grade was transferred back to South Dade Senior High, and the junior high became Redland Middle School, consisting of grades 6–8. The original school, now just an elementary school, suffered severe damage in Hurricane Andrew in 1992 and closed. The school board built a replacement, Redland Elementary School, just to the north.

== Future Use ==
Andrew destroyed the stand-alone auditorium at the top of the structure's U-shape, and the school board sought to demolish the rest of the building. However, the South Florida Pioneer Museum obtained grant money to restore the outside of the structure, fix the roof, and install impact-resistant windows. Although the decaying interior remains untouched, the Miami-Dade County Commission approved $1.8 million in 2018 for interior restoration, which is the first step in a planned project to turn the former school into a combined culinary center, agritourism hub equipped with commercial kitchens for farmers, community event space, and hub for agricultural innovation.
