= Redland, Florida =

Unincorporated community in Florida, United States

- Unincorporated community
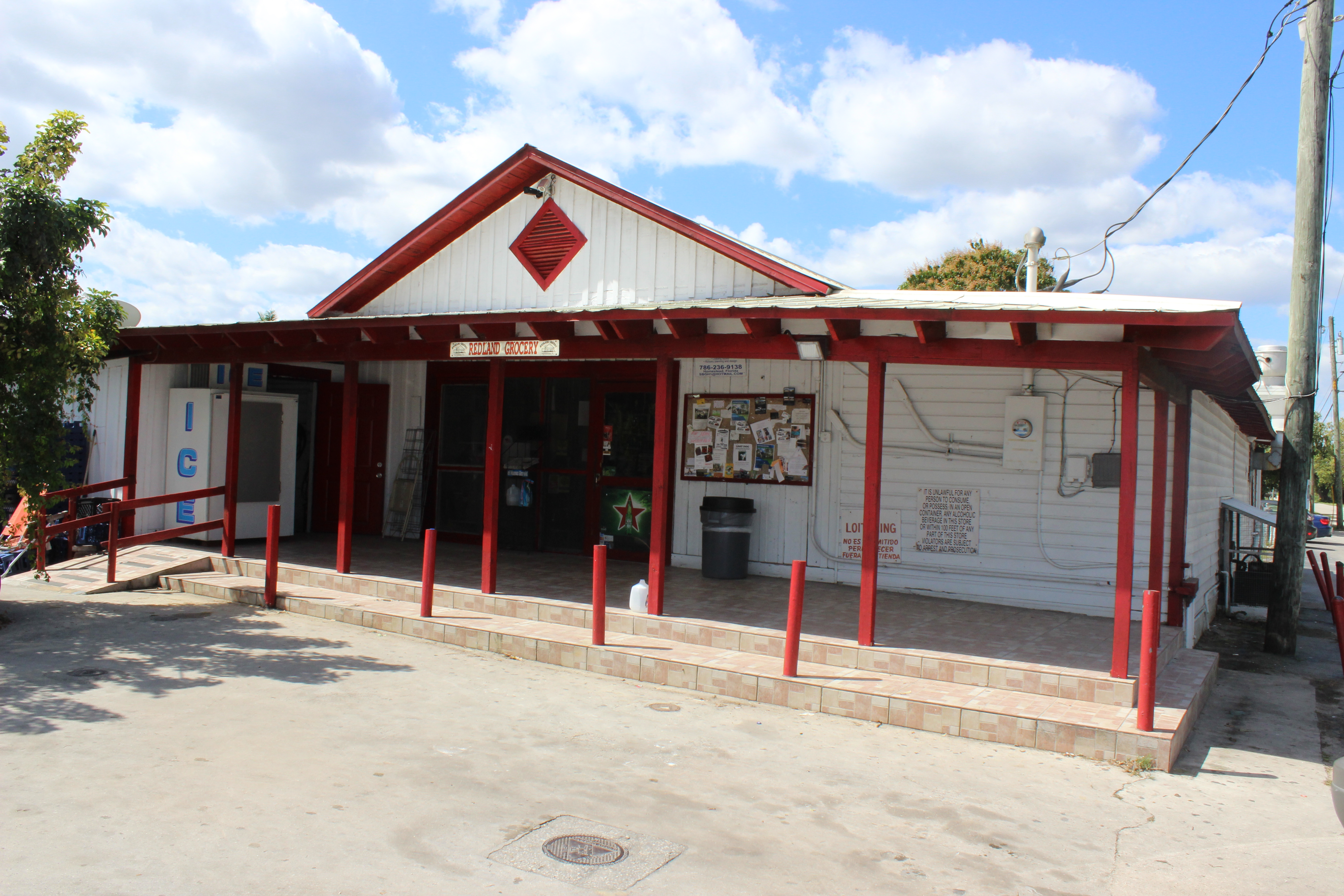
- The 1912 Pioneer Guild Hall in Redland, now the Redland Grocery

- Location within Florida Location within the United States
- Coordinates: 25.5284426°N 80.4903347°W
- Country: United States
- State: Florida
- County: Miami-Dade

Government
  - Governing body: Miami-Dade County
  - Mayor: Daniella Levine Cava
- Elevation: 7 ft (2.1 m)

Population (2010)
  - Total: 10,138
- Time zone: UTC-5 (Eastern (EST))
  - Summer (DST): UTC-4 (EDT)
- ZIP codes: 33030, 33031, 33032, 33034, 33170, 33187
- Area codes: 305, 786
- FIPS code: 12-36100
- GNIS feature ID: 0285050

Redland, long known also as the Redlands or the Redland, is a historic unincorporated community and agricultural area in Miami-Dade County, Florida, located about 20 miles (32 km) southwest of downtown Miami and just northwest of Homestead, Florida. It is unique in that it constitutes a large farming belt directly adjoining what is now the seventh most populous major metropolitan area in the United States. Named for the pockets of red clay that cover a layer of oolitic limestone, Redland produces a variety of tropical fruits, many of which do not grow elsewhere in the continental United States. The area also contains a large concentration of ornamental nurseries. The landscape is dotted with u-pick'em fields, coral rock (oolite) walls, and the original clapboard homes of early settlers and other historic early twentieth century structures.

== Etymology ==
Through the early part of the 20th century, what was known as the "Redland District" – occasionally informally referred to as "the Redlands" or just "the Redland" – encompassed the communities of Homestead, Florida City, Redland, Silver Palm, Modello (now a part of Leisure City), Naranja, Princeton, and Goulds. The "Redland" community included in the Redland District was the area west of S.W. 177th Avenue (Krome Avenue) to the Everglades, south to S.W. 288th Street (Biscayne Drive), and north to S.W. 184th Street (Eureka Drive). The singular "Redland" was purportedly used to make it easier to differentiate the area from the city of Redlands, California.

A smaller-sized community centered around SW 187th Avenue (Redland Road) and SW 264th Street (Bauer Drive) was briefly incorporated as "Redland" in 1910 and then dissolved. Efforts in the 1920s to reincorporate a "town of Redland"—a six-square mile area with proposed borders of SW 280th Street (Waldin Drive) on the south, SW 197th Avenue (Richard Road) on the west, SW 232nd Street (Silver Palm Drive) on the north, and S.W. 177th Avenue (Krome Avenue) on the east—failed when residents could not agree on the precise town limits. Later in the 20th century, people simply began referring informally to the entire agricultural area stretching northwest from (and outside of) the now well-developed Florida City, Homestead, and US 1 corridor as "the Redlands". Today, there is little consistency in usage. While a few residents maintain "the Redlands" is used only by those from outside the area, "Redland," "the Redlands," and "the Redland" are generally used interchangeably, with "Redland" being the more formal usage.

== History ==
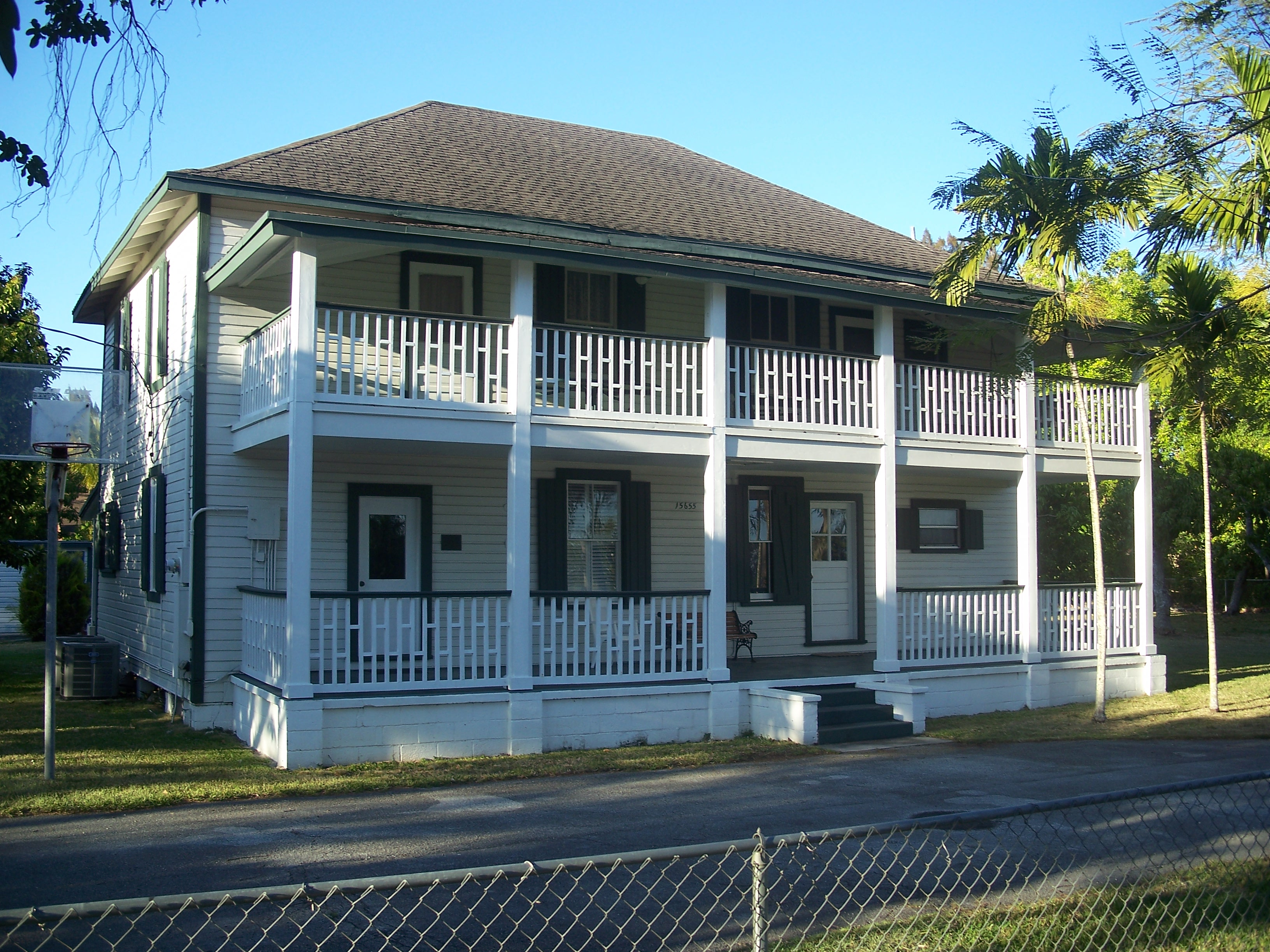
The 1904 Silver Palm Schoolhouse today

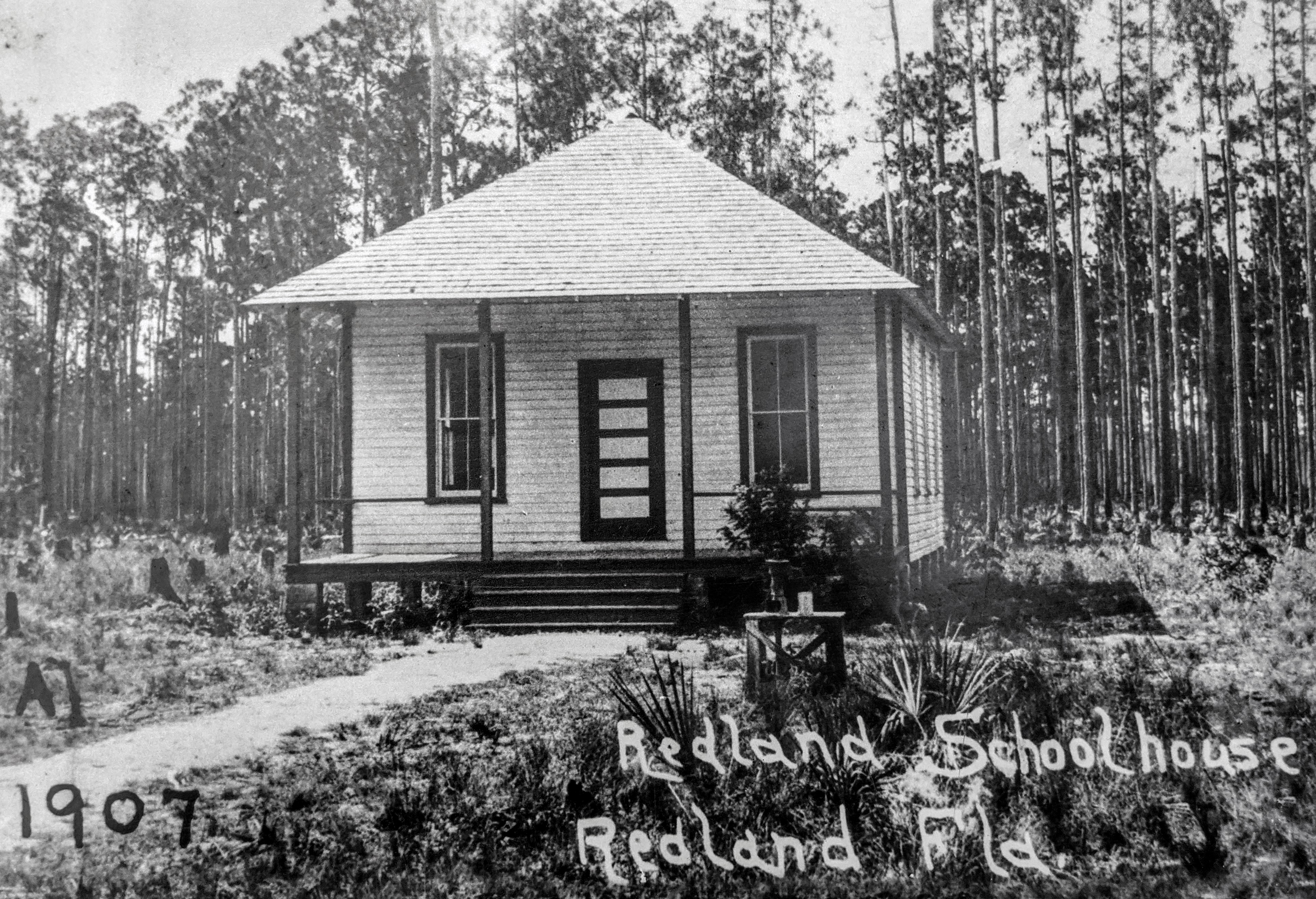
The one-room Redland Schoolhouse in 1907, shortly after construction

=== 1897–1920 ===
In 1897, John Brinsell became the first settler in the redland district, building the first house south of Cutler (now Palmetto Bay) near what is now Silver Palm Drive and SW 157th Avenue (Newton Road). Brinsell was a surveyor that acted as a broker locating pioneer settlers on homestead claims in the area. John Brinsell, dubbed "Lying Johnnie" by fellow pioneers, often exaggerated land praises to lure settlers and sell property. He was never well-liked and eventually got into some trouble then left the area never to be seen or heard from again.

The pioneer homesteaders, living in tents and lean-tos, began clearing and farming their land. Many of the roads that now crisscross Redland bear the names of these pioneers, along with numerical street/avenue designations later assigned by the county. The first harvests were a diverse group of cabbage, carrots, eggplant, beans, and tomatoes. Large-scale farming was impractical, however, because the red, iron-rich soil that gave the area its name could only be found in scattered "potholes" that, at their largest, were only an acre in size. To grow fruit trees, farmers first had to dynamite holes in the oolite rock.

In 1904, residents constructed the Silver Palm Schoolhouse at Silver Palm Drive and Newton Road. The two-story structure was the first and largest of seven rural schoolhouses built in the area in the 1900s. The 1904 arrival of Henry Flagler's Florida East Coast (FEC) Railway several miles to the east in Princeton allowed the homesteaders to easily ship their produce elsewhere in Florida and the country. In 1906, the one-room Redland Schoolhouse was built of Dade County pine at the corner of SW 248th Street (Coconut Palm Drive) and Redland Road. Within five years, five more one-room schoolhouses were built in the area, the last being the Murray Hill Schoolhouse at the corner of Redland Road and SW 216th Street (Hainlin Mill Drive).

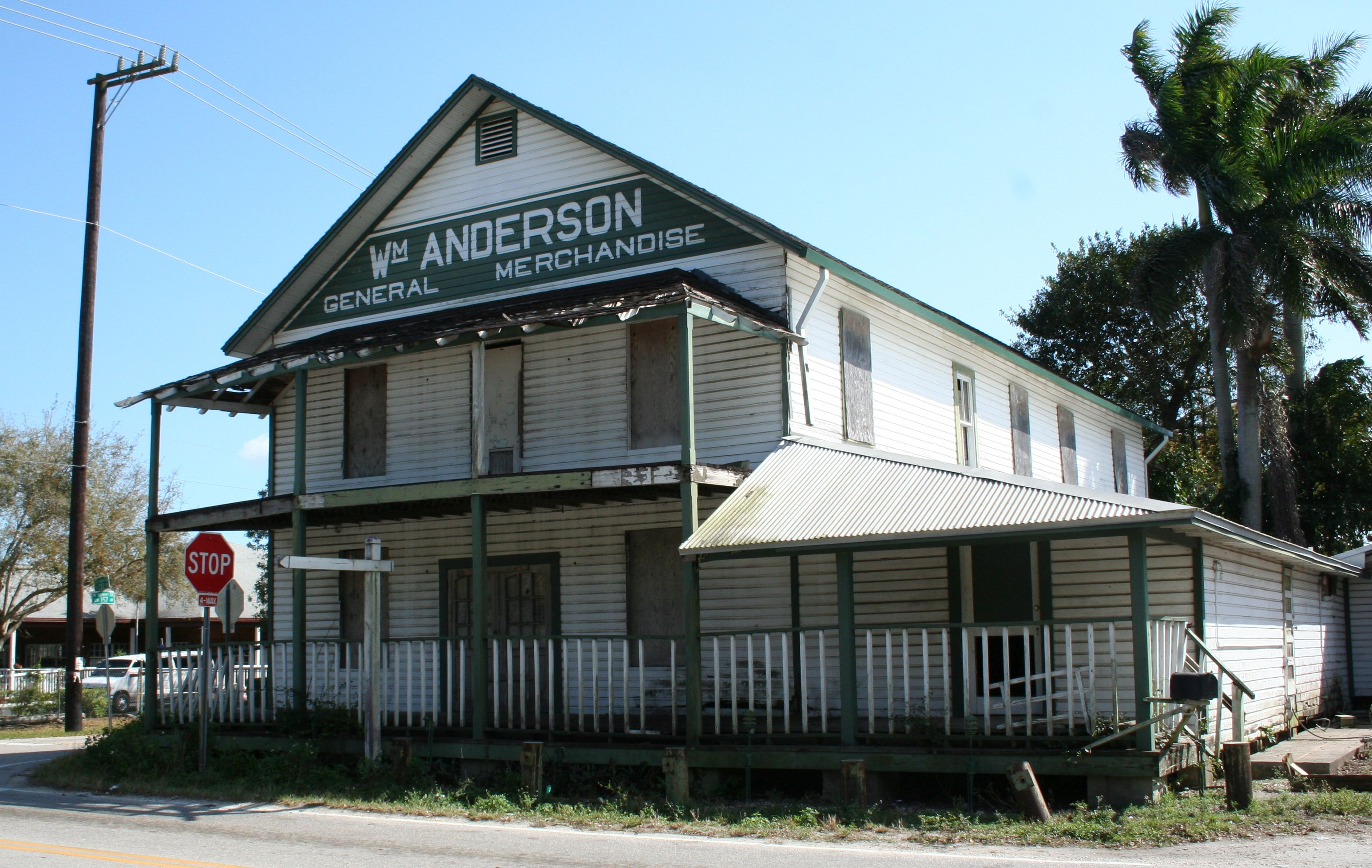
The 1911 William Anderson General Merchandise Store at Anderson's Corner, looking southeast from Silver Palm Drive

In 1911, William "Popp" Anderson, a surveyor from Indiana who worked for the FEC Railway, built the William Anderson General Merchandise Store, also known as Anderson's Corner, a general store catercorner from the Silver Palm Schoolhouse. The store served the thriving community until the 1930s, when it was converted into apartments and, eventually, a restaurant.

In 1912, the Pioneer Guild, a group founded by the women of Redland in 1907 to do good for social, religious, and civic purposes, constructed the Pioneer Guild Hall at the southwest corner of Redland Road and Bauer Drive, adjacent to a newly constructed Episcopal church and a general store called the Redland Grocery Store. The building contained a stage and a dance floor and became the community's social center for dances, dinners, and teas. It also served as a civic center where plans were discussed for better living conditions, and as a cultural center for lectures, art classes, and music classes. Famed orator William Jennings Bryant gave a lecture on the "Origin of Man" at the Guild Hall. Young people were brought in during the summer and taught etiquette as well as art, and the intersection at which the building stood became the de facto center of town.

In 1914, Alvin Lindgren, the son of an early pioneer, had a steam tractor built to his specifications that would lead to a revolution in farming in the area. Using the machining and welding experience he had gained from working for the FEC Railway, Lindgren developed the first tractor capable of scarifying rock land. After clearing the land of trees, grass, and shrubs, the "scarifier" would plow the land in four different directions, pulverizing the oolitic limestone and making it possible to roll the land flat. Although first used mainly for clearing lands and laying out roads – Lindgren is responsible for most of the roads in Redland – farmers soon discovered that they could grow crops in the scarified lands instead of just in the potholes of red soil. Farming on a larger scale had now become feasible, and the farmers of Redland soon started to grow citrus, followed by avocados, mangoes, papayas, and a variety of other tropical fruit.

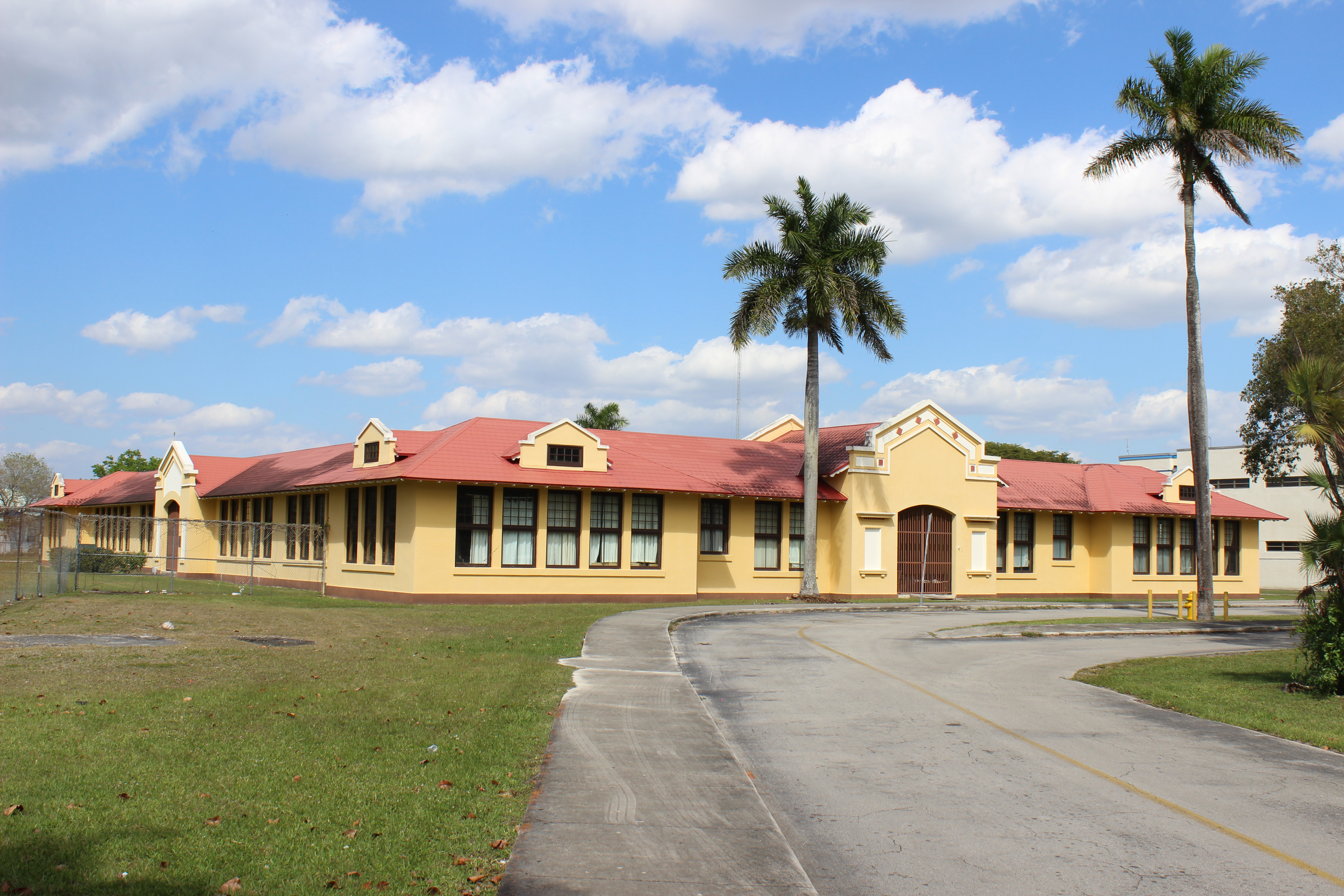
The 1916 Redland Farm Life School, closed since 1992

In 1916, the Redland Farm Life School was constructed on land donated by William Anderson at the northeast corner of Coconut Palm Drive and SW 162nd Avenue (Farm Life School Road). Opening its doors in October 1916 to 195 students, it was the second-largest consolidated school in the country, combining the one-room schools from Redland, Goulds, Eureka, Modello, Princeton, Murray Hill, and Silver Palm into a single modern educational facility with classrooms for grades one through twelve. Area children living in outlying areas were for the first time transported by bus. The school contained indoor bathrooms, electric lighting, drinking fountains, a science laboratory, cloak rooms, a cafeteria, and a stand-alone 3200-square-foot (300 m^{2}) auditorium that seated 300 people.

=== 1920–1945 ===
In 1923, Orchid Jungle, one of South Florida's first roadside tourist attractions, opened on the east side of SW 157th Avenue (Newton Road), south of SW 264th Street (Bauer Drive). It would remain one of the most popular attractions in the area for another 70 years.

In early 1926, The Aladdin Company, a Michigan-based manufacturer of pre-cut homes, began the development of Aladdin City, a planned community with a projected population of 10,000 residents in the northeastern section of Redland, at Hainlin Mill Drive and Farm Life School Road. The developer promised to "spread the Redlands' fame." The Redland District Chamber of Commerce – eager to take advantage of the thousands of dollars of promotional advertising being spent on the development – incorporated the Arabian-themed community as "the ninth community in the famous Redlands." Although a handful of homes and a town hall were built, the development effectively collapsed with the end of the 1920s Florida land boom. Today, all that remains is a small portion of the development's unique street plan and a handful of Arabian-themed street names.

The 1926 Great Miami Hurricane caused tremendous damage throughout Redland. The Pioneer Guild Hall, and the neighboring Episcopal church and general store were hard hit. A new Episcopal church was built closer to neighboring Homestead, leaving the Redland Community United Methodist Church, built in 1913 a mile north, as the only church in Redland. The Guild Hall and general store were restored, but both struggled after the Great Depression. In the early 1940s, Ludolf Andersen and his wife bought the property, and moved the Redland Grocery Store sign to the Guild Hall. The Redland Grocery still operates today in the old Guild Hall, run by the Andersens' son and grandson.

In 1927, the Seaboard Air Line Railway came through the center of Redland, with pioneer resident George W. Kosel donating both a mile of right of way and a station site at SW 256th Street (Plummer Drive). The Seaboard also built a wooden depot at the northwestern edge of the Aladdin City development. Both depots further increased the ability to ship produce out of the area.

In 1933, another famed roadside attraction, Monkey Jungle, opened on Hainlin Mill Drive a mile and a half east of Aladdin City. Known for its tagline, "where the humans are caged and the monkeys run wild,” it remains a major attraction in the area, having survived devastation and temporary closure from hurricanes and allegedly false claims of animal abuse.

On June 29, 1935, the post office at Redland was discontinued.

With the demise of the Guild Hall, the Redland Farm Life School became the focus of virtually all activity in Redland, acting as a de facto community center. Residents gathered at the school for holiday fairs, elections, dances, and agricultural meetings. The property also served as a playground for neighborhood children.

=== 1980–2000 ===
As land became more expensive beginning in the 1980s and the North American Free Trade Agreement began to affect the bottom line of some farmers, the ornamental nursery industry developed due to providing a better financial return on the land. Nevertheless, by 1990, the area was the country's largest producer of tomatoes in the winter, and provided 95 percent of the limes to the whole country.

Hurricanes such as the 1926 Great Miami hurricane, the 1929 Bahamas hurricane, the 1935 Labor Day hurricane, and Hurricane Betsy in 1960 all caused severe damage to crops, ornamental nurseries, and structures. However, it was Hurricane Andrew in 1992 that proved particularly devastating. Among other things, it destroyed Orchid Jungle (now the Hattie Bauer Hammock Preserve), the 1906 Redland Schoolhouse, the 1913 Redland Community United Methodist Church, and the wooden train station in the Aladdin City section, and forced the permanent closure of the Redland Farm Life School and Anderson's Corner and the restaurant that had been operating on the premises. Farm losses exceeded $41 billion.

In 1995, Redland became the subject of national media attention when nine-year-old Jimmy Ryce disappeared after the school bus dropped him off at the southeast corner of Silver Palm Drive and Farm Life Road (later renamed Farm Life School Road, but at the time of the abduction Farm Life Road), a block from his home. Three months after the disappearance, Juan Carlos Chavez, who had been living in a trailer on a neighbor's property, confessed to abducting, raping, and murdering Ryce, and then dismembering his body and interring the remains in planters sealed with concrete. The crime led to the passage of the Jimmy Ryce Act, which prescribes conditions for the involuntary civil commitment of sex offenders upon release from prison. Juan Carlos Chavez was executed by the state of Florida in 2014. The site where Jimmy Ryce was dropped off by the school bus remains a memorial site in Redland to this day.

The area has many historic markers that tell the history of certain spots.

== Geography ==
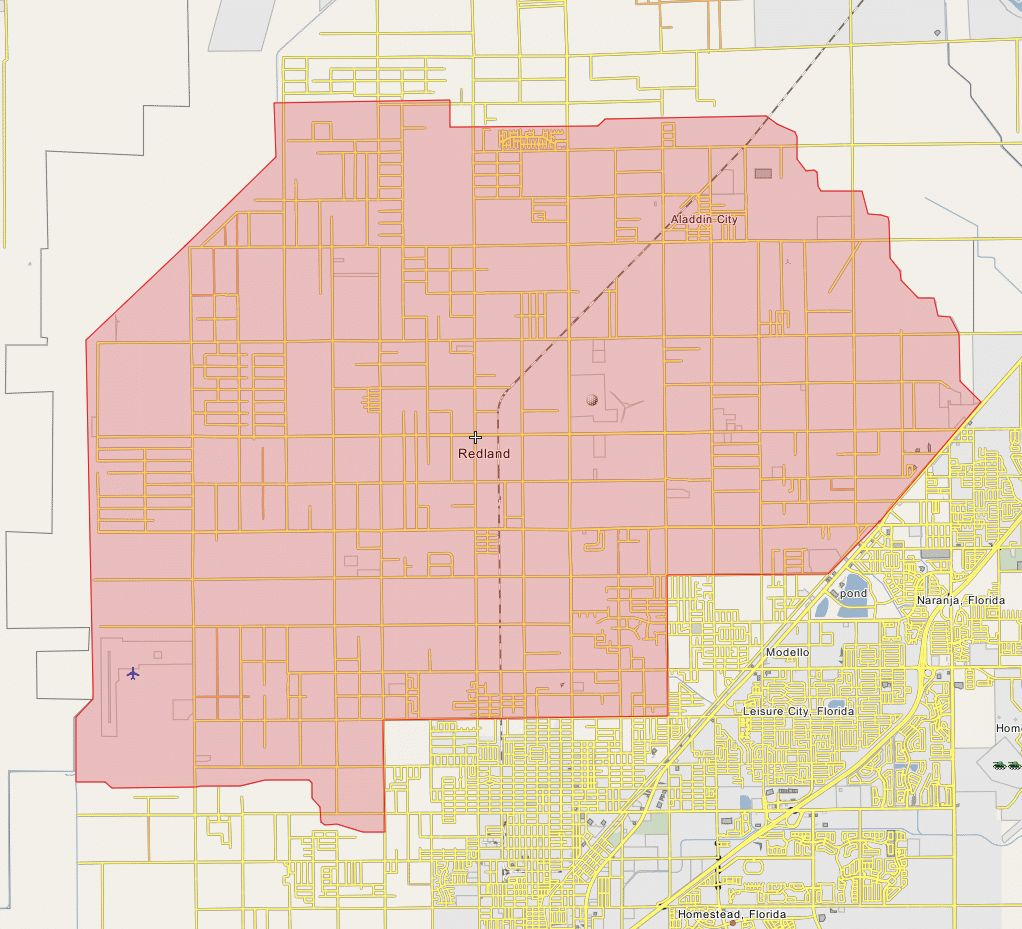
Map showing one version of Redland's boundaries

The geographical center of Redland is 25.5284426°N 80.4903347°W (coincidentally, the site of the long since demolished Seaboard rail depot), and its elevation 7 feet (2.1 m). Historically, Redland was the area bordered by Krome Avenue on the east, Biscayne Drive on the south, the Everglades on the west, and Eureka Drive on the north. As is the case with the correct name for the area, the location of its boundaries today depends on whom one asks. Redland is considered by many to be a larger area of roughly 50 square miles (130 km^{2}), generally bounded on the north by the C-102 (Princeton) canal; on the west by the C-111 canal; on the south by the C-113 canal to SW 197th Avenue, SW 296th Street to SW 167th Avenue, and SW 272nd Street to U.S 1; and on the east by SW 197th Avenue to SW 296th Street, SW 167th Avenue to SW 272nd Street, and U.S. 1 to the Princeton Canal. Many others consider Redland to be an even larger area of 68 square miles (180 km^{2}) extending as far north as S.W. 168th Street west of Richmond West, and as far south as S.W. 360th Street in the area west of Homestead and Florida City.

== Economy ==
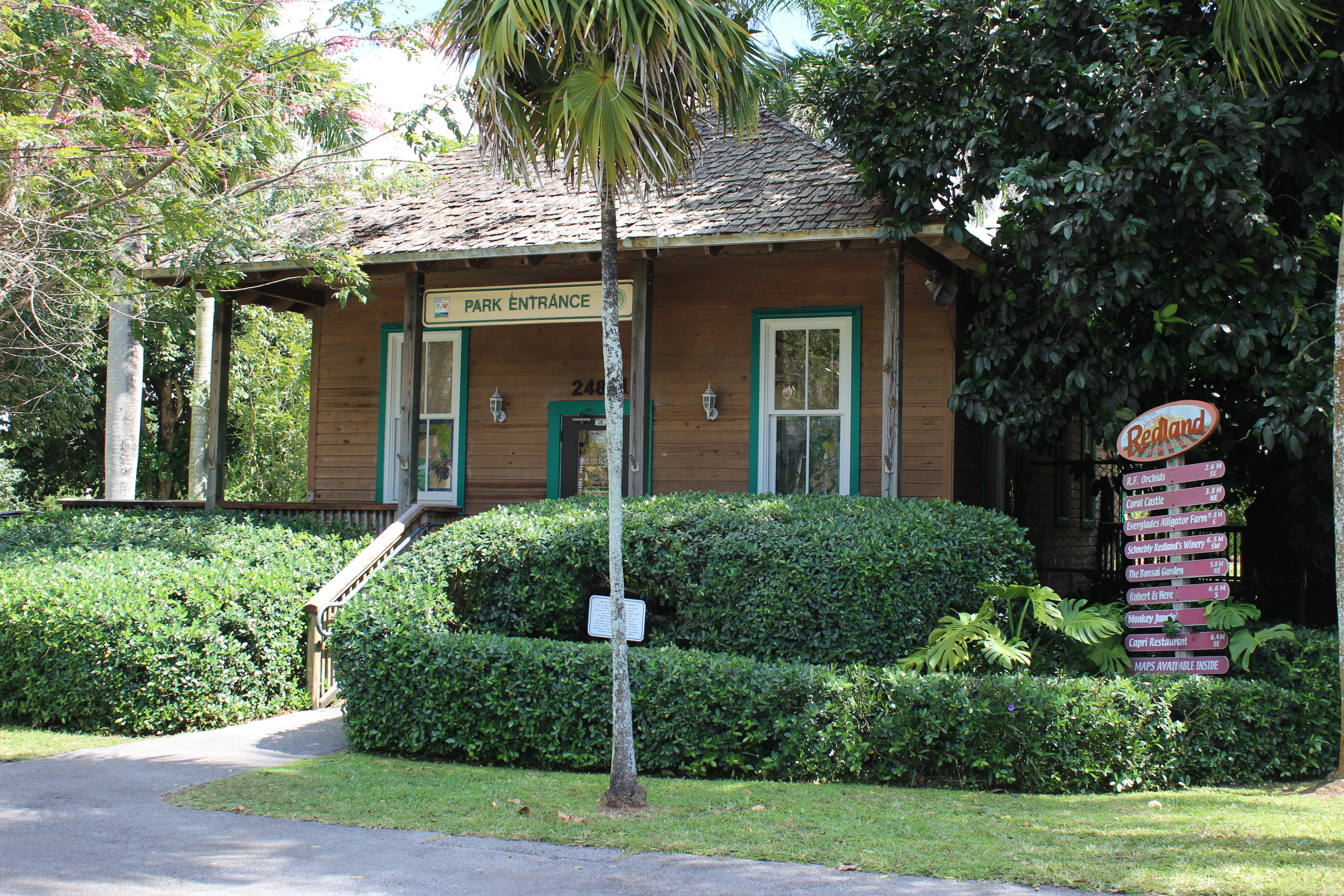
Post-Andrew replica of the 1906 one-room Redland Schoolhouse used as the entrance to the Fruit & Spice Park

With its tropical climate, many tropical fruit crops are grown in Redland that are not grown commercially elsewhere in the continental United States, such as mango, avocado, guava, passion fruit, carambola (star fruit), lychee, jack fruit, canistel, sapodilla, longan, mamey sapote, black sapote (chocolate pudding fruit), miracle fruit, jaboticaba, cecropia (snake fingers), and coffee beans. Avocados constitute the largest commercial crop, covering nearly 8,000 acres (3,237 hectares). Today's farmers include Cuban- and Asian-Americans, as well as weekend dabblers and members of the farm-to-table movement.

The Fruit & Spice Park, a 37-acre (15-hectare) county-run park and local attraction, offers samples of virtually all of the tropical fruits grown here and more, including 150 varieties of mango and 70 types of bananas. The original one-room Redland Schoolhouse built in 1906 was used as the entrance to the park until it was destroyed by Hurricane Andrew; a faithful replica was built in its place. Like the Pioneer Guild Hall and Redland Farm Life School before it, the park frequently serves as a community center, hosting festivals, events, and community meetings.

Redland also contains a large number of ornamental nurseries that produce orchids and other ornamental plants. The Redland International Orchid Festival, which is the largest annual orchid show in the United States, is hosted at the Fruit & Spice Park each May.

Although there are some older one acre to 2 1/2 acre ranchettes, virtually all of Redland is outside of the urban development boundary (UDB) created by Miami-Dade County in the 1980s, and the resulting agricultural/residential zoning requires houses built in the area to be on a minimum of 5 acres (20,000 m^{2}) of land. Farmers with large land holdings, aligned with developers, have sought to expand the UDB boundaries, arguing that restricting future development could drive down the price of land value. However, smaller farmers with five-acre lots, who outnumber farmers with larger operations, have thus far successfully fought to keep Redland outside of the UDB and zoned for agriculture. Both in the early 2000s and in the early 2010s, residents, like their forebears in the early part of the 20th century, explored incorporation, only this time to ward off any movement of the UDB and to avoid piecemeal annexation by Homestead and Florida City.

Despite zoning protection, Redland's historic and rural character has faded as original homes, lacking historic preservation protection, have been knocked down, and as the community succumbs to the insistent pressure of the surrounding urban area. In 2016, the historic 1905 pine clapboard Kosel homestead on the northwest corner of Plummer Drive and Redland Road was demolished, as was the 1926 Howard Schaff residence on the west side of Krome Avenue south of S.W. 272nd Street (Epmore Drive). Like many historic structures in Redland, both had been eligible for listing in the National Register of Historic Places (NRHP). To date, however, only two structures in Redland—the William Anderson General Merchandise Store and the Silver Palm Schoolhouse—have been listed in the NRHP. In addition, in January 2019, the Florida Department of Transportation began what is now almost-completed construction on its project to widen Krome Avenue through Redland to four lanes. The project has already forced the closure of one feed store in Redland, threatens the closure of another feed and supply store, and promises other dramatic impacts on the community's rural character.

== Education ==
=== Public schools ===
Miami-Dade County Public Schools operates the public schools in Redland. In 1953, grades 9-12 and the agricultural curriculum moved from the Redland Farm Life School to the newly constructed South Dade High School three miles to the south. In 1958, Redland Junior High School opened in newer construction just to the east of the Redland Farm Life School, and the ninth grade returned from what was now South Dade Senior High. In 1983, the ninth grade was transferred back to South Dade, and the junior high became Redland Middle School, consisting of grades 6-8. The original Redland Farm Life School, now just an elementary school, suffered severe damage in Hurricane Andrew in 1992 and closed. Although the building still remains standing, the school board built a replacement, Redland Elementary School, just to the north.

=== High schools ===
- South Dade High School

=== Middle schools ===
- Redland Middle School
- South Dade Middle School

=== Elementary schools ===
- Redland Elementary School
- Avocado Elementary School

=== Private schools ===
- Redland Christian Academy (PK-12)
- Colonial Christian School (PK-12)

== Points of interest ==
- Fruit & Spice Park
- Monastery of the Most Holy Trinity, a community of Discalced Carmelite nuns founded from the convent of Queretaro in Mexico.
- Monkey Jungle
- Redland Farm Life School
- Silver Palm Schoolhouse
- William Anderson General Merchandise Store
