= Florida City, Florida =

Florida City
- City
- City of Florida City
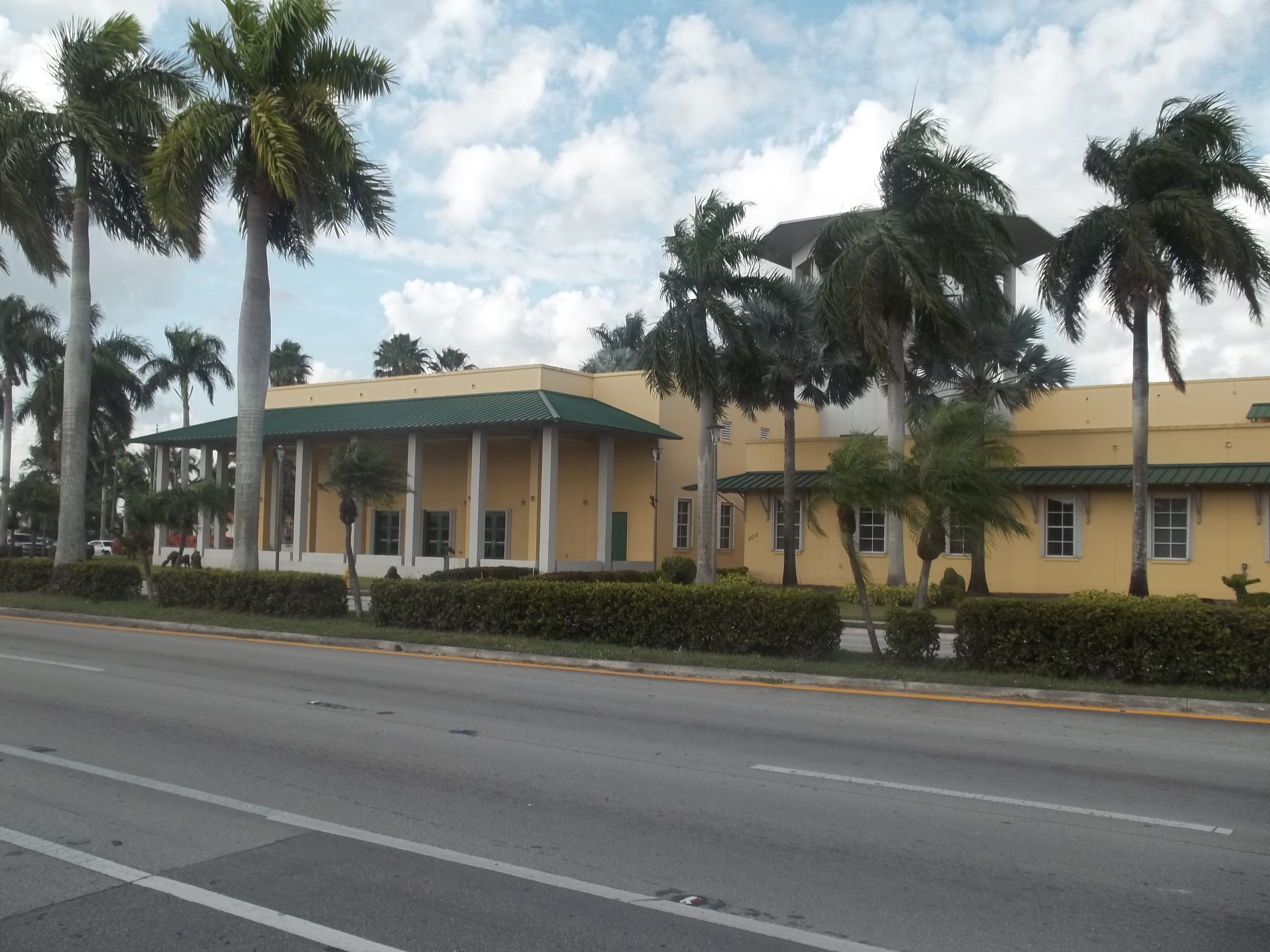
- City hall
- Motto(s): Gateway to the Florida Keys and the Everglades
- Location in Miami-Dade County and the state of Florida

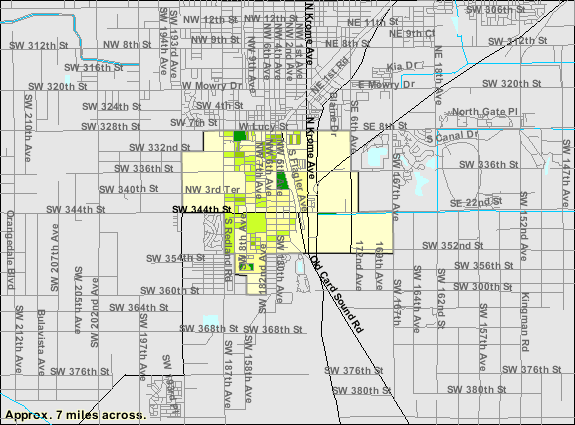
- U.S. Census Bureau map showing city limits

- Location in the United States
- Coordinates: 25°26′52″N 80°29′04″W
- Country: United States
- State: Florida
- County: Miami-Dade
- Incorporated: December 29, 1914

Government
  - Type: Mayor-Council

Area
  - Total: 6.06 sq mi (15.69 km^{2})
  - Land: 5.99 sq mi (15.51 km^{2})
  - Water: 0.069 sq mi (0.18 km^{2})
- Elevation: 0 ft (0 m)

Population (2020)
  - Total: 13,085
  - Density: 2,184.6/sq mi (843.49/km^{2})
- Time zone: UTC-05:00 (EST)
  - Summer (DST): UTC-04:00 (EDT)
- ZIP codes: 33034, 33035
- Area codes: 305, 786, 645
- FIPS code: 12-22975
- GNIS feature ID: 2403622
- Website: www.floridacityfl.gov

Florida City is a city in Miami-Dade County, Florida, United States. It is the southernmost municipality in the South Florida metropolitan area. Florida City is primarily a Miami suburb and a major agricultural area. As of the 2020 census, it had a population of 13,085, up from 11,245 in 2010.

The city lies to the south and west of, and is contiguous with, Homestead. Both cities suffered catastrophic damage in August 1992 when Hurricane Andrew struck South Florida.

The city originated as a land promotion named "Detroit". There were no buildings in the area when the first thirty families arrived in 1910, and they had to stay in Homestead until their houses could be built. The name was changed to "Florida City" when the town incorporated in 1914. It has a small historic area, but much of the city is hotels and other tourist facilities.

The city is at the eastern end of the only road running through the Everglades National Park, which terminates at Flamingo. Florida City is the southernmost city in the United States which is not on an island. It is also the last stop on the mainland north of the Florida Keys. The southern terminus of the Homestead Extension of Florida's Turnpike where it ends at its junction with U.S. 1 is located in Florida City. Homestead is immediately north and east of Florida City, and these two cities comprise the greater Homestead-Florida City area. Some of the notable unincorporated communities in the area are Redland, Leisure City, Naranja, and Princeton.

== Physiography and natural history ==
Florida City is situated mostly atop a limestone ridge called the Miami Rock Ridge that extends south from present day North Miami Beach to a location in Everglades National Park. The ridge, consisting of Miami Limestone, serves as the higher ground within the community. The ridge extended from northeast to southwest across the city. The old location of the Florida East Coast Railway track marks the approximate boundary of the location of the limestone ridge south of Davis Parkway. The range of elevation of the ridge is from 5 to 8 feet (1.5–2.4 meters) above sea level.

Before settlement, the ridge was vegetated by South Florida slash pine trees, which were alternatively known as Dade County Pine (Pinus elliottii var. densa). (Remnants of these pines can be seen today in local parks and in Everglades National Park at the Long Pine Key picnic area.) These pine rocklands were crushed by equipment and converted to farmland during the 1900s. Tomatoes, squash, and other truck crops were grown in the area during the winter months and packed at the Florida City State Farmers' Market near Krome Avenue and Palm Drive, driving the local economy throughout the 1900s.

East of the natural ridge was a broad area of marshlands surrounding the area. Old timers of Florida City called these coastal glades the "East Glade". This was an extension of Everglades that extended from areas west and south of Florida City to its east. East of the East Glade, marshlands gave way to mangrove swamp prior to reaching Biscayne Bay. Soils in the East Glade primarily consisted of a limey soil called Biscayne Marl.

Development schemes in the East Glade led to the construction of canals in the early 1900s. This led to a lowering of water tables. Although development the East Glade was not extensive prior to the 1980s, agricultural development did occur. Potatoes were the primary crop grown in the East Glade before the construction of extensive housing developments within the areas annexed by the City of Homestead in the late 1970s. Potatoes mostly were harvested from February to March.

Florida City was historically bisected by a slough. Sloughs commonly were found crossing the limestone ridge at a roughly perpendicular angle from Miami to Florida City. Florida City's slough (officially called "Long Slough" or "Long Glade Slough") entered the city near Redland Road and Lucy Street, and extended across the city to the southeast to a location near today's NW 3rd Street and NW 3rd Avenue. East of this point, the slough entered the East Glade.

Long Slough was a slow flowing body of water that originated in the Everglades just south of the Miami Homestead General Aviation Airport. As canals were constructed in the 1900s, and especially the 1960s, the slough was drained and became a low valley in the limestone ridge. Roadways (such as Redland Road near West Homestead Elementary School, NW 6th Avenue north of Davis Parkway, and NW 3rd Avenue about fifty feet north of NW 3rd Street) had culverts constructed under them to allow water to pass through the slough. NW 4th Street east of NW 5th Avenue dead ended near the approximate location where a fictional NW 4th Avenue would intersect that street. During the late 1980s, the street was constructed to reach NW 3rd Avenue since water in the slough had been drained away. Eventually fill was added to the slough and it was destroyed.

Extensive filling operations were conducted in Long Slough near NW 3rd Avenue in the late 1970s. Fill was obtained as waste rock from a nearby rock cutting operation (utilizing Key Largo Limestone, a local coral rock) and was allowed to be dumped in the location by the landowners. Today, this portion of Long Slough serves as a housing development.

A live oak hammock existed along Davis Parkway, extending into the Florida City Camper Park. The understory of the hammock was cleared for the camper park, but much of the hammock remained undisturbed to the south of Davis Parkway and NW 1st Road before the late 1970s.

Florida City today serves as the southern terminus of the Homestead Extension of Florida's Turnpike. Motels and eateries are located along US 1 before taking the highway south into the Florida Keys. Along with serving as the mainland entrance to the Florida Keys, Florida City also serves as the gateway to the main section of Everglades National Park.

== Geography ==
According to the United States Census Bureau, the city has a total area of 6.1 square miles (16 km^{2}), of which 0.07 square miles (0.18 km^{2}) or 1.14%, are water.

=== Climate ===
The Köppen Climate Classification sub-type for this climate is "Aw". (Tropical Savanna Climate) with long, hot summers and short, warm winters.

Climate data for Florida City
| Month | Jan | Feb | Mar | Apr | May | Jun | Jul | Aug | Sep | Oct | Nov | Dec | Year |
|---|---|---|---|---|---|---|---|---|---|---|---|---|---|
| Mean daily maximum °F (°C) | 78 (26) | 80 (27) | 82 (28) | 85 (29) | 88 (31) | 90 (32) | 91 (33) | 92 (33) | 90 (32) | 87 (31) | 83 (28) | 79 (26) | 85 (29) |
| Mean daily minimum °F (°C) | 54 (12) | 56 (13) | 58 (14) | 61 (16) | 66 (19) | 71 (22) | 73 (23) | 73 (23) | 73 (23) | 69 (21) | 63 (17) | 57 (14) | 65 (18) |
| Average precipitation inches (mm) | 1.6 (41) | 1.8 (46) | 2 (51) | 2.7 (69) | 5.9 (150) | 9.1 (230) | 7 (180) | 8.1 (210) | 8.7 (220) | 5.5 (140) | 2.3 (58) | 1.4 (36) | 56.1 (1,420) |
Source: Weatherbase

== Demographics ==
Historical population
| Census | Pop. | Note | %± |
|---|---|---|---|
| 1920 | 355 | | — |
| 1930 | 452 | | 27.3% |
| 1940 | 752 | | 66.4% |
| 1950 | 1,547 | | 105.7% |
| 1960 | 4,114 | | 165.9% |
| 1970 | 5,133 | | 24.8% |
| 1980 | 6,174 | | 20.3% |
| 1990 | 5,806 | | −6.0% |
| 2000 | 7,843 | | 35.1% |
| 2010 | 11,245 | | 43.4% |
| 2020 | 13,085 | | 16.4% |
| 2022 (est.) | 12,644 | ▼ | −3.4% |
U.S. Decennial Census

=== Racial and ethnic composition ===
Florida City, Florida – Racial and ethnic composition Note: the US Census treats Hispanic/Latino as an ethnic category. This table excludes Latinos from the racial categories and assigns them to a separate category. Hispanics/Latinos may be of any race.
| Race / Ethnicity (NH = Non-Hispanic) | Pop 2000 | Pop 2010 | Pop 2020 | % 2000 | % 2010 | % 2020 |
|---|---|---|---|---|---|---|
| White alone (NH) | 549 | 625 | 498 | 7.00% | 5.56% | 3.81% |
| Black or African American alone (NH) | 4,374 | 5,674 | 5,786 | 55.77% | 50.46% | 44.22% |
| Native American or Alaska Native alone (NH) | 5 | 6 | 13 | 0.06% | 0.05% | 0.10% |
| Asian alone (NH) | 45 | 36 | 24 | 0.57% | 0.32% | 0.18% |
| Native Hawaiian or Pacific Islander alone (NH) | 0 | 4 | 3 | 0.00% | 0.04% | 0.02% |
| Other race alone (NH) | 18 | 24 | 56 | 0.23% | 0.21% | 0.43% |
| Mixed race or Multiracial (NH) | 333 | 113 | 182 | 4.25% | 1.00% | 1.39% |
| Hispanic or Latino (any race) | 2,519 | 4,763 | 6,523 | 32.12% | 42.36% | 49.85% |
| Total | 7,843 | 11,245 | 13,085 | 100.00% | 100.00% | 100.00% |

=== 2020 census ===
As of the 2020 census, Florida City had a population of 13,085. The median age was 30.3 years. 31.8% of residents were under the age of 18 and 10.6% were 65 years of age or older. For every 100 females, there were 91.6 males, and for every 100 females age 18 and over, there were 85.5 males age 18 and over.

100.0% of residents lived in urban areas, while 0.0% lived in rural areas.

There were 3,905 households in Florida City, of which 50.6% had children under the age of 18 living in them. Of all households, 31.2% were married-couple households, 18.9% were households with a male householder and no spouse or partner present, and 40.3% were households with a female householder and no spouse or partner present. About 19.9% of all households were made up of individuals, and 9.6% had someone living alone who was 65 years of age or older.

There were 4,088 housing units, of which 4.5% were vacant. The homeowner vacancy rate was 1.7% and the rental vacancy rate was 3.9%.

The city had 2,247 families.

=== 2010 census ===
As of the 2010 United States census, there were 11,245 people, 2,883 households, and 2,216 families residing in the city.

Based on 2010 data, the ancestries of only the Hispanic and Latino population from highest to lowest were as follows: Mexicans made up the 42.52%, Cubans were at 19.13%, Central Americans accounted for 13.37%, Puerto Ricans totaled 12.87%, and South Americans were 3.74% of all residents.

=== 2000 census ===
In 2000, 46.5% had children under the age of 18 living with them, 35.6% were married couples living together, 34.0% had a female householder with no husband present, and 23.1% were non-families. 18.1% of all households were made up of individuals, and 6.7% had someone living alone who was 65 years of age or older. The average household size was 3.48 and the average family size was 3.95.

In 2000, the city population was spread out, with 39.7% under the age of 18, 11.0% from 18 to 24, 26.3% from 25 to 44, 15.8% from 45 to 64, and 7.2% who were 65 years of age or older. The median age was 24 years. For every 100 females, there were 94.7 males. For every 100 females age 18 and over, there were 89.7 males.

In 2000, the median income for a household in the city was $14,923, and the median income for a family was $18,777. Males had a median income of $23,622 versus $20,060 for females. The per capita income for the city was $8,270. 43.3% of the population and 41.7% of families were below the poverty line. 57.1% of those under the age of 18 and 25.6% of those 65 and older were living below the poverty line.

As of 2000, English was spoken as a first language by 65.64% of the population, Spanish speakers made up 28.33% of all residents, and French Creole was spoken by 6.03% of the populace.

=== Crime ===
As of 2020, Florida City was rated as the number one "most dangerous" city in the state of Florida. Within a population of 11,826, it had a violent crime rate of 2,908.8 per 100,000. The poverty rate of the city was listed at 14%.

== Government and infrastructure ==
The Florida Department of Corrections operates the Dade Correctional Institution and the Homestead Correctional Institution in an unincorporated area near Florida City. The Dade CI was originally the Dade Correctional Institution Annex, and the Homestead CI was originally the Dade Correctional Institution; the two received their current names on July 1, 2003.

The United States Postal Service operates the Florida City Post Office.

== Education ==
Florida City is a part of the Miami-Dade County Public Schools system.

Florida City is zoned to:

- Florida City Elementary School (Florida City)
- Homestead Middle School (Homestead)
- Homestead High School (Homestead)

In addition Rise Academy-South Dade Charter School is in the area.

Florida City also has the following Charter Schools:

- Lawrence Academy Charter
- Lincoln Marti International Campus
- Miami Community Charter

== Notable people ==
- James Burgess, American football player
- Glenn Simmons, outdoorsman and guide
- Rashad Smith, American football player
- Sean Taylor, American Football Player
