= Naranja-Princeton, Florida =

Naranja-Princeton
- Former CDP
- Location within the state of Florida
- Coordinates: 25°31′31″N 80°24′44″W
- Country: United States
- State: Florida
- County: Dade

Area
  - Land: 9.2 sq mi (23.8 km^{2})

Population (1980)
  - Total: 10,381
  - Density: 1,130/sq mi (436/km^{2})
- Time zone: UTC-5 (Eastern (EST))
  - Summer (DST): UTC-4 (EDT)
- ZIP codes: 33032, 33033, 33092
- Area code: 305
- FIPS code: 12-47712

Naranja-Princeton was a census-designated place in Miami-Dade County, Florida during the 1980 United States Census, which consists of the communities of Naranja and Princeton. The population in 1980 was 10,381. The census area split to form Naranja and Princeton CDPs in 1990, when the population recorded were 5,790 and 7,073 respectively.

== Geography ==
The census area of Naranja-Princeton was located at approximately 25.525241 north, 80.412230 west. The census area was located south of Goulds and north of Leisure City. The CDP had a land area of 9.2 square miles (23.8 square kilometers) and consisted of 26.2% black and 19.0% Latino residents.
