= South Dade Senior High School =

Location
- 28401 SW 167th Avenue; Homestead, Florida 33030; United States; 25°30′05″N 80°27′35″W

Information
- Type: Public magnet (As of 2008-09)
- Motto: There is no peer to a Buccaneer!(Formerly "The Rebels")
- Established: Original campus: August 1953; 73 years ago; New campus: April 2008; 18 years ago
- School district: Miami-Dade County Public Schools
- Principal: Jonathan Britton
- Teaching staff: 127.00 (FTE) (2023–2024)
- Grades: 9–12
- Enrollment: 3,382 (2023–2024)
- Student to teacher ratio: 25.62 (2023–2024)
- Campus: Suburban
- Colors: Royal Blue, White and Black
- Mascot: Buccaneer
- Average class size: 28
- Website: sdshs.net

South Dade Senior High School is a secondary school in unincorporated Miami-Dade County, Florida, just north of Homestead. It is located on 60 acres (240,000 m^{2}) at the southernmost end of Miami-Dade County.

It is the older of the two public high schools that serves the population of parts of the city of Homestead, Redland, Naranja, Leisure City, and other unincorporated areas.

South Dade is currently structured as a magnet school with International Baccalaureate and five other Academic programs that draw students from throughout the region.

== History ==
South Dade was established in 1953, consolidating the original Homestead High School with the agricultural program and grades 9-12 of the Redland Farm Life School. Following the devastation of Hurricane Andrew in August 1992, the school building was repaired and a new science wing opened in 1995. In 2008, a state of the art facility with over 420,000 square feet opened.

== School journalism ==
- The Current - school newspaper
- Southernaire - school yearbook
- BUCTV - school TV production

== Magnet academies ==
Academy of Professional Services

- Agritechnology & Business Systems
- Landscape Design Architecture
- Sports & Recreational Turf Management
- Automotive Service Technology
- Materials & Processing Technology

Academy of International Finance, Business & Technology

- Information Technology
- Web Design Services
- Accounting Operations
- Business Supervise & Management
- Electronic Business Enterprise

Academy of Sports, Nutrition & Health Science

- Sports Administration
- Sports Medicine
- Nursing Assisting
- Childcare
- Culinary Arts
- Medical Assisting

Academy of Visual & Performing Arts

- Symphonic Band
- Wind Ensemble
- Chorus
- Orchestra
- Dance
- Theatre Arts
- Visual Arts

Academy of Law Studies & Public Safety

- Criminal Justice & Legal Services
- Law Enforcement & Custom Operations
- JROTC
- Firefighter

Academy of International Baccalaureate (IB)

- French
- Italian
- Spanish

== Athletics ==
Its athletic rival is Homestead High School.

- Baseball
- Basketball (boys and girls)
- Bowling
- Cheerleading
- Cross Country
- Football
- Golf
- Soccer (boys and girls)
- Softball
- Swimming (boys and girls)
- Track (boys and girls)
- Volleyball
- Wrestling (boys and girls)

=== Wrestling ===
- State champions (1995, 1996, 1997, 1999, 2000, 2001, 2003, 2008, 2013, 2014, 2015, 2016, 2017, 2018, 2019, 2020, 2021, 2022, 2023, 2024, 2025, 2026)

=== Bowling ===
- State champions (2003) - girls

=== Football ===
- State champions (2013)

=== Baseball ===
- State champions (2014)

== South Dade HS feeder pattern ==
- Avocado Elementary School
- Neva King Cooper Educational Center
- Redland Elementary School
- Redondo Elementary School
- West Homestead Elementary School
- William A. Chapman Elementary School
- Homestead Middle School
- Redland Middle School
- South Dade Middle School
- South Dade Senior High School
- South Dade Adult Center
- South Dade Skill Center

== Notable alumni ==
- Marcus Hudson, football player for the San Francisco 49ers
- Jeremiah Jean-Baptiste, football player for the Los Angeles Chargers
- Alek Manoah, baseball player for the Toronto Blue Jays, 2019 MLB draft #11 overall selection
- Jose 'Tony' Parrilla, three-time NCAA 800m champion University of Tennessee (1992-1994), 1992 and 1996 Olympian
- Victoria Principal, actress notable for her role as Pamela Barnes Ewing on the TV show Dallas
- Kerry Reed, football player for the BC Lions
- Antrel Rolle, football player for the New York Giants
- James Wiggins, football player for the Arizona Cardinals.
