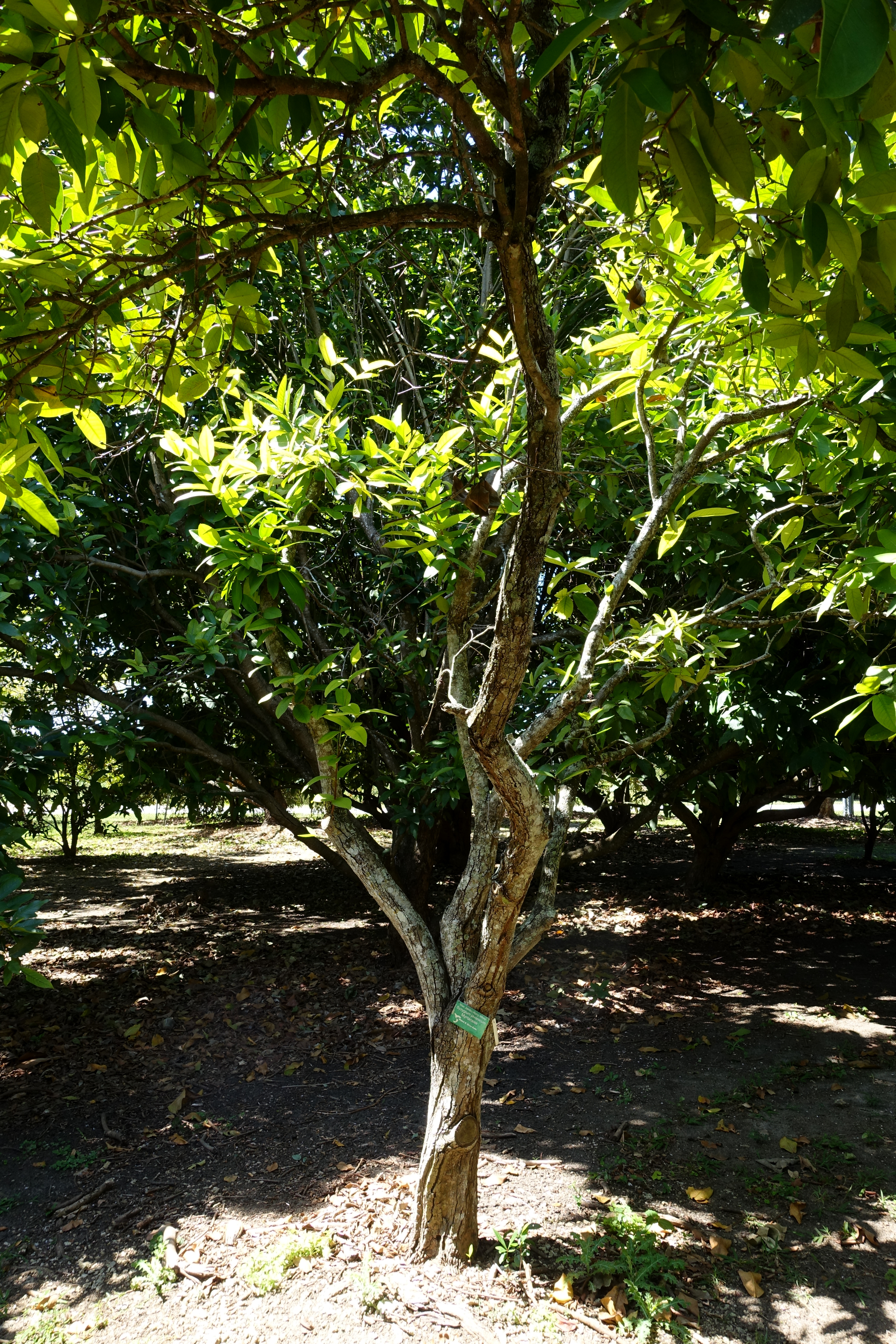
- At the Fruit & Spice Park in Redland, Florida
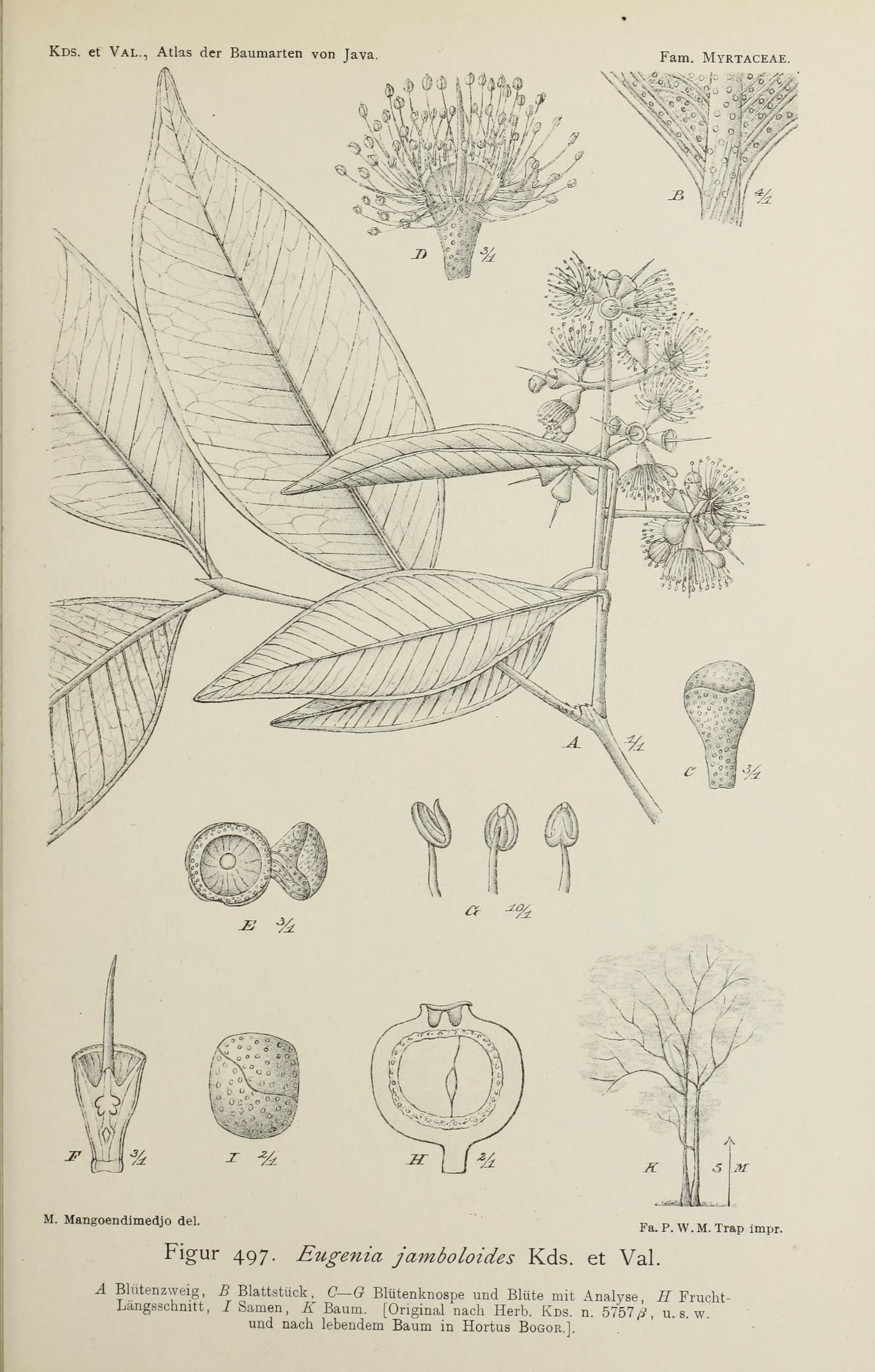
- Botanical illustration

Conservation status
- Least Concern (IUCN 3.1)

Scientific classification
- Kingdom: Plantae
- Clade: Tracheophytes
- Clade: Angiosperms
- Clade: Eudicots
- Clade: Rosids
- Order: Myrtales
- Family: Myrtaceae
- Genus: Syzygium
- Species: S. racemosum

Binomial name
- Syzygium racemosum (Blume) DC.

Synonyms
- List: Calyptranthes racemosa Blume; Eugenia brunneoramea Merr.; Eugenia euneura (Miq.) Craib; Eugenia evansii Ridl.; Eugenia expansa Duthie; Eugenia jamboloides Koord. & Valeton; Eugenia robinsoniana Ridl.; Eugenia zippeliana (Miq.) Koord. & Valeton; Syzygium angkolanum Miq.; Syzygium brunneorameum (Merr.) Masam.; Syzygium calcimontanum P.S.Ashton; Syzygium costatum Miq.; Syzygium euneuron Miq.; Syzygium javanicum Miq.; Syzygium tenuicorticum P.S.Ashton; Syzygium zippelianum Miq.

= Syzygium racemosum =

Species of plant in the family Myrtaceae

Syzygium racemosum, the wax jambu, is a species of flowering plant in the family Myrtaceae. It is native to Thailand, Peninsular Malaysia, Java, the Lesser Sunda Islands, and Borneo. It is a tree reaching 37 m (120 ft). It grows in lowland tropical moist forests. It is occasionally harvested for its timber, and a black dye can be made from its bark.

== Subtaxa ==
The following subspecies are accepted:

- Syzygium racemosum subsp. calcimontanum (P.S.Ashton) P.S.Ashton – Sarawak
- Syzygium racemosum subsp. racemosum – Thailand, Malaya, Java, Lesser Sunda Islands, Borneo
