= Jeremiah Jean-Baptiste =

American football player (born 2001)

Profile
- Position: Linebacker

Personal information
- Born: May 31, 2001 (age 25); Florida City, Florida, U.S.
- Listed height: 6 ft 2 in (1.88 m)
- Listed weight: 230 lb (104 kg)

Career information
- High school: South Dade (Homestead, Florida)
- College: UCF (2019–2022); Ole Miss (2023)
- NFL draft: 2024: undrafted

Career history
- Los Angeles Chargers (2024)*
- * Offseason or practice squad member only
- Stats at Pro Football Reference

Jeremiah Arshad Jean-Baptiste (born May 31, 2001) is an American professional football linebacker. He played college football for the UCF Knights and Ole Miss Rebels.

== Early life ==
Jean-Baptiste grew up in Florida City, Florida and attended South Dade Senior High School. During his high school career, he recorded 131 tackles, seven tackles for loss and five sacks as a junior. He would also lead his team to a regional championship game appearance. He was rated the No. 71 inside linebacker in the nation and the No. 213 player in the state of Florida according to 247Sports. He was a three-star rated recruit and committed to play college football for the University of Central Florida over offers from Ole Miss, Buffalo, Georgia Tech and UMass.

== College career ==
=== UCF ===
During his true freshman season in 2019, he played in all 13 games as a reserve linebacker. He finished the season with 12 total tackles (11 solo and one assisted), two tackles for loss and one pass breakup. During the 2020 season, he appeared in all 10 games and started two of them at linebacker. He finished the season with 37 total tackles (27 solo and 10 assisted), 27 unassisted stops and half a tackle for loss. During the 2021 season, he appeared in 12 games and started five of them at linebacker. He finished the season with 51 total tackles (22 solo and 29 assisted), 6.5 tackles for loss, an interception, a sack, two pass breakups and a forced fumble. During the 2022 season, he played in and started 10 games, finishing the season with 52 total tackles (37 solo and 15 assisted), five tackles for loss, four pass breakups and one forced fumble.

On December 6, 2022, Jean-Baptiste announced that he would enter the transfer portal.

=== Ole Miss ===
On December 16, 2022, Jean-Baptiste announced that he would transfer to Ole Miss.

During the 2023 season, he appeared in all 13 games and started 10 of them at linebacker. He finished the season with placing fifth on the team with 54 total tackles (24 solo and 30 assisted), 4.5 tackles for loss, one pass breakup and two quarterback hurries.

On January 2, 2024, Jean-Baptiste announced that he would declare for the 2024 NFL draft.

== Professional career ==
Pre-draft measurables
Height	Weight	Arm length	Hand span	40-yard dash	10-yard split	20-yard split	20-yard shuttle	Three-cone drill	Vertical jump	Broad jump	Bench press
6 ft 1 1/2 in (1.87 m)	231 lb (105 kg)	31 3/8 in (0.80 m)	9 3/8 in (0.24 m)	4.68 s	1.67 s	2.70 s	4.55 s	7.20 s	33.5 in (0.85 m)	8 ft 11 in (2.72 m)	24 reps
All values from Pro Day

On April 27, 2024, Jean-Baptiste signed with the Los Angeles Chargers as an undrafted free agent. He was waived on August 27, and re-signed to the practice squad.

Jean-Baptiste signed a reserve/future contract with Los Angeles on January 13, 2025. On May 13, Jean-Baptiste was waived by the Chargers.
