= Silver Palm, Florida =

Unincorporated community in Florida, U.S.

Coordinates: 25.551°N 80.441°W

Silver Palm is an unincorporated community and historic district in Miami-Dade County, Florida, United States. It is located about 20 miles (32 km) southwest of Miami within the unincorporated community of Redland. Formerly a distinct community in the first half of the 20th century, it has now been absorbed into other communities in the region. The Homestead and Redland District directory for 1927-1928 includes the community of Silver Palm. The community name survives in Silver Palm Drive and the Silver Palm Schoolhouse.

== Geography ==
Silver Palm is located at about 25°33'N 80°27'W (25.551,-80.441), with an elevation 10 feet (3.0 m).

== See also ==
- Silver Palm Schoolhouse
- Silver Palm Drive
