= MacArthur High School =

MacArthur High School may refer to one of several high schools in the United States:

- Douglas MacArthur High School (San Antonio, Texas)
- MacArthur High School (New York) — Levittown, New York
- MacArthur High School (Irving, Texas)
- MacArthur High School (Harris County, Texas)
- Miami MacArthur South Senior High School
- MacArthur High School (Illinois) — Decatur, Illinois
- MacArthur High School (Oklahoma) — Lawton, Oklahoma

See also:

- McArthur High School
