= Glenn Simmons =

Outdoorsman & Glade Skiff Builder

Glen J. Simmons (January 14, 1916 – July 21, 2009) was an outdoorsman and guide who became notable as a master builder of skiffs, the "vessels used to navigate the Everglades," The skill made him a "Florida Local Legacy" and the winner of the Florida Folk Heritage Award in 1995.

Simmons was born January 14, 1916, in the Florida City, Florida area and raised in nearby Homestead, Simmons "spent much of his life in the glades, alone or with other gladesmen, hunting alligators, deer and turtles, as well as fishing"; his family, "like most poor farmers and settlers in the region, lived 'from hand to mouth' during the depression" that followed the Florida land boom of the 1920s.

Starting at the age of 12, Simmons built pole-powered skiffs used to navigate the Florida Everglades prior to the advent of fanboats; originally made of cypress wood, the craft boats were used for hunting and navigation. Simmons earned a living by "hunting, fishing, banana farming, and guiding newcomers."

An interest in writing about his experiences in the Everglades led him to approach Laura Ogden, a professor at Florida International University for help in writing a book: the collaboration led to the 1998 publication of Gladesmen: Gator Hunters, Moonshiners, and Skiffers (ISBN 9780813015736).

Simmons' story was the inspiration for the name and the music of the Florida band Nate Augustus and the Gladezmen.

Simmons died on July 21, 2009.
