= Florida State Road 908 =

Former state highway in Florida, United States

State Road 908
- SW 232nd Street

Route information
- Maintained by FDOT
- Length: 13 mi (21 km)
- Existed: late 1950s–late 1970s

Major junctions
- West end: Country Club Road in Redland
- East end: SR 973 near Cutler Bay

Location
- Country: United States
- State: Florida
- Counties: Dade

Highway system
- Florida State Highway System; Interstate; US; State; Former; Pre‑1945; Toll; Scenic
← SR 907	→ SR 909

From the late 1950s to the 1970s, State Road 908 was a 13-mile-long (21 km), east–west street in southern Dade County, Florida (now Miami–Dade County). Locally, it was known as Southwest 232nd Street, Silver Palm Drive, and Bailes Road. Its western terminus was an intersection with Country Club Road (Southwest 202nd Avenue) in Redland; its eastern terminus was an intersection with Galloway Road (Southwest 87th Avenue) midway between Cutler Bay and Black Point. All but 1.3 miles (2.1 km) of SR 908 was on Silver Palm Drive—the section just east of South Dixie Highway (U.S. Route 1) was bypassed by using US 1 and Bailes Drive in Goulds.

== Route description ==
With the exception of the segment in Goulds, a suburb of Miami, SR 908 passed through agricultural areas (primarily landscape nurseries, cornfields, tomato farms, and elephant ear fields). One mile south of the eastern terminus of the former SR 908, Black Point has evolved from a popular fishing spot to the site of a major Miami-Dade County marina and a primary access to Biscayne National Park.

== History ==
Silver Palm Drive was built in the early 1900s. It was established as State Road 908 in the late 1950s. Although the road lost its status as a state road in the 1970s, the area along the road itself has not significantly changed since then, in contrast to the rapid urbanization to the south of it in Homestead and Florida City, and to the north of it, in Saga Bay and Lakes by the Bay, both now part of Cutler Bay.
