= Cauley Square =

Historic village in Miami, Florida

- Established: 1903
- Location: 22400 Old Dixie Highway, Miami, Florida, U.S.
- Coordinates: 25°33′32″N 80°23′28″W
- Type: Railway town
- Website: www.cauleysquare.com

Cauley Square Historic Village, often shortened to Cauley Square, is a former railway town located in Goulds, Florida, in the United States. Originally built in 1903 by William H. Cauley, it was declared a historic site by Miami-Dade County in 1994.

== History ==
In 1903, the Florida East Coast Railway, created by Henry Flagler, reached the town of Goulds, Florida. William H. Cauley owned 10 acres (4.0 ha) of land in the area; he built Cauley Square in the same year in an attempt to expand the population of Goulds. The buildings were then used to house Flagler's railway employees, as the railways that they worked on passed through the town. Cauley used the village as a shipping hub for his tomatoes, sending them north along the railway when winter came.

In 1926, Cauley Square was abandoned due to the effects of the Great Miami Hurricane. It remained vacant for over 20 years and the buildings were condemned for demolition. In 1949, Mary Anne Ballard bought the property and restored it.

In 1992, when Hurricane Andrew hit Florida, Cauley Square sustained over $1 million worth of damage. The storm heavily damaged most of the shops as well as resulted in the demolition of the majority of the main building's second floor; however, it was repaired.

Miami-Dade County declared Cauley Square a historic site in 1994. Following Ballard's death in 1998, the property was passed down to her family, who then sold it to Honduran native Frances Varela in 2001.

In 2005, Cauley Square was hit by both Hurricane Katrina and Hurricane Wilma, but was restored.
