= Miami MacArthur South Senior High School =

High school in Florida, United States

Coordinates: 25.5212°N 80.4186°W

Location
- 13990 SW 264th St. Naranja, Florida 33032; United States

Information
- Motto: Mac Rising! Unleash the Tiger!
- School district: Miami-Dade County Public Schools
- Website: miamimacsouth.net

Miami MacArthur South Senior High School is a public high school in Naranja, a census-designated place in Miami-Dade County, Florida. It is a part of Miami-Dade County Public Schools. Miami MacArthur South Senior High School is currently located where the former Naranja Elementary School was. The school is known as "The Mac."

Young Men's Academy for Academic and Civic Development (YMAACD) at Miami Douglas MacArthur Senior High School South (MacArthur South), an alternative school, was scheduled to move to the Naranja area for the 2009–2010 school year.
