= Rise Academy-South Dade Charter School =

Defunct school in Florida, United States

Coordinates: 25.4625°N 80.4737°W

Information
- Established: 2008
- Closed: 2010
- Grades: Kindergarten - Grade 7
- Enrollment: c.200

Rise Academy-South Dade Charter School opened in August 2008 and served more than 200 students in Kindergarten through Seventh Grade. It was closed in 2010 after a dispute with Miami-Dade County Public Schools. Test results showed that the school had the biggest improvement in test scores in the county and twice as many sixth-graders at Rise passed the test compared to nearby Campbell Drive Middle School (a traditional public school).
