= Richmond West, Florida =

- Census-designated place
- Location in Miami-Dade County and the state of Florida

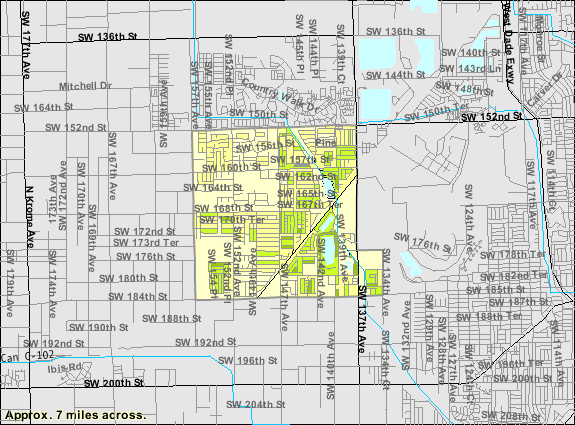
- U.S. Census Bureau map showing CDP boundaries
- Coordinates: 25°37′12″N 80°25′44″W
- Country: United States
- State: Florida
- County: Miami-Dade

Area
  - Total: 4.28 sq mi (11.09 km^{2})
  - Land: 4.17 sq mi (10.80 km^{2})
  - Water: 0.11 sq mi (0.29 km^{2})
- Elevation: 7 ft (2.1 m)

Population (2020)
  - Total: 35,884
  - Density: 8,601.6/sq mi (3,321.09/km^{2})
- Time zone: UTC-5 (Eastern (EST))
  - Summer (DST): UTC-4 (EDT)
- ZIP Codes: 33177, 33187 (Miami)
- Area codes: 305, 786, 645
- FIPS code: 12-60230
- GNIS feature ID: 1853280

Richmond West is a census-designated place (CDP) in Miami-Dade County, Florida, United States. It is part of the Miami metropolitan area of South Florida. The population was 35,884 at the 2020 census, up from 31,973 at the 2010 census.

== History ==
Richmond West has its origins as an early 1900s settlement named Eureka. In 1907, the one-room Eureka Schoolhouse was built at the corner of S.W. 147th Avenue (Naranja Road) and S.W. 184th Street (Eureka Drive). It closed in 1916 when it and six other area one-room schoolhouses were consolidated into the Redland Farm Life School four miles to the south. In 1927, the Seaboard Air Line Railway arrived, building a depot in the settlement, by then known as Richmond. Although the depot has long since been demolished, the railroad line, now owned by Seaboard's successor CSX, remains.

The 1945 Homestead hurricane caused an estimated $50,000,000-worth of damage, impacting the area. Nearly half of the financial loss happened at the neighboring Richmond Naval Air Station, where winds ignited a fire at three hangars, destroying 25 blimps, 366 planes and 150 automobiles.

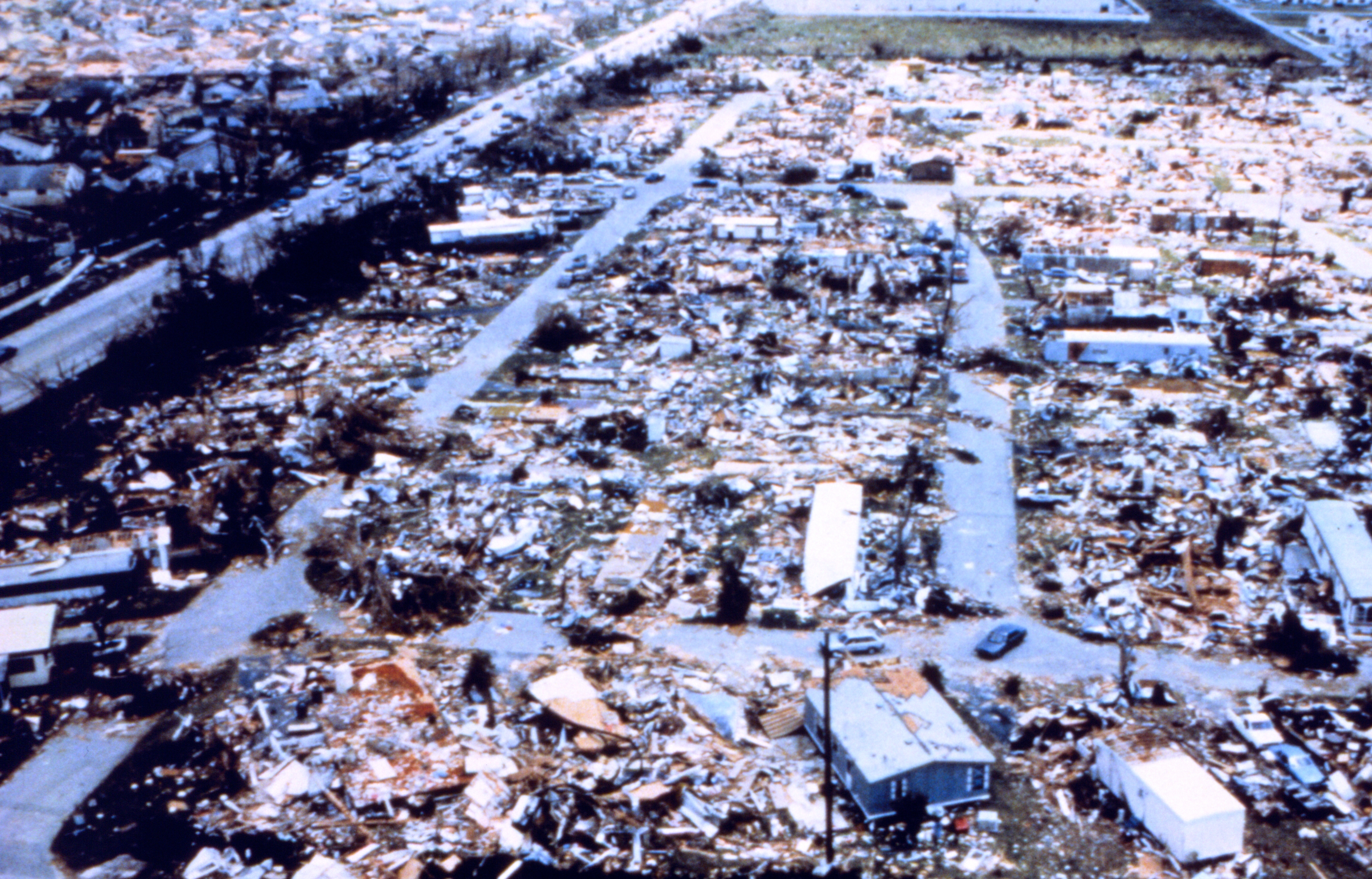
Dadeland Mobile Home Park in Richmond West destroyed by Hurricane Andrew in 1992

The area remained mostly agricultural until the mid-1980s when several sub-developments and the Dadeland Mobile Home Park were built south of S.W. 152nd Street (Coral Reef Drive). In August 1992, Hurricane Andrew destroyed the mobile home park and devastated the surrounding area. Many of the homes and businesses in the area were completely destroyed. In subsequent years, the area was gradually rebuilt, and development proceeded southward to the community's southern border at Eureka Drive.

== Geography ==
Richmond West is located 21 miles (34 km) southwest of downtown Miami. It is bordered to the north by Country Walk, and Zoo Miami is in part of the square mile to the east.

According to the United States Census Bureau, the CDP has a total area of 4.3 square miles (11 km^{2}), of which 4.2 square miles (11 km^{2}) are land and 0.1 square miles (0.26 km^{2}), or 2.59%, are water.

== Demographics ==
Historical population
Census	Pop.	Note	%±
1990	8,583		—
2000	28,082		227.2%
2010	31,973		13.9%
2020	35,884		12.2%
U.S. Decennial Census

=== Racial and ethnic composition ===
Richmond West CDP, Florida – Racial and ethnic composition Note: the US Census treats Hispanic/Latino as an ethnic category. This table excludes Latinos from the racial categories and assigns them to a separate category. Hispanics/Latinos may be of any race.
Race / Ethnicity (NH = Non-Hispanic)	Pop 2010	Pop 2020	% 2010	% 2020
White (NH)	3,764	3,106	11.77%	8.66%
Black or African American (NH)	2,008	1,663	6.28%	4.63%
Native American or Alaska Native (NH)	36	16	0.11%	0.04%
Asian (NH)	598	695	1.87%	1.94%
Pacific Islander or Native Hawaiian (NH)	2	1	0.01%	0.00%
Some other race (NH)	115	224	0.36%	0.62%
Mixed race or Multiracial (NH)	340	504	1.06%	1.40%
Hispanic or Latino (any race)	25,110	29,675	78.54%	82.70%
Total	31,973	35,884	100.00%	100.00%

=== 2020 census ===
As of the 2020 census, Richmond West had a population of 35,884 and 10,505 households. The median age was 40.8 years; 20.5% of residents were under the age of 18 and 14.1% were 65 years of age or older. For every 100 females there were 93.7 males, and for every 100 females age 18 and over there were 90.8 males age 18 and over.

100.0% of residents lived in urban areas, while 0.0% lived in rural areas.

There were 10,505 households in Richmond West, of which 42.3% had children under the age of 18 living in them. Of all households, 59.9% were married-couple households, 10.5% were households with a male householder and no spouse or partner present, and 20.6% were households with a female householder and no spouse or partner present. About 8.7% of all households were made up of individuals and 3.1% had someone living alone who was 65 years of age or older. There were 8,837 families residing in the CDP.

There were 10,705 housing units, of which 1.9% were vacant. The homeowner vacancy rate was 0.6% and the rental vacancy rate was 3.8%.

Racial composition as of the 2020 census
Race	Number	Percent
White	10,007	27.9%
Black or African American	1,877	5.2%
American Indian and Alaska Native	108	0.3%
Asian	748	2.1%
Native Hawaiian and Other Pacific Islander	1	0.0%
Some other race	4,811	13.4%
Two or more races	18,332	51.1%
Hispanic or Latino (of any race)	29,675	82.7%

=== 2010 census ===
As of the 2010 United States census, there were 31,973 people, 8,965 households, and 8,178 families residing in the CDP.

=== 2000 census ===
At the 2000 census, there were 28,082 people, 7,833 households and 7,175 families residing in the CDP. The population density was 6,720.5 per square mile (2,594.8/km^{2}). There were 8,188 housing units at an average density of 1,959.5 per square mile (756.6/km^{2}). The racial make-up of the CDP was 78.33% White (18.8% were Non-Hispanic White), 8.51% African American, 0.21% Native American, 2.29% Asian, 0.06% Pacific Islander, 6.49% from other races and 4.10% from two or more races. Hispanic or Latino of any race were 70.02% of the population.

In 2000, there were 7,833 households, of which 59.0% had children under the age of 18 living with them, 75.7% were married couples living together, 11.2% had a female householder with no husband present and 8.4% were non-families. 4.9% of all households were made up of individuals and 0.7% had someone living alone who was 65 years of age or older. The average household size was 3.59 and the average family size was 3.69.

In 2000, 32.9% of the population were under the age of 18, 7.4% from 18 to 24, 38.5% from 25 to 44, 16.0% from 45 to 64 and 5.2% were 65 years of age or older. The median age was 31 years. For every 100 females, there were 95.5 males. For every 100 females age 18 and over, there were 91.2 males.

As of 2000, the median household income was $59,608 and the median family income for a family was $59,551. Males had a median income of $36,589 and females $26,896. The per capita income was $18,544. About 3.9% of families and 5.6% of the population were below the poverty line, including 6.7% of those under age 18 and 5.0% of those age 65 or over.

As of 2000, speakers of Spanish as a first language accounted for 73.23% of residents, while English made up 24.48%, and French 1.66%.
