= William Anderson General Merchandise Store =

- U.S. National Register of Historic Places
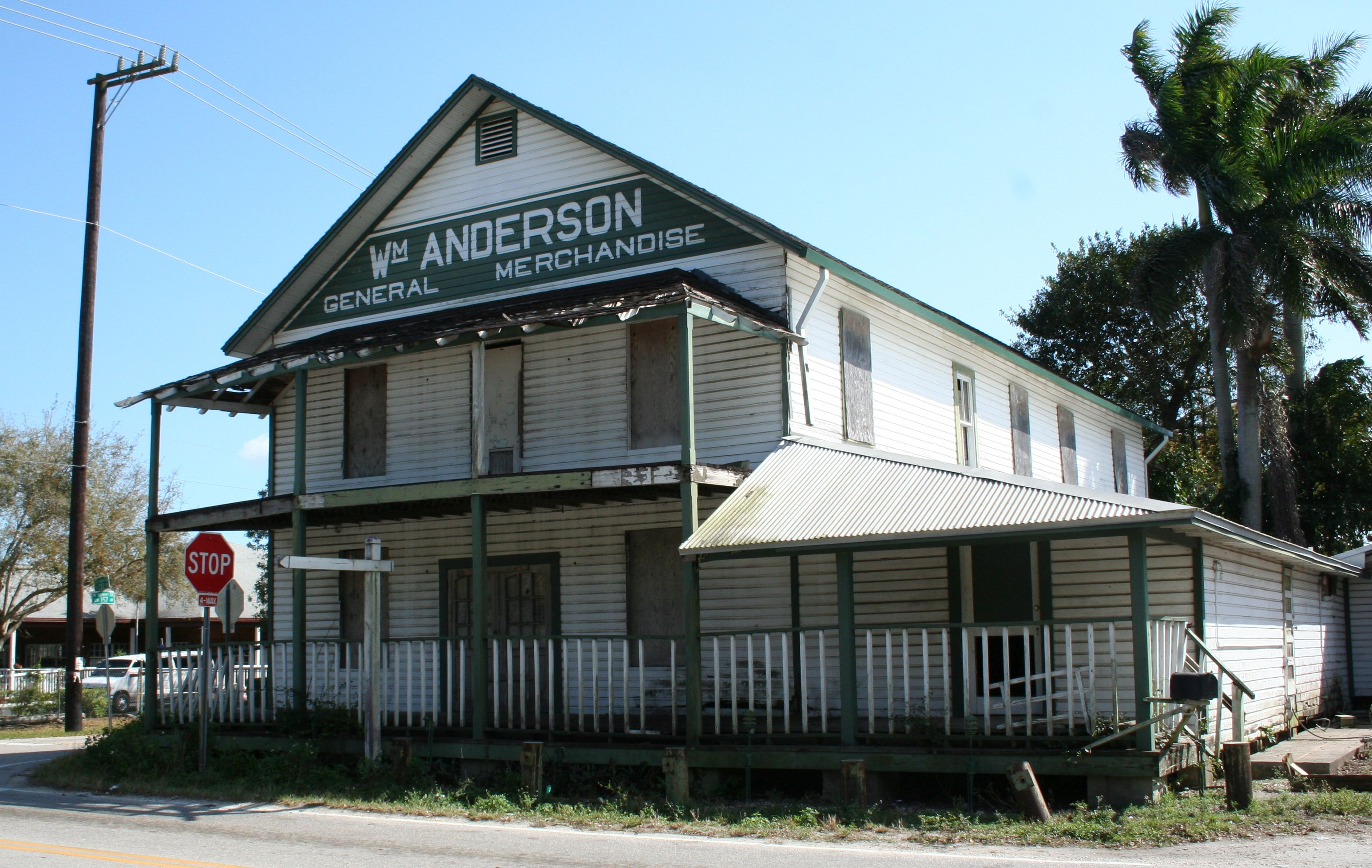
- View of Anderson's Corner looking southeast

- Location within Florida Location within the United States
- Location: Redland, Florida, United States
- Coordinates: 25°33′0″N 80°26′45″W
- Built: 1912
- Architectural style: Frame Vernacular
- NRHP reference No.: 77000402
- Added to NRHP: October 18, 1977

The William Anderson General Merchandise Store (also known as Anderson's Corner) is a historic site in Redland, Florida, United States. Built in 1912 by Mr. Rawls for William “Popp” Anderson, who worked for railroad magnate Henry Flagler, the wood-frame structure is located at 15700 Southwest 232nd Street. It served as a general store for the thriving Redlands agricultural community until the 1930s, when it was converted into apartments. Condemned in 1975, it was granted a reprieve for rehabilitation and was eventually converted into the successful Harvest House restaurant. After being ravaged by Hurricane Andrew in 1992, the building was partially restored, although it has remained vacant since.

On October 18, 1977, the William Anderson General Merchandise Store was added to the National Register of Historic Places. It was designated a historic building by Miami-Dade County in 1981. As of 2019, it is on the Dade Heritage Trust list of the 12 Most Endangered Sites in Miami-Dade County.

== History and description ==
William "Popp" Anderson of Indiana is the namesake of the home. He worked for railroad magnate Henry Flagler and moved to the Redland area of southern Miami-Dade County (then known as Dade County) in the early 20th century, as his friend Charles Gossman lived there, who was one of the area's first settlers. Around 1911, Anderson founded The William Anderson General Merchandise Store, which sold a wide variety of products. A man only identified as Mr. Rawls erected a store building for Anderson by 1912. Prior to the existence of stores such as this, residents often had to travel by horse and buggy to Cutler – a distance of approximately 15 miles (24 km) – for supplies.

The store, located at 15700 Southwest 232nd Street, is a two-story wood-frame structure. It is also known as Anderson's Corner due to being situated at the corner of 232nd Street and Newton Road. The building served as a general store for the thriving Redlands agricultural community until the 1930s, when it was converted into apartments. After Anderson died in 1961, his son took over the property and then sold it to James M. and Eleanor P. Cothron in 1970. Condemned in 1975, it was granted a reprieve for rehabilitation and was eventually converted into the successful Harvest House restaurant. On October 18, 1977, the William Anderson General Merchandise Store was added to the National Register of Historic Places. It was designated a historic building by Miami-Dade County in 1981.

Hurricane Andrew ravaged the building in 1992, with the Miami Herald noting that "most of the damage lies on the second floor, which has shifted west. Front gable truss fell. Severe damage to roof covering." When the 1993 session of the Florida Legislature approved almost $800,000 in restoration grants for 11 historic sites in southern Miami-Dade County, Anderson's Corner received $255,000. The building was partially restored, although it has remained vacant since. As of 2021, it is on the Dade Heritage Trust list of most endangered historic sites in Miami-Dade County.

== See also ==
- National Register of Historic Places listings in Miami-Dade County, Florida
