= Naranja, Florida =

- Census-designated place
- Location in Miami-Dade County and the state of Florida

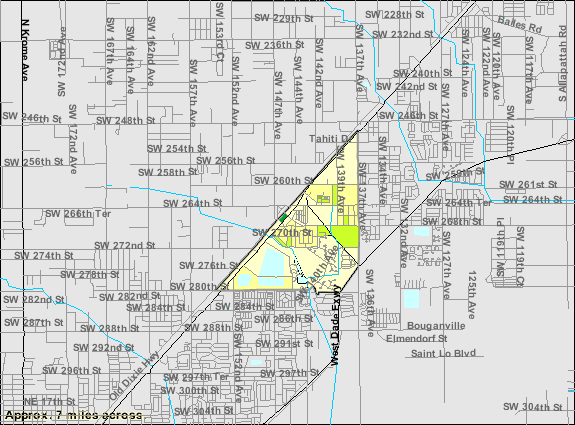
- U.S. Census Bureau map showing CDP boundaries
- Coordinates: 25°30′59″N 80°25′20″W
- Country: United States
- State: Florida
- County: Miami-Dade

Area
  - Total: 1.68 sq mi (4.36 km^{2})
  - Land: 1.50 sq mi (3.88 km^{2})
  - Water: 0.19 sq mi (0.48 km^{2})
- Elevation: 7 ft (2.1 m)

Population (2020)
  - Total: 13,509
  - Density: 9,014.9/sq mi (3,480.67/km^{2})
- Time zone: UTC-5 (Eastern (EST))
  - Summer (DST): UTC-4 (EDT)
- ZIP codes: 33032, 33092
- Area codes: 305, 786, 645
- FIPS code: 12-47700
- GNIS feature ID: 2403326

Naranja is an unincorporated community and census-designated place (CDP) in Miami-Dade County, Florida, United States. Many orange groves were once located in this area, so the community name came from the Spanish word for orange, naranja, though the pronunciation among the local residents is "Na-Ran-Jah". Naranja was also a stop for the Florida East Coast Railroad that once ran through this area. It is part of the Miami metropolitan area of South Florida. The population was 13,509 at the 2020 census, up from 8,303 in 2010.

== Geography ==
Naranja is located 25 miles (40 km) southwest of downtown Miami. It is bordered to the north and east by Princeton and to the south by Leisure City, and the city of Homestead is 5 miles (8 km) to the southwest.

U.S. Route 1 (Dixie Highway) runs along the northwest edge of the community. The Homestead Extension of Florida's Turnpike touches the southeast corner of the community, with partial access from Exit 6 (Tallahassee Road) and full access from Exit 5 (Biscayne Drive) in Leisure City.

According to the United States Census Bureau, the Naranja CDP has a total area of 1.7 square miles (4.4 km^{2}), of which 1.5 square miles (3.9 km^{2}) are land and 0.2 square miles (0.5 km^{2}), or 10.99%, are water.

== Demographics ==
Historical population
Census	Pop.	Note	%±
1960	2,309		—
1990	5,790		—
2000	4,034		−30.3%
2010	8,303		105.8%
2020	13,509		62.7%

=== Racial and ethnic composition ===
Naranja CDP, Florida – Racial and ethnic composition Note: the US Census treats Hispanic/Latino as an ethnic category. This table excludes Latinos from the racial categories and assigns them to a separate category. Hispanics/Latinos may be of any race.
Race / Ethnicity (NH = Non-Hispanic)	Pop 2000	Pop 2010	Pop 2020	% 2000	% 2010	% 2020
White alone (NH)	511	519	696	12.67%	6.25%	5.15%
Black or African American alone (NH)	2,287	3,172	4,150	56.69%	38.20%	30.72%
Native American or Alaska Native alone (NH)	9	11	14	0.22%	0.13%	0.10%
Asian alone (NH)	48	193	224	1.19%	2.32%	1.66%
Native Hawaiian or Pacific Islander alone (NH)	6	1	2	0.15%	0.01%	0.01%
Other race alone (NH)	6	31	89	0.15%	0.37%	0.66%
Mixed race or Multiracial (NH)	79	91	203	1.96%	1.10%	1.50%
Hispanic or Latino (any race)	1,088	4,285	8,131	26.97%	51.61%	60.19%
Total	4,034	8,303	13,509	100.00%	100.00%	100.00%

=== 2020 census ===
As of the 2020 census, Naranja had a population of 13,509. The median age was 31.3 years. 29.5% of residents were under the age of 18 and 8.1% of residents were 65 years of age or older. For every 100 females there were 86.8 males, and for every 100 females age 18 and over there were 81.6 males age 18 and over.

100.0% of residents lived in urban areas, while 0.0% lived in rural areas.

There were 4,420 households in Naranja, of which 47.6% had children under the age of 18 living in them. Of all households, 35.5% were married-couple households, 16.5% were households with a male householder and no spouse or partner present, and 37.4% were households with a female householder and no spouse or partner present. About 18.1% of all households were made up of individuals and 4.0% had someone living alone who was 65 years of age or older.

There were 4,799 housing units, of which 7.9% were vacant. The homeowner vacancy rate was 2.3% and the rental vacancy rate was 7.5%.

=== Demographic estimates ===
In the 2020 American Community Survey, there were 2,798 families residing in the CDP.

=== 2010 census ===
As of the 2010 United States census, there were 8,303 people, 2,081 households, and 1,537 families residing in the CDP.

=== 2000 census ===
As of the census of 2000, there were 4,034 people, 1,196 households, and 875 families residing in the CDP. The population density was 2,654.6 inhabitants per square mile (1,024.9/km^{2}). There were 1,630 housing units at an average density of 1,072.7 per square mile (414.2/km^{2}). The racial makeup of the CDP was 32.99% White (12.7% were Non-Hispanic White), 57.54% African American, 0.42% Native American, 1.39% Asian, 0.15% Pacific Islander, 3.89% from other races, and 3.62% from two or more races. Hispanic or Latino of any race were 26.97% of the population.

As of 2000, there were 1,196 households, out of which 48.7% had children under the age of 18 living with them, 30.4% were married couples living together, 36.0% had a female householder with no husband present, and 26.8% were non-families. 20.6% of all households were made up of individuals, and 5.9% had someone living alone who was 65 years of age or older. The average household size was 3.23 and the average family size was 3.73.

In 2000, in the CDP, the population was spread out, with 39.5% under the age of 18, 11.3% from 18 to 24, 27.8% from 25 to 44, 14.0% from 45 to 64, and 7.4% who were 65 years of age or older. The median age was 24 years. For every 100 females, there were 90.6 males. For every 100 females age 18 and over, there were 82.7 males.

In 2000, the median income for a household in the CDP was $18,825, and the median income for a family was $19,443. Males had a median income of $22,614 versus $19,167 for females. The per capita income for the CDP was $7,346. About 42.3% of families and 50.5% of the population were below the poverty line, including 62.7% of those under age 18 and 19.8% of those age 65 or over.

As of 2000, speakers of English as a first language accounted for 66.25% of residents, while Spanish made up 28.14%, French Creole was at 4.64%, and Tagalog was the mother tongue of 0.95% of the population.

== Education ==
Miami-Dade County Public Schools operates area public schools.

Dr. William A. Chapman Elementary School, which opened in 1976, serves the Naranja community, and is located in the CDP. Also serving the Naranja community is Coconut Palm K-8 Academy, which replaced the former Naranja Elementary School. This school is located approximately 3 miles from the former Naranja Elementary School.

Young Men's Academy for Academic and Civic Development (YMAACD) at Miami Douglas MacArthur Senior High School South (MacArthur South), an alternative school, was scheduled to move to the Naranja area for the 2009-2010 school year, in the location of the former Naranja Elementary School. The name has since been changed to Miami Macarthur Educational Center.

Miami MacArthur South Senior High School is also in the CDP. This is a public, alternative school located in Naranja, Florida. It has approximately 107 students in grades 6-12 with a teacher student ratio of 5-1. According to state test scores, at least 10% of the students are proficient in math and 10% in reading.

== Notable person ==
- Jamal Carter (born 1994), American football player

== See also ==
- Naranja-Princeton, Florida, a single census area recorded during the 1980 Census
