= Leisure City, Florida =

- Census-designated place
- Location in Miami-Dade County and the state of Florida

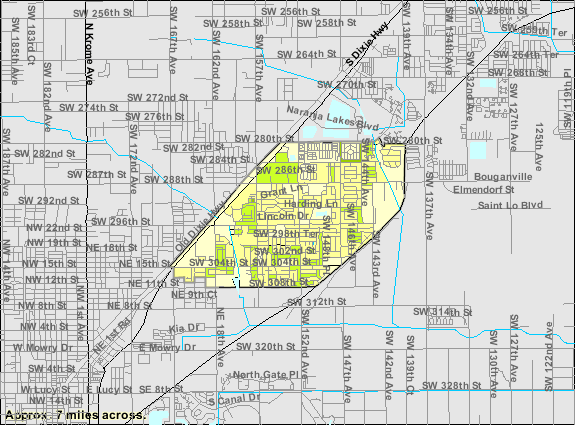
- U.S. Census Bureau map showing CDP boundaries
- Coordinates: 25°29′52″N 80°25′58″W
- Country: United States
- State: Florida
- County: Miami-Dade

Area
  - Total: 3.33 sq mi (8.62 km^{2})
  - Land: 3.26 sq mi (8.45 km^{2})
  - Water: 0.066 sq mi (0.17 km^{2})
- Elevation: 10 ft (3.0 m)

Population (2020)
  - Total: 26,324
  - Density: 8,069.3/sq mi (3,115.59/km^{2})
- Time zone: UTC-5 (Eastern (EST))
  - Summer (DST): UTC-4 (EDT)
- ZIP code: 33033 (Homestead)
- Area codes: 305, 786, 645
- FIPS code: 12-39950
- GNIS feature ID: 2403227

Leisure City is an unincorporated community and census-designated place (CDP) in Miami-Dade County, Florida, United States, that includes the smaller, older community of Modello in its northwestern section. The CDP is most notable for the Coral Castle Museum, located in the Modello area. It is located in the Miami metropolitan area of South Florida. The population was 26,324 at the 2020 census, up from 22,655 in 2010.

== Geography ==
Leisure City is located 27 miles (43 km) southwest of Miami. It is bordered to the south and east by the city of Homestead and to the north by unincorporated Naranja. Unincorporated Redland is to the northwest.

U.S. Route 1 runs along the northwest edge of the community, leading south into Homestead and northeast to Miami. The Homestead Extension of Florida's Turnpike runs along the Homestead city line at the southeast edge of the community, with access from Exit 2 (SW 157th Avenue) just south of Leisure City and from Exit 5 (SW 288th Street) at the community's eastern edge.

According to the United States Census Bureau, the CDP has a total area of 3.33 square miles (8.6 km^{2}), of which 3.26 square miles (8.4 km^{2}) are land and 0.07 square miles (0.18 km^{2}), or 2.01%, are water.

=== Climate ===
The Köppen Climate Classification sub-type for this climate is "Aw" (Tropical Savanna Climate).

Climate data for Leisure City, Florida
Month	Jan	Feb	Mar	Apr	May	Jun	Jul	Aug	Sep	Oct	Nov	Dec	Year
Mean daily maximum °C (°F)	25 (77)	26 (78)	27 (81)	29 (84)	31 (87)	32 (89)	32 (90)	33 (91)	32 (89)	30 (86)	27 (81)	26 (78)	29 (84)
Mean daily minimum °C (°F)	12 (54)	12 (54)	14 (58)	16 (61)	19 (66)	21 (70)	22 (71)	22 (71)	22 (71)	19 (67)	16 (61)	13 (56)	17 (63)
Average precipitation mm (inches)	43 (1.7)	48 (1.9)	56 (2.2)	84 (3.3)	160 (6.4)	230 (9.2)	200 (7.8)	210 (8.2)	250 (9.7)	200 (7.7)	66 (2.6)	33 (1.3)	1,600 (62)
Source: Weatherbase

== Demographics ==
Historical population
Census	Pop.	Note	%±
1960	3,001		—
1980	17,905		—
1990	19,379		8.2%
2000	22,152		14.3%
2010	22,655		2.3%
2020	26,324		16.2%

=== Racial and ethnic composition ===
Leisure City CDP, Florida – Racial and ethnic composition Note: the US Census treats Hispanic/Latino as an ethnic category. This table excludes Latinos from the racial categories and assigns them to a separate category. Hispanics/Latinos may be of any race.
Race / Ethnicity (NH = Non-Hispanic)	Pop 2010	Pop 2020	% 2010	% 2020
White (NH)	1,809	1,570	7.98%	5.96%
Black or African American (NH)	3,473	3,441	15.33%	13.07%
Native American or Alaska Native (NH)	17	14	0.08%	0.05%
Asian (NH)	186	213	0.82%	0.81%
Pacific Islander or Native Hawaiian (NH)	0	0	0.00%	0.00%
Some other race (NH)	52	86	0.23%	0.33%
Mixed race or Multiracial (NH)	140	231	0.62%	0.88%
Hispanic or Latino (any race)	16,978	20,769	74.94%	78.90%
Total	22,655	26,324	100.00%	100.00%

=== 2020 census ===
As of the 2020 census, Leisure City had a population of 26,324. The median age was 35.2 years. 26.1% of residents were under the age of 18 and 12.4% of residents were 65 years of age or older. For every 100 females there were 96.8 males, and for every 100 females age 18 and over there were 93.0 males age 18 and over.

100.0% of residents lived in urban areas, while 0.0% lived in rural areas.

There were 7,782 households in Leisure City, of which 43.5% had children under the age of 18 living in them. Of all households, 42.8% were married-couple households, 16.3% were households with a male householder and no spouse or partner present, and 29.7% were households with a female householder and no spouse or partner present. About 15.0% of all households were made up of individuals and 5.7% had someone living alone who was 65 years of age or older. There were 6,006 families in the CDP.

There were 8,054 housing units, of which 3.4% were vacant. The homeowner vacancy rate was 1.1% and the rental vacancy rate was 3.7%.

=== 2010 census ===
As of the 2010 United States census, there were 22,655 people, 6,134 households, and 4,811 families residing in the CDP.

=== 2000 census ===
At the 2000 census, there were 22,152 people, 6,063 households and 5,044 families residing in the CDP. The population density was 6,490.0 inhabitants per square mile (2,505.8/km^{2}). There were 6,615 housing units at an average density of 1,938.0 per square mile (748.3/km^{2}). The racial makeup of the CDP was 65.03% White (15.2% were Non-Hispanic White), 18.00% African American, 0.20% Native American, 0.84% Asian, 0.03% Pacific Islander, 11.42% from other races, and 4.48% from two or more races. Hispanic or Latino of any race were 65.30% of the population.

As of 2000, there were 6,063 households, of which 50.1% had children under the age of 18 living with them, 54.7% were married couples living together, 21.0% had a female householder with no husband present, and 16.8% were non-families. 12.7% of all households were made up of individuals, and 4.3% had someone living alone who was 65 years of age or older. The average household size was 3.65 and the average family size was 3.94.

In 2000, 36.2% of the population were under the age of 18, 10.9% from 18 to 24, 30.1% from 25 to 44, 16.5% from 45 to 64, and 6.3% who were 65 years of age or older. The median age was 27 years. For every 100 females, there were 101.5 males. For every 100 females age 18 and over, there were 98.1 males.

In 2000, the median household income was $29,091 and the median family income was $29,277. Males had a median income of $22,320 and females $18,619. The per capita income was $9,966. About 22.4% of families and 25.0% of the population were below the poverty line, including 33.3% of those under age 18 and 18.3% of those age 65 or over.

In 2000, speakers of Spanish as a first language accounted for 64.83% of residents, while English made up 31.02%, French Creole was at 4.01%, and Tagalog was the mother tongue of 0.12% of the population.

== Education ==
Leisure City is a part of the Miami-Dade County Public Schools system and has three schools: Leisure City K-8, Homestead High School and South Dade High School.
