= Princeton, Florida =

- Census-designated place
- Location in Miami-Dade County and the state of Florida

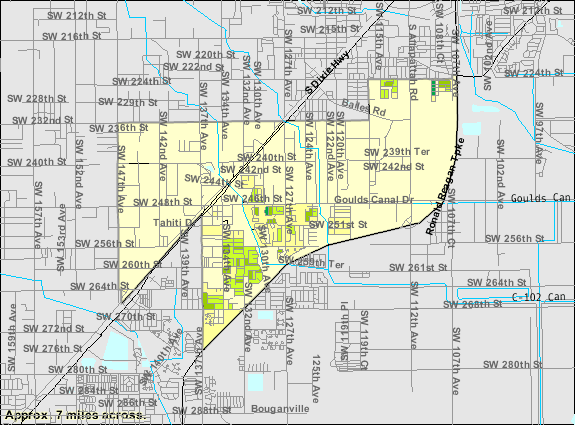
- U.S. Census Bureau map showing CDP boundaries
- Coordinates: 25°32′34″N 80°23′21″W
- Country: United States
- State: Florida
- County: Miami-Dade

Area
  - Total: 7.47 sq mi (19.34 km^{2})
  - Land: 7.42 sq mi (19.21 km^{2})
  - Water: 0.050 sq mi (0.13 km^{2})
- Elevation: 7 ft (2.1 m)

Population (2020)
  - Total: 39,308
  - Density: 5,299.5/sq mi (2,046.13/km^{2})
- Time zone: UTC-5 (Eastern (EST))
  - Summer (DST): UTC-4 (EDT)
- ZIP codes: 33032, 33092 (Princeton); 33170 (Goulds)
- Area codes: 305, 786, 645
- FIPS code: 12-58975
- GNIS feature ID: 2403449

Princeton is a census-designated place (CDP) and unincorporated community in Miami-Dade County, Florida, United States. It is part of the Miami metropolitan area of South Florida. The population was 39,208 at the 2020 census, up from 22,038 at the 2010 census.

== History ==
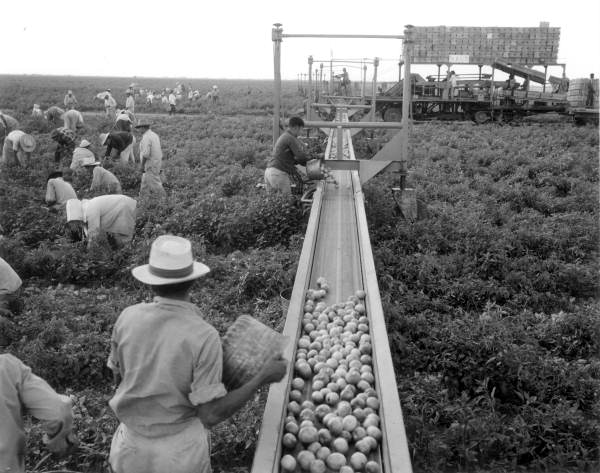
Harvesters using a conveyor belt in order to aid with tomato harvesting in Princeton, Florida (1957)

As a small town and depot along the Florida East Coast Railroad in the 1900s, the community was named by Gaston Drake after his alma mater, Princeton University. Many of the town buildings were even painted the school's colors: black and orange. Drake operated a saw mill and lumber company in Princeton supplying Miami, the Florida Keys and Cuba until the local timber gave out in 1923.

== Geography ==
Princeton is located 24 miles (39 km) southwest of downtown Miami and 6 miles (10 km) northeast of Homestead. It is bordered to the north by Goulds and to the southwest by Naranja, both unincorporated.

U.S. Route 1 (Dixie Highway) runs northeast to southwest through Princeton, and the Homestead Extension of Florida's Turnpike forms the eastern edge of the community, with access from Exit 9 (Florida State Road 989).

According to the United States Census Bureau, the CDP has a total area of 7.5 square miles (19 km^{2}), of which 0.05 square miles (0.13 km^{2}), or 0.67%, are water.

== Demographics ==
Historical population
Census	Pop.	Note	%±
1960	1,719		—
1990	7,073		—
2000	10,090		42.7%
2010	22,038		118.4%
2020	39,308		78.4%

=== Racial and ethnic composition ===
Princeton CDP, Florida – Racial and ethnic composition Note: the US Census treats Hispanic/Latino as an ethnic category. This table excludes Latinos from the racial categories and assigns them to a separate category. Hispanics/Latinos may be of any race.
Race / Ethnicity (NH = Non-Hispanic)	Pop 2010	Pop 2020	% 2010	% 2020
White (NH)	1,857	2,724	8.43%	6.93%
Black or African American (NH)	6,165	7,001	27.97%	17.81%
Native American or Alaska Native (NH)	26	22	0.12%	0.06%
Asian (NH)	297	574	1.35%	1.46%
Pacific Islander or Native Hawaiian (NH)	10	3	0.05%	0.01%
Some other race (NH)	49	209	0.22%	0.53%
Mixed race or Multiracial (NH)	218	630	0.99%	1.60%
Hispanic or Latino (any race)	13,416	28,145	60.88%	71.60%
Total	22,038	39,308	100.00%	100.00%

=== 2020 census ===
As of the 2020 census, Princeton had a population of 39,308. The median age was 34.5 years. 27.0% of residents were under the age of 18 and 9.6% of residents were 65 years of age or older. For every 100 females there were 92.6 males, and for every 100 females age 18 and over there were 88.1 males age 18 and over.

There were 7,058 families residing in the CDP.

99.3% of residents lived in urban areas, while 0.7% lived in rural areas.

There were 11,145 households in Princeton, of which 51.8% had children under the age of 18 living in them. Of all households, 52.0% were married-couple households, 11.9% were households with a male householder and no spouse or partner present, and 25.0% were households with a female householder and no spouse or partner present. About 9.8% of all households were made up of individuals and 3.2% had someone living alone who was 65 years of age or older.

There were 11,557 housing units, of which 3.6% were vacant. The homeowner vacancy rate was 1.5% and the rental vacancy rate was 4.1%.

Racial composition as of the 2020 census
Race	Number	Percent
White	9,593	24.4%
Black or African American	7,501	19.1%
American Indian and Alaska Native	142	0.4%
Asian	594	1.5%
Native Hawaiian and Other Pacific Islander	5	0.0%
Some other race	5,567	14.2%
Two or more races	15,906	40.5%
Hispanic or Latino (of any race)	28,145	71.6%

=== 2010 census ===
As of the 2010 United States census, there were 22,038 people, 5,688 households, and 4,807 families residing in the CDP.

=== 2000 census ===
As of the census of 2000, there were 10,090 people, 2,732 households, and 2,341 families residing in the CDP. The population density was 1,373.3 inhabitants per square mile (530.2/km^{2}). There were 2,906 housing units at an average density of 395.5 per square mile (152.7/km^{2}). The racial makeup of the CDP was 53.78% White (18% were Non-Hispanic White), 32.54% African American, 0.34% Native American, 1.37% Asian, 0.06% Pacific Islander, 7.70% from other races, and 4.22% from two or more races. Hispanic or Latino of any race were 47.49% of the population.

As of 2000, there were 2,732 households, out of which 52.4% had children under the age of 18 living with them, 56.8% were married couples living together, 22.4% had a female householder with no husband present, and 14.3% were non-families. 10.0% of all households were made up of individuals, and 2.3% had someone living alone who was 65 years of age or older. The average household size was 3.63 and the average family size was 3.85.

In 2000, in the CDP, the population was spread out, with 36.1% under the age of 18, 10.2% from 18 to 24, 30.0% from 25 to 44, 17.7% from 45 to 64, and 6.0% who were 65 years of age or older. The median age was 28 years. For every 100 females, there were 97.0 males. For every 100 females age 18 and over, there were 92.6 males.

In 2000, the median income for a household in the CDP was $39,556, and the median income for a family was $41,896. Males had a median income of $32,101 versus $23,634 for females. The per capita income for the CDP was $12,918. About 19.8% of families and 23.8% of the population were below the poverty line, including 33.1% of those under age 18 and 14.4% of those age 65 or over.

As of 2000, speakers of English as a first language accounted for 50.02% of residents; Spanish made up 49.24%, and French Creole was the first language for 0.72% of the population.

== See also ==
- Naranja-Princeton, a single census area recorded during the 1980 census.
