= Goulds, Florida =

- Census-designated place
- Location in Miami-Dade County and the state of Florida

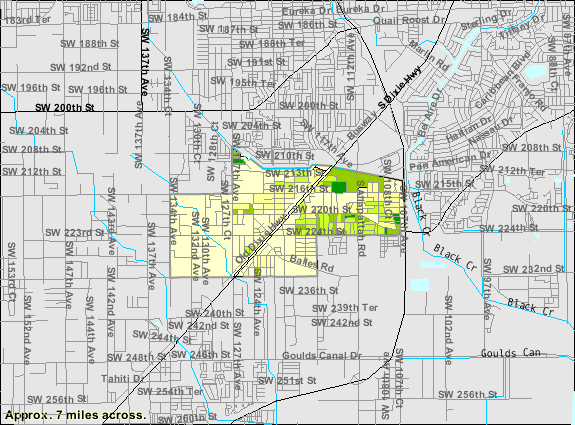
- U.S. Census Bureau map showing CDP boundaries
- Coordinates: 25°33′46″N 80°22′40″W
- Country: United States
- State: Florida
- County: Miami-Dade

Area
  - Total: 2.93 sq mi (7.58 km^{2})
  - Land: 2.91 sq mi (7.53 km^{2})
  - Water: 0.019 sq mi (0.05 km^{2})
- Elevation: 10 ft (3.0 m)

Population (2020)
  - Total: 11,446
  - Density: 3,934.7/sq mi (1,519.21/km^{2})
- Time zone: UTC-5 (Eastern (EST))
  - Summer (DST): UTC-4 (EDT)
- ZIP code: 33170
- Area codes: 305, 786, 645
- FIPS code: 12-26950
- GNIS feature ID: 2402542

Goulds is an unincorporated community and census-designated place (CDP) in Miami-Dade County, Florida, United States. It is part of the Miami metropolitan area of South Florida. As of the 2020 US census, the population stood at 11,446, up from 10,103 in 2010 US census.

== History ==
The area that became Goulds was settled in 1900 by homesteaders. It received its name when the Florida East Coast Railway built a siding in 1903, operated by an employee of the railroad named Lyman Goulds. It was first known as "Gould's Siding", and later shortened to "Goulds". Many packing houses were built along the Old Dixie Highway. Early on, Goulds had a reputation as a rough town, with several saloons serving itinerant field workers. The area was originally populated as the result of a stop on the Florida East Coast Railroad. The railroad depot was located near the current Southwest 224th Street. The community was named after its operator, Lyman Gould, who cut trees for railroad ties.

Most of the packing houses were destroyed by a tornado in 1919, or the 1926 Miami Hurricane, but were rebuilt. Cauley Square, a former railway town located in Goulds, was restored by Mary Ann Ballard after she purchased the village in 1949.

== Geography ==
Goulds is located 20 miles (32 km) southwest of downtown Miami and 9 miles (14 km) northeast of Homestead. It is bordered to the north by South Miami Heights, to the northeast by Cutler Bay, and to the south by Princeton. According to the United States Census Bureau, the CDP has a total area of 2.9 square miles (7.5 km^{2}), of which 0.02 square miles (0.05 km^{2}), or 0.61%, are water.

U.S. Route 1 (Dixie Highway) is the main road through the community.

== Demographics ==
Historical population
Census	Pop.	Note	%±
2000	7,453		—
2010	10,103		35.6%
2020	11,446		13.3%
U.S. Decennial Census

=== Racial and ethnic composition ===
Goulds CDP, Florida – Racial and ethnic composition Note: the US Census treats Hispanic/Latino as an ethnic category. This table excludes Latinos from the racial categories and assigns them to a separate category. Hispanics/Latinos may be of any race.
Race / Ethnicity (NH = Non-Hispanic)	Pop 2000	Pop 2010	Pop 2020	% 2000	% 2010	% 2020
White alone (NH)	362	429	508	4.86%	4.25%	4.44%
Black or African American alone (NH)	5,726	5,330	4,446	76.83%	52.76%	38.84%
Native American or Alaska Native alone (NH)	8	4	9	0.11%	0.04%	0.08%
Asian alone (NH)	39	60	71	0.52%	0.59%	0.62%
Native Hawaiian or Pacific Islander alone (NH)	1	0	1	0.01%	0.00%	0.01%
Other race alone (NH)	15	14	60	0.20%	0.14%	0.52%
Mixed race or Multiracial (NH)	83	122	165	1.11%	1.21%	1.44%
Hispanic or Latino (any race)	1,219	4,144	6,186	16.36%	41.02%	54.05%
Total	7,453	10,103	11,446	100.00%	100.00%	100.00%

=== 2020 census ===
As of the 2020 census, Goulds had a population of 11,446. The median age was 35.7 years. 25.8% of residents were under the age of 18 and 12.6% of residents were 65 years of age or older. For every 100 females there were 91.8 males, and for every 100 females age 18 and over there were 87.6 males age 18 and over.

99.8% of residents lived in urban areas, while 0.2% lived in rural areas.

There were 3,547 households in Goulds, of which 44.3% had children under the age of 18 living in them. Of all households, 35.1% were married-couple households, 17.8% were households with a male householder and no spouse or partner present, and 36.7% were households with a female householder and no spouse or partner present. About 17.5% of all households were made up of individuals and 4.8% had someone living alone who was 65 years of age or older.

There were 3,800 housing units, of which 6.7% were vacant. The homeowner vacancy rate was 1.2% and the rental vacancy rate was 5.4%.

The Census Bureau's 2016–2020 American Community Survey estimated that 2,371 families resided in the CDP.

=== 2010 census ===
As of the 2010 United States census, there were 10,103 people, 2,453 households, and 1,925 families residing in the CDP.

=== 2000 census ===
As of 2000, there were 7,453 people, 2,214 households, and 1,762 families residing in the CDP. The population density was 972.2 people/km^{2} (2,518 people/mi^{2}). There were 2,367 housing units at an average density of 308.8 units/km^{2} (800 units/mi^{2}). The racial makeup of the CDP was 15.22% White (4.9% were Non-Hispanic White), 78.13% African American, 0.17% Native American, 0.54% Asian, 0.01% Pacific Islander, 3.48% from other races, and 2.46% from two or more races. Hispanic or Latino of any race were 16.36% of the population.

As of 2000, there were 2,214 households out of which 45.5% had children under the age of 18 living with them, 31.5% were married couples living together, 41.2% had a female householder with no husband present, and 20.4% were non-families. 15.7% of all households were made up of individuals and 5.2% had someone living alone who was 65 years of age or older. The average household size was 3.37 and the average family size was 3.72.

In 2000, in the CDP the population was spread out with 38.4% under the age of 18, 10.9% from 18 to 24, 25.1% from 25 to 44, 16.3% from 45 to 64, and 9.2% who were 65 years of age or older. The median age was 26 years. For every 100 females there were 86.8 males. For every 100 females age 18 and over, there were 77.3 males.

In 2000, the median income for a household in the CDP was $19,633, and the median income for a family was $21,728. Males had a median income of $23,165 versus $20,017 for females. The per capita income for the CDP was $8,649. About 37.6% of families and 43.6% of the population were below the poverty line, including 56.6% of those under age 18 and 32.3% of those age 65 or over.

As of 2000, speakers of English as a first language accounted for 83.54% of residents, while Spanish made up 15.42%, and French Creole was at 1.02% of the population.

As of 2000, Goulds had the eighty-fourth highest percentage of African-American and black residents in the US, with 78.10% of the populace. It had the third highest percentage of Bahamian residents in the US, at 2.0% of the population, and the sixty-ninth highest percentage of Cuban residents in the US, at 4.70% of its population. It also had the thirty-second most Jamaicans in the US, at 4.10% (tied with Tamarac and Royal Palm Beach,) while it had the fifty-fourth highest percentage of Haitians, at 2.70% of all residents (tied with Jewett City, Connecticut, Georgetown, Delaware and Elizabeth, NJ.) Goulds' Nicaraguan community had the thirty-sixth highest percentage of residents, which was at 1.15% of the population.

== Education ==
The Miami-Dade County Public Schools district serves Goulds.
