= List of schools in the Roman Catholic Archdiocese of Miami =

This is a list of schools in the Roman Catholic Archdiocese of Miami.

== High schools ==
Directly operated by the archdiocese :

High school	Year *	Neighborhood	City
Archbishop Coleman F. Carroll High School	1998	The Hammocks	Unincorporated area
Archbishop Edward A. McCarthy High School	1998		Southwest Ranches
Cardinal Gibbons High School	1961		Fort Lauderdale
Immaculata-LaSalle High School	1958	Coconut Grove	Miami
Monsignor Edward Pace High School	1961		Miami Gardens
Our Lady of Lourdes Academy	1963	Ponce-Davis	Unincorporated area
St. Brendan High School	1975	Westchester	Unincorporated area
St. Thomas Aquinas High School	1936		Fort Lauderdale

Sponsored by the archdiocese:

High school	Year *	Neighborhood	City
Belen Jesuit Preparatory School	1854	Tamiami	Unincorporated area
Carrollton School of the Sacred Heart	1961	Coconut Grove	Miami
Chaminade-Madonna College Preparatory School	1960		Hollywood
Christopher Columbus High School	1958	Westchester	Unincorporated area

== Grade schools ==
=== Broward County ===
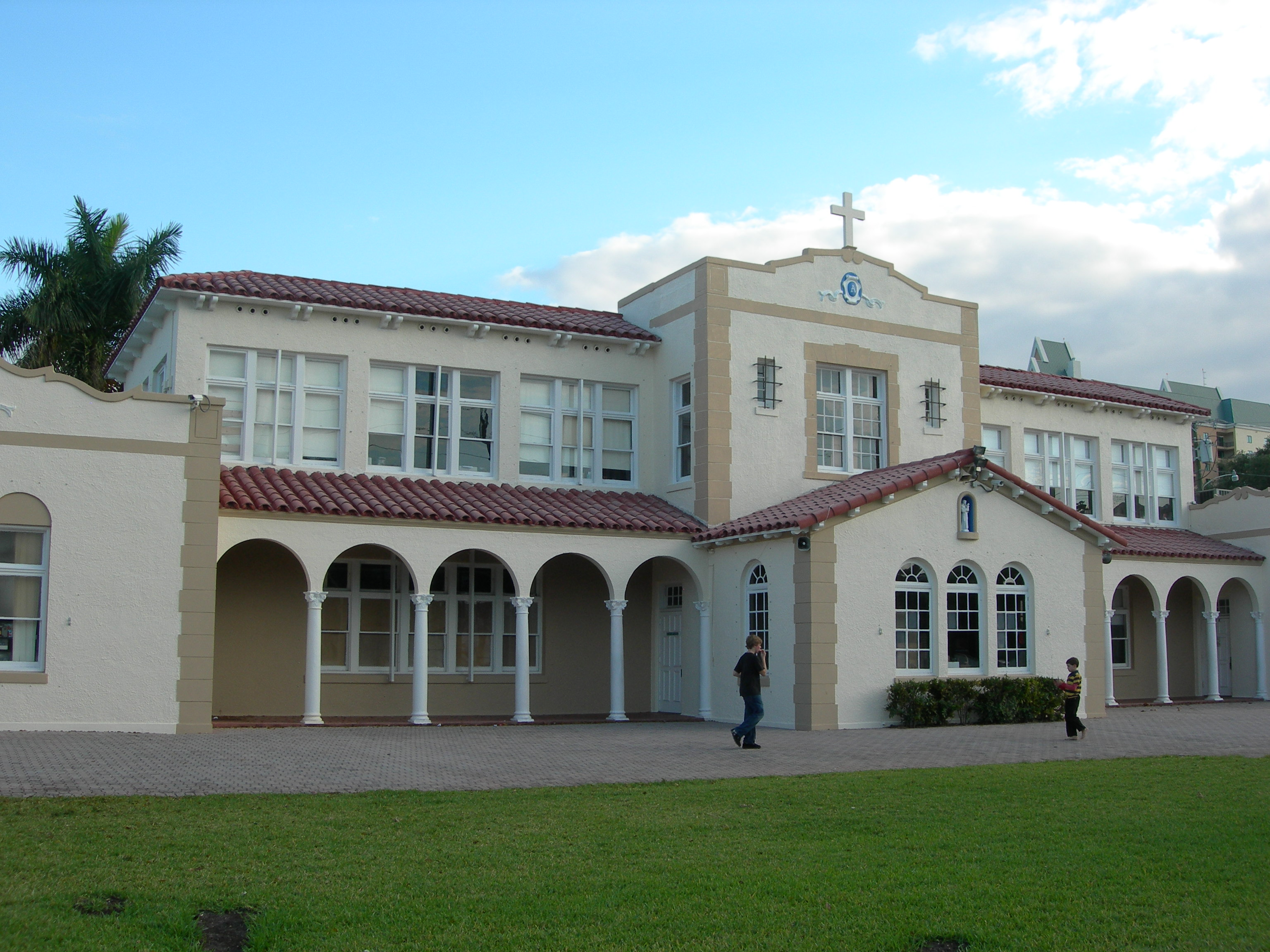
St. Anthony School

Northeast

- Mary Help of Christians (Parkland)
- St. Ambrose (Deerfield Beach)
- St. Andrew (Coral Springs)
- St. Anthony (Fort Lauderdale)
- St. Coleman (Pompano Beach)
- St. Jerome (Fort Lauderdale)

Northwest

- All Saints (Sunrise)
- Our Lady Queen of Martyrs (Fort Lauderdale)
- St. Bonaventure (Davie)
- St. David (Davie)
- St. Gregory (Plantation)
- St. Helen (Lauderdale Lakes - Fort Lauderdale postal address)

South

- Annunciation (West Park) - It is in West Park, though its address is sometimes stated as being in West Hollywood
- Little Flower (Hollywood)
- Nativity (Hollywood)
- St. Bartholomew (Miramar)
- St. Bernadette (Davie - Hollywood postal address)
- St. Mark (Southwest Ranches)

=== Miami-Dade County ===
East

- St. Agnes (Key Biscayne)
- St. Hugh (Coconut Grove, Miami)
- St. Michael the Archangel (Miami)
- St. Patrick (Miami Beach)
- Sts. Peter and Paul (Miami)

Northeast

- Holy Family (North Miami)
- St. James (North Miami)
- St. Lawrence (Ojus, unincorporated area - North Miami Beach address)
- St. Mary Cathedral (Miami)
- St. Rose of Lima (Miami Shores)

Northwest

- Blessed Trinity (Virginia Gardens, near Miami Springs)
- Immaculate Conception (Hialeah)
- Mother of Our Redeemer (unincorporated area, Miami, or Hialeah address)
- Our Lady of the Lakes (Miami Lakes) - It opened in 1986.
- St. John the Apostle (Hialeah)

South

- Mother of Christ (Unincorporated area, Miami address)
- Our Lady of Lourdes Parish School (The Hammocks, Unincorporated area, Miami address) - Established in 1997.
- Our Lady of the Holy Rosary-St. Richard (Cutler Bay, address is sometimes stated as a Miami address) - Previously known as Our Lady of the Holy Rosary, previously in Cutler Ridge CDP (Perrine address).
- St. John Neumann (Kendall, Unincorporated area, Miami address) - Established in 1981.
- St. Louis Covenant (Pinecrest)

Southeast

- Epiphany (Ponce-Davis, Unincorporated area, Miami address)
- St. Theresa (Coral Gables)
- St. Thomas the Apostle (Glenvar Heights, Unincorporated area, Miami address)
- St. Timothy (Westwood Lakes, Unincorporated area, Miami address)

West

- Good Shepherd (Kendale Lakes, unincorporated area, Miami address)
- St. Agatha (University Park, Unincorporated area, Miami address)
- St. Brendan (Westchester, Unincorporated area, Miami address)
- St. Kevin (Tamiami, unincorporated area, Miami address) - Opened in August 1980.
- Immaculate Conception (Hialeah)

=== Monroe County ===
- Basilica School of St. Mary Star of the Sea (Key West)

== Special education ==
- Marian Center School and Services (Miami Gardens)

== Defunct schools ==
In 2009 the archdiocese closed six schools, which had a combined total of 889 students.

Closed

- Archbishop Curley-Notre Dame High School, Miami
- Holy Cross Academy (Florida) (independent)

Grade schools

- Corpus Christi (Miami) - Closed in 2009
- Our Lady of Divine Providence (Fontainebleau CDP, unincorporated area, Miami address) - In proximity to Sweetwater, closed in 2009
- Sacred Heart (Homestead) - Closed in 2009
- Saint Clement (Wilton Manors, Fort Lauderdale address) - Opened in the 1950s and closed in 2009. According to Akilah Johnson of the South Florida Sun Sentinel, area parents indicated that St. Ambrose and St. Jerome's Catholic School would take most of the students who could not go to Saint Clement anymore.
- Saint Elizabeth of Hungary (Pompano Beach) - The church attempted to resolve its debt to the archdiocese by loaning $2.13 million from Bank of America, and the school had $337,000 in debt in 2009, and it ballooned to $1.3 million of debt in the 2009–2010 school year. It closed on June 15, 2010.
- Saint Francis Xavier (Miami) - Closed in 2009
- Saint Joseph (Miami Beach)
- Saint Justin Martyr, Academy of Marine Science (PK-9) (Key Largo)
- Saint Malachy School (Tamarac)
- Saint Monica School (Carol City CDP, later in Miami Gardens)
- Saint Stephen Catholic School (Miramar) - Opened in the 1950s and closed in 2009, with the building rented to a charter school.
