= Holy Innocents Catholic Church (Long Beach) =

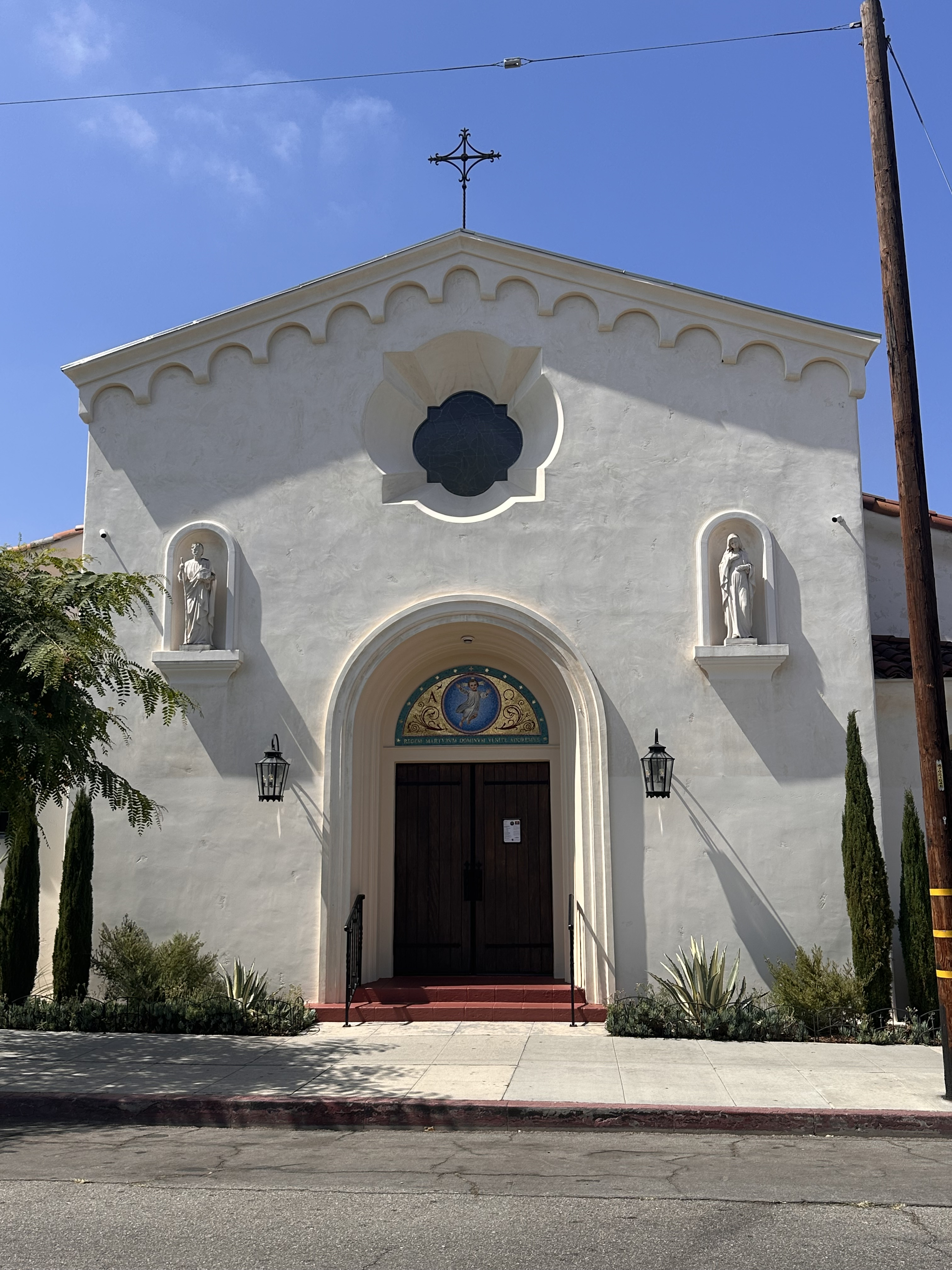
- Holy Innocents Catholic Church
- 33°47′39″N 118°11′04″W
- Location: 425 E 20th Street, Long Beach, California
- Country: United States
- Denomination: Roman Catholic
- Website: lbcatholic.com

History
- Founded: Parish founded in 1923; 103 years ago

Administration
- Division: San Pedro Pastoral Region
- Diocese: Archdiocese of Los Angeles

Clergy
- Archbishop: José Horacio Gómez
- Bishop: Marc Vincent Trudeau
- Pastor: Fr. Peter Irving (2006-present)

Holy Innocents Catholic Church is a Catholic parish in Long Beach, California. It is a historic church in the Archdiocese of Los Angeles.

Located on East 20th Street, Holy Innocents offers ad orientem Masses in English, Spanish, and traditional Latin. Founded in 1923, the parish has been home to several notable figures, including Venerable Mother María Luisa Josefa and Cardinal William Levada.

Holy Innocents School is a Parochial School in the Archdiocese of Los Angeles that serves grades TK-12 and offers a Catholic classical liberal arts education.

== History ==
Holy Innocents was founded on the Feast of Our Lady of Guadalupe on December 12, 1923. It was one of 18 churches established that year in the then-Diocese of Los Angeles-San Diego, the most of any year before or since. The parish is named after the Holy Innocents recounted in the Nativity narrative of the Gospel of Matthew.

In 1927, during a time of religious persecution in Mexico, Mother Luisita and two Carmelite sisters sought refuge in the United States and found their home at Holy Innocents Parish at the direction of Archbishop John Cantwell. In their time in the U.S., the sisters founded the Carmelite Sisters of the Most Sacred Heart of Los Angeles.

Holy Innocents Parish School was founded in 1958 in partnership with the Carmelite Sisters who still support the school today. In 2018, the school transitioned to a Catholic classical liberal arts education model.

In 2011, the church began a major sanctuary renovation by Harrison Design and has seen several improvements and updates since then.

Holy Innocents celebrated its 100th anniversary in 2023 with several Eucharistic processions throughout the year and a special anniversary Mass with Archbishop Jose Gomez in December.

Holy Innocents Parish School was vandalized in February 2026, an event that brought national attention to the parish community.

== Notable Figures ==
=== María Luisa Josefa ===
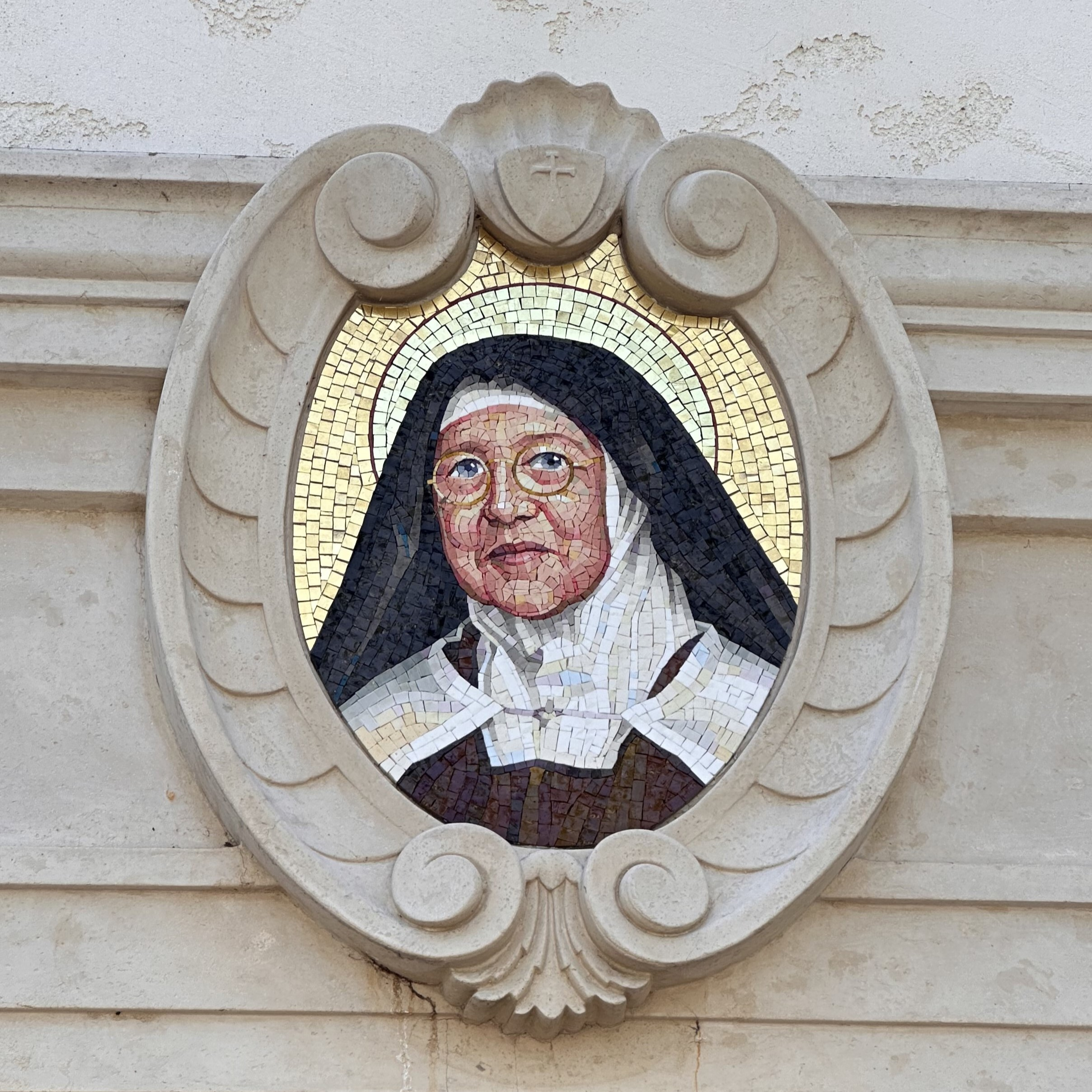
Mother Luisita Mosaic over east entrance of Holy Innocents Church.

María Luisa Josefa of the Most Blessed Sacrament, also called "Mother Luisita" (June 21, 1866 – February 11, 1937) was a Mexican Catholic religious sister who founded the Carmelite Sisters of the Sacred Heart of Mexico and the Carmelite Sisters of the Most Sacred Heart of Los Angeles.

In June 1927, Mother Luisita and two other nuns sought refuge in Los Angeles, California from the religious persecutions in Mexico at that time. That August, she and her companions moved to Long Beach and were welcomed into Holy Innocents Parish by Rev. Francis C. Ott, the Pastor. Additional sisters continued to arrive until there were over 30 present in the Archdiocese of Los Angeles. Carmelite Sisters called Holy Innocents home until September 1929 when they secured an abandoned convent near St. Patrick's parish in Los Angeles. Mother Luisita returned to Mexico permanently in 1930, dying in Guadalajara in 1937.

On July 1, 2000, Pope John Paul II promulgated that María Luisa be called venerable, which means that it has been proven that she practiced heroic virtue.

Today, Carmelite sisters still maintain a presence in the Holy Innocents community, particularly at the school. They provide administrative and staffing support and embody the charism of the order, striving to educate students in the Catholic tradition.

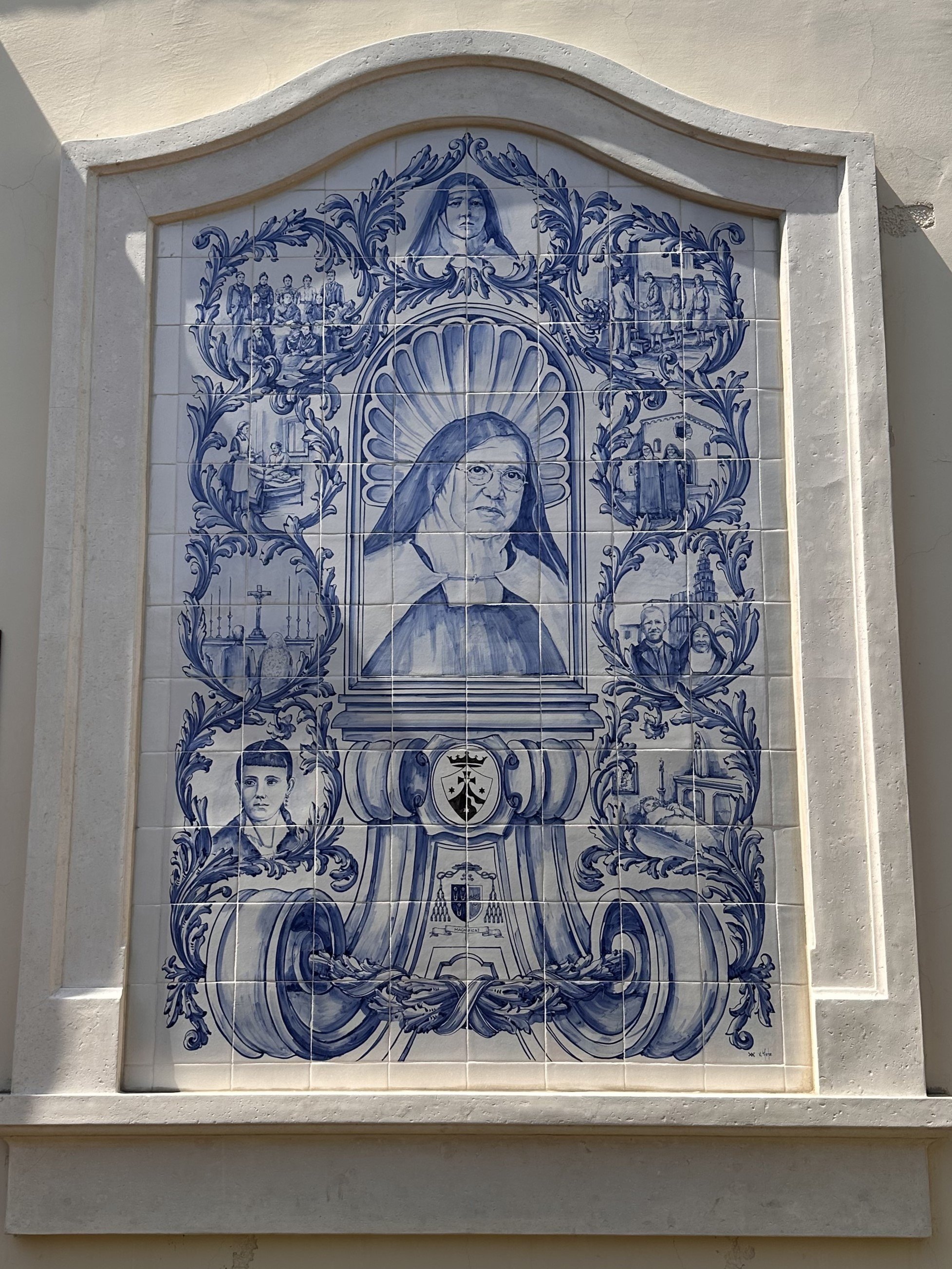
Mother Luisita mural on Holy Innocents rectory.

Mother Luisita is also honored through several exterior depictions at Holy Innocents Church.

=== Cardinal William Levada ===
Cardinal William Joseph Levada (June 15, 1936 – September 26, 2019) was an American Catholic prelate who was born and raised in Long Beach, California. He was baptized and received his First Communion at Holy Innocents, and served as an altar boy for the parish before his family moved.

Levada was appointed Auxiliary Bishop of Los Angeles in 1983 by Pope John Paul II. In 2005, he was appointed Prefect of the Congregation for the Doctrine of the Faith by Pope Benedict XVI and named a Cardinal the following year.

In December 2013, Cardinal Levada offered Mass at Holy Innocents on Christmas Day. He returned on the Feast of the Holy Innocents to bless the restored baptistery where he had been baptized by Father O'Shea in 1936.

== Pro-Life Ministry ==
Holy Innocents is known for its pro-life ministry, especially the Expectant Mothers Outreach program that was launched by Fr. Peter Irving and several parishioners in 2008. In January 2013, Fr. Peter was recognized with an award for his pro-life work at the Walk For Life West Coast in San Francisco. The ministry's work has also been featured in prominent Catholic media since its inception. According to the parish website, the Expectant Mothers Outreach program has saved 1,760 babies since 2008 (as of June 2026).

A pro-life youth group called "Life Boats" was also launched in 2014.

== Vandalism Incident ==
In February 2026, the Holy Innocents community received national attention after intruders broke into the school and vandalized thousands of dollars worth of items, including a tabernacle, a statue of the Virgin Mary, furniture, and musical equipment.

The U.S. Department of Justice's civil rights division opened an investigation into the crime shortly after the incident. Supporters donated over $150,000 through a GoFundMe campaign to aid in restoration of the school. Several celebrities offered their support of Holy Innocents as well, including Lila Rose, Rob Schneider, and Gabriel Iglesias.

On February 11, 2026, several students and staff members were granted a surprise audience with Pope Leo who gave them and their school a blessing during their visit to the Vatican in Rome.

== See also ==
- San Pedro Pastoral Region
