= MFPS =

MFPS may refer to:

- First-person shooter, a video game
- Mannosylfructose-phosphate synthase, an enzyme
- Franciscan Minims of the Perpetual Help of Mary, (mfPS) a Catholic Religious Order founded in Mexico in 1942 (Mínimas Franciscanas del Perpetuo Socorro de María)
