= Bill Donohoe =

American football player and coach (1904–1972)

- Donohue, c. 1948

No. 9
- Position: Halfback

Personal information
- Born: April 1, 1904; Carnegie, Pennsylvania, U.S.
- Died: October 9, 1972 (aged 68); San Dimas, California, U.S.
- Listed height: 5 ft 9 in (1.75 m)
- Listed weight: 165 lb (75 kg)

Career information
- High school: Edgewood (Pittsburgh, Pennsylvania)
- College: Carnegie Tech

Career history

Playing
- Frankford Yellow Jackets (1927)

Coaching
- Saint Francis (PA) (1928–1929) Head coach; Central Catholic HS (PA) (1932–1944) Head coach; Saint Mary's HS (FL) (1945) Head coach; Carnegie Tech (1946–1948) Head coach; Miami Edison HS (FL) (1949–1953) Backfield coach

Career statistics
- Games: 8
- Stats at Pro Football Reference

William Wilson Donohoe (April 1, 1904 – October 9, 1972), sometimes listed as Bill Donohue, was an American football player and coach. He played college football at the Carnegie Institute of Technology—now known as Carnegie Mellon University—and professionally for the Frankford Yellow Jackets of the National Football League (NFL). Donohoe served as head football coach at Saint Francis College—now known as Saint Francis University—in Loretto, Pennsylvania from 1928 to 1929 and at his alma mater, Carnegie Tech, from 1946 to 1948.

== Early life ==
A native of Carnegie, Pennsylvania, he attended Edgewood High School in Pittsburgh.

== College football ==
Donohoe played college football as a halfback for Carnegie Tech from 1924 to 1926. He led the 1926 Carnegie Tech Tartans football team to a 7–2 record, including a victory over Notre Dame in a game that was ranked by ESPN as the fourth-greatest upset in college football history. He also led the team to a 14–0 victory over intra-city rival Pitt. On his graduation from Carnegie in June 1927, The Pittsburgh Press described him as the "real star" of the team and "one of the greatest of all Carnegie backfield men." In 1946, he was selected as the greatest left halfback in the school's history.

== Professional football ==
In July 1927, Donohoe signed to play professional football in the National Football League (NFL) for the Frankford Yellow Jackets. During Frankford's 1927 season, he played appeared in a total of eight NFL games, three as a starter.

== Coaching career and military service ==
After his playing career ended, Donohue coached the sport at Saint Francis College, Central Catholic High School in Pittsburgh, and St. Mary's High School in Miami. During World War II, Donohoe served in the army.

Donohue returned to Carnegie Tech as head football coach in March 1946. He also served as the school's basketball coach. He resigned from both positions in December 1948. The Carnegie football program won only one game and sustained a 19-game losing streak during Donohoe's three years as head coach.

== Later life ==
Donohoe died in 1972 at age 68 in San Dimas, California.
