= St. Theresa School (Coral Gables, Florida) =

Coordinates: 25.743976°N 80.281584°W

- 2701 Indian Mound Trail; Coral Gables, Florida; United States

Information
- Type: Private
- Religious affiliation: Catholic
- Founded: 1925
- Principal: Sister Rosalie, OCD
- Grades: Pre-K3 through 8th
- Website: http://www.cotlf.org/ https://stscg.org/

St. Theresa School is a private Catholic school located at 2701 Indian Mound Trail, Coral Gables, Florida. It is the parish school for the Church of the Little Flower, and is within the Archdiocese of Miami.

== History ==
In December 1922, the head of the order of the Sisters of St. Joseph, the Reverend Mother Marie Louise, purchased from George Merrick six acres of land on Indian Mound Trail. This location was the highest elevation in the entire city of Coral Gables. Ground was broken in October 1924 for the first unit of the new St. Joseph's Academy and construction was completed in September 1925. The convent was on the third story of the school.

Mother Marie Louise and five other sisters were the first teachers. The St. Joseph's Academy formal opening was September 15, 1925. During the first school year, seventy students enrolled, six of whom were boarders. The first graduating class of thirteen eighth graders and one twelfth grader was on May 28, 1926.

In 1932, St. Joseph's Academy was renamed St. Theresa School. By 1936, there were 450 students and 12 full-time teachers. There was a new kindergarten building in 1947. In 1948, Father Comber had built a separate new convent.

In 1956, school enrollment was 1200. The last high school graduating class was in 1958 and had 42 graduates. The last ninth grade class was in 1959 and the school continues to have eight grades.

The Sisters of St. Joseph had the responsibility for teaching at St. Theresa School until 1987. The Carmelite Sisters of the Most Sacred Heart of Los Angeles assumed that responsibility in 1991. Father Whittaker then converted the convent into a parish administration building. The Carmelite Sisters moved into a new convent located south of Father Comber Hall. As of 2009, there are currently 950 students attending the school from Pre-K through 8th Grade. It is accredited by the Florida Catholic Conference and recognized by the National Council for Private School Accreditation. Sister Caridad, OCD, former principal. In 2012, St. Theresa Catholic School expanded to include three-year-old Pre-kindergarten. In 2016, Sister Rosalie, OCD, returned to the school as principal once again.

== Leadership ==
Below are lists of individuals who have led the school.

=== First Sisters of St. Joseph at the School (1925) ===
- Mother Marie Louise
- Sister Cecilia
- Sister Francis Joseph
- Sister St. Mark
- Sister Monica
- Sister Winfred

=== First Carmelite Sisters of the Most Sacred Heart of Los Angeles at the School (1991) ===
- Sister Genevieve Marie Carvalho
- Sister Marisa Ducote
- Sister Rita Therese Hayden
- Sister Mary Rita Munoz
- Sister Mary Michael Ray

=== Principals ===
- Sister Mary Louise Hughes, SSJ (1925–1933)
- Sister Andrew McLoughlin, SSJ (1933–1934)
- Sister M. Augustine Curry, SSJ (1934–1937)
- Sister M. Norberta Maroney, SSJ (1937–1942)
- Sister M. Fidelis Kneiss, SSJ (1942–1945)
- Sister Anna Marie Chauvin, SSJ (1945–1953)
- Sister Anna Joseph Dignan, SSJ (1953–1959)
- Sister Mary Frederic McMahon, SSJ (1959–1962)
- Sister Louis Bertrand Duggan, SSJ (1962–68)
- Sister Margaret Victor Keller, SSJ (1968–1972)
- Sister Mary David Magee, SSJ (1972–1978)
- Mr. Fernando Villamor (1978–1987)
- Sister Margarite Renuart, OP (1987–1991)
- Sister Genevieve Marie Carvalho, OCD (1991–1993)
- Sister Marisa Ducote, OCD (1993–1995)
- Sister Maureen Cochrane, OCD (1995–2003)
- Sister Mary Kathleen Burns, OCD (2003–2006)
- Sister Rosalie Nagy, OCD (2006–2012)
- Sister Caridad Sandoval, OCD (2012–2016)
- Sister Rosalie Nagy, OCD (2016-to present)

== Notable alumni ==
- Raoul G. Cantero, III - Former Justice of the Florida Supreme Court
- Suki Lopez - Actress, known for Nina on Sesame Street
- Eric Diaz-Padron - Mayor of West Miami
