= Church of the Little Flower (Coral Gables, Florida) =

Coordinates: 25.744169°N 80.281827°W

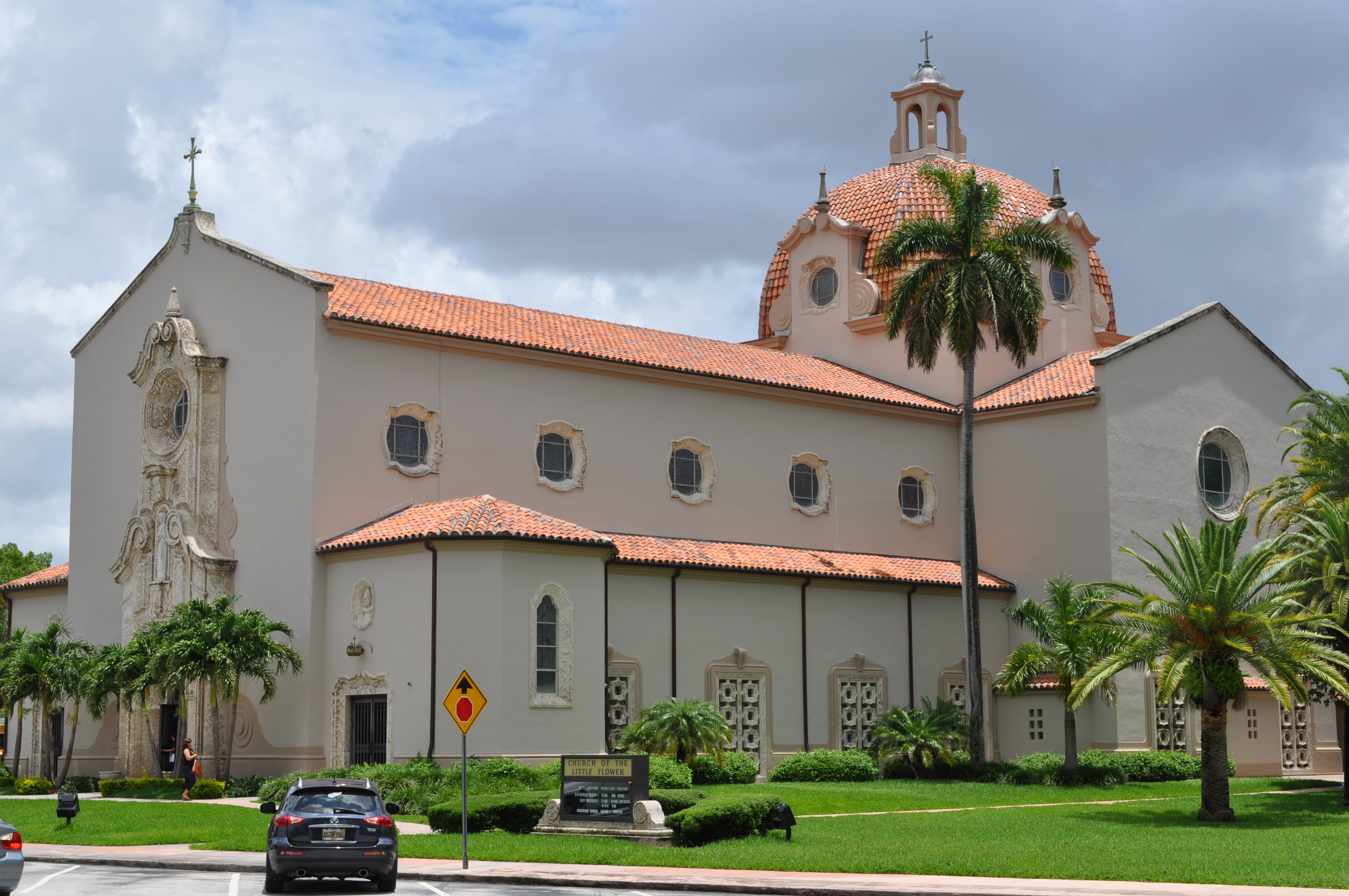
- Church of the Little Flower in Coral Gables, Florida, June 2010
- Church of the Little Flower
- Country: United States of America
- Denomination: Catholic
- Website: www.cotlf.org

Architecture
- Years built: 1951

Specifications
- Capacity: 900

Administration
- Archdiocese: Archdiocese of Miami
- Parish: Little Flower

Clergy
- Archbishop: Thomas Wenski
- Vicar: Andrew Tomonto
- Pastor: Manuel F. Alvarez

The Church of the Little Flower is a Catholic church in Coral Gables, Florida founded in 1926. The church's domed 1951 building was constructed in Spanish Renaissance style, in keeping with the Spanish Colonial Revival for which Coral Gables is noted.

The church members have long been conspicuously upscale. For most of the 20th century, its members were predominantly Irish-American, political liberals who voted the Democratic ticket, but by the end of the century, the majority of members were Cuban-Americans, who are known for being politically conservative and voting Republican. Both Floridian contenders for the 2016 Republican nomination for president, Jeb Bush and Marco Rubio, attend Little Flower with their families. The Rubios were married in the church.

== History ==
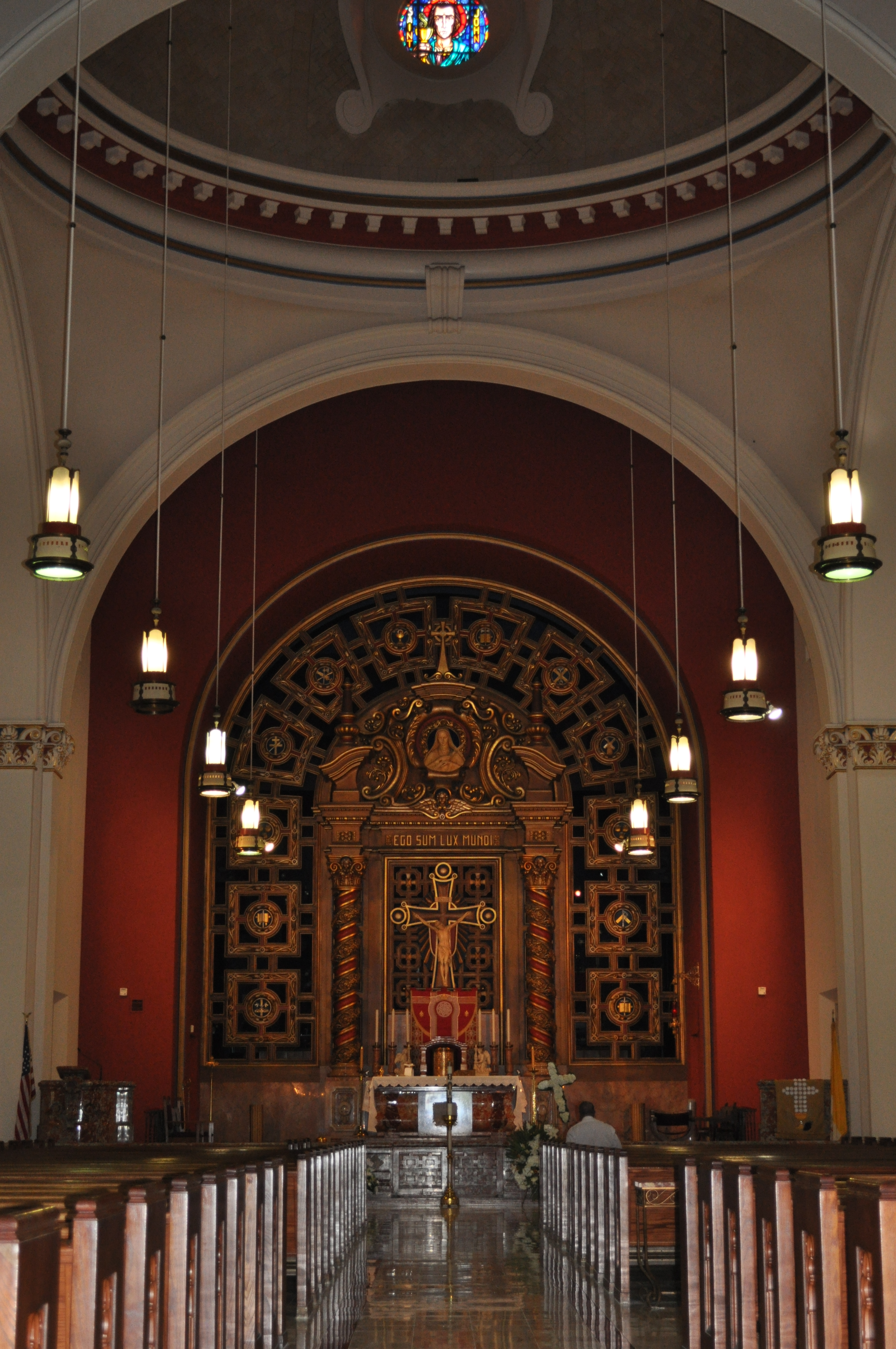
A view of the altar of Church of the Little Flower halfway down the very long nave, reputedly the longest in the Archdiocese of Miami

The church was established in 1926 at the request of a small group of Catholics in the newly established town of Coral Gables. Bishop Patrick J. Barry of St. Augustine – the diocese that included Coral Gables at that time – announced that the new parish would be named in honor of Saint Thérèse of Lisieux, known as "The Little Flower". Masses were celebrated in St. Joseph's Academy, a boarding school established by the Sisters of St. Joseph in 1925, until the temporary church was built in 1928.

Although the Sisters of Saint Joseph had intended to expand their new school, and even to add a junior college, the Great Depression left them so short of funds that they signed the deed to St. Joseph's Academy over to the parish in 1932, and withdrew from Coral Gables. The St. Joseph's Academy building was renamed St. Theresa School and became a parochial school associated with the parish. Originally staffed by the Sisters of St. Joseph, the school has been operated by the Carmelite Sisters of the Most Sacred Heart of Los Angeles since 1991.

The first structure built was the parish center and auditorium, which had a seating capacity of 800. It was formally dedicated in January 1928 by Bishop Patrick J. Barry and functioned as the church until replaced by the present church was built in 1951. In 1987, the 1928 building was renovated and renamed Comber Hall in honor of Rev. Msgr. Thomas P. Comber, Little Flower's first pastor. Also in 1987, the church office was moved from the rectory to the former convent of the Sisters of St. Joseph across the street from the church.

The present church was built in 1951. The stained glass windows were designed by William Haley. It was dedicated by Archbishop Joseph P. Hurley of St. Augustine. The 1951 sanctuary seats 900. Rev. Manuel (Many) Alvarez is the current pastor.

== Cultural shifts ==
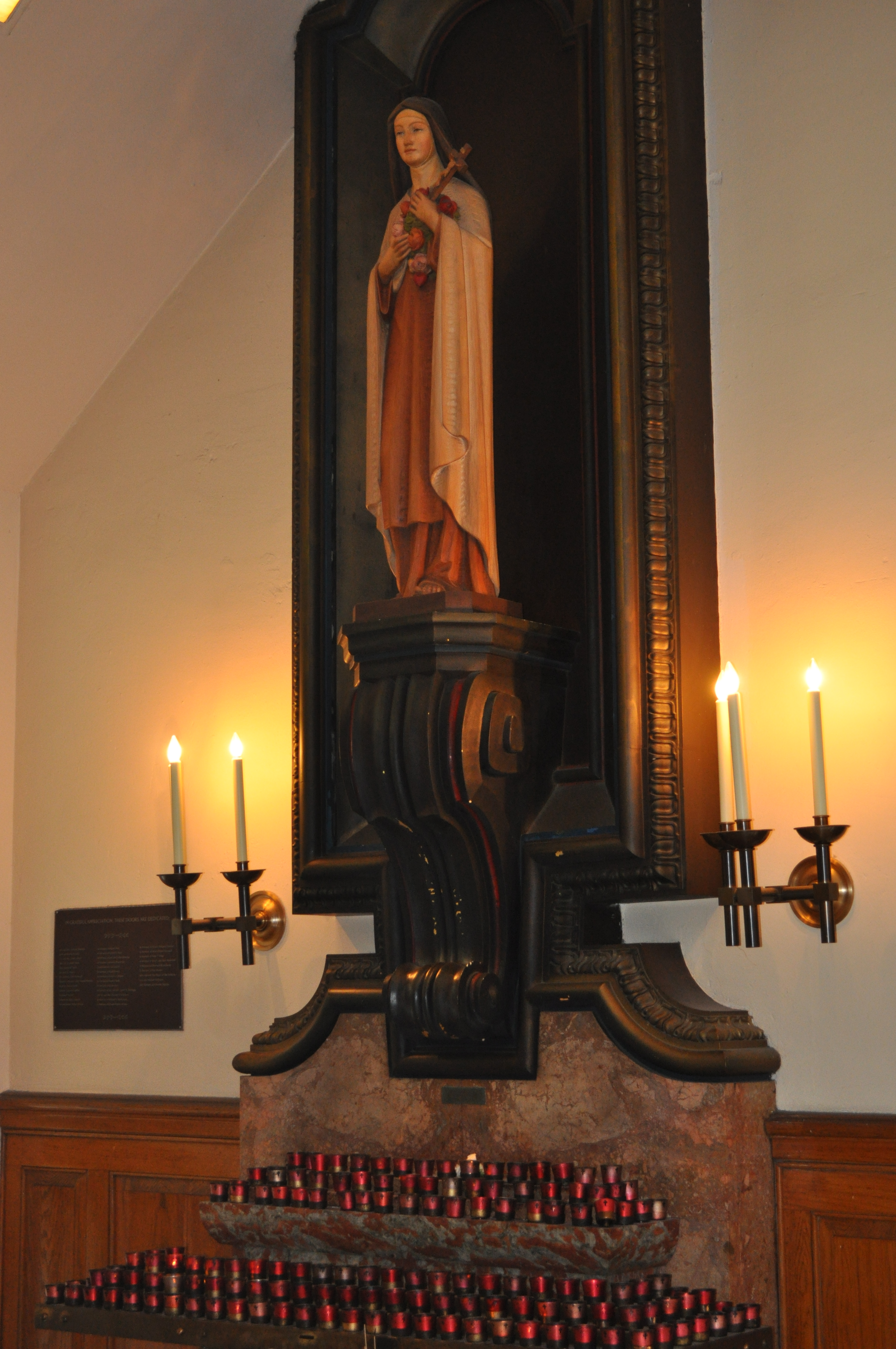
A statue of St. Therese who is also known as the Little Flower

Like Coral Gables itself, the church was built by well-to-do Americans; for most of the 20th century, members were predominantly Irish-American, politically liberal, and supporters of the Democratic Party. Membership was perceived as a "gateway to social advancement." In 1990 a rift developed between the parish priest, Father Kenneth Whittaker, a former Lutheran who had converted to Catholicism, and parishioners who did not attend church regularly. Father Whittaker enforced new rules, including expelling children from the parish's socially and academically prestigious school if their parents failed to attend Mass regularly and on time. The issue escalated, with angry parishioners picketing the church and Father Whittaker refusing to confirm or give First Communion to children whose parents were lax in attending Mass.

The composition of the congregation changed with the arrival of an enormous wave of Cubans who immigrated to Miami after Fidel Castro's 1959 rise to power in the Cuban Revolution. More than half of the parish and more than half of the children in the school were Cuban-American in 2000. The church became known as a center of political conservatism, with many members active in the Republican Party. The membership is "predominantly" Cuban and Cuban-American. Historian Darryl V. Caterine credits their arrival with sparking a "dramatic religious revitalization" of Catholicism in South Florida.

According to historian Caterine, the 1991 arrival of the Carmelite Sisters of the Most Sacred Heart of Los Angeles sparked an intense revival of both Cuban identity and Catholic commitment among the members. Members described the arrival of the Carmelites as a kind of "miracle" in which their community was "transformed" by a renewed spirituality. In 1999 over 40,000 people came to the church to venerate the relics of St. Therese of Lisieux, part of a world tour of the relics to inspire spirituality at the millennium.

== Notable parishioners ==
Jeanette and Marco Rubio were married at Little Flower in 1998. Jeb Bush and Marco Rubio, both candidates for the Presidency, attended Little Flower during the 2016 United States presidential election. Previously, Andy Gomez, a retired Professor of Cuban Studies at the University of Miami and a member of the parish council, called Little Flower "the only Catholic church that has two presidential candidates." Little Flower has also been the site of several funerals for prominent figures connected to the parish, such as Juan Gonzalez, Marta Permuy, and Marlene Kerdyk.

== Church of the Little Flower Priests ==
- Rev. Msgr. Thomas P. Comber (1926–1960)
- Rev. Msgr. Peter J. Reilly (1960–1978)
- Rev. Msgr. William F. McKeever (1978–1982)
- Rev. Msgr. John W. Glorie (1982–1989)
- Rev. Kenneth D. Whittaker (1989–1992)
- Rev. Msgr. Xavier Morrás (1992–2002)
- Rev. Arthur Dennison (2002–2011)
- Rev. Michael W. Davis (2011–2019)
- Rev. Manuel F. Alvarez (2019–present)

== See also ==
- Coral Gables Congregational Church

== Gallery ==
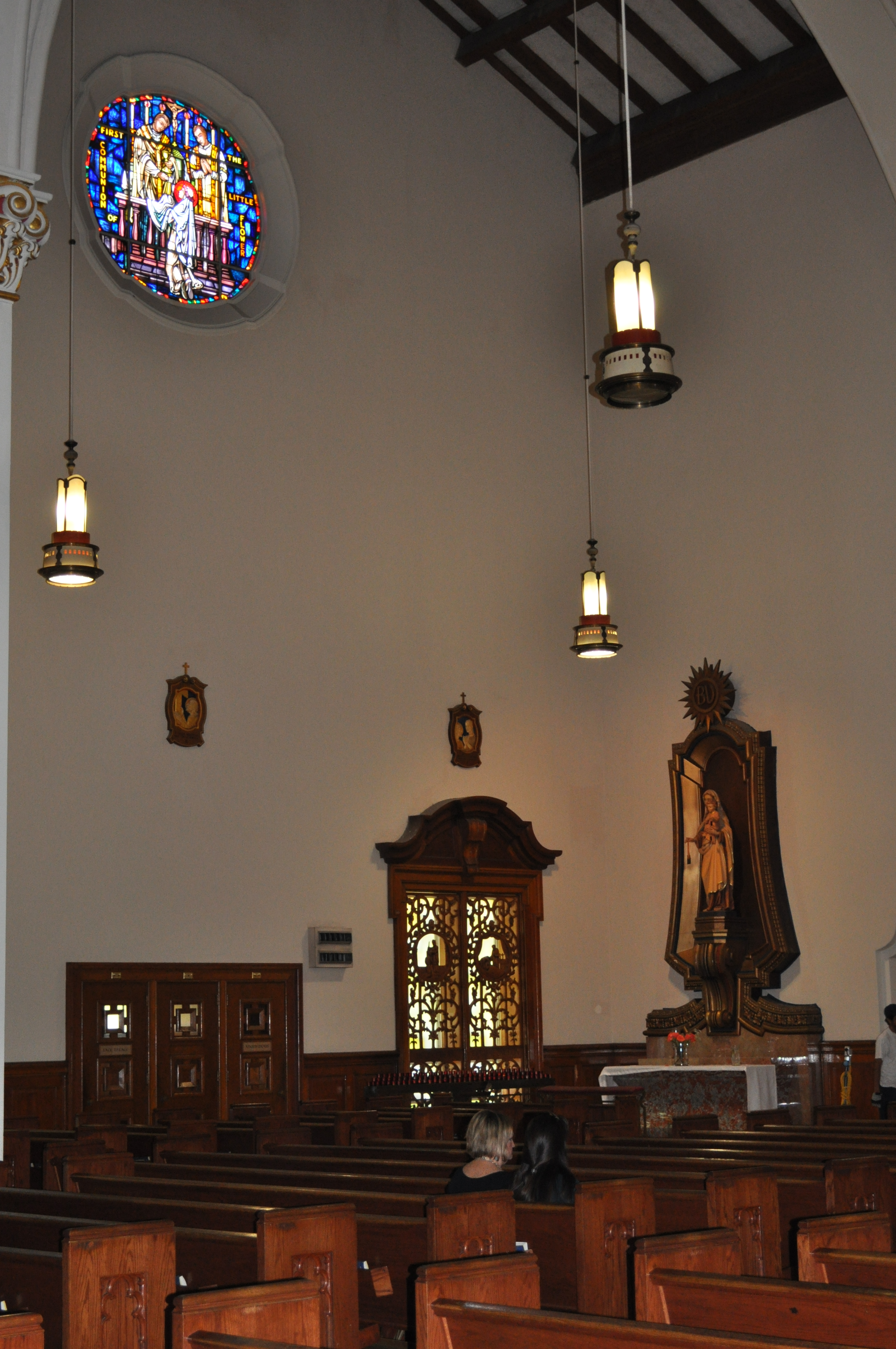
A view of the confessionals and statue of Mary and Jesus just to the side of the main altar

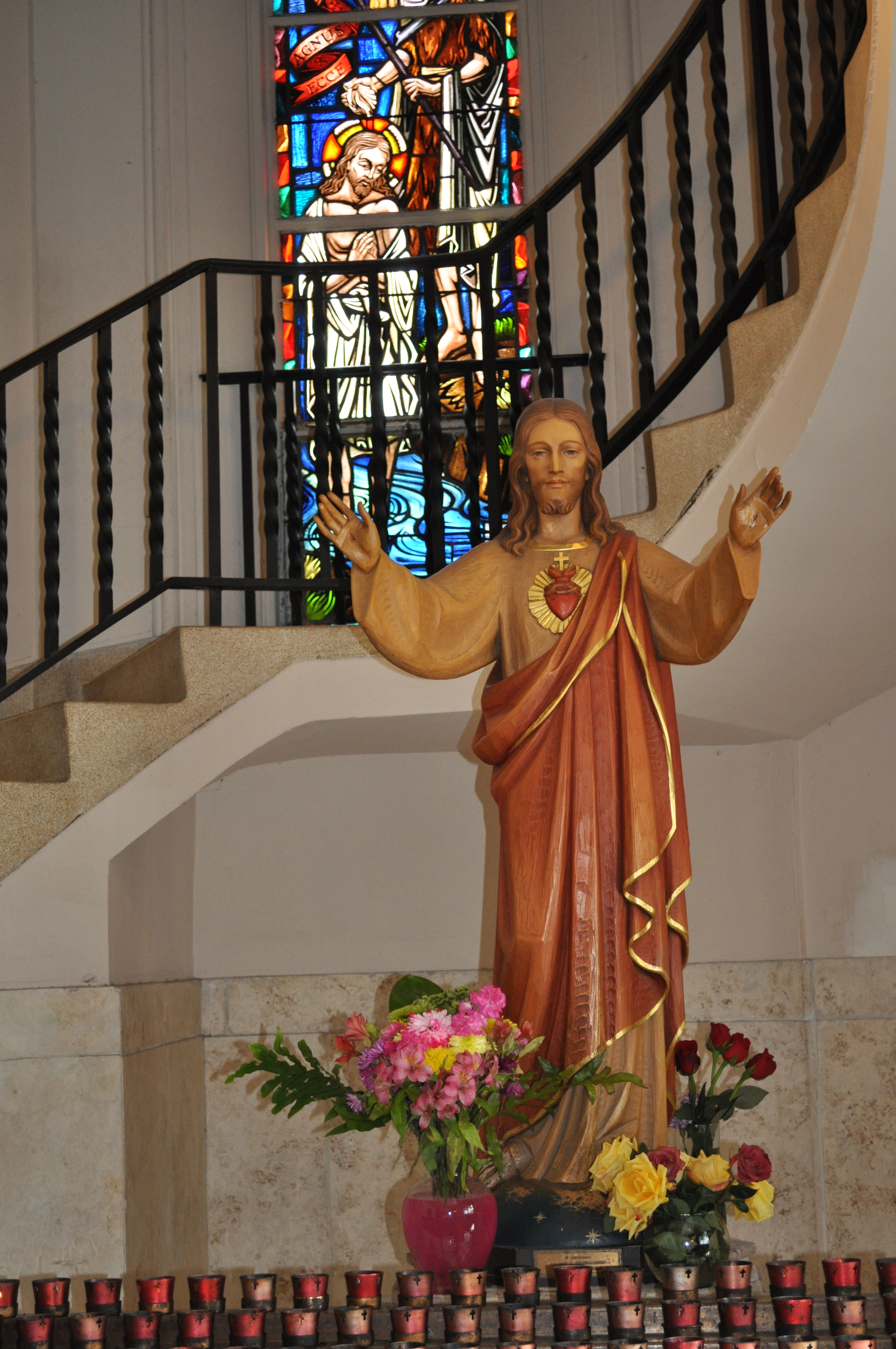
Statue of Jesus and the stairs that lead up to the balcony inside the Church

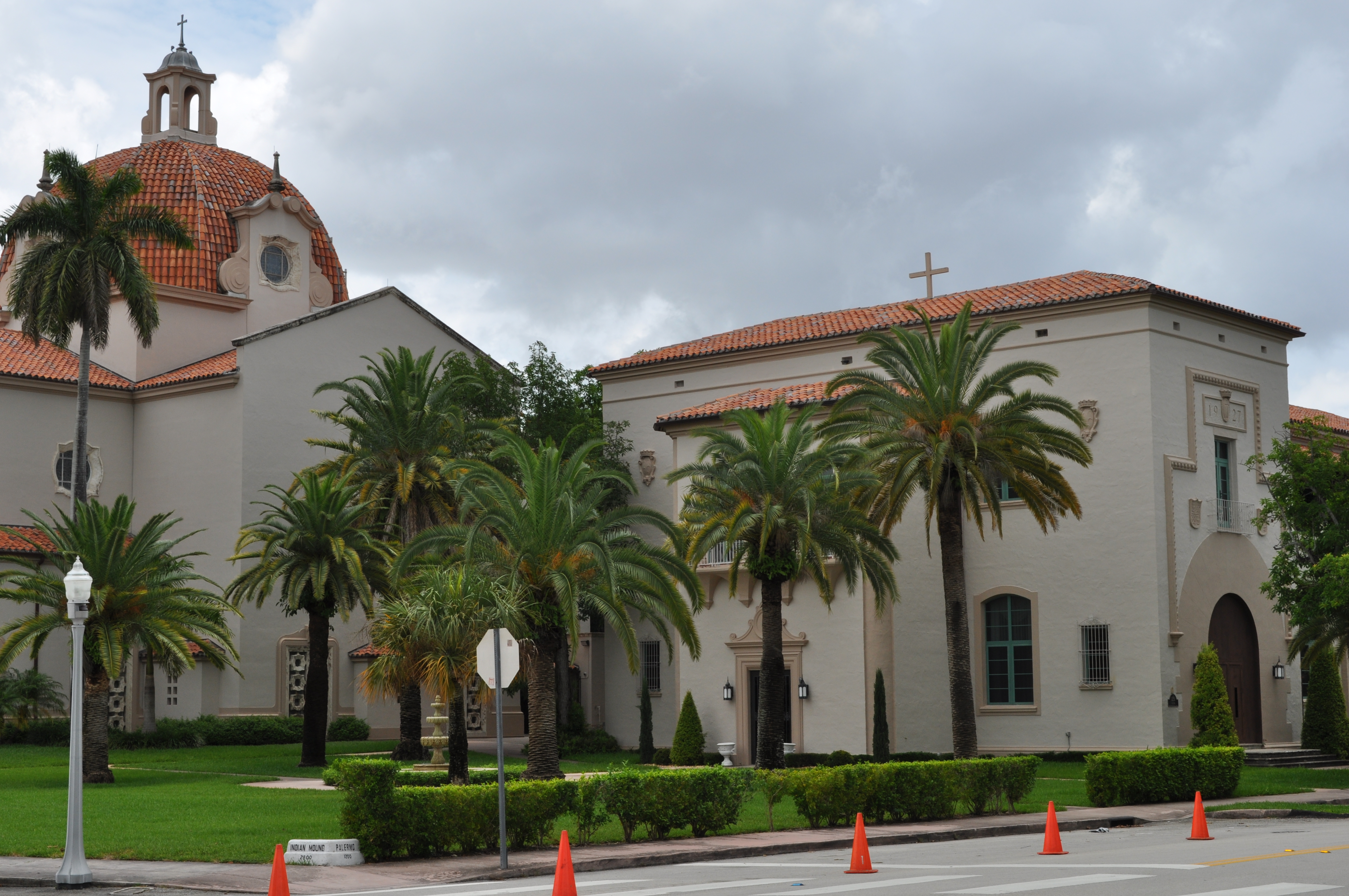
A full view of Comber Hall with partial view of the main church building

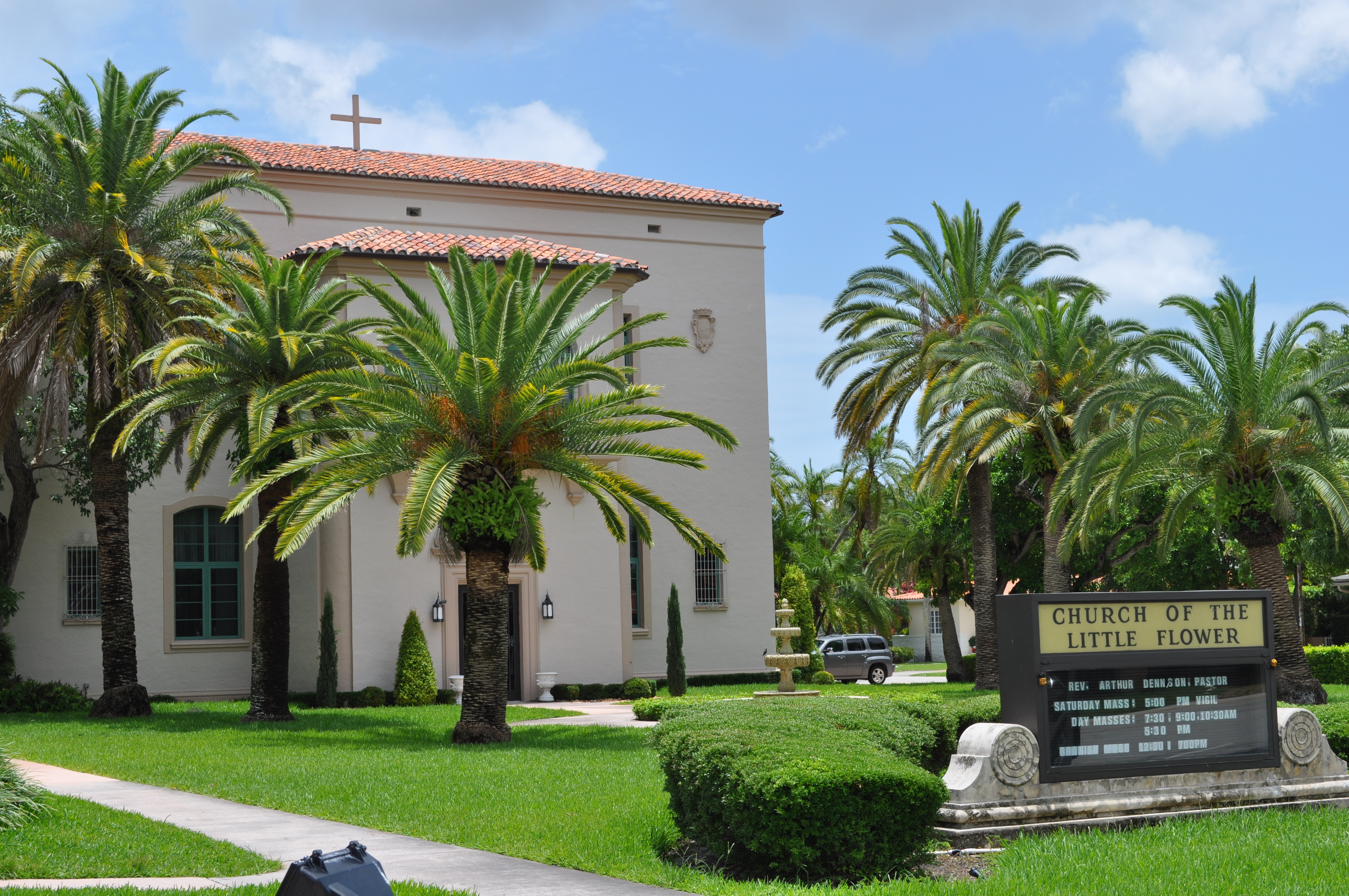
Comber Hall (built 1928)

== Sources ==
- Caterine, Darryl V. (2001). Conservative Catholicism and the Carmelites: Identity, Ethnicity, and Tradition in the Modern Church. Indiana University Press.
