= Franciscan Minims of the Perpetual Help of Mary =

† HOUSE OF ATONEMENT † FRANCISCAN MINIMS OF THE PERPETUAL HELP OF MARY Seal designed and used by: Rev Mother María Concepción of the Nativity and the Perpetual Help of Mary

The Order of Atonement of the Franciscan Minims of the Perpetual Help of Mary (mfPS) is a Roman Catholic active/contemplative religious order distinguished by three branches: the Men's Branch for priests and brothers/friars, the Women's Branch for nuns and the Lay Branch for those of all ages and professions, including the sick, dying, and those children conceived but as yet "unborn" or "pre-born".

The order was founded on June 24, 1942, in Zamora, Michoacan, Mexico by María Concepción of the Nativity and the Perpetual Help of Mary. Called the Order of Atonement/Work of Atonement/the Legion of Victim Souls, "Minims" as "Victim Souls" [whether men or women living the Religious Life or those still living in the world also called laymen or laity] live a life in keeping with their motto of "Charity and Immolation".

Those Franciscan Minims who profess public religious vows receive a religious habit, similar to the Franciscan habit and the Carmelite habit. However, the habit of the Franciscan Minims of the Perpetual Help of Mary has the same colors of tunic and veil (or cowl for the men) as the Blessed Virgin Mary wears in her icon of Perpetual Help, in the icon of Our Lady of Mount Carmel and many other famous icons, paintings and statues of Mary. The Minim tunic is maroon, with a blue veil (or blue cowl for the men). In Mexico City, in the 1970s, the locals nicknamed the nuns: "Los Rojos" (the Red ones). Traditionally, this color was worn by poor Jewish women as it was an earthen color. Wealthier women wore white since they had servants and other means to maintain perfectly white cloth. In art, these colors traditionally signify both the virginity (red) and motherhood (blue) of the Blessed Virgin Mary.

The Order of Atonement of the Franciscan Minims of the Perpetual Help of Mary is not related to or an offshoot of the Minim (religious order) also called the Minimi or Order of Minims, (abbreviated OM) who are members of a Roman Catholic religious order of Franciscan friars founded by Francis of Paola

== Origins ==
The order's establishment began according to the foundress of the order, María Concepción of the Nativity and the Perpetual Help of Mary, when she was still a young girl. María Concepción Zúñiga López writes that Jesus Christ instructed and dictated the rule and constitutions of the order to her.

During and after María Concepción's first Holy Communion (which her mother helped her daughter to make in secret because her father was a 33rd degree Mason and all the Catholic churches and schools in Mexico at that time were closed, and most priests, bishops and religious had to go into in hiding due to the violent slaughter of Catholics by government forces or "Federales" under the Plutarco Elías Calles government), the Eucharistic Jesus spoke to little María Concepción and taught her the faith and how to pray since she had received absolutely no religious education or catechesis at all during this time (1924-1928) of anti-Catholic, anti-Church religious persecution by the atheist Mexican president Plutarco Elías Calles.

Living in a secular household during a time of violent religious persecution in Mexico, María Concepción Zúñiga López had never seen women living in a religious community and did not even know religious life for women existed. At one point in her education, she was learning secretarial skills that include typing and short hand from a group of women who taught in a business school near her home. María Concepción told her spiritual director, a famous Mexican bishop in hiding, that she was drawn to a life of prayer and the bishop explained to her that the women who were teaching her were Carmelites in hiding (they did not wear a religious habit but secular dresses) and actually belonged to a religious congregation, the Carmelite Sisters of the Sacred Heart (Hermanas Carmelitas del Sagrado Corazon) founded in María Concepción's home town of Jalisco by María Luisa Josefa. On June 24, 1927, Luisa Josefa and two other sisters sought refuge in Los Angeles from the religious persecutions in Mexico at that time. This led to the establishment of twelve Carmels in the United States with a novitiate and eventually to the establishment of the Carmelite Sisters of the Most Sacred Heart of Los Angeles a sister-congregation to the foundation in Mexico.

== Apostolate ==
Franciscan Minims of the Perpetual Help of Mary live the Primitive Rule of Saint Francis of Assisi and at their profession make five (5) vows: Poverty, Chastity, Obedience, and two (2) special vows particular to the order, the Vow of Victim to the Divine Justice and Mercy of Christ, and the Vow of Obedience to the Pope. The superior general of the Order of Atonement of the Franciscan Minims of the Perpetual Help of Mary is the Pope, so "the Lord" instructed the foundress of the order regarding the focus of the work of the Franciscan Minims for the Holy See, which included living and preaching the Gospel in word, work and prayer to end schism within the church and to catechize and convert schismatics, apostates, and those who had, in any way, separated themselves from the church and the Vicar of Christ. María Concepción of the Nativity and the Perpetual Help of Mary began all her writings and correspondence with the words: "Long Live the Vicar of Christ". Pope Paul VI was the Vicar of Christ (1963-1978) during the second foundation of the Order of Atonement in Mexico City.

The work of the Apostolate of a Franciscan Minim Nuns begins with their motto "Charity and Immolation" through Perpetual Eucharistic adoration in union with the Eucharistic Victim Heart of Jesus in the Blessed Sacrament. The Minim nuns live a religious life that is both active and contemplative with a special focus on strengthening the family by catechizing Catholic mothers and women living in the world through their frequent religious conferences and retreats for women.

The order which began as a "pious union" (the Code of Canon Law after 1983 uses the term Associations of the faithful) in Zamora, Michoacán, Mexico on June 24, 1942, and given status as a Sodality on October 2, 1942, never ceased to exist canonically even though it was disbanded on October 23, 1951, by Bishop Jose G. Anaya. Canonical status was reaffirmed in Rome under Pope Paul VI on October 30, 1963, after María Concepción made a trip to Rome under the auspices of this same Bishop of Zamora who had earlier disbanded the 1st foundation. With the express authorization of the Sacred Congregation of Religious, dated October 1963, the order was founded a second time in Chilapa, Guerrero, Mexico in January 1964. Again, it received approval as a pious union in Mexico on September 1, 1964, after being placed under the protection of a Mexican Bishop, Fidel de Sta Maria Cortes Perez, whom the Pope introduced to María Concepción while she was in Rome. Pope Paul VI assigned this bishop to assist María Concepción during her trip to Rome in October 1963, a trip she made to ask Pope Paul VI for his help to reestablish the order and then to give the order his full papal approval. Due to the untimely death of Pope Paul the VI and the deaths of several bishops involved with promoting the order, as well as, interference from certain Mexican prelates, including a congregation of priests from Mexico and others working both in Mexico and inside the Vatican who opposed the order's receiving direct papal institution, approval and direction, the status of this request is still pending.

María Concepción of the Nativity and the Perpetual Help of Mary was not disturbed that she might die without seeing the final establishment and approval of the order by the Holy See. In 1963, just prior to the end of her exclaustration María Concepción Zúñiga López wrote in a brief autobiography of her life about the founding of the Order of Atonement, which she handed to Pope Paul VI during her first meeting with him:

That is why, one of the mysteries, the most easily comprehensible — if the expression fits for the human mind — is to teach souls the value of suffering, of their voluntary crucifixion in union with Him, Christ immolated. That is, Victimhood to Divine Justice. And here again I emphasize and urge very fervently, pleading and asking for the approbation of the Order of Atonement, so that being spread all over the world, it may spread, on its part, that devotion that will save the world on the day of final judgment.

And if, so that this might be, it would be better that I were not on earth, so that the immense joy of seeing that ideal realized might not detract from the glory of God or the good of my soul, I believe that if Your Holiness were to ask God to take me, He would do so. For being then with Him, there would be no danger of vanity and everything would be for His greater glory.

— María Concepción Zúñiga López, My Best Book (October 3, 1963) translated from the Spanish by Sor San Andres

María Concepción of the Nativity and the Perpetual Help of Mary died on October 15, the Feast of Saint Teresa of Jesus, in 1979.
