= María Concepción of the Nativity and the Perpetual Help of Mary =

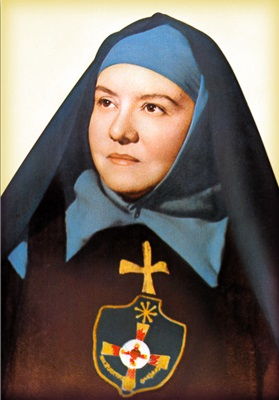
María Concepción of the Nativity and the Perpetual Help of Mary, mfPS (ca. 1942)

María Concepción Zúñiga López (1914—1979), religious name María Concepción of the Nativity and the Perpetual Help of Mary, was the foundress of the Franciscan Minims of the Perpetual Help of Mary (mfPS) which she founded on June 24, 1942, in Zamora, Michoacan, Mexico.

== Early life ==
Born María Concepción Zúñiga López, María Concepción states that when she was still a young girl, Jesus Christ instructed and dictated the Rule and Constitutions of the Order to her.

During and after María Concepción's First Holy Communion (which her mother helped her daughter to make in secret because her father was a 33rd degree Mason and all the Catholic churches and schools in Mexico at that time were closed, and most priests, bishops and Religious had to go into in hiding due to the violent slaughter of Catholics by government forces or "Federales" under the Calles government) the Real Presence of Jesus in the Eucharist spoke to little María Concepción and taught her the Faith and how to pray since she had received absolutely no religious education or catechesis at all during this time (1924-1928) of anti-Catholic, anti-Church religious persecution throughout Mexico by the atheist Mexican president Plutarco Elías Calles.

Living in a secular household during a time of violent religious persecution in Mexico, María Concepción Zúñiga López had never seen women living in a Religious community and did not even know Religious Life for women existed. At one point in her education, she was learning secretarial skills that include typing and short hand from a group of women who taught in a business school near her home. María Concepción told her spiritual director, a famous Mexican bishop in hiding, that she was drawn to a life of prayer and the bishop explained to her that the women who were teaching her were Carmelites in hiding (they did not wear a Religious habit but secular dresses) and actually belonged to a Religious Congregation (Catholic), the Carmelite Sisters of the Sacred Heart (Hermanas Carmelitas del Sagrado Corazon) founded in María Concepción's home town of Jalisco by Venerable Mother María Luisa Josefa of the Most Blessed Sacrament.

== Foundation of the Franciscan Minims ==
María Concepción Zúñiga López of the Nativity and the Perpetual Help of Mary, mfPS
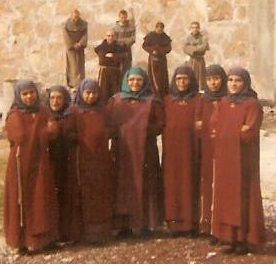
- Mother María Concepción with the nuns and friars of the Franciscan Minims, Christmas 1971

Personal life
- Born: María Concepción Zúñiga López; 8 December 1914 Jalisco, Mexico
- Died: 15 October 1979 (aged 64) Mexico City DF, Mexico

Religious life
- Religion: Roman Catholic
- Order: Franciscan Minims of the Perpetual Help of Mary

Senior posting
- Period in office: 1942–1979

María Concepción held that the work of the Apostolate of a Franciscan Minim nun begins with their motto "charity and immolation" through perpetual eucharistic adoration in union with the Eucharistic victim heart of Jesus in the Blessed Sacrament.

The congregation began as a pious union (the Code of Canon Law after 1983 uses the term Associations of the faithful) in Zamora, Michoacán, Mexico on June 24, 1942, and given status as a sodality on October 2, 1942, never ceased to exist canonically even though it was disbanded on October 23, 1951, by Bishop Jose G. Anaya. Canonical status was reaffirmed in Rome under Pope Paul VI on October 30, 1963, after Mother María Concepción travelled to Rome under the auspices of the same Bishop of Zamora who had earlier disbanded the first foundation. With the express authorization of the Sacred Congregation of Religious, dated October 1963, the Order was founded a second time in Chilapa, Guerrero, Mexico in January 1964. Again, it received approval as a pious union in Mexico on September 1, 1964, after being placed under the protection of Bishop Fidel de Sta Maria Cortes Perez. Pope Paul VI assigned him to assist the foundress during a visit to Rome in October 1963 to ask Pope Paul VI for his help to re-establish the congregation and to give it his papal approval. Following the death of Pope Paul VI and of several bishops involved with promoting the congregation, and the intervention of some prelates who opposed the congregation receiving direct Papal institution, the status of this request is still pending.

Mother María Concepción died on October 15, the Feast of Saint Teresa of Avila, in 1979.
