= High Pines, Florida =

Unincorporated community in Florida, United States

- Unincorporated community
- Location within Florida Location within the United States
- Coordinates: 25°42′03″N 80°16′52″W
- Country: United States
- State: Florida
- County: Miami-Dade

Government
  - Governing body: Miami-Dade County
  - Mayor: Daniella Levine Cava
- Time zone: UTC-5 (Eastern (EST))
  - Summer (DST): UTC-4 (EDT)
- ZIP code: 33143
- Area codes: 305, 786

High Pines is an unincorporated community in Miami-Dade County, Florida.

== Geography ==
High Pines is bounded on the north by Coral Gables at Southwest 72nd Street, on the west by the city of South Miami at Southwest 57th Avenue, on the east by the unincorporated community of Ponce-Davis at School House Road, and on the south by Ponce-Davis at Southwest 80th Street.

High Pines is predominantly residential; however, there is a small commercial district along Southwest 57th Avenue.

== History ==
In 2018, the neighboring city of Coral Gables, Florida made a proposal to annex High Pines and Ponce-Davis. In 2019, Miami-Dade County rejected this proposal along with a similar proposal to annex the unincorporated community of Little Gables.
