= Jeanette Dousdebes Rubio =

American former cheerleader (born 1973)

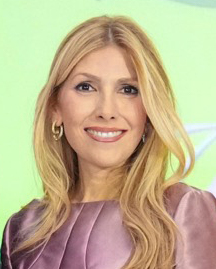
- Rubio in 2025
- Born: Jeanette Christina Dousdebes; December 5, 1973 (age 52); Miami, Florida, U.S.
- Education: Miami Dade College
- Political party: Republican
- Spouse: Marco Rubio (m. 1998)
- Children: 4

Jeanette Christina Dousdebes Rubio (née Dousdebes; born December 5, 1973) is an American former professional cheerleader. She is married to United States Secretary of State and former senator Marco Rubio.

== Early life and education ==
Jeanette was born in Florida, to Colombian immigrants. When she was six, her parents divorced. Jeanette was raised Roman Catholic and attended South Miami High School. She met her future husband, Marco Rubio, at a neighborhood party, when she was 17 and he was 19. After graduating from high school, she attended Miami Dade College.

Before her marriage, she worked as a bank teller. In 1997, she became a member of the Miami Dolphins American football team's cheerleaders. Her sister, Adriana Dousdebes, was also a cheerleader for the Dolphins. Jeanette was featured in the Miami Dolphins Cheerleaders' first swimsuit calendar. It was during her time as a cheerleader that Jeanette Dousdebes and Marco Rubio, who were only slightly acquainted in high school, reacquainted and began to date.

When the Rubios were first married, she enrolled in a course of study in fashion design at International Fine Arts College, but did not complete her studies and was full-time mother of four children.

During her husband's service in the Florida legislature, Rubio lived with the children near Miami, traveling to Tallahassee to be with her husband as often as she could.

== Political involvement ==
During the race for speaker, she was enlisted by her husband to manage the political action committees he used to support his travel and consultants, a decision he later described as a "disaster" as it resulted in confusion on financial transactions related to travel and expenses, due to "inexperience, sloppiness and a blur of paperwork" according to a report by the Tampa Bay Times.

Unlike many spouses of presidential candidates, Rubio did not make campaign speeches.

Rubio's campaign spotlighted her career as a Dolphins cheerleader in a television ad broadcast shortly before the Iowa caucuses, the New Hampshire primary, and the NFL playoffs.

The Washington Post reported that Rubio is a part-time employee of the Norman Braman Family 2011 Charitable Foundation, which is also a financial backer of her husband Marco Rubio, and likely to commit as much as US$10 million to pro-Rubio PACs.

== Personal life ==
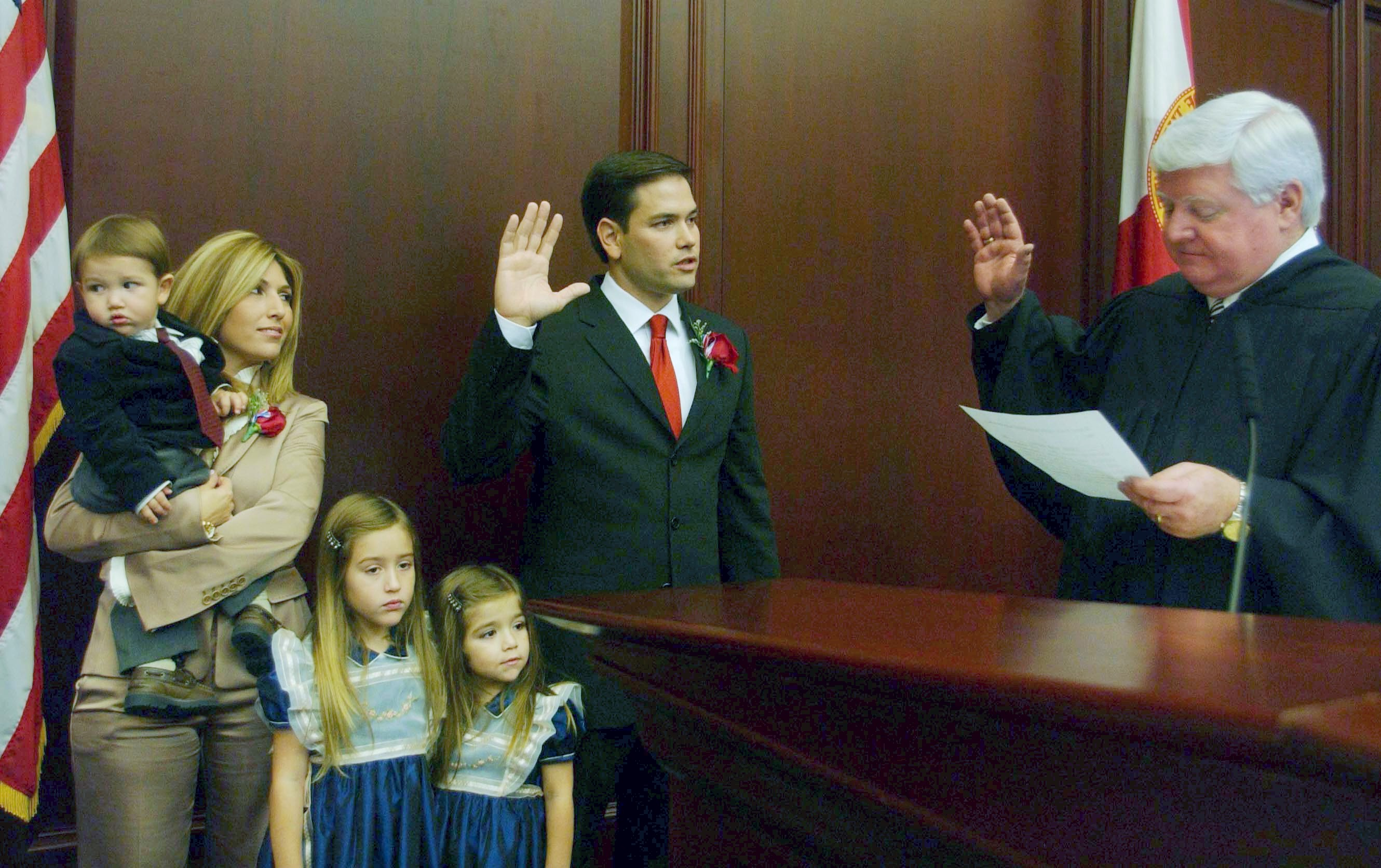
Florida House Speaker Rubio, Miami, officially sworn into office by Judge R. Fred Lewis, with Jeanette and the three oldest children at his side, in 2006

The Rubios live in West Miami, Florida, close to Jeanette's three sisters.

The Rubios had a Catholic wedding on October 27, 1998, at the Church of the Little Flower in Coral Gables, Florida, and have four children: Daniella, Amanda, Dominick, and Anthony.

Rubio and her family regularly attend both Roman Catholic Mass at Church of the Little Flower and Protestant worship services at Christ Fellowship, an Evangelical megachurch aligned with the Southern Baptist Convention. She hosts a weekly Bible study class in her home.
