= Mannosylfructose-phosphate phosphatase =

Identifiers
- EC no.: 3.1.3.79

Databases
- IntEnz: IntEnz view
- BRENDA: BRENDA entry
- ExPASy: NiceZyme view
- KEGG: KEGG entry
- MetaCyc: metabolic pathway
- PRIAM: profile
- PDB structures: RCSB PDB PDBe PDBsum
Search
- PMC: articles
- PubMed: articles
- NCBI: proteins

Mannosylfructose-phosphate phosphatase (EC 3.1.3.79, mannosylfructose-6-phosphate phosphatase, MFPP) is an enzyme with systematic name β-D-ructofuranosyl-α-D-mannopyranoside-6^{F}-phosphate phosphohydrolase. It catalyses the following chemical reaction which removes a phosphate group (P_{i}) by hydrolysis:

β-D-fructofuranosyl-α-D-mannopyranoside 6F-phosphate
H_{2}O
P_{i}
β-D-fructofuranosyl-α-D-mannopyranoside

This enzyme, from the soil proteobacterium and plant pathogen Agrobacterium tumefaciens strain C58, requires magnesium, Mg^{2+}, for activity. The starting material is produced from GDP-mannose and fructose 6-phosphate by the enzyme mannosylfructose-phosphate synthase and the product is an osmolyte which protexts the organism from osmotic shock.
