= Ponce-Davis, Florida =

Unincorporated community in Florida, United States

- Unincorporated community
- Location within Florida Location within the United States
- Coordinates: 25.694°N 80.274°W
- Country: United States
- State: Florida
- County: Miami-Dade

Government
  - Governing body: Miami-Dade County
  - Mayor: Daniella Levine Cava
- Time zone: UTC-5 (Eastern (EST))
  - Summer (DST): UTC-4 (EDT)
- ZIP code: 33143
- Area codes: 305, 786

Ponce-Davis is an unincorporated community in Miami-Dade County, Florida, United States.

The community is named for Ponce De Leon Road (Southwest 49th Avenue), the primary north-south road in the community, and for Davis Drive (Southwest 80th Street), the primary east-west road.

== Geography ==
Ponce-Davis borders Coral Gables to the north, east, and south, the city of South Miami to the west, and the unincorporated community of High Pines to the northwest.

Ponce-Davis is mostly residential and consists mainly of single-family homes; there are no commercial districts within the community.

== History ==
In 2018, the neighboring city of Coral Gables, Florida made a proposal to annex Ponce-Davis and High Pines. In 2019 Miami-Dade County rejected this proposal along with a similar proposal to annex the unincorporated community of Little Gables.

== Education ==
Ponce-Davis is home to Our Lady of Lourdes Academy, a Catholic all-girls high school.
