= Little Gables, Florida =

Unincorporated community in Florida, United States

- Unincorporated community
- Location within Florida Location within the United States
- Coordinates: 25.760351°N 80.2705203°W
- Country: United States
- State: Florida
- County: Miami-Dade

Government
  - Governing body: Miami-Dade County
  - Mayor: Daniella Levine Cava
- Time zone: UTC-5 (Eastern (EST))
  - Summer (DST): UTC-4 (EDT)
- ZIP code: 33134
- Area codes: 305, 786

Little Gables is an unincorporated community in Miami-Dade County, Florida. The name "Little Gables" comes from the community being located between the cities of Coral Gables and Miami.

== Geography ==
Little Gables is bordered by Coral Gables on the east, west and south, and by the Miami neighborhood of Flagami on the north.

== History ==
There have been proposals for Coral Gables to annex Little Gables for several decades prior to 2018. An attempt at annexation was made in 2018-19 which ultimately failed due to the lack of alternative affordable housing for residents of a trailer park in the community which Coral Gables wished to redevelop.

== Demographics ==
As of 2018, Little Gables, High Pines and Ponce-Davis (all unincorporated areas which Coral Gables was attempting to annex) had a combined population of about 5,490.
