= Paul Hazel =

American football player (born 1990)

No. 96, 71, 98
- Position: Defensive lineman

Personal information
- Born: May 4, 1990 (age 36); Miami, Florida, U.S.
- Listed height: 6 ft 5 in (1.96 m)
- Listed weight: 227 lb (103 kg)

Career information
- High school: South (Miami)
- College: Western Michigan
- NFL draft: 2013: undrafted

Career history
- Jacksonville Jaguars (2013)*; Cleveland Browns (2013); Houston Texans (2014)*; New York Giants (2014); Hamilton Tiger-Cats (2015); Toronto Argonauts (2016); Ottawa Redblacks (2016–2017)
- * Offseason or practice squad member only

Awards and highlights
- Grey Cup champion (2016)

Career NFL statistics
- Total tackles: 3
- Stats at Pro Football Reference

Paul Hazel (born May 4, 1990) is an American former professional football player who was a defensive end in the National Football League (NFL) and Canadian Football League (CFL). He was a member of the Ottawa Redblacks in the CFL. He played college football for the Western Michigan Broncos where he played 49 games with 19 starts and posted 104 tackles, 24 tackles for loss, 17.5 sacks, seven forced fumbles, and one fumble recovery.

== Professional career ==
=== NFL ===
Unselected in the 2013 NFL draft, Hazel first signed with the Jacksonville Jaguars. After being waived, he was claimed by the Cleveland Browns He signed with the Houston Texans after becoming a free agent at the end of the 2013 season.

=== CFL ===
On June 1, 2015, the Hamilton Tiger-Cats of the CFL announced the signing of Paul Hazel at the beginning of their training camp. On June 21, 2015, he was released by the Tiger-Cats.

Hazel signed with the Ottawa Redblacks on July 28, 2016. Hazel played in 4 games for the Redblacks in 2016, recording 2 defensive tackles. He was released by the Redblacks on May 1, 2017, as they trimmed their roster down to 75 players in preparation for the 2017 season.
