= Fernanza Burgess =

American football player (1960–2012)

No. 82, 46
- Position: Wide receiver

Personal information
- Born: March 6, 1960; Miami, Florida, U.S.
- Died: January 27, 2012 (aged 51); Miami, Florida, U.S.
- Listed height: 6 ft 1 in (1.85 m)
- Listed weight: 210 lb (95 kg)

Career information
- High school: Miami (FL) South
- College: Morris Brown
- NFL draft: 1983: undrafted

Career history
- St. Louis Cardinals (1983)*; Miami Dolphins (1984); New York Jets (1984)
- * Offseason or practice squad member only

Career NFL statistics
- Games played: 14
- Stats at Pro Football Reference

Fernanza Burgess (March 6, 1960 – January 27, 2012) was an American professional football wide receiver. He played in the National Football League (NFL) for the Miami Dolphins and New York Jets in 1984.
