= Cambridge Lawns =

Cambridge Lawns is a residential neighbourhood near the University of Miami. It is in close proximity to the Broad Canal, a waterway in the City of South Miami, Miami-Dade County, Florida, United States. Cambridge Lawns was originally developed in the mid-1920s and sits 0.7 miles from the University of Miami. The lawns were inspired by the college lawns and riverside parks at Cambridge University in England.

The neighbourhood is made up of Cambridge Lawns Historic District and adjacent homes in the Cambridge Lawns subdivision. On the west side of Cambridge Lawns sits Brewer Park and the widening of the Brewer Canal. The east border is marked by SW 60th Avenue, the north by Miller Drive, and the south by SW 58th Street. The neighbourhood's first streets were originally named after U.S. universities - SW 57th Street was named 'Harvard Avenue', SW 57th Drive was named 'Princeton Boulevard' and SW 58th Street was named 'Clemson Avenue.' The Broad Canal is a notable element of the Cambridge Lawns neighbourhood.

It is lined with Australian pines (Casuarina spp.), as well as native gumbo-limbo (Bursera simaruba), West Indian mahoganies (Swietenia mahagoni), voluminous tropical almonds (Terminalia catappa) and other tropical and native vegetation. This flora provides a habitat to local wildlife, including the bird life that has placed Brewer Park on the Audubon Society's list of prime locations for birdwatching in the Miami area.

Broad Canal, which was cleaned as part of a public works improvements project in 2004-05, flows south into Twin Lakes Canal. It then flows past Fuchs Park to empty at Gulliver Preparatory School into the Snapper Creek Canal, a freshwater drainage conduit for the Everglades system that flows several miles further south and enters Biscayne Bay at a point just south of Matheson Hammock Park (25.675771°N 80.264225°W).

Brewer Park, named in 1956 after longtime local resident George Brewer, is another key attraction in Cambridge Lawns. In 2005, the City commissioner and then-Mayor Mary Scott Russell announced the availability of funds for the Brewer Park Improvements project, which was completed in 2007.

In 1928, developers had completed 30 of the first homes in the neighbourhood. These houses are referred to by many as "cottages", due to their relatively modest size. Popular architectural designs in the neighbourhood include Mock Tudor and Mediterranean Revival Style architecture. The Tudor Revival homes are generally 1½ stories, recognisable by their gabled facades and chimneys. Mediterranean Revival homes have textured or smooth stucco surfaces, ornamental window and door frames and barrel-tile roofs.In 1926, the Great Miami Hurricane brought an end to the 1920s South Florida real estate boom. The Great Depression and World War II kept the local real estate market depressed for more than two decades. Following the war, student enrolment at the nearby University of Miami climb above 10,000, and demand for houses in the area grew. Developers launched a second phase of homebuilding on larger lots in the Cambridge Lawns subdivision to the south of Broad Canal. The newer homes, built in the 1950s, are variations on the Mid-century modern architectural style. The houses are situated on larger properties with more square footage of construction than the homes north of the canal. They feature horizontal lines, louvered windows and open-plan living space.
