= Miami Conservatory =

Dance school in Florida, United States

Coordinates: 25.7034°N 80.2878°W

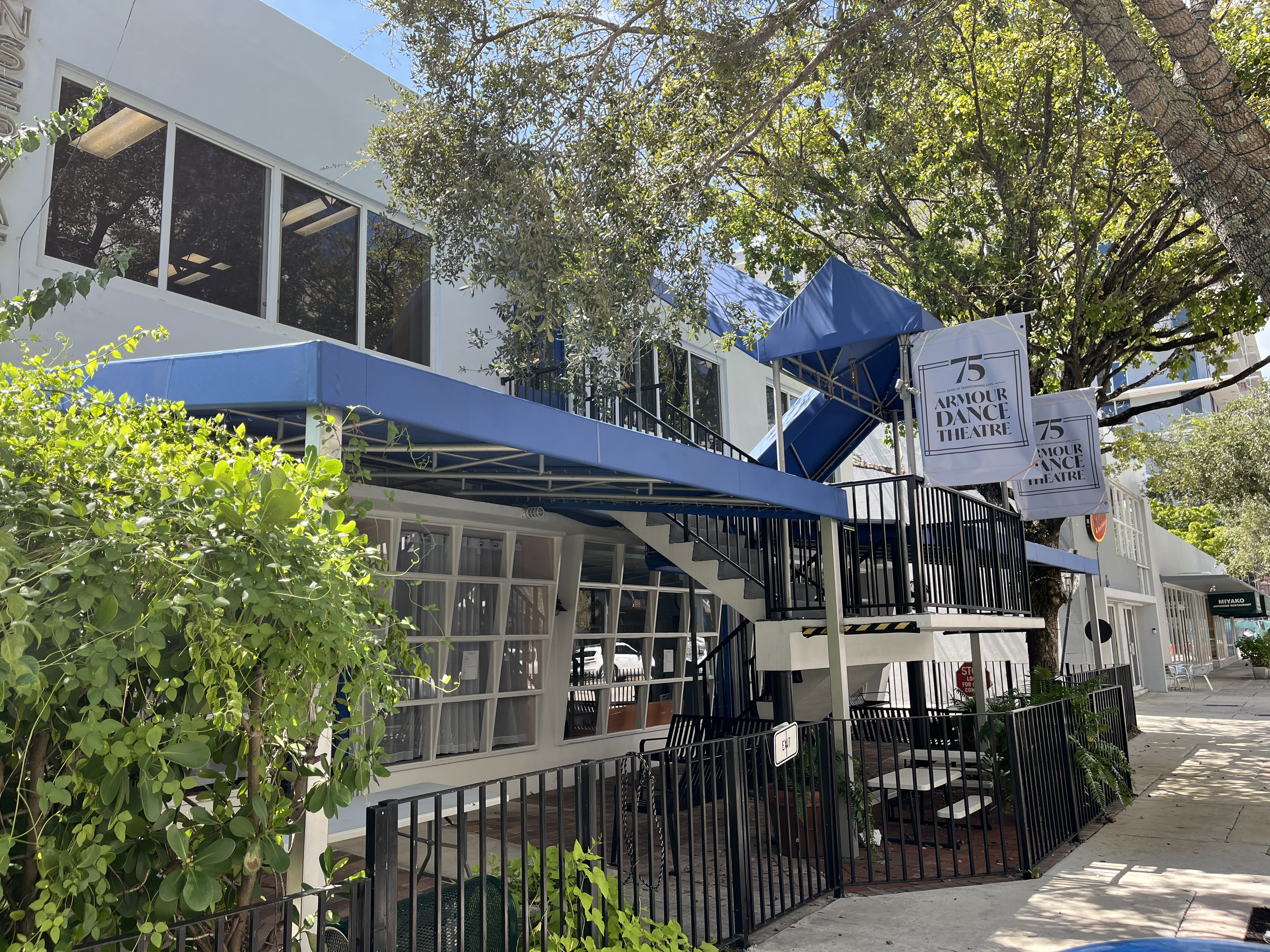
Miami Conservatory

The Miami Conservatory is a school of ballet and classical dance, located in South Miami, Florida. Founded in 1949 by Thomas Armour, it is the oldest school of ballet in South Florida.

The conservatory trains students of all ages, with more of an emphasis on young children. Many of the students of the conservatory go on to perform at the Miami City Ballet, a professional ballet company with a national and international reputation, founded in 1985 by Toby Lerner Ansin with founding artistic director, Edward Villella.

Famous alumni include actress Fiona Hutchison, who learned from Armour as a child.
