= South Miami Senior High School =

Location
- 6856 Southwest 53 Street; Miami, Florida 33155; United States; 25.72107°N 80.30558°W

Information
- Type: Public secondary
- Motto: Our Hope and Pride
- Established: November 10, 1971; 55 years ago
- School district: Miami-Dade County Public Schools
- Principal: Mr. Hebert Penton
- Staff: 77.00 (FTE)
- Grades: 9–12
- Enrollment: 1,576 (2023–2024)
- Student to teacher ratio: 20.47
- Campus: Suburban
- Colors: Orange and brown
- Nickname: Cobras
- Newspaper: The Serpent's Tale
- Yearbook: DeCapello
- Website: southmiamiseniorhigh.org

South Miami Senior High School is located at 6856 SW 53rd Street in Glenvar Heights, unincorporated Miami-Dade County, Florida, in the United States; located about a mile and a half west of the University of Miami. Its current principal is Mr. Hebert Penton.

== History ==
South Miami Senior opened its doors to students on November 10, 1971. It was built to relieve the overcrowding at Southwest Miami High, Coral Park Senior High and Coral Gables High School. The student body selected the Cobra as its mascot. The school's first principal, Warren Burchell, was originally from Ohio and chose the school colors, orange and brown, for the team colors of the NFL Cleveland Browns.

Since opening, South Miami has had eight principals: Dr. Warren G. Burchell, Judy Weiner, Thomas L. Shaw, Eugene Butler, Craig Speziale, Gilberto Bonce, Dr. Cadian Collman-Perez, and Hebert Penton. Dr. Burchell's term was the longest, at 22 years.

== Demographics ==
The school is 84% Hispanic, 8% Black, 7% White non-Hispanic, and 1% Asian.

== Notable alumni ==
- Jose Barrios – former MLB player
- Ed Beckman – former NFL tight end
- Fernanza Burgess – former NFL quarterback
- Wayne Capers – former NFL wide receiver
- Phil Clarke – former NFL linebacker
- John Corker – former NFL linebacker
- Jeanette Dousdebes Rubio – former Miami Dolphins cheerleader and wife of Marco Rubio
- Margie Goldstein-Engle – equestrian show horse champion
- Albert Gonzalez – hacker, convicted of computer fraud
- Damian Harrell – Former Arena Football League wide receiver/defensive back
- Paul Hazel – former NFL linebacker
- Fred Jones – former NFL player
- Dennis McKinnon – former NFL wide receiver
- Mia Michaels – choreographer, judge on So You Think You can Dance
- Raúl De Molina – host of El Gordo y la Flaca
- Pitbull - rapper and singer
- Carlos Ponce – singer, songwriter, actor
- Julio Robaina – politician
- Marco Rubio – politician, 72nd United States Secretary of State
- Dennis Sherrill – former MLB player
- Derrick Thomas – former NFL linebacker, Pro Football and College Football Hall of Famer

== See also ==
- Silver Knight Awards
- Miami-Dade County Public Schools
- Education in the United States
