= Suki Lopez =

American actress

Suki Lopez is an American actress, dancer, and graphic designer. She plays Nina on the children's television series Sesame Street.

== Early life and career ==
Lopez grew up in Miami, Florida. Lopez began studying ballet at age three, at the Maria Verdeja School of the Arts. She participated in talent shows and school choir as a child, and performed in Spanish-language commercials that aired in Latin America. She studied dance at summer workshops with Joffrey Ballet and American Ballet Theatre. The first Broadway musical she saw was Hairspray, which further inspired her to pursue acting as a career.

Lopez participated in musical theatre in high school. She attended Our Lady of Lourdes Academy, where she performed in the Troupe 6273, and was cast in Thoroughly Modern Millie in her senior year. Lopez later moved to New York City to study at the Collaborative Arts Project 21 acting conservatory. She appeared in a productions of the Singin' in the Rain musical, and in a national tour of the musical West Side Story. Lopez also performed on the Disney Cruise Line, appearing in the shows Disney Wishes and Disney's Believe. She also understudied the role of Jasmine from Aladdin, and performed as Belle from Beauty and the Beast.

== Sesame Street ==
Lopez joined the cast of Sesame Street during its 46th season in 2016, the first year that the show had moved first-run to HBO, marking her television debut. Her first audition was reading a scene involving a heart to heart conversation with someone performing as Elmo, and her second audition included singing and improvisation with the Murray Monster puppet. Her casting was part of a series of updates and changes to the show that coincided with the move to HBO. Lopez portrays Nina, works at the Sesame Street laundromat and bike store, and works as a babysitter for Elmo. Sesame Street promotional materials described Nina as "a young bilingual Hispanic woman who uses her wit, compassion, and charisma to help the furry residents of Sesame Street solve their daily dilemmas". Lopez said of the character: "Nina is a millennial, and she has a bunch of jobs. So I guess she is like me." Lopez watched and enjoyed Sesame Street as a child. Shortly after Lopez's character was introduced, a petition was circulated asking for Nina to be depicted as a college graduate.

== Personal life ==
Lopez has one brother. Her first name means "like" in Japanese. She has also worked in graphic design, as a choreographer and acting coach, and has run social media accounts for various dance studios in Florida. While appearing in Sesame Street, Lopez was also studying liberal arts at The New School in New York City.
