= South Miami, Florida =

- City
- City of South Miami
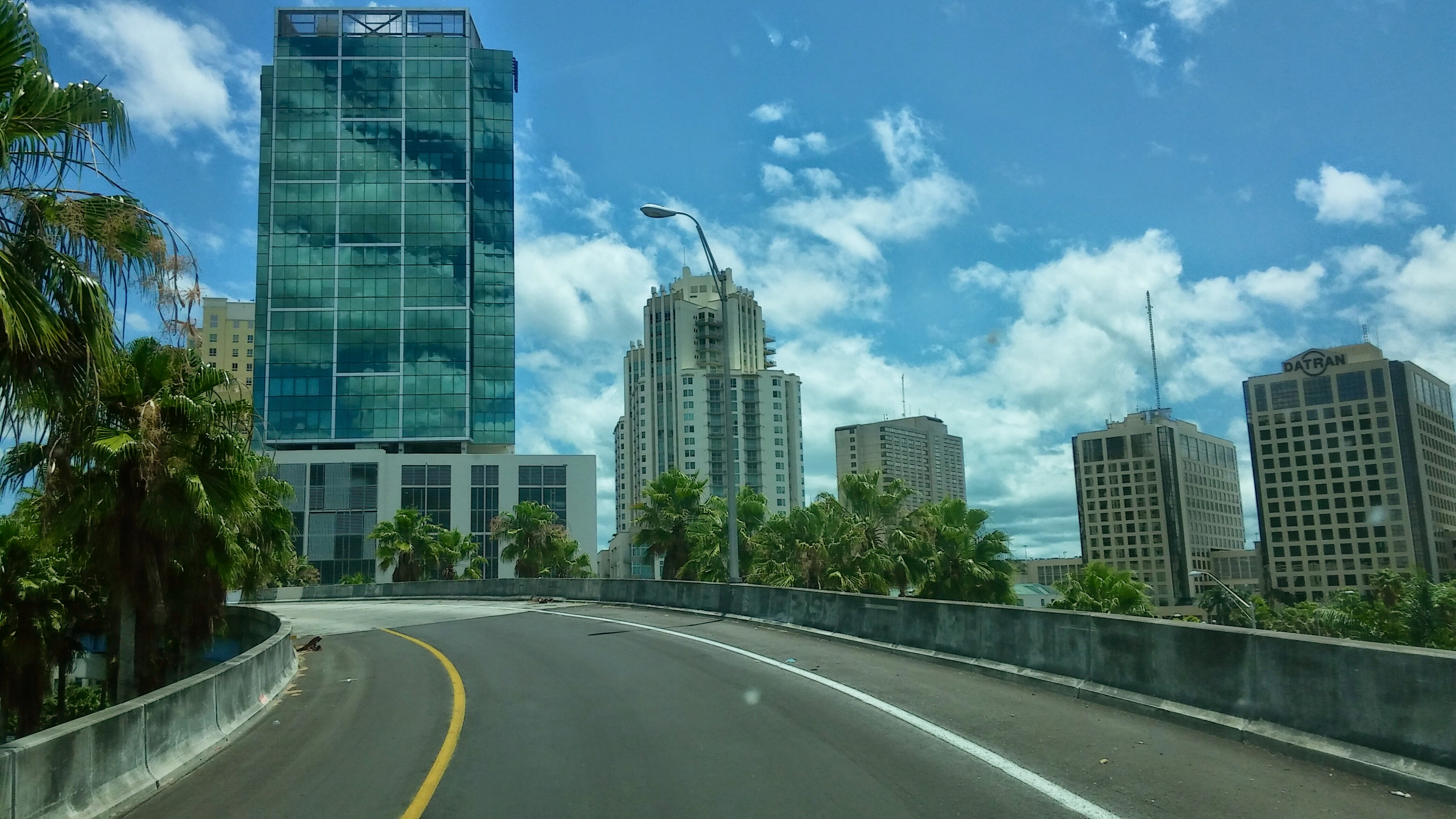

- Flag Seal
- Nickname: SoMi
- Motto: The City of Pleasant Living
- Location in Miami-Dade County and the state of Florida

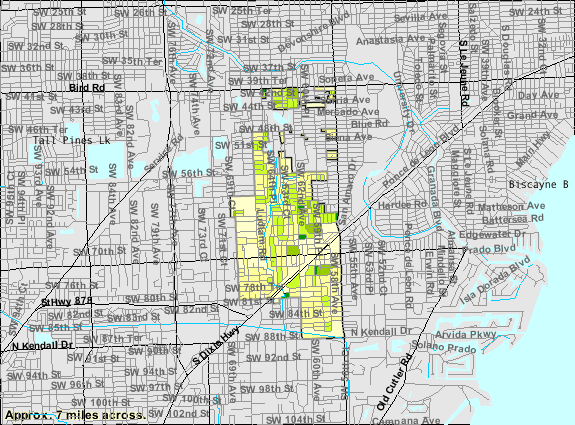
- U.S. Census Bureau map showing city limits
- Coordinates: 25°42′29″N 80°17′43″W
- Country: United States
- State: Florida
- County: Miami-Dade
- Settled: 1897
- Incorporated: June 24, 1927

Government
  - Type: Council-Manager

Area
  - Total: 2.31 sq mi (5.98 km^{2})
  - Land: 2.27 sq mi (5.87 km^{2})
  - Water: 0.042 sq mi (0.11 km^{2})
- Elevation: 10 ft (3.0 m)

Population (2020)
  - Total: 12,026
  - Density: 5,304.5/sq mi (2,048.07/km^{2})
- Time zone: UTC-5 (EST)
  - Summer (DST): UTC-4 (EDT)
- ZIP Codes: 33143, 33155 (Miami)
- Area codes: 305, 786, 645
- FIPS code: 12-67550
- GNIS feature ID: 2405491
- Website: www.southmiamifl.gov

South Miami is a city in Miami-Dade County, Florida, United States. The city is part of the Miami metropolitan area of South Florida. The population was 12,026 as of the 2020 census.

== History ==
South Florida had been roamed by Native Americans (Tequesta, Calusa, and Jaega), probably for centuries, before white pioneers advanced through Little Hunting Ground (later known as Miami's Coconut Grove neighborhood) to Big Hunting Ground (now known as the Cutler neighborhood of Palmetto Bay).

Wilson Alexander Larkins (1860–1946) was 36 years old when he, his wife (Katie Estelle Burtashaw) and five children, and their livestock arrived in Fort Dallas (now the Lummus Park Historic District of Miami) in 1896. He purchased property west of Red Road and Sunset Drive, where he built a home and barn. He also built the first general store east of that area in 1898 at what is known today as Cartagena Plaza or Cocoplum Circle (actually in Coral Gables). As the community grew, he established a post office in the community. Larkins became the first postmaster, a role he held for sixteen years; he named the area "Manila", but the majority of the settlers, who began building homes around his store, preferred the name of "Larkins" in his honor.

A depot was placed along the Florida East Coast Railway in 1904, and in the same year, John Moses Dowling built the first house within what is now South Miami city limits. His son-in-law opened the first store on the west side of the tracks, called the White Palace Grocery.

Other prominent historic families have historic buildings and streets named for them, such as Dorn Avenue (Southwest 59th Avenue) and the Shelley Building, among others. Harold W. Dorn and his brother Robert moved to the area in 1910; their primary interest was growing mango and avocado. Mary E. Dorn was the first president of the Cocoplum Thimble Club, the first Women's club in Larkins. In 1925, the Dorn brothers built the Riviera Theatre at 5700 South Dixie Highway; in 1934, Charles T. Fuchs moved his Holsum Bakery from Homestead to South Miami and turned the Riviera Theatre Building into a bakery.

The first African-American to purchase land in the Larkins area was Marshall Williamson, who moved there from Madison, Florida. He built his home at 6500 SW 60th Avenue and allowed it to be used for church services even before the construction was completed. In 1916, he donated land for the St. John's AME (African Methodist Episcopal) Church, one of Larkins' first churches and the first church in the black community; it is located at 6461 SW 59th Place. Later, Williamson also donated land for the J. R. E. Lee School. Because of his generosity, the black neighborhood became known as Madison Square, after Williamson's hometown. Williamson died in 1972. Named after him is Marshall Williamson Park, at 6125 SW 68 Street.

In 1926, area residents wanted to incorporate their area, and because of the booming city to the north of them, they chose the name of "Town of South Miami". The original town boundaries were Red Road on the east, Kendall Drive to the south, Palmetto Road to the west (now Palmetto Expressway), and Bird Road and Miller Drive to the north. The year 1926 also saw the first street lighting and the first incoming class of freshmen at the newly chartered University of Miami campus, which abuts the city of South Miami eastern boundary along Red Road (SW 57th Avenue). Also founded with a university theme that same year was the Cambridge Lawns neighborhood of South Miami, situated just 0.7 miles (1.1 km) from the university campus. The neighborhood's Cambridge Lawns Historic District, some 30 homes in the Tudor Revival and Mediterranean revival style completed in 1928, were granted historic recognition by the City of South Miami in 2005.

Also in 1926, South Miami received extensive damage from the 1926 Miami hurricane. The town's leaders asked Congress to "relieve the people of their income tax for the current year," but federal assistance was not forthcoming. The Florida East Coast Railway station burned down, leaving the town without a station for many years. Residents suffered storm damage again from Hurricane Andrew in 1992 and from Hurricane Bonnie (1998).

On June 25, 1927, W. A. Forster was sworn in as South Miami's first mayor.

In 1933, the original six square miles of South Miami were reduced to just over three miles (5 km) due to an effort to reduce municipal responsibilities. The city's size was reduced again in 1937, and many of the northern city residents sued to get out of the city. This is why the city of South Miami has the most irregular boundaries of any city in Miami-Dade County today.

Of mid-century South Miami, local historian Donna Shelley writes:

In the mid-1950s, South Miami was at the crossroads between town and country. It was where you could buy hay for your horse and a tux for a social event. The economy was booming post World War II: a bank was established, the First National Bank of South Miami, new buildings were constructed, a hospital established (South Miami Hospital) and the community prospered. The Holsum Baking Company, which moved to South Miami from Homestead in the 1930s was an important contributor to South Miami's growth. Many long-time residents recall waking up to the olfactory stimulation of bread being baked at the Holsum bakery on the corner of Sunset Drive and Red Road.

Construction of the current City Hall building was approved by referendum in 1955. Designed by architect Henry George Fink, the governmental seat on Sunset Drive was dedicated in October 1956 by Mayor Paul U. Tevis. The City Manager was Leonard L. Bishop, Jr.

Jack Block was elected mayor of the city in 1968, and was thereafter re-elected every two years until 1984 when, as he told interviewer Gregory W. Bush, "I started to not enjoy it as much." In that interview, for the University of Miami Oral History Program, he gave snapshots of South Miami history when he told Bush (a history professor at the University of Miami),

I moved here March 6, 1956, and lived in the same house. I love this city. There are times you get aggravated with what is going on. It's a friendly community. Do you remember when they had the riots down in Overtown back at Nixon's first inauguration. They had the Convention down here. Everywhere in town there were riots going on. In the city of South Miami we had a big barbeque which was held in the black area in one of the black parks. Where the Jaycees and myself, I cooked ribs all night long, and all the white people were there serving the black community. And we had no problems. When there were police problems the black community would get hold of me and tell me, "There's a car load of people coming in from Coconut Grove," and we could tell the police. That's the way this community is. It's a close-knit community. Black people living with white, you don't get that anywhere else.

In 1990, Catherine (Rutherford) McCann (1933–2009) was elected as South Miami's first female Mayor, and was re-elected in 1992. She was responsible for the clean-up of South Miami after Hurricane Andrew; the Miami Herald wrote, "She had an encyclopedic knowledge of the South Miami city charter. She pushed for affordable housing and responsible development."

In 2000, South Miami joined other municipalities in the country in forming city partnerships to help foster cultural and economic development between cities around the world. South Miami is a member of Sister Cities International and formed relationships with the cities of Grand Turk in Turks and Caicos Islands and Basseterre in Saint Kitts and Nevis.

According to reporting by SOMI magazine, a local publication, during early October 2018, "[o]n August 21, 2018, in the City of South Miami Commission Chambers the forging of a 'Sister-City' between the City of South Miami, Florida, and the Municipio de Medellin, Colombia, was formalized."

== Geography ==
South Miami is bordered to the east by the city of Coral Gables, to the south by the town of Pinecrest, to the west by unincorporated Glenvar Heights, and to the north by unincorporated Coral Terrace. U.S. Route 1 (South Dixie Highway) passes through the city, leading northeast 8 miles (13 km) to Downtown Miami and southwest 20 miles (32 km) to Homestead.

According to the U.S. Census Bureau, South Miami has a total area of 2.3 square miles (6.0 km^{2}), of which 0.04 square miles (0.10 km^{2}), or 1.78%, are water.

=== Surrounding areas ===
Glenvar Heights / Unincorporated Miami-Dade County / Coral Terrace
Coral Terrace Coral Gables
Unincorporated Miami-Dade County / Glenvar Heights Coral Gables, Unincorporated Miami-Dade County
Glenvar Heights, Pinecrest Coral Gables
Glenvar Heights / Pinecrest

== Demographics ==
Historical population
Census	Pop.	Note	%±
1930	1,160		—
1940	2,408		107.6%
1950	4,809		99.7%
1960	9,846		104.7%
1970	11,780		19.6%
1980	10,895		−7.5%
1990	10,404		−4.5%
2000	10,741		3.2%
2010	11,657		8.5%
2020	12,026		3.2%
U.S. Decennial Census

=== 2020 census ===
As of the 2020 census, South Miami had a population of 12,026. The median age was 39.5 years. 18.7% of residents were under the age of 18 and 16.7% were 65 years of age or older. For every 100 females, there were 95.9 males, and for every 100 females age 18 and over there were 93.7 males.

100.0% of residents lived in urban areas, while 0.0% lived in rural areas.

There were 4,879 households in South Miami, of which 29.5% had children under the age of 18 living in them. Of all households, 39.6% were married-couple households, 22.8% were households with a male householder and no spouse or partner present, and 31.3% were households with a female householder and no spouse or partner present. About 29.7% of all households were made up of individuals and 11.1% had someone living alone who was 65 years of age or older.

There were 5,297 housing units, of which 7.9% were vacant. The homeowner vacancy rate was 1.0% and the rental vacancy rate was 9.0%.

South Miami racial composition (Hispanics excluded from racial categories) (NH = Non-Hispanic)
Race	Number	Percentage
White (NH)	3,466	28.82%
Black or African American (NH)	1,424	11.84%
Native American or Alaska Native (NH)	6	0.05%
Asian (NH)	493	4.10%
Pacific Islander or Native Hawaiian (NH)	1	0.01%
Some other race (NH)	96	0.80%
Two or more races/Multiracial (NH)	327	2.72%
Hispanic or Latino (any race)	6,213	51.66%
Total	12,026	100.00%

=== 2010 census ===
South Miami Demographics
2010 census	South Miami	Miami-Dade County	Florida
Total population	11,657	2,496,435	18,801,310
Population, percent change, 2000 to 2010	+8.5%	+10.8%	+17.6%
Population density	5,137.6/sq mi	1,315.5/sq mi	350.6/sq mi
White or Caucasian (including White Hispanic)	75.1%	73.8%	75.0%
(Non-Hispanic White or Caucasian)	35.4%	15.4%	57.9%
Black or African-American	17.0%	18.9%	16.0%
Hispanic or Latino (of any race)	43.1%	65.0%	22.5%
Asian	3.9%	1.5%	2.4%
Native American or Native Alaskan	0.3%	0.2%	0.4%
Pacific Islander or Native Hawaiian	0.0%	0.0%	0.1%
Two or more races (Multiracial)	2.0%	2.4%	2.5%
Some Other Race	1.7%	3.2%	3.6%

As of the 2010 U.S. census, there were 11,657 people, 4,127 households, and 2,596 families residing in the city.

=== 2000 census ===
In 2000, 26.1% had children under the age of 18 living with them, 40.4% were married couples living together, 15.2% had a female householder with no husband present, and 39.7% were non-families. 30.7% of all households were made up of individuals, and 9.0% had someone living alone who was 65 years of age or older. The average household size was 2.47 and the average family size was 3.15.

In 2000, the city population was spread out, with 22.7% under the age of 18, 8.2% from 18 to 24, 31.8% from 25 to 44, 23.7% from 45 to 64, and 13.6% who were 65 years of age or older. The median age was 37 years. For every 100 females, there were 92.8 males. For every 100 females age 18 and over, there were 90.4 males.

In 2000, the median income for a household in the city was $42,488, and the median income for a family was $57,791. Males had a median income of $37,250 versus $29,772 for females. The per capita income for the city was $24,526. About 8.9% of families and 17.1% of the population were below the poverty line, including 22.0% of those under age 18 and 13.4% of those age 65 or over.

As of 2000, speakers of English as a first language accounted for 59.69% of residents, while Spanish speakers consisted of 37.45%, and speakers of French made up 1.26% of the population.

== Economy ==
The South Miami business community is served by Chamber South with offices at 6410 S.W. 80 Street in South Miami, and by the Red Sunset Merchants Association of South Miami.

The Consulate-General of Mexico in Miami is located on the ground floor of the office building located at 5975 Southwest 72nd Street (Sunset Drive) in South Miami. Tech/automotive ecommerce startup company PartsHawk occupies the top floor of the same building.

The nine-acre property site of the Holsum Bakery was for decades afterward known as the Bakery Center to the local residents, and various businesses came and went on that site long after Holsum was gone.

A large complex called, in fact, the Bakery Center, a $35 million project, was proposed in 1982. It was built and opened in 1985, but it was not popular and was demolished in 1996. South Miami residents complained about the architecture, which seemed closed from pedestrians, elitist, and far too tall for a town that liked small, homey buildings and mom-and-pop shops. (Historian Donna Shelley wrote an essay about it entitled "From Baking Dough, To Spending Dough, To Losing Dough"; The New York Times wrote in 1996 that "few retail projects failed as badly as the Bakery Center".) Perhaps the one admired feature was on the outside: an enormous mural by Richard Haas. The investors were never able to find enough small businesses to rent all available spaces in the monolithic building. The consistently successful business, an IMAX theater, was undervalued and closed.

In the 1990s, a large shopping mall called The Shops at Sunset Place was built on the site a retail/entertainment center with a wide, welcoming entrance. The mall had many anchor stores, a mega-plex movie site with 24 movie theaters, and restaurants but several of these places have closed. Food is available from restaurants (such as sidewalk crêpe makers), and it is a popular teenage hangout.

The mall has its detractors. Gabriel Lopez-Bernal, an urban planner praised by the Miami New Times for his blogging on "civic discourse", wrote: "Unlike its predecessor, Sunset Place was designed to be an open-aired Mediterranean community, incorporating former mall aspects like big boxed anchor tenants with street-level restaurants, faux cityscapes, and even a few residential units. The center was originally envisioned to be an entertainment center, but the quick failure of some of the theme restaurants and IMAX Theater, quickly changed intended target use. Since its inception, the mall has struggled to maintain a strong and lasting business base."

In 2015, The Shops at Sunset Place was acquired for $110.2 million by the joint venture of Federal Realty Investment Trust (NYSE: FRT), Coconut Grove-based Grass River Property, and Miami Beach-based Comras Co. The mall is, thus, under new management and has been seeking to redevelop the site with plans for a new hotel and other improvements.

== Transportation ==
South Miami is served by Metrobus throughout the area, and by the Miami Metrorail, connecting the city to Downtown Kendall, Downtown Miami, and the Miami Intermodal Center at Miami International Airport. Metrorail is available at:

- South Miami (SW 72nd Street and U.S. 1)

The city provides a free shuttle service with nine designated stops on a two-mile loop within the city's Downtown area during specified hours on Tuesdays to Saturdays (no service on Sundays and Mondays).

== Culture ==
The city has numerous parks and historic buildings, restaurants and unique shops. Much of South Miami stretches down U.S. 1, along which it features a wide variety of retail stores and restaurants on long-owned real estate or in newer shopping plazas. The South Miami Branch library of the Miami-Dade Public Library System is open 6 days a week and is open to younger visitors.

=== Parks ===
South Miami has a number of parks, including:

- All-America Park, a passive park providing a natural setting with native trees and picnic tables
- Brewer Park, which has tennis, handball, and basketball courts, as well as a playground area and picnic area
- Dante Fascell Park
- Dog Park
- Fuchs Park, a natural area with a fountain in the pond, where the ducks are friendly and pleased to be fed
- Jean Willis Park (sometimes also referred to as the Jean H. Willis Flowering Tree Park), a small area next to the South Miami Police Department featuring a gazebo, picnic benches and a variety of native flowering trees and for which South Miami Senior High School students constructed a pair of trellises to anchor both ends of the park in 2013;
- Marshall Williamson Park, which has tennis courts and a gazebo
- Murray Park (adjacent to the Gibson-Bethel Community Center), which has lighted basketball courts, a T-ball field, two soccer fields, and a flag football field
- Palmer Park, with fields for playing baseball and T-Ball (including through an organized league, the South Miami Youth Baseball League), softball, flag football, and soccer
- Paseo Park
- South Miami Park
- Van Smith Park, a natural hammock park
- Veterans Park
- Vice Mayor Robert C. Welsh, Jr. Park

In 2017, the City of South Miami adopted a Parks and Recreation Master Plan which is a long-range planning document that is meant to help shape the direction, development and delivery of the city's parks and recreation system over an 8- to 10-year period from adoption. According to the City of South Miami's website, "[t]he purpose of this plan is to advance the mission and vision of the Parks and Recreation Department to further the establishment of a high quality parks system and maximize the effectiveness of the department and its resources."

=== Media ===
South Miami is served by the Miami market for local radio and television. Three newspapers in South Miami include the hyperlocal South Miami News, which is part of the Community Newspapers chain, the Miami Herald, which publishes a weekly zoned "Neighbors" section serving South Miami and adjacent communities, and the weekly Miami New Times. Long-time South Miami resident John Edward Smith (image marketing and business development consultant) publishes SOMI Magazine every two months, whose "About SOMI" web page states "balances hometown interest while promoting the many businesses located in the South Miami Town Center."

=== Cuisine ===
South Miami has a diverse offering in its restaurants. Dara Smith and Olee Fowler wrote in January 2020, "Not historically top of mind as one of the city's major food destinations, South Miami's culinary scene is slowly taking shape. From fine dining to fast casual, [there are] can't miss food and drink spots." There are many Japanese restaurants with sushi bars. Italian, American and Cuban restaurants are also easy to find.

== Education ==
Miami-Dade County Public Schools serves South Miami.

- South Miami K–8 Center (an expressive arts magnet school)
- South Miami Middle Community School (Center for the Arts)
- South Miami Senior High School (Unincorporated Miami-Dade County)

South Miami is also home to the Miami Conservatory (now known as the Thomas Armour Youth Ballet). Founded in 1949, it is Miami's oldest and best known ballet school.

== Government ==
=== Structure ===
South Miami uses a City Manager form of government. The Commission sets the policies and the City Manager acts as the chief executive officer. Commissioners are elected to four-year terms and the Mayor is elected to a two-year term. The Mayor is the Chair of the City Commission meetings.

South Miami City Government as of November 2022 includes:

- Mayor: Javier E. Fernandez
- Vice Mayor: Lisa Bonich
- Commissioner: Steve Calle
- Commissioner: Brian Corey
- Commissioner: Josh Liebman
- City Manager: Genaro "Chip" Iglesias (As of January 2023)
- Mayor of South Miami

Javier E. Fernandez 2,833

Horace G. Feliu 1,652

- Commissioner Group I

Steve Calle 2,126

Luis Joseph Gil 2,026

- Commissioner Group IV

Lisa Bonich 2,230

Michelle Readon 2,025

== South Miami Hospital ==
South Miami Hospital, located at 62nd Avenue (Paul Tevis Road) and U.S. Route 1, opened in 1960 as a 100-bed hospital and currently serves 467 beds. It is one of seven hospitals in the Baptist Health South Florida system. The hospital was recognized as a Magnet Hospital for Nursing Excellence in 2004 and again in 2008, by the American Nurses Credentialing Center. It was also on Solucient's list of top 100 hospitals in the country and earned the Florida Governor's Sterling Award in 2010. It was named the No. 1 hospital in South Florida by U.S. News & World Report in 2012, and ranked No. 42 in the country in geriatrics and No. 47 in orthopedics. The Hospital features an addiction treatment program, a cardiac catheterization lab, a diabetes program and a full oncology department as well as the center for Robotic Surgery, the Center for Women and Infants, South Miami Heart Center and a Level III Neonatal Intensive Care Unit. The Hospital earned $35.5 million in 2012.

== Notable people ==
- Nick Akoto, soccer player
- Rodney Mandelstam, 1960 Wimbledon Boys tennis champion
