= Our Lady of Lourdes Academy =

Location
- 5525 SW 84th Street; Miami, Florida 33143; United States; 25°41′37″N 80°16′58″W

Information
- Type: Private, All-Girls
- Motto: With Mary in All Things
- Religious affiliation: Roman Catholic
- Established: 1963
- President: Carmen Teresa Fernández
- Grades: 9–12
- Colors: Blue and white
- Nickname: Bobcats
- Accreditation: Southern Association of Colleges and Schools
- Newspaper: The Grotto
- Yearbook: Le Fleuve
- Website: olla.org

Our Lady of Lourdes Academy is a Catholic all-girls high school in the unincorporated community of Ponce-Davis in Miami-Dade County, Florida, United States. It has been managed by the Immaculate Heart of Mary since its 1963 foundation.

In 2006, Our Lady of Lourdes Academy was named one of the Top 50 Catholic high schools in the U.S. by the Catholic High School Honor Roll. It has also been named a Blue Ribbon School of Excellence.

== Notable alumni ==
- Gloria Estefan, singer and seven-time Grammy award winner
- Suki Lopez, actor, Sesame Street
- Valerie Loureda, professional wrestler and MMA fighter
- Ana Villafañe, actress, played role of Gloria Estefan in Broadway musical On Your Feet!
