= St. Anthony School (Florida) =

- St. Anthony Catholic School
- U.S. National Register of Historic Places
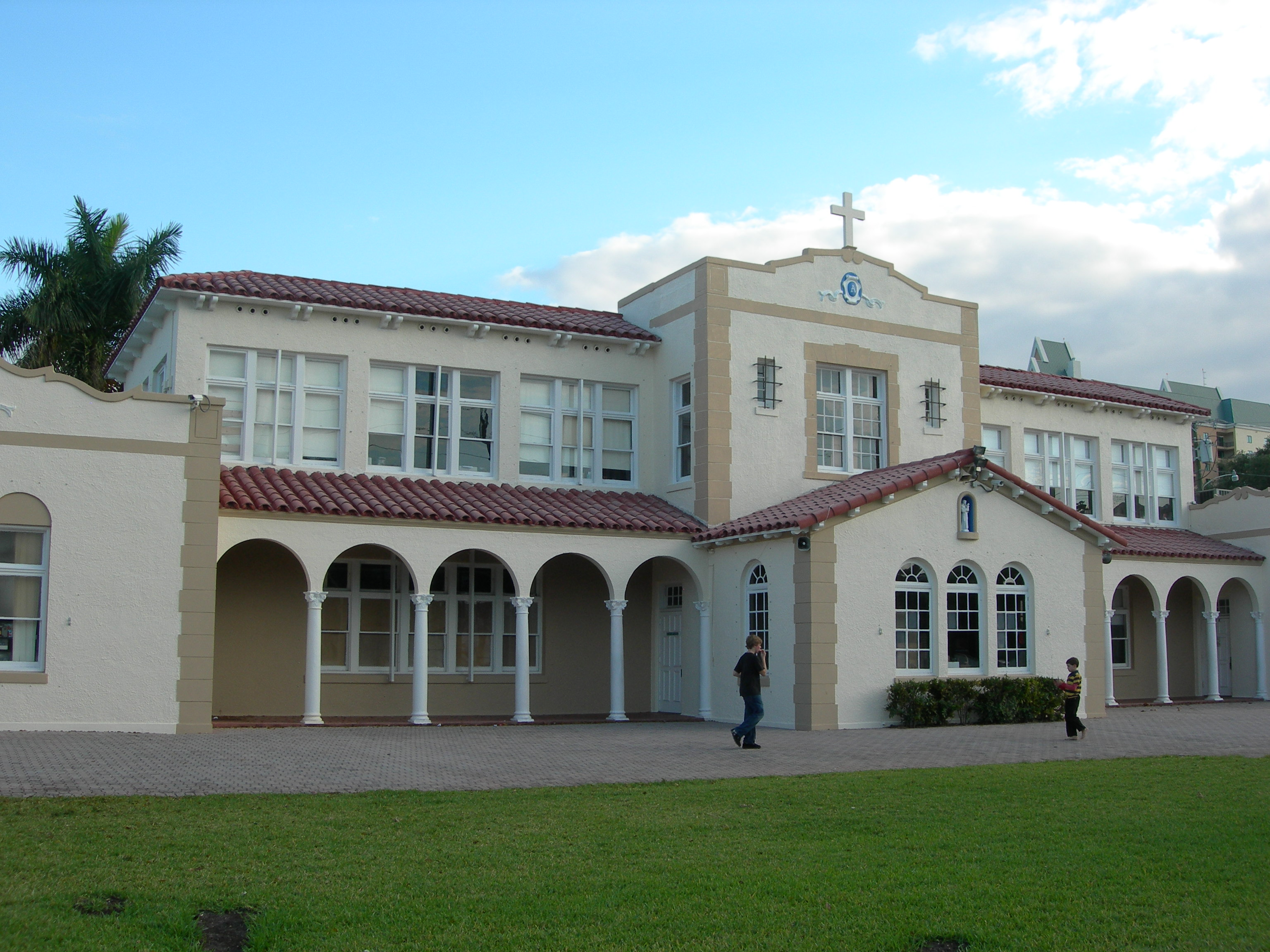
- Location: Fort Lauderdale, Florida
- Coordinates: 26°07′25.94″N 80°07′58.30″W
- Built: 1926, 1938, 1940
- Built by: John Olsson
- Architect: Francis Abreu
- Architectural style: Mission/Spanish Revival
- Website: saintanthonyschoolfl.org
- NRHP reference No.: 97001171
- Added to NRHP: 26 September 1997

St. Anthony Catholic School is a historic school in Fort Lauderdale, Florida. It is located at 820 Northeast 3rd Street. Saint Anthony Catholic School is the parochial Catholic school of St. Anthony Catholic Church in Broward County. On September 26, 1997, it was added to the U.S. National Register of Historic Places. The school building was built in 1926 by John Olsson. The architect was Francis Abreu.

== Notable alumni ==
=== Athletics ===
- Chris Evert, former professional tennis player, member of International Tennis Hall of Fame
- Jeanne Evert, former professional tennis player
- Sarah Lihan, Olympian who placed 9th in women's sailing 470 at 2012 Summer Olympics
- Brian Piccolo, former professional football player, inspiration for film Brian's Song
- Mike Stanley, former professional baseball player and 1995 American League All-Star

=== Arts, entertainment, and civil service ===
- Michael Connelly, author of The Lincoln Lawyer and former president of Mystery Writers of America
- Charles Liteky, former Army chaplain and Medal of Honor recipient
- William J. Zloch, U.S. District Court Judge for the Southern District of Florida
