= Mannosylfructose-phosphate synthase =

Class of enzymes

Identifiers
- EC no.: 2.4.1.246
- CAS no.: 92480-04-1 (not distinguished from EC 2.4.1.167)

Databases
- IntEnz: IntEnz view
- BRENDA: BRENDA entry
- ExPASy: NiceZyme view
- KEGG: KEGG entry
- MetaCyc: metabolic pathway
- PRIAM: profile
- PDB structures: RCSB PDB PDBe PDBsum
Search
- PMC: articles
- PubMed: articles
- NCBI: proteins

Mannosylfructose-phosphate synthase (EC 2.4.1.246, mannosylfructose-6-phosphate synthase, MFPS) is an enzyme with systematic name GDP-mannose:D-fructose-6-phosphate 2-alpha-D-mannosyltransferase. This enzyme catalyses the following chemical reaction

fructose 6-phosphate
+ GDP-mannose
GDP
β-D-fructofuranosyl-α-D-mannopyranoside 6F-phosphate

The enzyme transfers a mannose sugar unit from GDP-mannose to a specific hydroxy group in fructose 6-phosphate (shown in its open-chain form) to give the product disaccharide, with guanosine diphosphate (GDP) as byproduct. It was characterised from the soil proteobacterium and plant pathogen Agrobacterium tumefaciens strain C58, and requires magnesium Mg^{2+} or manganese Mn^{2+} ions for activity. The product is hydrolysed by the enzyme mannosylfructose-phosphate phosphatase to give an osmolyte which protects the organism from osmotic shock.
