= Saint Mary's Cathedral School (Miami) =

Coordinates: 25.843386°N 80.200642°W

St. Mary's Cathedral School
- Miami, Florida; United States

Information
- Type: Private co-educational
- Established: 1939
- Rector: Rev. Christopher B. Marino
- Principal: Mrs. Jocelyn Zlatkin
- Grades: K to 8th Grade

The St. Mary's Cathedral School is located at 7485 N.W. 2nd Ave., Miami, Florida.

== History ==
The school opened October 2, 1939, with eight grades and 230 students. An additional grade was added each year. Eight Sisters from the Sisters of St. Joseph of St. Augustine, Florida were the original teaching staff.

Sister Anna Joseph, S.S.J., was the first principal. The school year 1943-44 had 514 students. The first high school graduation was in 1944 and there were 14 graduates. The last high school graduation was in 1953 and there were 31 graduates. In 1953, the school was reduced to eight grades, which is the current number of grades.

The school year 2008-2009 had 240 students; year 2009-2010 had 385 students; year 2010-2011 had 406; and school year 2011-2012 saw the student population at 420. The school's student capacity is 500 students.

Three religious congregations have ministered at the school: The Sisters of St. Joseph, the Servants of the Pierced Hearts of Jesus and Mary, and the Franciscan Sisters of Allegany.

== Leadership ==
Below are lists of individuals who have led the school.

=== First Sisters of St. Joseph ===
The first eight Sisters of St. Joseph at St. Mary's School:

- Sr. Mary Geneive (2nd Grade)
- Sr. Mary Johannes (4th Grade)
- Sr. Anna Joseph (1st Grade and Principal)
- Sr. Herman Joseph (3rd Grade)
- Sr. Mary Laurenza (5th Grade)
- Sr. Teresa Maria (8th Grade)
- Sr. Francis Regis (6th Grade)
- Sr. Mary Thomas (7th Grade)

=== Principals ===
- Sr. Anna Joseph Dignan (1939–1946)
- Sr. Leo Xavier Reilly (1946–1952)
- Sr. Marie Aloysius Weber (1952–1953)
- Sr. Mary Thomas Marshall (1953–1960)
- Sr. Mary Agnes Hickey (1960–1966)
- Sr. Mary Esther Flanagan (1966–1973)
- Sr. Moira Letmon (1973–1975)
- Sr. Mary Agatha Cleare (1975–1982)
- Sr. Caroline Tucker (1982–1988)
- Sr. Jane Stoecker (1988–2010)
- Mr. Jorge Rodriguez-Miralles (2010-2012)
- Sr. Michelle Fernandez, SCTJM (2012–2018)
- Mr. Eduardo Flor (2018–2021)
- Mrs. Julie Perdomo (2021-2024)
- Mrs. Jocelyn Zlatkin (2024–present)

== See also ==
- Roman Catholic Archdiocese of Miami
- Cathedral of Saint Mary in Miami
