= María Luisa Josefa =

Mexican religious sister (1866–1937)

Venerable María Luisa Josefa of the Blessed Sacrament
- Born: 21 June 1866; Atotonilco el Alto, Jalisco, Mexico
- Died: 11 February 1937 (aged 50); Guadalajara, Jalisco, Mexico

María Luisa Josefa of the Most Blessed Sacrament, also called "Mother Luisita" (June 21, 1866 – February 11, 1937) was a Mexican Catholic religious sister who founded the Carmelite Sisters of the Sacred Heart of Mexico and the Carmelite Sisters of the Most Sacred Heart of Los Angeles. A beatification process for her was opened and she has been declared venerable.

== Life ==
She was born María Luisa de la Peña y Navarro on June 21, 1866 in Atotonilco el Alto, Jalisco, the third (and first surviving) of fourteen children. Although she felt drawn to the religious life, at the age of fifteen, in obedience to her parents, she married Pascual Rojas, a prominent physician twice her age. Their life together was happy. They built the little Hospital of the Sacred Heart to serve those less fortunate. After fourteen years of married life, María Luisa was left a widow, in 1896.

Eight years later María Luisa entered the Cloistered Carmelites and became immersed in the spirituality of Carmel. After seven months she was asked by the archbishop to return to her work at the hospital which needed her guidance. Along with the hospital, she opened a school and orphanage.

The archbishop told her that she would have to join an existing religious congregation. She joined the Sister Servants of the Blessed Sacrament. Four years later the archbishop asked her to return as she was needed at the hospital and with the children. More women joined her. This time the archbishop suggested that she found a religious congregation; the Carmelite Sisters of the Sacred Heart (Hermanas Carmelitas del Sagrado Corazón, also called Carmelitas de Tijuana) were established on February 2, 1921. Mother Luisita's charism for the new Carmelite branch she founded was "to unite the spirit of Carmel with the active apostolate".

On June 24, 1927, María Luisa and two other nuns sought refuge in Los Angeles, California from the religious persecutions in Mexico at that time. This led to the establishment of twelve Carmels in the United States with a novitiate and eventually to the establishment of The Carmelite Sisters of the Most Sacred Heart of Los Angeles, a sister-congregation to the foundation in Mexico. After two years in the United States, María Luisa returned to Guadalajara, where she continued her work of providing healthcare for the poor.

María Luisa died on February 11, 1937. In 1942 her remains were secretly taken to be buried in Guadalajara, Jalisco. In 1966 they were brought back to the place of her birth Atotonilco. In 1998 they were placed in a special chapel in that town.

== Veneration ==
On July 1, 2000 Pope John Paul II promulgated that María Luisa be called venerable, which means that it has been proven that she practiced heroic virtue. Another miracle from her intercession is still needed in order to receive beatification prior to canonization. María Luisa Joséfa of the Most Blessed Sacrament is the designated patron of the Santa Clara, CA convent of the Servants of the Lord and the Virgin of Matara.
