= Carmelite Sisters of the Most Sacred Heart of Los Angeles =

Religious institute in Alhambra, California, United States

The Carmelite Sisters of the Most Sacred Heart of Los Angeles is a Catholic religious institute of the Discalced Carmelite Order founded by Mother Maria Luisa Josefa of the Most Blessed Sacrament (Mother Luisita). It is based in Alhambra, California, a suburb of Los Angeles.

== About the Carmelite Sisters ==
The way of life of the Carmelite Sisters of Los Angeles is rooted in the Gospel, the Church, and the spirituality of Carmel as lived out through the charism of their foundress, Mother Maria Luisa Josefa. Their mission statement is three-fold: "Educating for Life with the Mind and Heart of Christ” in schools; being “At the Service of the Family for Life” through eldercare; and “Fostering a Deeper Spiritual Life” through individual and group retreats.

== History ==
In the 1920s during the revolution and religious persecution in Mexico, Mother Luisita established schools, hospitals, and orphanages despite being scrutinized by the government. "As the fictional women in The Handmaid’s Tale are forced to wear their garb, the real religious women of Mexico were threatened with death for wearing theirs." The very persecution which sought to destroy her work only spread it to another land when Mother Luisita and two companions entered the United States (incognito) as religious refugees on June 24, 1927, the feast of the Sacred Heart of Jesus. They established roots in the Archdiocese of Los Angeles.

The community has grown since its beginnings with 3 sisters in 1927. Today, the Carmelite Sisters of Los Angeles has grown to 143 professed sisters.

== Apostolic work ==
Carmelites carry out their work at a number of sites in the states of California, Arizona, Colorado and Florida.

=== Elder care ===
- Santa Teresita - established 1930 (Skilled Nursing & Assisted Living)
- Marycrest Manor - established 1956 (Skilled Nursing)
- Avila Gardens - established 2000 (Independent Living)

=== Retreat work ===
- Sacred Heart Retreat House - established 1941
- St. Joseph's Conference and Evangelization Center

=== Education ===
==== Child care centers ====
- Little Flower Educational Child Care Center - established 1929
- Hayden Child Care Center - established 1958

==== Elementary schools ====
- (formerly) Saint Joseph (La Puente, CA)
- Saint Philomena (Carson, CA)
- Holy Innocents (Long Beach, CA)
- Loretto School (Douglas, AZ)
- St. Theresa (Coral Gables, FL)
- Saints Peter and Paul (Wheat Ridge, CO)

==== High schools ====
- Coleman F. Carroll High School (Coral Gables, FL)
- JSerra High School (San Juan Capistrano, CA)

== Carmelite Saints ==
- Our Lady of Mount Carmel
- Saint Teresa of Avila
- Saint John of the Cross
- Saint Therese of the Child Jesus and the Holy Face
- Saint Teresa of Los Andes
- Saint Teresa Benedicta of the Cross (Edith Stein)

== Sources ==
=== Written by the Sisters ===
- Moments of Grace: True Stories in the Lives of the Carmelites Sisters of the Most Sacred Heart of Los Angeles. (2015)
- Spirit of Carmel published print newsletters (online: 2014-2020)

=== Written by others ===
- Caterine, Darryl V. (2001). Conservative Catholicism and the Carmelites: Identity, Ethnicity, and Tradition in the Modern Church. Indiana University Press.
