= Gamson =

Gamson is a surname. Notable people with the surname include:

- Annabelle Gamson (1928–2023), American dancer and choreographer
- Arnold Gamson (1926–2018), American conductor, particularly opera
- David Gamson (born 1961), American keyboardist, producer, songwriter, arranger, engineer
- Joshua Gamson (born 1962), American scholar and author
- Rosanna Gamson, American dance choreographer
- Stephen Gamson (born 1965), American artist and art collector
- William A. Gamson (1934–2021), American sociologist and academic
- Zelda F. Gamson (1936–2026), American sociologist, writer and activist

== See also ==
- Gambeson
