= West Kendall, Florida =

West Kendall
- Unincorporated community
- Location within the state of Florida West Kendall (the United States)
- Coordinates: 25°42′1″N 80°24′30″W
- Country: United States
- State: Florida
- County: Miami-Dade

Population
  - Total: ~200,000
- Time zone: UTC-5 (Eastern (EST))
  - Summer (DST): UTC-4 (EDT)
- ZIP codes: 33173, 33183, 33175, 33185, 33186, 33176, 33193, and 33196

West Kendall is an unincorporated community in Miami-Dade County, Florida. The boundaries of West Kendall are imprecise, but locals commonly include the CDPs of Country Walk, Lakes of the Meadows, Three Lakes, The Hammocks, The Crossings, Kendale Lakes, and Kendall West. West Kendall mainly consists of planned communities, apartment buildings, and strip malls.

== Media ==
West Kendall is served by the Miami market for local radio and television. West Kendall is served by The West Kendall Gazette which is published twice monthly and is part of Miami's Community Newspapers, and West Kendall Today.com an online publication, which is partnered with the Miami Herald.

== Education ==
Miami-Dade County Public Schools operates public schools. Schools in West End include:

=== High schools ===
- Miami Sunset Senior High School
- G. Holmes Braddock Senior High School
- John A. Ferguson Senior High School
- Felix Varela Senior High School

=== Middle schools ===
- Arvida Middle School
- Hammocks Middle School
- Howard D. McMillan Middle School
- Jorge Mas Canosa Middle School
- Lamar Louise Curry Middle School
- Rockway Middle School

=== Magnet schools ===
- Miami Arts Studio 6-12 @ Zelda Glazer (6–12)
- Howard D. McMillan Middle School (STEAM magnet program)
- Bowman Ashe/Doolin K-8 Academy (STArts² magnet program)

=== K–8 schools ===
- Bowman Ashe/Doolin K-8 Academy
- Dante B. Fascell K-8 Center
- Ethel Koger Beckham K-8 Center
- Jane S. Roberts K-8 Center

=== Elementary schools ===
- Calusa Elementary School (Pre-K–5)
- Claude Pepper Elementary School (Pre-K–5)
- Dr. Manuel C. Barreiro Elementary School (Pre-K–5)
- Gilbert Porter Elementary School (Pre-K–5)
- Kendale Elementary School (Pre-K–5)
- Oliver Hoover Elementary School (Pre-K–5)

=== Charter schools ===
==== High schools ====
- Archimedean Upper Conservatory
- Pinecrest Preparatory Academy Middle/High School (6–12)

==== Charter middle schools ====
- Archimedean Middle Conservatory (6–8)

==== Elementary Charter schools ====
- Academir Preparatory Academy (Pre-K–5)
- Archimedean Academy (Pre-K–5)
- Somerset Academy (Kendall campus) (K–5)
- Pinecrest Preparatory Academy (K–5)

== Notable residents ==
- Jeanette Delgado – principal dancer with the Miami City Ballet; raised in West Kendall.
- Jon Jay – Major League Baseball outfielder and World Series champion with the St. Louis Cardinals (2011); graduate of Christopher Columbus High School (Miami) (2003).
- Marcello Hernández – comedian and cast member of Saturday Night Live; attended Belen Jesuit Preparatory School (2015).
- Marco Rubio – U.S. Secretary of State (2025); graduate of South Miami Senior High School (1989)
- Patricia Delgado – principal dancer with the Miami City Ballet; raised in West Kendall.

== See also ==
- West End (Florida)
