= West End, Florida =

- Motto: Fun Families, Friendly Neighbors, Fit Residents
- Interactive map of West End, Florida
- Coordinates: 25°37′56″N 80°26′6″W
- Country: United States
- State: Florida
- County: Miami-Dade
- Elevation: 6.6 ft (2 m)

Population (2010)
  - Total: 213,839
- Time zone: UTC-5 (Eastern (EST))
  - Summer (DST): UTC-4 (EDT)
- ZIP codes: 33175, 33183, 33184, 33185, 33186, 33193, 33194, 33196

The West End is a wholly unincorporated area in suburban Miami-Dade County, Florida, United States. It is the collection of communities within and adjacent to County Commission District 11. At the time of the 2010 census, there were 213,839 residents.

== Geography ==
The West End's boundaries are the Florida Turnpike to the east, Southwest 152nd Street to the south, Krome Avenue to the west, and Tamiami Trail (Southwest 8th Street) to the north. The area includes the census designated areas of The Hammocks, Country Walk, Kendall West, Kendale Lakes, Three Lakes, The Crossings and Tamiami.

== Demographics ==
In 2015, Commissioner Juan C. Zapata submitted a report called "West End Strategy: A Vision for the Future", which stated that West End residents account for 8.6% of Miami-Dade County's population -- it is the second-most populous district, behind Commission District 9. The West End had a 20.4% growth from 2000 to 2010. (It has an annual growth rate of 0.9%.) Since 2011, there has been an increase in new residents who have immigrated to the West End from other nations. The area has the lowest overall poverty rate of all districts in Miami-Dade County; only 7.7% of the West End population lives below poverty level, and this number has been decreasing since 2000. Furthermore, the West End also enjoys a low crime rate.

== Government and Infrastructure ==
There are five branches of the Miami-Dade County Public Library System that are spread out over the West End. The Miami-Dade Police Department operates the West District Station located in The Hammocks. Recreational space is varied and abundant with 35 parks in the area.

== Education ==
Miami-Dade County Public Schools has 17 elementary schools, five middle schools, five high schools and one K-8 center in the West End. Florida International University’s main campus is directly to the east of West End in University Park.

=== Elementary schools ===
- Dr. Bowman Foster Ashe Elementary School
- Dr. Bowman Foster Ashe Primary Learning Center
- Dr. Manuel Barreiro Elementary School
- Christina M. Eve Elementary School
- Dante B. Fascell Elementary School
- Dr. Carlos J. Finlay Elementary School
- Jack D. Gordon Elementary School
- Greenglade Elementary School
- Joe Hall Elementary School
- Oliver Hoover Elementary School
- Oliver Hoover Primary Learning Center
- Zora Neale Hurston Elementary School
- Kendale Lakes Elementary School
- Wesley Matthews Elementary School
- Claude Pepper Elementary School
- Dr. Gilbert Porter Elementary School
- Dr. Gilbert Porter Primary Learning Center
- Jane S. Roberts K-8 Center

=== Middle schools ===
- Lamar Louise Curry Middle School
- Zelda Glazer Middle School
- Hammocks Middle School
- Jorge Mas Canosa Middle School
- W.R. Thomas Middle School

=== High schools ===
- G. Holmes Braddock High School
- Archbishop Coleman F. Carroll High School
- John Ferguson High School
- Miami Sunset High School
- Felix Varela High School

=== Academies ===
- Pinecrest Academy South Charter
- Pinecrest Preparatory Academy
- Pinecrest Preparatory Middle-High

=== University ===
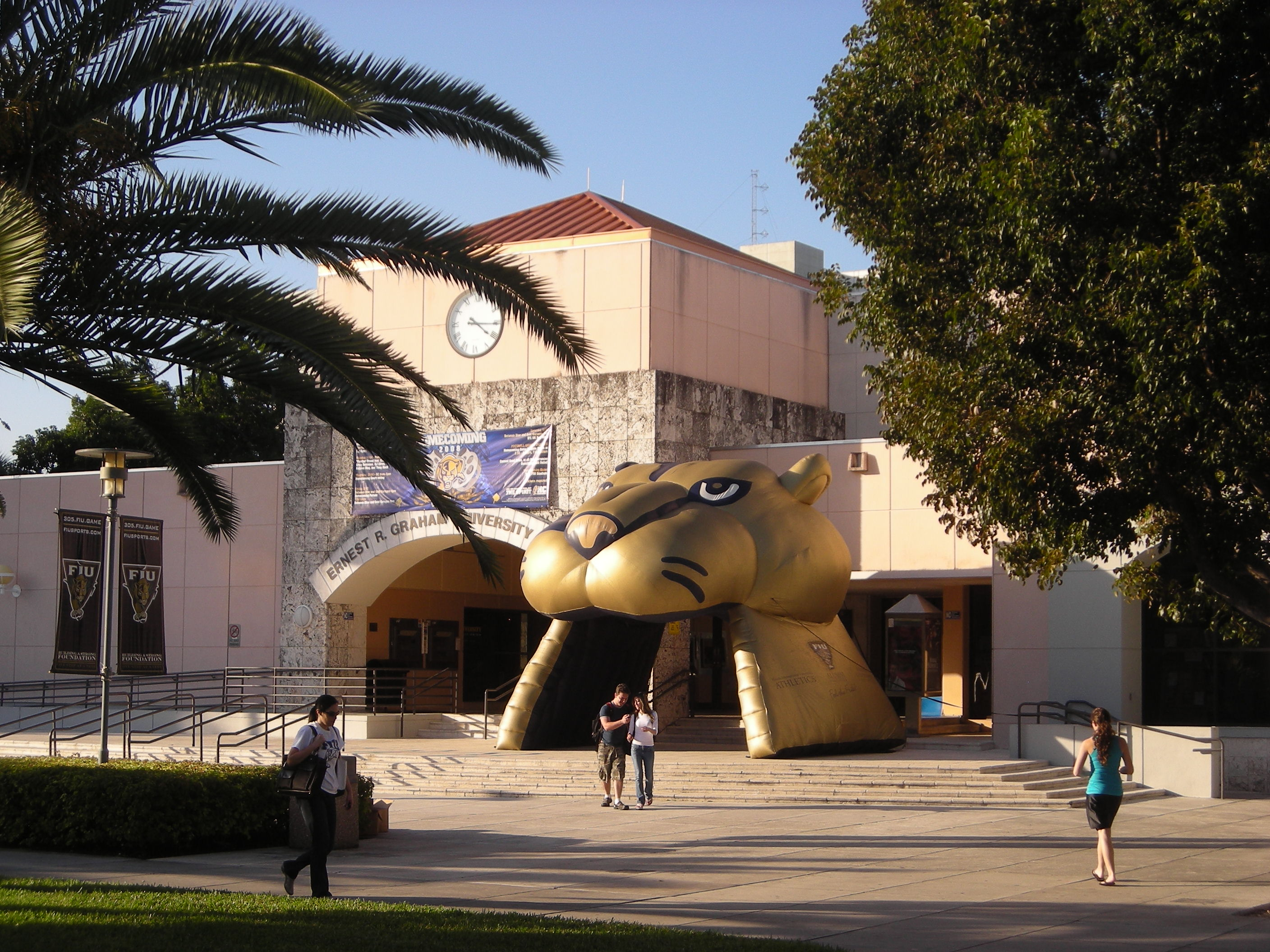
FIU plaza

- Florida International University

== Institutions ==
West Kendall Baptist Hospital is part of [Baptist_Health_South_Florida], a faith-based not-for-profit healthcare organization and clinical care network in South Florida. It opened in 2011 and provides medical and surgical services for patients that includes a critical care unit.

West End is home to a large population of senior citizens; thus, it has various senior centers.

- Garden Hills Retirement Center
- Olga Martinez Senior Center
- Montano Miriam-Visiting Angels Living Assistance
- Moya Jenny-Mount Olympus Senior Care and Activity Center
- Nana's Adult Day Care and Recreation Center
- Oasis Adult Care Corporation
- Senior Lift Center
- Sunrise Community

== Transportation ==
There are 13 bus routes provided by Miami-Dade County Transit throughout the West End. Miami Executive Airport is a public airport in the southwest of the West End. It is operated by the Miami-Dade Aviation Department and serves corporate and recreational aircraft. The airport also operates a flight training school and serves governmental agency activities. It also serves as the airbase for the Miami-Dade County Police Aviation Unit and houses Miami-Dade College's aviation programs. The Wings Over Miami Air Museum is located within the airport.

== Places of interest ==
The West End has a variety of attractions to offer its residents and visitors alike.

- Zoo Miami
- Wings over Miami
- Shark Valley Visitor Center
- The Frost Museum at FIU

== National Parks ==
1. Big Cypress National Preserve
2. Everglades National Park
3. Shark Valley Visitor Center

== Innovation District ==
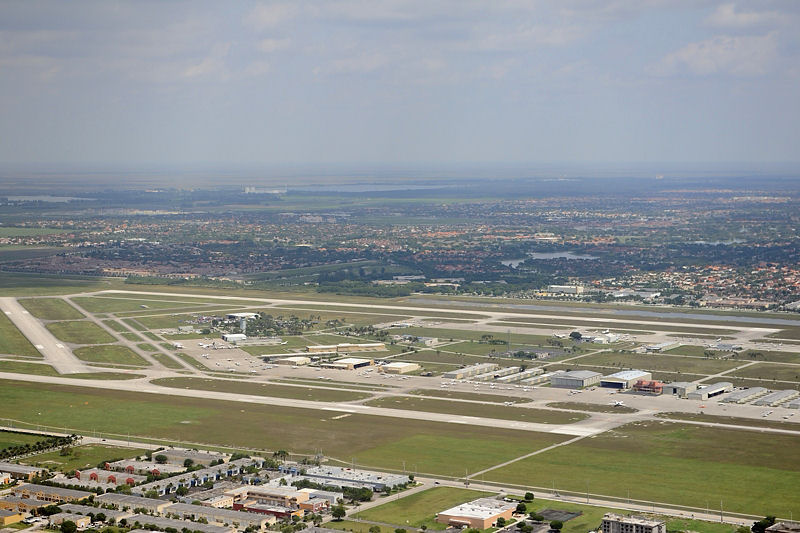
Miami Executive Airport

The Innovation District is an area within the West End that is focused around Miami Executive Airport. The area is projected to become mixed-use, with a focus on innovation and technology. Because the West End has the highest concentration of the professional workforce in Miami-Dade County, the site should attract professional jobs to the area, and provide a stable workforce of professionals who will not only work in the West End, but also live and play there as well.

== West End Community Image ==
The West End community image, created by artist Stephen Gamson, features a depiction of an outdoor family scene highlighting the area's character and proximity to the Everglades. Miami-Dade County Commissioner Juan C. Zapata is unveiling a new community image to promote the West End as a place for families, neighbors, and residents.

== Annual Events ==
- Holiday Magic features food trucks, bounce houses and other entertainment in the evening. It takes place from November to January.
- West End also hosts movie nights once a month every month from October through May.
- The West End Art Fair is a free event that features live entertainment, food trucks and activities for children. The main feature is the exhibition of artwork by local artists. Student artwork from local schools is also showcased.
