= Holy Cross Academy =

Holy Cross Academy may refer to:

Canada

- Holy Cross Catholic Academy, Vaughan, Ontario

Philippines

- Holy Cross Academy of Sasa, now Holy Cross College

United Kingdom

- Holy Cross Academy, Edinburgh, now St Augustine's High School

United States

- Holy Cross Academy (Florida), Miami-Dade County; closed
- Holy Cross Preparatory Academy, Burlington County, New Jersey
- Holy Cross Academy (Oneida, New York)
- Holy Cross Catholic Academy (Amarillo, Texas)

== See also ==
- Academy of the Holy Cross, North Bethesda, Maryland, United States
