= Colombian Americans =

Americans of Colombian birth or descent

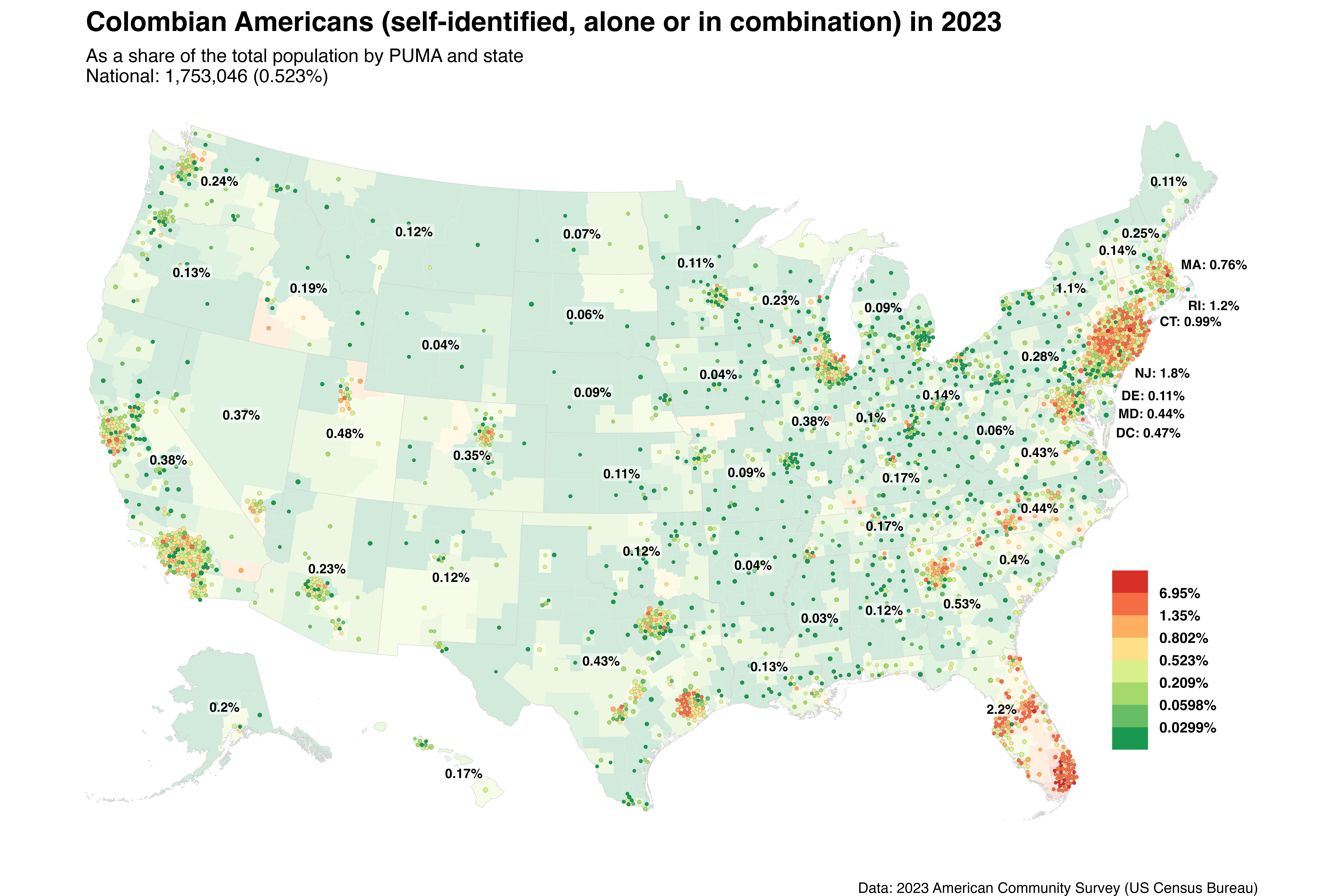

Total population
- 1,936,065 (incl. ancestry, 2025); 1,243,153 (by birth, 2025)

Regions with significant populations
- Over 35% concentrated in Florida, predominantly in Miami, as well as Tampa area and Orlando area Significant populations in New York City, Boston, Washington, D.C., Houston, Seattle and Los Angeles; Growing populations in Philadelphia, Chicago, Milwaukee, Raleigh, Greenville, Atlanta, Jacksonville, Louisville, Minneapolis–St. Paul, Dallas–Fort Worth, San Francisco, Denver and Las Vegas.

Languages
- Colombian Spanish, American English, Indigenous Languages, Spanglish

Religion
- Predominantly: Roman Catholicism Minority: Protestantism, Evangelicalism, Baptist, Judaism

Related ethnic groups
- Hispanic Americans, Afro-Colombians, White Colombians, Mestizo Colombians, Indigenous peoples in Colombia, Arab Colombians, Native Americans, Spanish Americans, Mexican Americans, Venezuelan Americans, Ecuadorian Americans, Filipino Americans, Indian Americans, Chinese Americans, Japanese Americans, Korean Americans, Vietnamese Americans, Turkish Americans, Armenian Americans, Malaysian Americans, Thai Americans

Colombian Americans (Spanish: colombo-estadounidenses or colombo-americanos), are Americans who have Colombian ancestry. The word may refer to someone born in the United States of full or partial Colombian descent or to someone who has immigrated to the United States from Colombia. Colombian Americans are the largest South American Hispanic group in the United States. There are currently two U.S. Senators of Colombian descent: Bernie Moreno of Ohio and Ruben Gallego of Arizona.

Many communities throughout the United States have significant Colombian American populations. Florida (826,391) has the highest concentration and population of Colombian Americans in the United States, followed by New York (311,685), New Jersey (300,637), Texas (134,865), and California (120,873).

== History ==
The first Colombian immigrants who settled in the United States likely arrived in the 1800s. However, the Colombian presence in the United States would not be known with certainty since the U.S. census included all the South Americans that lived in the United States in the "other Hispanics" category.

The first community of Colombian origin was formed after World War I, through the arrival of several hundred professionals (nurses, accountants, laboratory technicians, pharmacists, and bilingual secretaries) that established themselves in New York City; later on, more people were added to the community when Colombian students decided to stay in the U.S. after they finished their studies. Most immigrants settled in Manhattan for many years until the late 1970s when they started to migrate to Jackson Heights, a middle-class neighborhood in the borough of Queens in New York City, that has good housing, schools and churches. The growth of the Colombian population was slow until 1940, when there was an increase in Colombian immigration to New York.

=== Post-World War II ===
Most Colombians who arrived after the mid-1960s wanted to stay in the United States for a specific time period. Therefore, the number of undocumented Colombian immigrants increased: from 250,000 to 350,000 people in the mid-1970s. Despite the promulgation of many laws against immigration, the number of Colombians that immigrated to the United States did not stop growing. Most of them immigrated to New York. Smaller communities formed in Los Angeles, Houston, Philadelphia, and Washington, D.C., and in the 1970s, North Side, Chicago.

Since the 1980s, many Colombians have immigrated to Miami (especially in its suburbs, such as Doral, Kendall, and Hialeah, and the Weston suburb of Fort Lauderdale). The first Colombians immigrating to the city lived in Little Havana, from where they established commercial relations between Miami and Latin America. The area also attracted wealthy Colombians, who settled there for reasons as diverse as educational, medical or economics.

By the early 1990s, many Colombians left the metropolitan centers and settled in the suburbs to escape crime and high product prices in the city. This trend probably started for the first time in the coastal towns of Connecticut and New York. Colombian communities grew significantly in places such as Stamford, Union City and Englewood, New Jersey, Jacksonville, Florida (which attracted a growing number of people from Miami), and Skokie, Evanston, Arlington Heights and Park Ridge. Despite the migration to other areas, the largest communities remained in New York City, Miami, and their environs.

In 1990 and 1991, 124,745 Colombians legally immigrated to the United States, surpassing immigrants from the rest of Latin America. They were for the first time the most populous group of undocumented immigrants in the United States from Latin America, excluding Mexico. Between 1992 and 1997, the intensity of the conflict in Colombia increased, so nearly 190,000 Colombians immigrated to the United States in this period, many of them going to California.

=== Causes of migration ===
In Miville's "Colombians in the United States: History, Values, and Challenges," the nature of Colombian migration is described. She writes,"Colombian migration patterns have been distinguished by scholars as three distinct waves involving diverse demographic groups, reasons for migrating, and contextual factors with a mixture of push and pull factors from both the originating and host countries (Madrigal, 2013; Migration Policy Institute, 2015). Immigration to the United States was essentially minor from about 1820 to 1950 when fewer than 7000 Colombians immigrated to the United States. Indeed, the Colombian presence in the United States was not recognized officially until 1960, when the U.S. Census began to specify the country of origin for South Americans (Migration Policy Institute, 2015)." Economic problems and violence have led to an immigration of Colombians to the United States, particularly South Florida (especially in the suburbs of Miami, Florida such as Doral, Kendall, and Hialeah, and the Weston suburb of Fort Lauderdale), Central Florida, New Jersey (North Jersey), Queens County in New York City, Philadelphia, the Washington, D.C., metro area, eastern Long Island, and an expanding community in California, Texas and Georgia, mainly in the Los Angeles, Houston and Atlanta areas.

First Wave: After World War I, many Colombians immigrated to the United States in order to complete their education there, studying at the universities of the country. Most of them settled in New York. Many Colombians immigrated to the United States in order to complete their education, studying in universities across the country (Madrigal, 2013; Sassen-Koob, 1989). After the civil war in 1948 and increased poverty in Colombia, many Colombians also immigrated to the United States during the 1950s. In the 1960s, the economic crisis prompted the immigration of many Colombians to the United States, obtaining U.S. citizenship Between 1960 and 1977.

Second Wave (1965–1989): "The passage of several U.S. Immigration and Naturalization Act's amendments in 1965 allowed for more Colombians to migrate to the United States (Madrigal, 2013)"

Third Wave (1990–2008): "The 1980s and 1990s brought the rise in cocaine trafficking, along with the influence of the drug cartels and paramilitary groups (Carvajal, 2017; Migration Policy Institute, 2015). From the 1990s, along with the ensuing turmoil over a political assassination in 1989, the number of Colombians admitted to the United States tripled, representing the largest numbers of immigrants from a South American country (Carvajal, 2017; Migration Policy Institute, 2015)" Since the 1980s, many Colombians fled their urban cities to migrate to suburban areas in states like New Jersey and Connecticut, as their socioeconomic status improved. The conflict escalation between terrorists, paramilitaries, and narcos between 1992 and 1997 also boosted Colombian emigration during this period. As was discussed earlier, about 75,000 Colombians immigrated at that time to the United States, concentrating mostly in the state of California.

== Demographics ==
As of the 2000 Census, 278,600 Colombians were living in the New York metro area and 213,200 Colombians were living in the Miami metropolitan area. The largest Colombian community lives in the South Florida area (Doral, Kendall, Weston, and Country Club) and Jackson Heights in Queens County, New York City.

In New York City, a large Colombian community thrives and continues to expand in size since the wave of immigration began in the 1970s. Jackson Heights in Queens County was heavily Colombian during the 1980s, but other immigrant groups have settled in the area, notably Ecuadoreans and Mexicans. Many of the displaced Colombians have moved to adjacent areas such as Elmhurst, East Elmhurst, Corona, while wealthier Colombian Immigrants have gone further afield to College Point and Flushing. Queens County still has the second largest concentration of Colombians in the United States of any county (roughly 155,000).

In 2021, Pew Research Center found that, as far as gender demographics are concerned, women in the United States have made up about 55.7% of Colombian migrants, while men have made up about 44.3% of the Colombian migrant population.

=== Ancestry ===
Ethnically, Colombian Americans are a diverse population including Colombians of European (mainly Spanish) ancestry, Mestizo (mixed Amerindian-European), Afro-Colombians, and Colombians of Indigenous ancestry. In addition, many Colombians of Middle Eastern descent, notably Lebanese Colombians, also compose the Colombian diaspora.

Until 1960, most Colombians immigrating to the United States were white or mestizos. However, between this year and 1977, a period in which more than 186,000 Colombians immigrated to the United States, are becoming more ethnically diverse, representing the ethnic diversity of the population of Colombia. So today, most Colombians consist of white, mestizo, indigenous, and Afro-Colombian ancestry.

=== U.S. states with the largest Colombian American populations ===
State/Territory	Colombian American Population (2020 estimate)	Percentage
Alabama	6,286	0.0%
Alaska	1,406	0.1%
Arizona	14,229	0.2%
Arkansas	1,117	0.0%
California	152,832	0.4%
Colorado	19,982	0.3%
Connecticut	70,219	2.0%
Delaware	2,117	0.1%
District of Columbia	8,074	1.1%
Florida	826,391	3.8%
(Georgia (U.S. state)) Georgia	51,370	0.5%
Hawaii	2,450	0.1%
Idaho	3,839	0.2%
Illinois	42,101	0.3%
Indiana	6,809	0.0%
Iowa	2,826	0.1%
Kansas	4,423	0.1%
Kentucky	6,143	0.1%
Louisiana	5,038	0.1%
Maine	1,309	0.0%
Maryland	23,216	0.4%
Massachusetts	84,774	1.2%
Michigan	9,219	0.0%
Minnesota	8,665	0.1%
Mississippi	1,831	0.0%
Missouri	4,809	0.1%
Montana	541	0.0%
Nebraska	1,604	0.1%
Nevada	13,391	0.4%
New Hampshire	8,684	0.6%
New Jersey	300,637	3.3%
New Mexico	4,293	0.1%
New York	311,685	1.6%
North Carolina	40,731	0.4%
North Dakota	715	0.1%
Ohio	16,882	0.1%
Oklahoma	5,482	0.1%
Oregon	5,455	0.1%
Pennsylvania	31,355	0.2%
Rhode Island	23,659	2.2%
South Carolina	20,116	0.4%
South Dakota	379	0.0%
Tennessee	10,846	0.1%
Texas	134,865	0.4%
Utah	16,095	0.5%
Vermont	656	0.1%
Virginia	33,291	0.4%
Washington	17,762	0.2%
West Virginia	768	0.0%
Wisconsin	11,129	0.2%
Wyoming	309	0.0%
United States	1,628,927	0.7%

=== U.S. metropolitan areas with the largest Colombian American populations ===
The largest populations of Colombians are situated in the following metropolitan areas (Source: 2023 estimate):

1. New York-Northern New Jersey-Long Island, NY-NJ-PA-CT MSA – 601,729
2. Miami-Fort Lauderdale-West Palm Beach, FL MSA – 536,283
3. Orlando-Kissimmee-Sanford, FL MSA – 148,441
4. Tampa-St. Petersburg-Clearwater, FL MSA – 94,507
5. Los Angeles-Long Beach-Santa Ana, CA MSA – 81,247
6. Boston-Cambridge-Newton, MA-NH Metro Area – 78,998
7. Houston-Sugar Land-Baytown, TX MSA – 69,227
8. San Francisco-Oakland-Fremont, CA MSA - 55,026
9. Washington-Arlington-Alexandria, DC-VA-MD-WV MSA – 54,476
10. Atlanta-Sandy Springs-Marietta, GA MSA – 46,661
11. Chicago-Joliet-Naperville, IL-IN-WI MSA - 37,841
12. Philadelphia-Camden-Wilmington, PA-NJ-DE-MD MSA - 33,373
13. Dallas-Fort Worth, TX-OK - 31,624

=== U.S. cities with the largest Colombian American populations ===
The top 25 U.S. communities with the most residents born in Colombia are (2024):

1. Elizabeth, New Jersey 29.3%
2. Kendall, Florida 26.4%
3. Victory Gardens, New Jersey 25.2%
4. Country Club, Florida 20.9%
5. Dover, New Jersey 20.5%
6. The Hammocks, Florida 19.7%
7. Pembroke Pines, Florida 19.5%
8. Ojus, Florida 19.4%
9. Katonah, New York 18.4%
10. Weston, Florida 18.5%
11. Aventura, Florida 17.7%
12. Sunny Isles Beach, Florida 17.3%
13. Guttenberg, New Jersey 16.9%
14. Wharton, New Jersey 16.4%
15. Doral, Florida 16.2%
16. Shinnecock Hills, New York 15.8%
17. Kendall West, Florida 15.7%
18. Westchester, Florida 15.4%
19. Katonah, New York 14.6%
20. Central Falls, Rhode Island 14.4%
21. Revere, Massachusetts 13.9%
22. Hampton Bays, New York 12.5%
23. Byram, Connecticut 11.6%
24. North Bay Village, Florida 11.2%
25. Greenbriar, Florida 10.8%

== Notable people ==
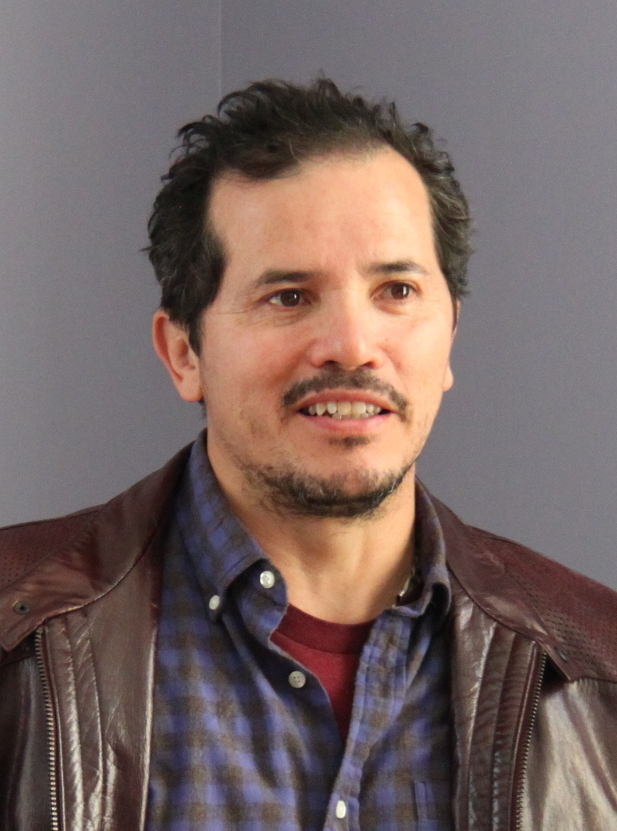
John Leguizamo

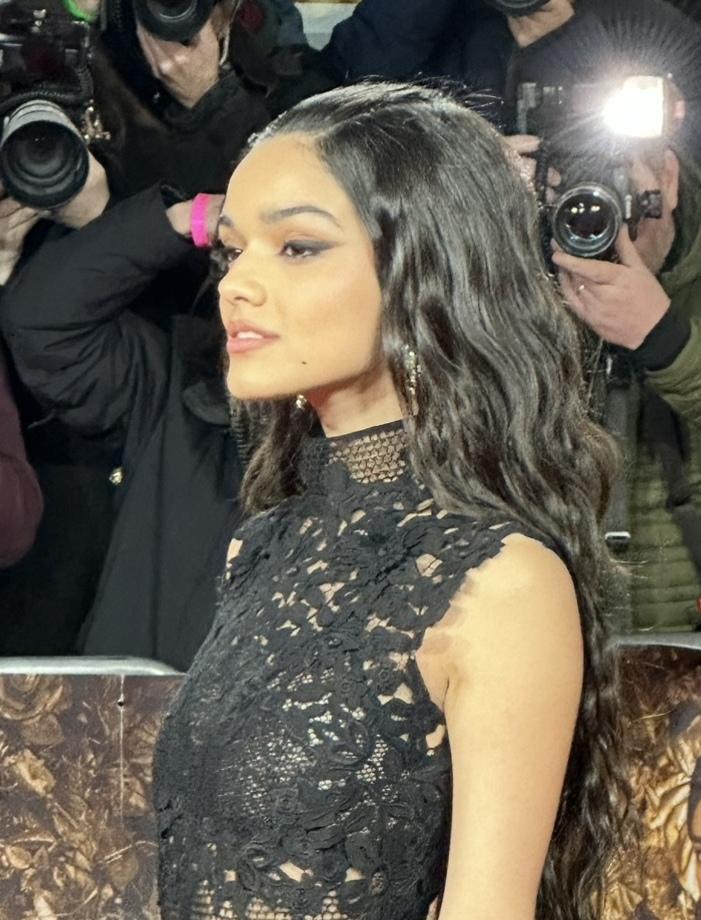
Rachel Zegler

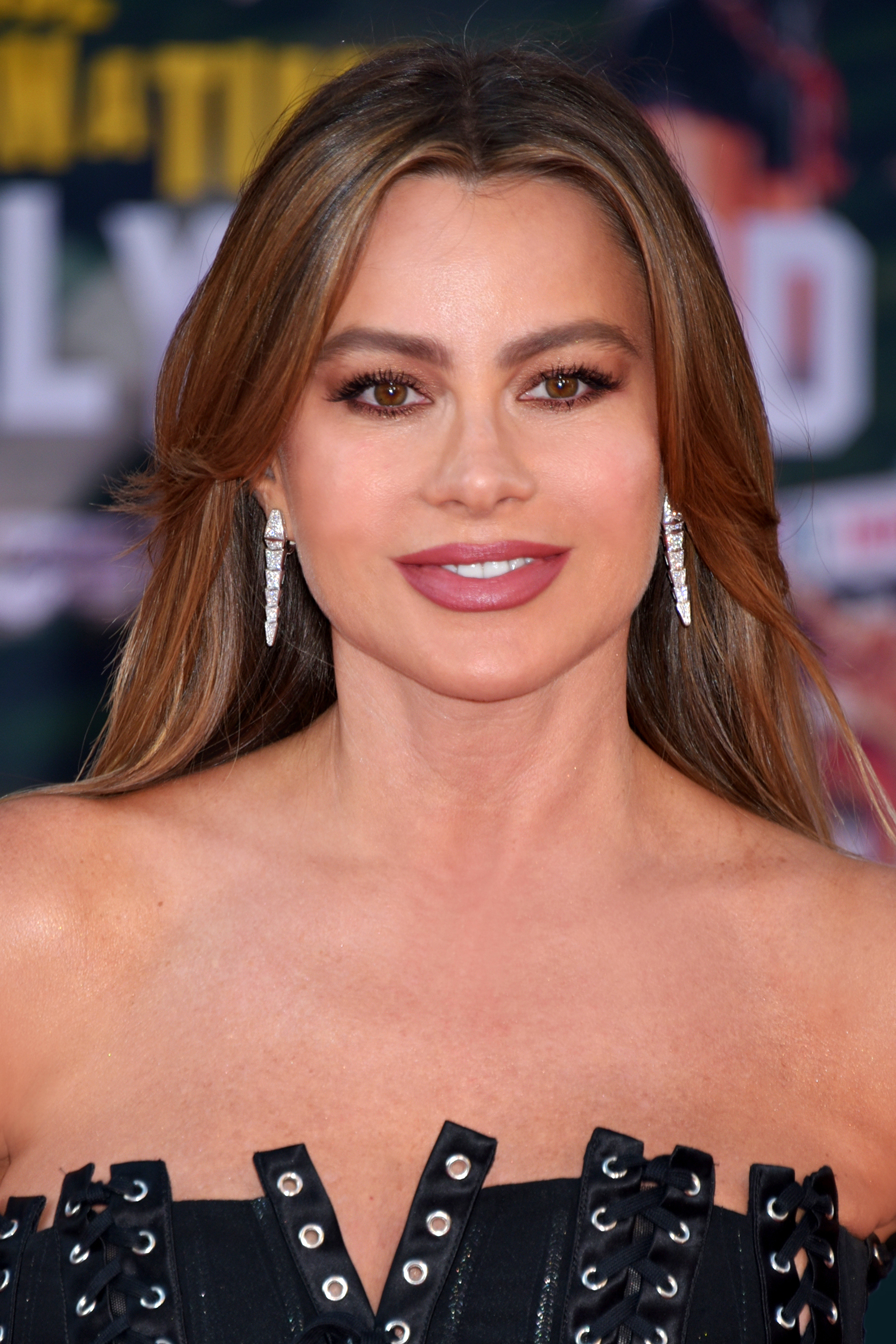
Sofía Vergara

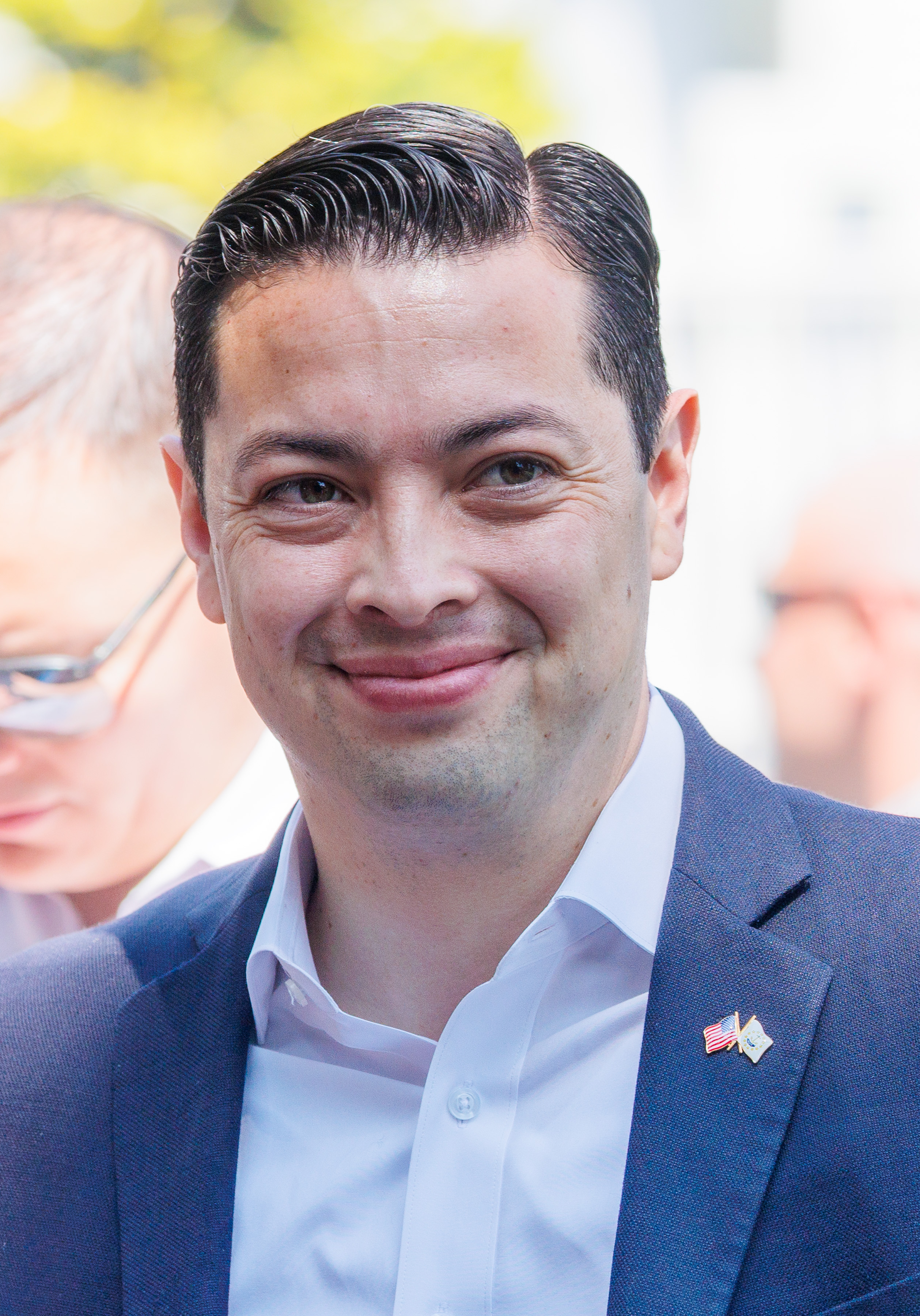
James Diossa

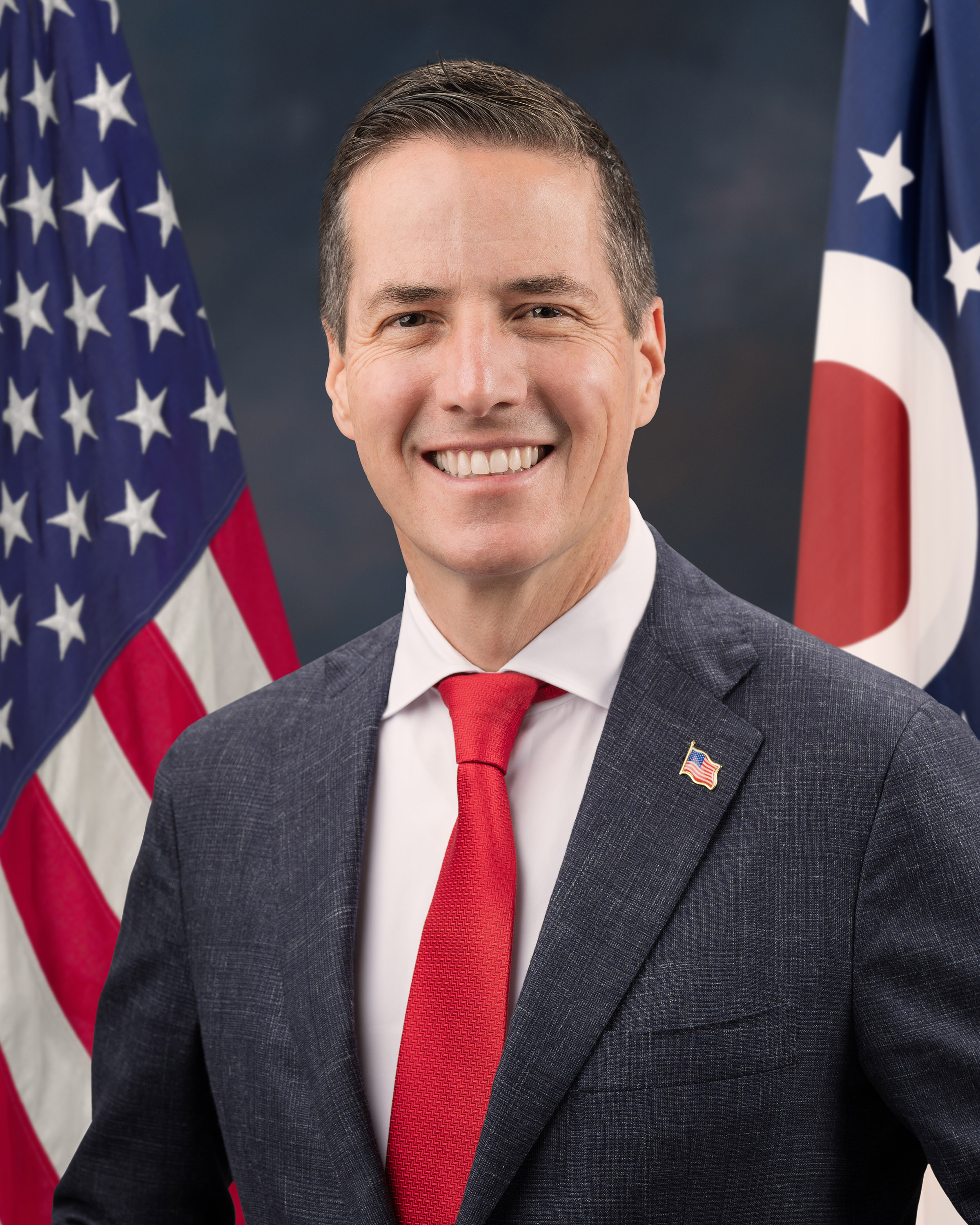
Bernie Moreno

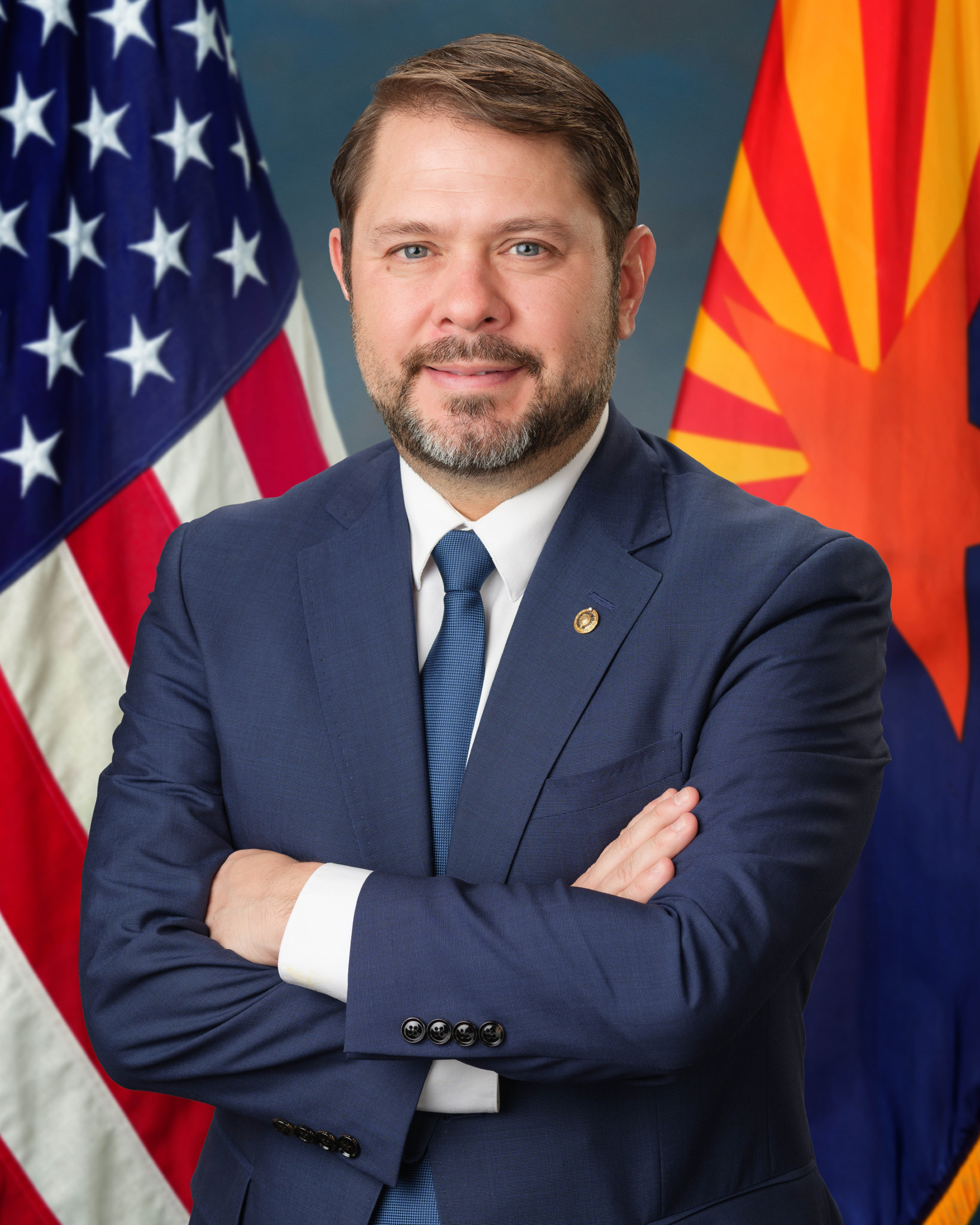
Ruben Gallego

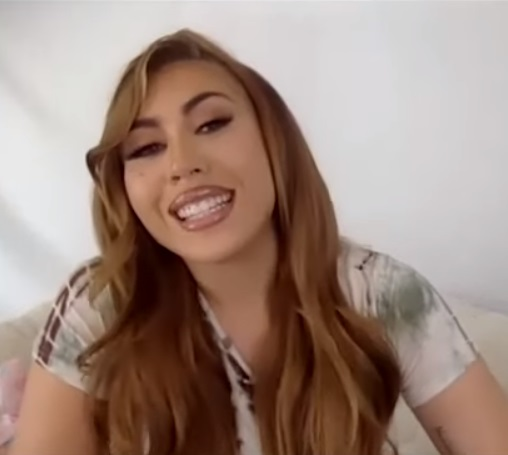
Kali Uchis

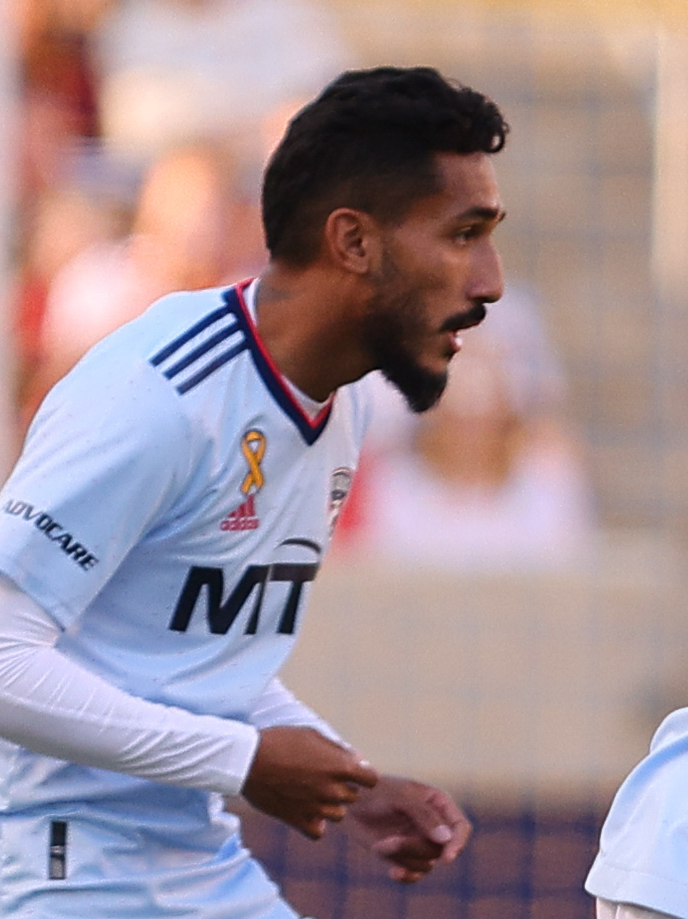
Jesús Ferreira

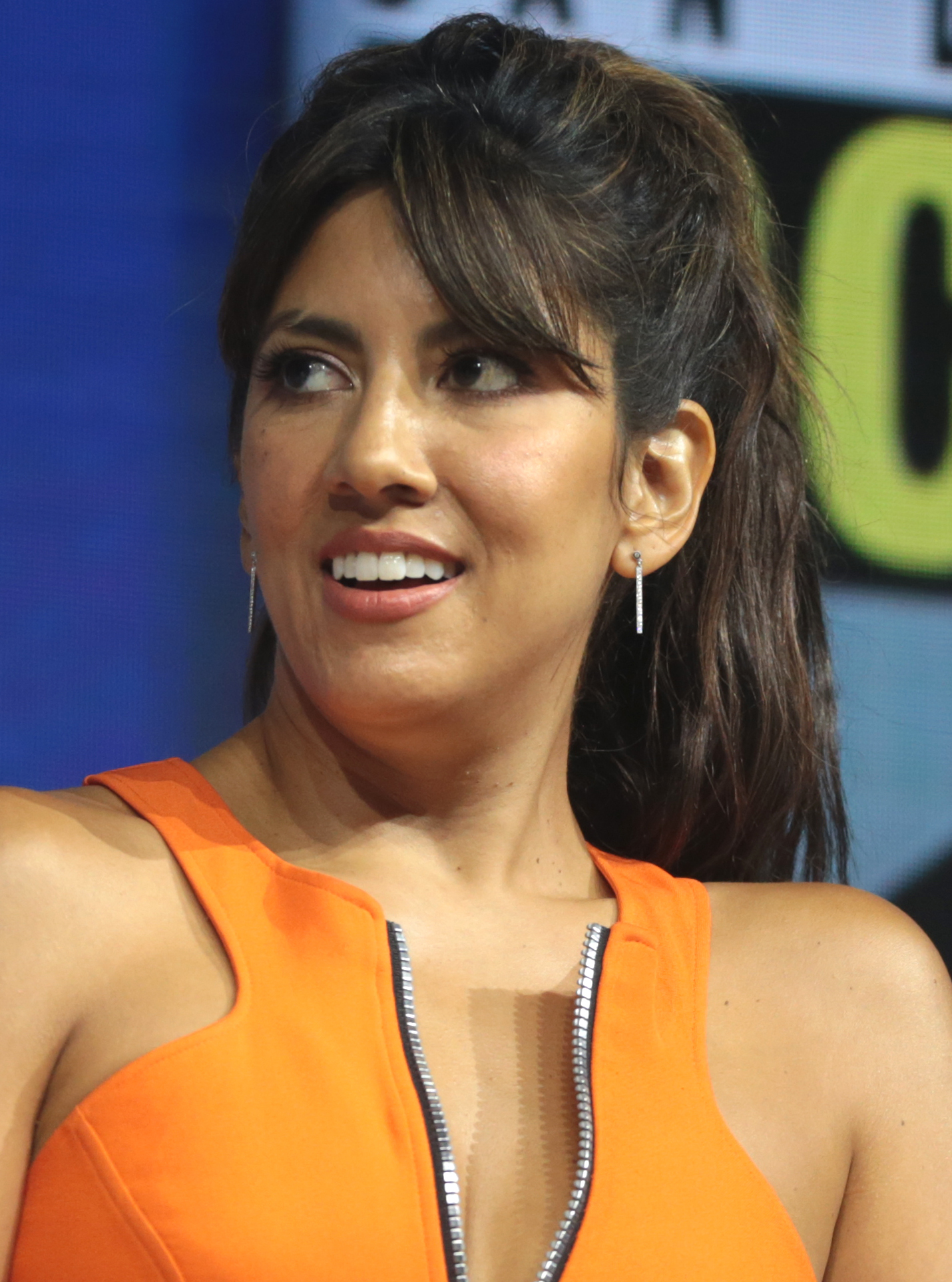
Stephanie Beatriz

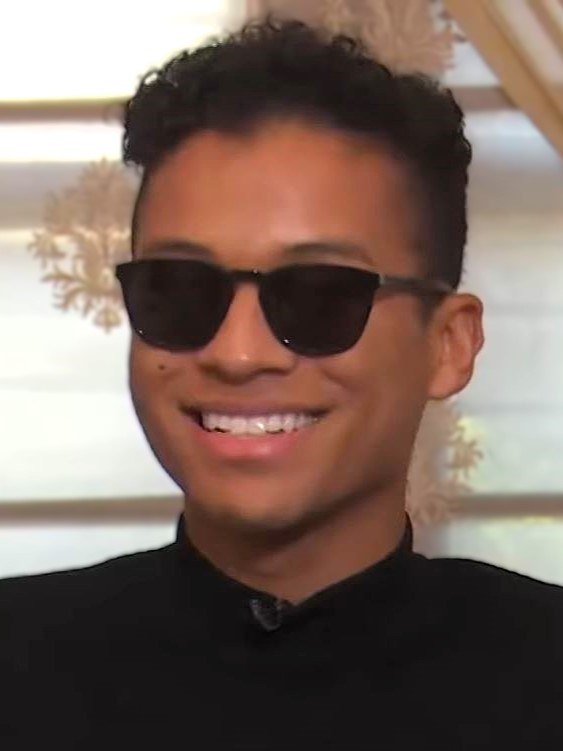
Jaafar Jackson

== See also ==
- German Colombian
- Italian Colombian
- Lebanese Colombians
- Colombia–United States relations
