= Lycée Alexandre Dumas (disambiguation) =

Lycée Alexandre Dumas is a French international school in Port-au-Prince, Haiti.

Lycée Alexandre Dumas may also refer to:

- Lycée Alexandre Dumas (Saint-Cloud), in Hauts-de-Seine, France
- Lycée International Alexandre Dumas, in Algiers, Algeria
- Lycée Français Alexandre Dumas de Moscou, in Moscow, Russia
- Lycée Alexandre Dumas (LAD), in Port-au-Prince, Haiti
