= John A. Ferguson Senior High School =

Location
- 15900 SW 56th Street; Miami, Florida; United States
- 25°42′45″N 80°27′08″W

Information
- Type: Public Secondary School
- Motto: "No Goal's Too High, Where Falcons Fly!"
- Established: August 2003
- School district: Miami-Dade County Public Schools
- Principal: Wendy Barnett (2021-present)
- Teaching staff: 164.00 (FTE)
- Grades: 9–12
- Enrollment: 4,389 (2023–24)
- Campus: Suburban
- Color
- Mascot: Falcon
- National ranking: 1690th in National Rankings
- School hours: 7:20 AM to 2:20 PM
- Average class size: 28
- Buildings: Appx. 12
- Website: fergusonhs.org
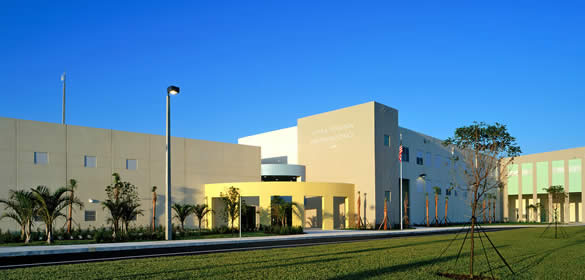
- Long shot of entrance.

John A. Ferguson Senior High School is a certified magnet and academy high school located at 15900 SW 56th Street in Kendall West, Florida, United States (Miami postal address). This Miami-Dade County public school mainly serves the outer portion of Kendall West, a suburb of Miami. The school's principal was Rafael Villalobos from 2003 to 2021, and Wendy Barnett since 2021.

Construction began on Ferguson in March 2002. It was built to alleviate overcrowding at G. Holmes Braddock High School and Felix Varela High School, which had reached populations of over 5,000 students. Classes began in summer 2003 hosting only a freshman class. For the first three nine-week periods, students were housed at G. Holmes Braddock Senior High School. John A. Ferguson High School now has one of the highest student populations in Florida, at over 4,255.

The school is named after a local clergyman who graduated from Carver Senior High School in 1941 and served with the United States Navy for 21 years during World War II and the Korean War.

== Campus ==
The school is in West Kendall, a census-designated place in unincorporated Miami-Dade County, Florida. It has a Miami, Florida postal address.

== Demographics ==
Ferguson High is 90% Hispanic, 6% white, 1% black and 3% Asian.

== Sports ==
Fall sports are bowling, cross country, football, golf, swimming and diving, and volleyball (girls').

Winter sports are basketball (boys' and girls'), soccer (boys' and girls'), and wrestling.

Spring sports are badminton, baseball, football, softball, tennis, track and field, volleyball (boys'), and flag football (girls').

== Music ==
The Mighty Falcon Marching Band has qualified for state competition many times. The Ferguson Wind Ensemble and Jazz Bands have received Superior rankings at district, state and national levels. The band performs all over the country, including in Los Angeles, New York City, Chicago, and Atlanta.

The Falcon Choir was scheduled to perform in the 2012 London Olympics, representing the United States, but could not go due to insufficient funds.
