= Simulated Society =

Simulated Society (or SimSoc, pronounced sim-sock) is a "game" used by universities and other groups to teach various aspects of sociology, political science, and communications skills. Originally created by William A. Gamson in 1966, it is currently in its fifth edition. It provides a way for participants to better understand the problems of governing a 20th-century-style nation state society. The participants grapple with issues like economic inequality, justice, diversity, trust, power dynamics, and leadership as they negotiate their way through labor-management relations, political turmoil, and natural disasters. To be successful, players must utilize basic social processes from cooperation and reward to threat and punishment. The goal of SIMSOC is to bring a deeper understanding of everyday experiences as well as social and organizational theory.
