= Felix Varela Senior High School =

Location
- 15255 SW 96th St; Miami, Florida 33196; United States
- 25.6777°N 80.4428°W

Information
- Type: Public secondary
- Established: August 28, 2000
- School district: Miami-Dade County Public Schools
- Principal: Adrian M. Sánchez
- Teaching staff: 84.00 (FTE)
- Grades: 9–12
- Enrollment: 2,006 (2023–2024)
- Student to teacher ratio: 23.88
- Campus: Suburban
- Colors: Hunter Green, Black and Silver
- Mascot: Viper
- Average class size: 35
- Founding principal: Millie Fornell
- Website: Felix Varela High School

Felix Varela Senior High School is a public high school located at 15255 SW 96th St. in The Hammocks, unincorporated Miami-Dade County, Florida, United States.

Past principals include Millie Fornell (2000–2005), Connie Navarro (2005–2011), and Nery Fins (2011–2023). The current principal is Adrian M. Sánchez (2023–present)

The school was named after Father Félix Varela (1788–1853), a Cuban Roman Catholic Priest, human rights advocate, teacher, and an admired figure throughout the Cuban American exile community.

The school opened its doors to approximately 2,000 9th and 10th graders (classes of 2003–2004) on August 28, 2000.

The school is accredited by the Southern Association of Colleges and Schools.

== History ==
Varela was built as an overcrowding relief school for G. Holmes Braddock High School and Miami Sunset High School. Construction began in 1998 but due to delays during construction (mainly on concerning funding and local area politics), the school's opening date was delayed and pushed back several times. Varela opened its doors to students on August 28, 2000.

In 2010, the school enrolled 51 survivors of the 2010 Haiti earthquake, the second highest number of any Miami-Dade school. Principal Connie Navarro had installed extra counselors to assist the students in case they had any trauma. The students mostly came from the middle and upper classes, and many had previously attended the Lycée Alexandre Dumas French international school and the Union School, both private schools. Varela High installed extra Advanced Placement (AP) classes, including AP French, to cater to them. Michael Winerip of The New York Times interviewed 10 survivors at Varela. They all spoke Haitian Creole, French, and English, and their English did not have any accent. They all indicated that the academic work at Varela was less rigorous than the work at their private Haitian schools.

== Demographics ==
Felix Varela is 89% Hispanic, 7% White non-Hispanic, 3% Black, and 1% Asian. As of 2019 the school had 2,595 students.

== Academics ==
The school offers Advanced Placement (AP), university preparatory, and dual enrollment programs. The school has a barn with livestock used for its veterinary training course. Students in the program often arrive at school early to perform their duties.

There are several professional programs offered at Varela including some magnet programs, such as iPrep program that focuses on the use of technology to enhance learning.

== Athletics and extracurricular activities ==
The varsity sports program began with the 2001–2002 school year alongside its first junior class.

Felix Varela High's athletic rivals include G. Holmes Braddock High School, Miami Sunset High School and John A. Ferguson High School, as well as the new Kendall school, TERRA Environmental Research Institute.

Around 2010–2011 the Varela tennis team reached its first ever regional playoff. Three of its new players, Zahry Edmond, Nicolas Etienne, and Hans Hillel Rousseau, were highly ranked tennis players in Haiti who had been displaced by the 2010 earthquake.

Athletic Director is Coach Ryan Schneider. Past Athletic Directors include Coach Ron Balazs (2000–2005) and Coach Andy Chiles (2005–2009).

The Varela High School Band is known as the "Band of Mystery."

Varela also has an Alethic Training program students can join to actively learn about the field of sports medicine. Thanks to the myriad of sports offered, students will get an extensive look into sports medicine and its role in athletics.

=== Championships ===
Boys' Varsity soccer team:

- 2008 National Champions
- 2008 FHSAA Class 6A State Champions by defeating Weston Cypress Bay 1-1 (4-1 PK). (back-to-back State Champions)
- 2007 FHSAA Class 6A State Champions by defeating Wellington High School 2-1 (the school's first state championship throughout its six-year history in varsity sports)

== Notable alumni ==
- Blake Jenner – actor on the television musical show Glee
- Johnny Barbato – former MLB pitcher

== See also ==
- Miami-Dade County Public Schools
- Education in the United States
