= Archimedean Upper Conservatory =

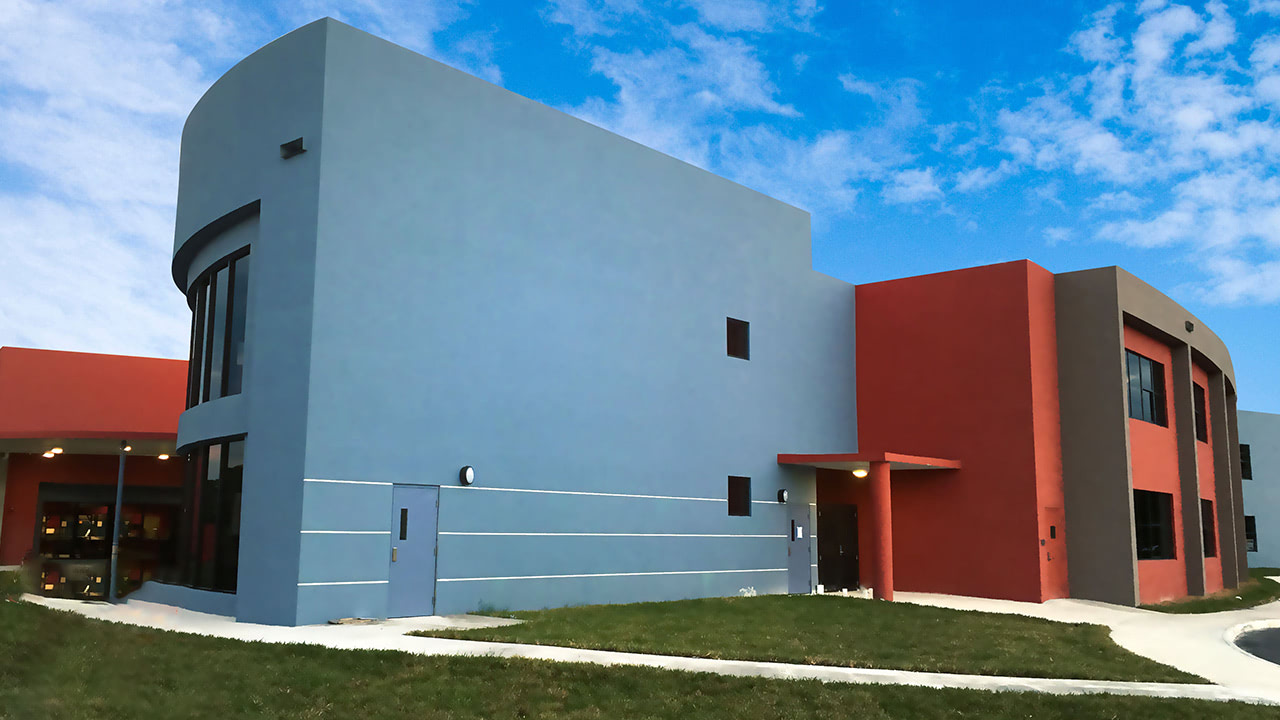
- The AUC main building

Location
- 12425 SW 72nd Street; Miami, Florida 33183; United States; 25°42′4.8″N 80°23′38.3″W

Information
- Type: Public charter school
- Motto: Knowledge is freedom
- Established: 2008
- School district: Miami-Dade County Public Schools
- Grades: 9–12
- Enrollment: 324 (2024–2025)
- Student to teacher ratio: 14:1
- Website: www.archimedean.org

Archimedean Upper Conservatory (often abbreviated AUC) is a public charter school serving grades nine through twelve in the Kendale Lakes suburb of Miami, Florida, United States. The school operates under the authorization of Miami-Dade County Public Schools and is part of the Archimedean Schools network, with which it shares a campus. Archimedean Upper Conservatory emphasizes a rigorous college-preparatory curriculum with a focus on mathematics, logic, and classical studies. As of 2025, it is ranked as the best public high school in Miami-Dade County, and is among the top 50 highest-rated high schools in the nation.

The school admits students through a lottery system when applications exceed capacity and does not charge tuition.

== History ==
The Archimedean School system, which includes an elementary and middle school, was first established in 2004 following its acquisition of the Holy Cross Academy campus. Archimedean Upper Conservatory opened in 2008, primarily serving students from within the system as admissions rose.

The school was founded by a group of educators and community members with the goal of creating a public charter school centered on academic rigor, critical thinking, and classical educational principles through Greek language. The school operates as a publicly funded charter institution overseen by a governing board and authorized by Miami-Dade County Public Schools.

== Academic program ==
Archimedean Upper Conservatory offers a structured and academically intensive curriculum designed to exceed Florida’s graduation requirements. The program integrates advanced mathematics, classical logic, and elements of Greek language and culture within a traditional American college-preparatory framework. Emphasis is placed on analytical reasoning, academic discipline, and preparation for post-secondary education.

Students typically complete coursework beyond state minimum requirements and are encouraged to pursue accelerated academic pathways. College counseling and academic advising support students in preparing for higher education.

== Rankings and recognition ==
Archimedean Upper Conservatory has received recognition in multiple school rankings for academic performance and college readiness, including U.S. News & World Report and Niche.

In the 2026 U.S. News & World Report Best High Schools rankings, Archimedean Upper Conservatory was ranked 39th nationally among approximately 17,900 public high schools in the United States. The school was ranked 1st among public high schools in Miami-Dade County and 3rd in the state of Florida.

== Student body ==
As of the 2024–2025 academic year, Archimedean Upper Conservatory enrolled approximately 324 students in grades 9 through 12, with a student-to-teacher ratio of about 14:1. Students are drawn from across Miami-Dade County through the school’s charter enrollment process.

== Extracurricular activities ==
Archimedean Upper Conservatory offers a variety of extracurricular opportunities for students, with a focus on academic clubs and student organizations. It most prominently supports math and science competitions, debate and Model United Nations teams, music ensembles, and community service initiatives.
