= Greenbriar, Florida =

- Census-designated place & Unincorporated community
- Location within Florida
- Coordinates: 28°00′41″N 82°45′02″W
- Country: United States
- State: Florida
- County: Pinellas

Area
  - Total: 0.64 sq mi (1.65 km^{2})
  - Land: 0.60 sq mi (1.55 km^{2})
  - Water: 0.035 sq mi (0.09 km^{2})
- Elevation: 56 ft (17 m)

Population (2020)
  - Total: 2,696
  - Density: 4,495.4/sq mi (1,735.68/km^{2})
- Time zone: UTC-5 (Eastern (EST))
  - Summer (DST): UTC-4 (EDT)
- Area code: 727
- FIPS code: 12-27360
- GNIS feature ID: 2583349

Greenbriar is an unincorporated community and census-designated place (CDP) in Pinellas County, Florida, United States. As of the 2020 census, Greenbriar had a population of 2,696.

== Geography ==
Greenbriar is bordered by the city of Dunedin to the north and west, the city of Clearwater to the east, and by unincorporated Pinellas County land to the south.

According to the United States Census Bureau, the CDP has a total area of 0.62 square miles (1.6 km^{2}), of which 0.58 square miles (1.5 km^{2}) is land and 0.04 square miles (0.1 km^{2}) (5.82%) is water.

== Demographics ==
Historical population
Census	Pop.	Note	%±
2020	2,696		—
U.S. Decennial Census

Greenbriar first appeared as a census designated place in the 2010 U.S. census.

=== 2020 census ===
As of the 2020 census, Greenbriar had a population of 2,696. The median age was 47.6 years. 14.8% of residents were under the age of 18 and 24.4% of residents were 65 years of age or older. For every 100 females there were 91.5 males, and for every 100 females age 18 and over there were 86.5 males age 18 and over.

100.0% of residents lived in urban areas, while 0.0% lived in rural areas.

There were 1,223 households in Greenbriar, of which 20.9% had children under the age of 18 living in them. Of all households, 45.5% were married-couple households, 17.7% were households with a male householder and no spouse or partner present, and 28.3% were households with a female householder and no spouse or partner present. About 32.4% of all households were made up of individuals and 16.7% had someone living alone who was 65 years of age or older.

There were 1,303 housing units, of which 6.1% were vacant. The homeowner vacancy rate was 3.1% and the rental vacancy rate was 6.6%.

Racial composition as of the 2020 census
Race	Number	Percent
White	2,205	81.8%
Black or African American	71	2.6%
American Indian and Alaska Native	7	0.3%
Asian	86	3.2%
Native Hawaiian and Other Pacific Islander	1	0.0%
Some other race	81	3.0%
Two or more races	245	9.1%
Hispanic or Latino (of any race)	294	10.9%
