= Holy Cross Academy (Florida) =

Defunct school in Florida, United States

Coordinates: 25°42′3.6″N 80°23′41.8″W

Holy Cross Academy was a Catholic school in Kendale Lakes census-designated place, unincorporated Miami-Dade County, Florida. It was in the West Kendall area, near Kendall.

It was owned and operated independently of the Roman Catholic Archdiocese of Miami. It incorporated a monastery.

It had a 10-acre (4.0 ha) campus and served grades kindergarten through 12.

== History ==
Reverend Abbott Gregory Wendt established the school in 1985. It started as an institution affiliated with the Ruthenian Greek Catholic Church. Its accreditation records circa 2004, however, described it as an independent Catholic institution.

Prior to 2001 the average enrollment was about 500. On March 25, 2001, Ukrainian Mykhaylo Kofel murdered nun-in-training Michelle Lewis; authorities discovered her body in the convent house on campus. Kofel pleaded guilty in 2005 and was scheduled to have a thirty-year sentence. Prosecutors initially sought the death penalty but no longer pursued it after Kofel made allegations of sexual abuse against the monastery priests. This accusation caused multiple parents to send their children to other schools, and the average post-murder enrollment was 340. Circa 2004 there were 37 people in the school's faculty. The school closed in 2004, and the charter school Archimedean Academy acquired the campus.

== Operations ==
Circa 2004 the yearly tuition was $6,525.

== Academic performance ==
Luisa Yanez of the Miami Herald wrote that Holy Cross "enjoyed a stellar academic reputation."
