= William A. Gamson =

American sociologist (1934–2021)

William Anthony Gamson (January 27, 1934 – March 23, 2021) was a professor of sociology at Boston College, where he was also the co-director of the Media Research and Action Project (MRAP). He is the author of numerous books and articles on political discourse, the mass-media and social movements from as early as the 1960s. His influential works include Power and Discontent (1968), The Strategy of Social Protest (1975), Encounters with Unjust Authority (1982) and Talking Politics (2002), as well as numerous editions of SIMSOC.

Gamson received his Ph.D. in 1959 from the University of Michigan, where he taught from 1962 until 1982. In 1962, he won the AAAS Prize for Behavioral Science Research. He is also a 1978 recipient of a Guggenheim Fellowship; that same year, he was a fellow at the Stanford Center for Advanced Study in the Behavioral Sciences. He became the 85th president of the American Sociological Association (ASA) in 1994. His awards include the ASA's Distinguished Contributions to Teaching Award in 1987, the Distinguished Career award from the ASA Section on Peace and War in 1997, the McCarthy Lifetime Achievement Award from the Center for the Study of Social Movements In 2011, and the ASA's W.E.B. Du Bois Career of Distinguished Scholarship Award by the American Sociological Association in 2012.

Gamson was a leader and organizer of the 1965 anti-Vietnam War teach-in at the University of Michigan and continued to participate in anti-war sentiment and protest throughout the 60s and early 70s. He led a fast by university professors against University involvement in military research. His wife, Zelda F. Gamson, was also an active participant in the peace movement and was involved in the 1971 March on Washington.

Gamson is also known for his writing about and creation of simulation games used primarily in teaching and organizational training environments. These include SIMSOC: Simulated Society (1969), What’s News: A Game Simulation of TV News (1984), and the Global Justice Game (2007).

Gamson was also instrumental in the creation of fantasy baseball and fantasy sports. He created the first fantasy baseball league in Boston in 1960, the "Baseball Seminar," where colleagues would form rosters that earned points on the players' final standings in batting average, RBI, ERA and wins. Gamson later brought the idea with him to the University of Michigan where some professors played the game. These included historian Robert Sklar, whose students included Daniel Okrent; Okrent later wrote a book that was the key catalyst for the modern fantasy sports industry.

Gamson and his wife Zelda, who lived in Brookline, Massachusetts, had two children, Jennifer and Joshua, and five grandchildren.

== Gamson's Law ==
Gamson's Law of Proportionality or simply Gamson's Law was suggested by Eric C. Browne and Mark N. Franklin in 1971. They stated that there is proportionality between the numerical representation of each political force in a government and their number of seats in the parliament. It was based on the idea that each actor in government expects a payoff proportional to the weight that it contributes to the coalition, that had been proposed in the paper A theory of coalition formation, published in 1961 by William Gamson.

== Selected bibliography ==
- Gamson, William A.; Modigliani, Andre. 1989. "Media Discourse and Public Opinion on Nuclear Power: A Constructionist Approach". American Journal of Sociology 95: 1–37.
- Gamson, William, A.; Wolfsfeld, Gadi. 1993. "Movements and Media as Interacting Systems." The Annals of the American Academy of Political and Social Science 528: 114–125.
- Gamson, William A.; Meyer, David. 1996. "Framing political opportunity." In D. McAdam, J. McCarthy, & M. Zald (Eds.), Comparative Perspectives on Social Movements: Political Opportunities, Mobilizing Structures, and Cultural Framings (Cambridge Studies in Comparative Politics, pp. 275–290). Cambridge: Cambridge University Press. doi:10.1017/CBO9780511803987.014
- Gamson, William A. 1997. "On Coming to Terms with the Past." American Journal of Sociology 103: 210–215.
- Ferree, Myra Marx; Gamson, William A.; Gerhards, Jurgen; and Rucht, Dieter. 2002. Shaping Abortion Discourse: Democracy and the Public Sphere in Germany and the United States. New York, NY: Cambridge University Press.
- Gamson, William A. 2011. “From Outsiders to Insiders: The Changing Perception of Emotional Culture and Consciousness among Social Movement Scholars.” Mobilization 16: 405–418.
- Gamson, William A. 2013. “Games Throughout the Life-Cycle,” Simulation and Gaming, Vol. 44: 609–623.
