= Holy Cross Academy (Oneida, New York) =

Location
- 4020 Barrington Road; Vernon, (Oneida County), New York (Oneida, NY 13421 mailing address); United States; 43.0932°N 75.6314°W

Information
- Type: Private
- Religious affiliation: Roman Catholic
- Established: 1997
- Faculty: 8.5 (on FTE basis)
- Grades: 7 to 12
- Enrollment: 95 (2007–08)
- Student to teacher ratio: 11.2:1
- Athletics conference: North Country Athletic Conference
- Website: www.holycrossacademy.com

Holy Cross Academy is an independent Junior/Senior private high school located in Vernon, Oneida County, New York, with an Oneida mailing address. The school is an educational institution teaching in the Roman Catholic Tradition; its curriculum focuses on the impact of church culture and how it shaped the western world, and includes both classic and traditional liberal arts courses.

Though the school is independent of the administrative jurisdiction of the Diocese of Syracuse, it was established with and operates under the blessing of the diocesan bishop, and is registered with the New York State Department of Education.

The school has won numerous awards for excellence for its Catholic curriculum, athletics and musical departments (,).

== History ==
=== Founding ===
The idea for the high school was born in 1995. It was then that a group of local Roman Catholic parents met to discuss the need for a Catholic high school in the county. Many of the families involved were affiliated with local homeschooling organizations or had children registered at the local diocesan elementary school. They wanted a Catholic school established as an option for secondary schooling in the area. Though the Diocese of Syracuse encompasses seven counties, it was home to only five diocesan Junior/Senior high schools, none in Madison county and all beyond standard busing routes. Plans for the founding of a new school began soon after the meeting, and Holy Cross Academy was incorporated in 1996 and open to students in 1997.

=== Locations ===
Holy Cross Academy has operated in three locations. The first was in a two-classroom schoolhouse on the property of Holy Cross Church in New London, New York (for which the school was named). After seeing substantial growth in enrollment, the academy moved to the parish center of St. Joseph Church in Oneida).

In 2002, the academy made a permanent move to its first self-owned location after purchasing a former church facility on Barrington Road in Oneida. Since the purchase, the school has made several expansions, including the addition of extra classrooms and full-sized soccer and softball fields. Plans for substantial future renovations and additions have also been drawn. Holy Cross Academy became a member of NAPCIS (National Association for Catholic and Independent Schools) in 2003.

=== Affiliations ===
==== Department of Education ====
As a registered private school under jurisdiction of the New York State Department of Education, Holy Cross adheres to its regulations pertaining to private and/or religiously affiliated schools, including those relating to Regents Diploma graduation requirements. Some of the regulations to which the school is bound include:

1. Participating in a visit to the institution by a member of the Bureau of School Registration staff. This visitation is required to enroll with the state Board of Regents.

2. According to N.Y. Education Law §3204.2, only qualified teachers may administer educational classes.

3. All education and instruction at a private institution must be equivalent to its public counterparts.

4. All students must take part in Regents competency testing programs prior to commencement/graduation.

The school also follows course specification regulations as laid out by the State Department of Education.

==== Diocese of Syracuse ====
Although not specifically under diocesan jurisdiction, Holy Cross Academy operates under the blessing of the bishop and is faithful to the Magisterium of the Catholic Church. The Diocese of Syracuse is currently under the leadership of Bishop Robert J. Cunningham, and encompasses 285,000 Catholics living in Chenango, Madison, Oswego, Onondaga, Broome, Cortland and Oneida Counties.

== Administration ==
Holy Cross Academy is run by a Board of Trustees, who operate in conjunction with the school's principal (Therese Maciag, co-founder) and administrative advisor (Margaret Miller, co-founder). The school also receives spiritual direction from the Rev. Joseph Kehoe, as well as from numerous other area clergy.

Teachers employed by the academy are qualified individuals directed to imbue the curriculum with the teachings and culture of the Roman Catholic faith. On average, teachers at the academy have approximately 20 years of experience. Fifty percent of the classroom teachers hold advanced degrees. Several faculty members have come to the school after serving thirty to forty years in public or parochial school systems.

=== Prominent staff ===
Prominent staff members have included:

Deacon James Chappell, former mayor of Oneida.

Scott Rutledge, a professional musician who has “performed at several college and professional sporting events including Major League Baseball [and NBA games],” among numerous other accreditations.

== Athletics and extracurriculars ==
=== Athletics ===
Holy Cross offers three team sports: basketball, soccer and coed softball. Soccer is the school's primary sport. Both the boys’ and girls’ soccer teams have placed first numerous times in the North Country Athletic Conference league standings and tournaments. The school's Soccer Wall of Fame displays the name of each year's top graduating senior from the boys’ and girls’ teams, respectively.

==== NCAC Sports ====
The school is also a member of the North Country Athletic Conference, a sports league for several upstate New York private school athletic teams formed in 2002. The league has expanded to include seven teams, including River Valley, New Life Christian Academy, New York State School for the Deaf, Holy Cross Academy, Faith Fellowship, Lowville Homeschool and Messiah Academy. NCAC is responsible for sponsoring league All-Stars and scholar athletes, forming team schedules, hosting league tournaments, and monitoring team standings.

=== Extracurricular organizations ===
Holy Cross Academy has established numerous additional extracurricular organizations throughout the years, including Drama Club, Student Government, various Choirs including Select Choir (which has performed live with professional musical groups such as “The Elders”), Robotics, Mathletics/Math Counts, Colgate Seminar, Student Council, Bake Club, Ski Club, Chess Club, Band, Yearbook Committee, and B.I.B.L.E. The school hosts many extracurricular events throughout the year, including theatre productions, concerts and open houses.

== Academics ==
The Holy Cross curriculum seeks to implement an entrepreneurial approach to academics, utilizing the best methods drawing from traditional, classic and contemporary methods. Students must meet New York State Board of Regents requirements, and students must take part in Regents Competency Testing programs prior to graduating with a Regents Diploma. Holy Cross Academy offers both Regents and Advanced Regents diplomas to graduating seniors, in addition to the Holy Cross Academy diploma.

=== Courses offered ===
Courses of study cover a range of liberal arts subjects. They include: English (literature and grammar); fine arts (music and art); early and advanced mathematics; physical education; theology; science; foreign language (Spanish and Latin); technology and computer graphics; government and economics; and some AP courses.

=== Graduation requirements ===
Graduation requirements are as follows:

CREDITS REQUIRED (Regents/Advanced Regents):English/History/Religion (4.0/4.0); Math/Science (3.0/3.0); Health (0.5/0.5); Art/Music (1.0/1.0); 2nd Language (1.0/3.0); Physical Ed. (2.0/2.0); Total (22/22).

== NAPCIS ==
Holy Cross Academy has been a member of NAPCIS since 2003 and is also a member of the Catholic High School Honor Roll. The National Association for Catholic and Independent Schools is “an accreditation, teacher certification, and support institution for independent Roman Catholic Schools”.

=== National Honor Roll ===
Each year, NAPCIS, in conjunction with the Acton Institute, publishes the National Catholic Honor Roll to recognize schools with lofty academic standards and strong Catholic identities, and commitment to civic education.

Holy Cross Academy has been named one of the Top 50 Catholic schools on the National Honor Roll four times, (in 2004, 2005, 2006, and 2007). It also received an honorable mention for Civic Education in 2010 and 2011.
