= Shark Valley =

Geological depression in Everglades National Park, United States

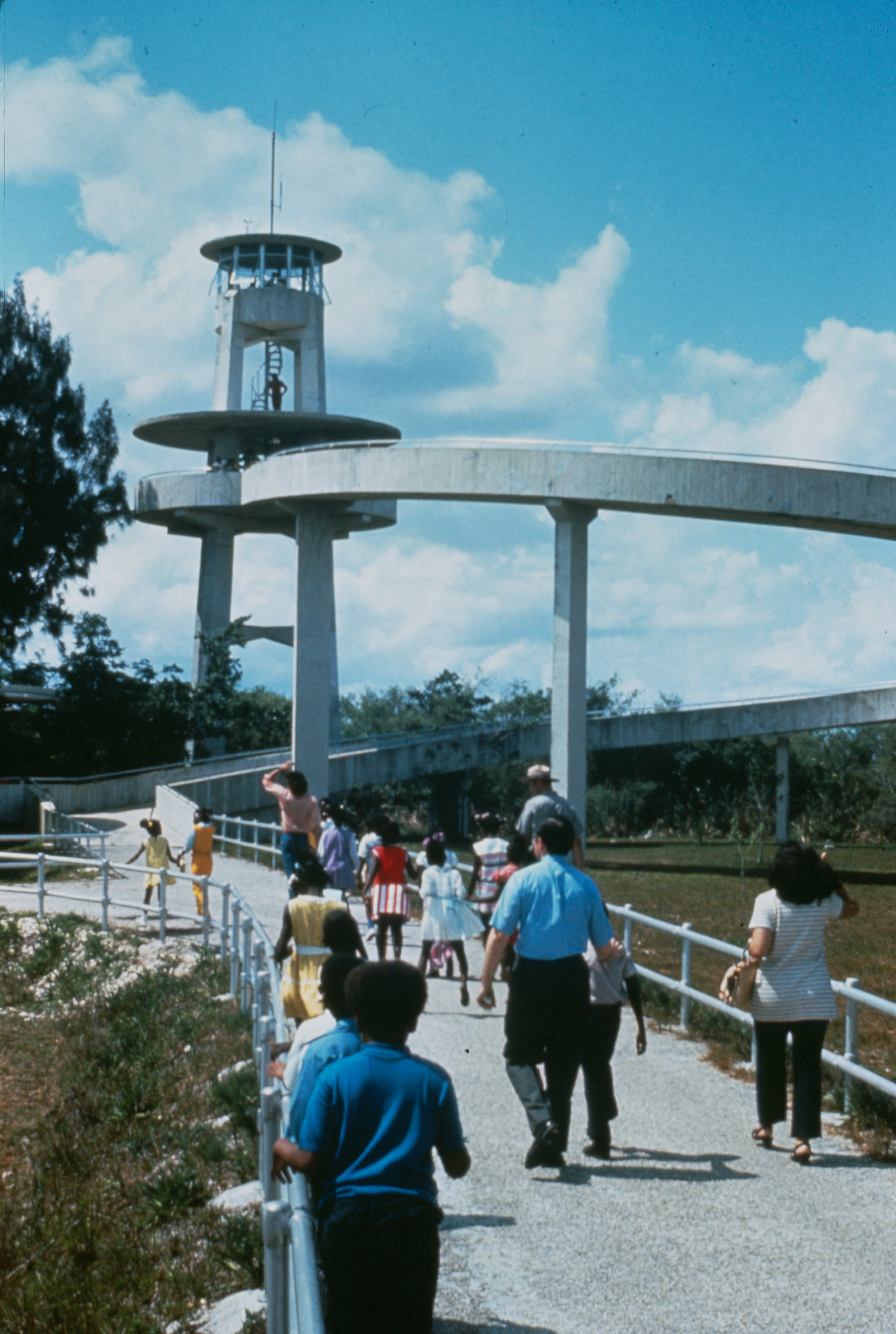
- Shark Valley trail and observation tower
- Interactive map of Shark Valley
- Location: Everglades National Park (ENP)
- Nearest city: Miami
- Coordinates: 25°42′28″N 80°45′47″W
- Created: 1947 (ENP)
- Operator: National Park Service
- Status: Open all year

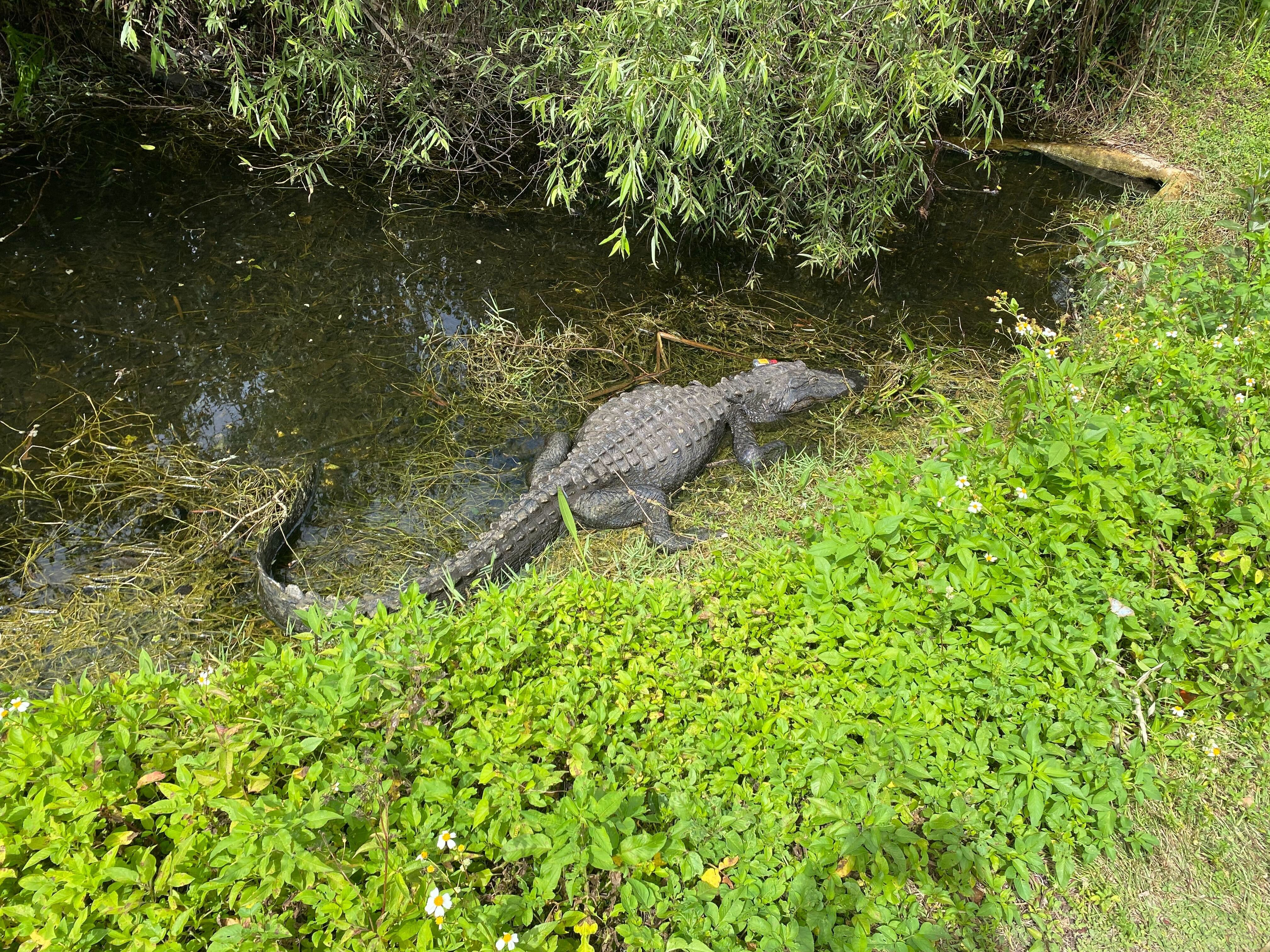
American alligator at Shark Valley in Everglades National Park

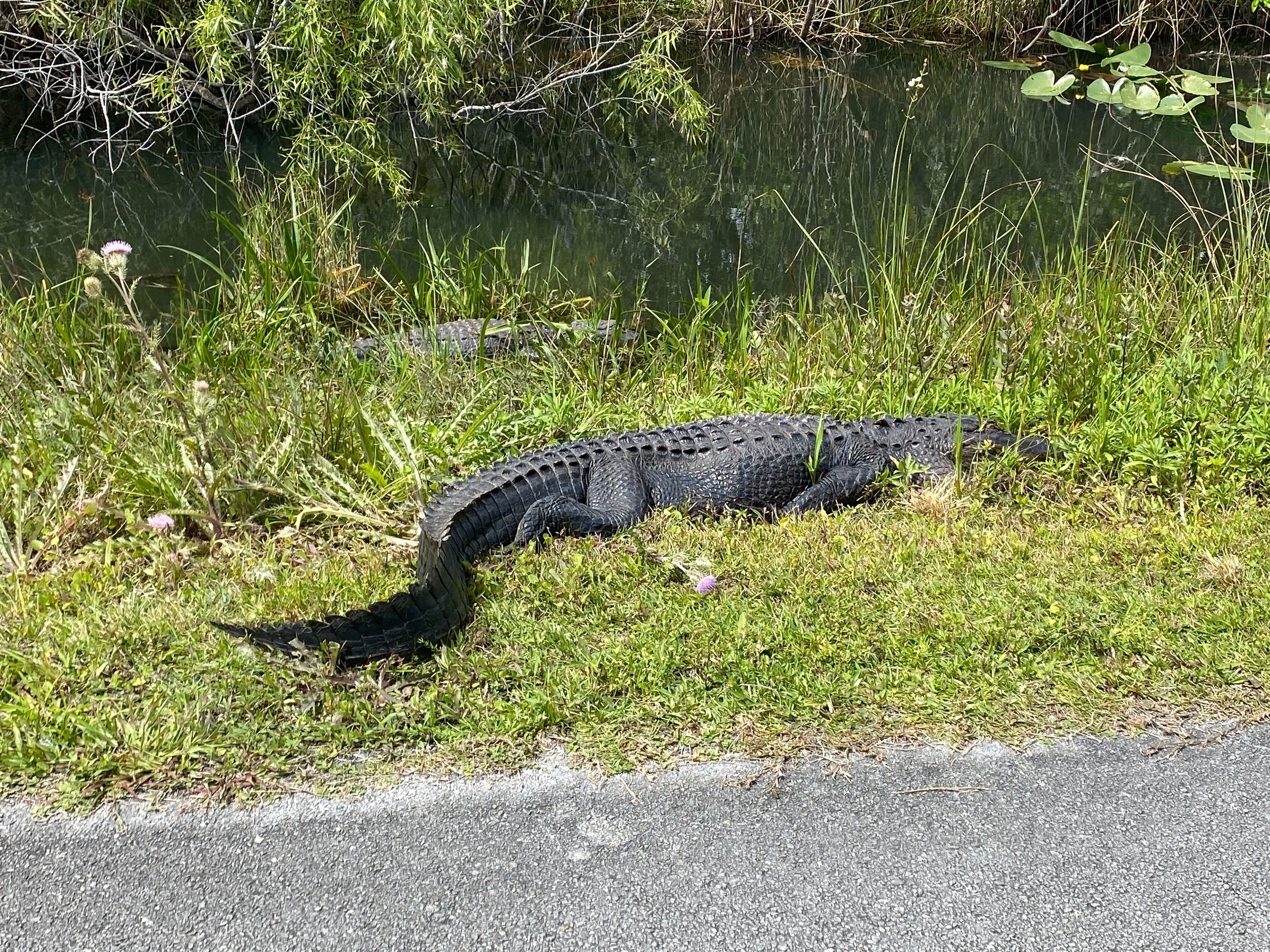
Two American alligators next to the bike path at Shark Valley

Shark Valley is a geological depression at the head of the Shark River Slough in far western Miami-Dade County, Florida, United States. It is currently part of Everglades National Park. Shark Valley empties into Shark River in the Ten Thousand Islands of Monroe County. Shark Valley characteristically includes sawgrass prairie that floods during the rainy season, hence the name "river of grass"—Pa-Hay-Okee, from the Mikasuki language—for such marshes in the Everglades. Shark Valley features a Visitor Center with educational displays, a park video, an underwater camera and informational brochures. The entrance to Shark Valley is located along Tamiami Trail (US 41) near the Miami-Dade–Collier County line.

== Characteristics ==
Shark Valley contains large expanses of oolitic limestone either exposed or overlain by marl. The area, having a brief hydroperiod, is seasonally submerged, with Cladium jamaicense (sawgrass) being the dominant vegetation. Unlike the deeper Shark River Slough, Shark Valley does not contain standing water year-round. Wildlife seen in Shark Valley includes alligators, ibis, wood storks, roseate spoonbills, raccoons, white-tailed deer, and various amphibians.

== History ==
A well-known episode in the Second Seminole War occurred in or near Shark Valley. In the late 1830s, groups of Spanish Indians successively raided a guarded trading post on the Caloosahatchee River in 1839 and committed a massacre on Indian Key in 1840. The Spanish Indians, who resided in Southwest Florida, were a mix of Creek refugees and people of mixed Native American and Spanish, possibly even Calusa, descent. On December 4, 1840, responding to attacks by the Spanish Indians, 90 men under the command of Lieutenant Colonel W. S. Harney targeted one of their key leaders, Chakaika (sometimes spelled Chekika). The men departed from Fort Dallas at the mouth of the Miami River, now Downtown Miami, and reached Chakaika's hideout in the Everglades. They found Chakaika with some of his rebels, shot him, and had him hanged on "Chakaika's island," a tree island in the Everglades. This tree island is believed to be present-day Chekika Island, located at the beginning of Shark Valley.

The observation tower at Shark Valley was designed by the prominent South Florida architect Edward M. Ghezzi. It was built in 1964 as part of the Mission 66 projects throughout the national parks. The tower design is similar to that of the tower on Kuwohi in Smoky Mountain National Park

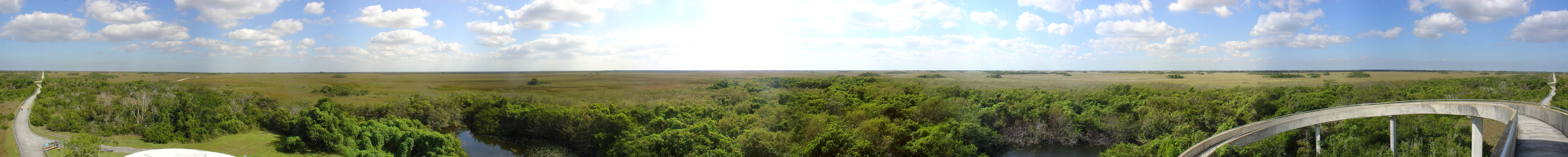
360° panorama from the observation tower at Shark Valley

.

== See also ==
- Everglades National Park
