= Zelda F. Gamson =

American sociologist (1936–2026)

Zelda Gamson
- Born: March 12, 1936; Philadelphia, Pennsylvania, U.S.
- Died: April 27, 2026 (aged 90); Lincoln, Massachusetts, U.S.
- Education: Harvard University; University of Michigan
- Spouse: William Gamson
- Children: Jennifer and Joshua
- Scientific career
- Fields: Higher education
- Workplaces: University of Massachusetts Boston; University of Michigan

Zelda Gamson (née Finkelstein; March 12, 1936 – April 27, 2026) was an American sociologist, writer and activist. Her scholarly work primarily focused on the sociology of higher education, in particular innovation and change.

== Background ==
Zelda Finkelstein was born in Philadelphia, Pennsylvania, on March 12, 1936. She was the daughter of Jewish immigrants from Ukraine. Finkelstein attended public schools in Philadelphia, and studied at the University of Pennsylvania and Antioch College before completing her undergraduate degree at University of Michigan in 1958. She received a master's degree in sociology from the University of Michigan in 1959 and a PhD from the Department of Social Relations at Harvard University in 1965.

She was married to the late William A. Gamson. They had two children, Jennifer (born 1960) and Joshua (born 1962). Zelda Gamson died from pancreatic cancer in Lincoln, Massachusetts on April 27, 2026, at the age of 90.

== Career and scholarship ==
Gamson's doctoral dissertation about Monteith College, an experimental college for non-elite students at Wayne State University, brought her into the orbit of David Riesman, with whom she later co-authored an in-depth study of mass higher education. Her early research focused on student organizations, student-faculty relations, higher education within Israeli kibbutzim, minority experiences on college campuses, and mass education. She later became involved in national efforts for higher education reform, with a particular focus on undergraduate educational practice. Her work has centered on the ways higher education is and can be organized for civic engagement and the common good, as well as on stratification and inequality in higher education. Her most notable work in this arena includes Liberating Education (1984), "Seven Principles for Good Practice in Higher Education" (1987, with Arthur Chickering), Applying the Seven Principles of Good Practice in Undergraduate Education (1991, with Arthur Chickering), and Revitalizing General Education in a Time of Scarcity (1997, with Sandra Kanter and Howard London). The "Seven Principles" continue to be widely circulated in settings such as college teaching and learning centers, as well as in the development of pedagogy and educational technology. Gamson was an invited member of the Study Group on the Conditions of Excellence in Undergraduate Education sponsored by the U.S. Department of Education's National Institute of Education. Foundations that have supported her research include the Carnegie Foundation, the National Science Foundation, the National Institute of Mental Health, the Ford Foundation, the Lilly Endowment, the Andrew W. Mellon Foundation, and the Pew Charitable Trusts. She has also written for non-academic publications such as Jewish Currents. Her latest publication is the memoir Don't Play Like a Girl: A Midcentury Woman Leaps Into Life.

Gamson spent more than seventeen years at the University of Michigan, with appointments at the Institute for Social Research, the Center for the Study of Higher Education, and the Residential College. In 1988, she moved to the University of Massachusetts in Boston, where she founded the Higher Education Doctoral Program and was the Founding Director of the New England Resource Center for Higher Education (NERCHE). She retired from the University of Massachusetts in 1999, has been honored as Professor Emerita by the University of Massachusetts Boston, and lived in Brookline, Massachusetts.
