= Joshua Gamson =

American sociologist (born 1962)

Joshua Gamson (born November 16, 1962) is an American scholar and author. A graduate of Swarthmore College and the University of California, Berkeley, he served on the faculty of Yale University before becoming a professor of sociology at the University of San Francisco. His work has appeared in The Nation, The American Prospect, Newsday, Gender & Society, the Journal of the History of Sexuality, and Sociological Inquiry. He is the son of sociologists William and Zelda F. Gamson.

Gamson received the 2006 Stonewall Book Award for nonfiction for The Fabulous Sylvester, his biography of disco singer and activist Sylvester, which was also shortlisted for the 2005 Lambda Literary Awards. In a mostly positive review for The Village Voice, Robert Christgau lamented the gaps in Gamson's knowledge of music history, but praised his "details and insights" into Sylvester's life. Kirkus Reviews called the book "worshipful, occasionally overenthusiastic, yet engaging and sometimes surprisingly insightful."

He was a 2009 Guggenheim Fellow and received a Placek Award from the American Psychological Association in 1995.

== Bibliography ==
- Claims to Fame: Celebrity in Contemporary America (1994)
- Freaks Talk Back: Tabloid Talk Shows and Sexual Nonconformity (1998)
- The Fabulous Sylvester: The Legend, The Music, The Seventies in San Francisco (2005)
- Modern Families: Stories of Extraordinary Journeys to Kinship (2015)
