= Stephen Gamson =

American artist and art collector (born 1965)

Gamson at his Miami Studio

Stephen Gamson (born 1965) is an American artist and art collector.

== Early life ==
Gamson spent much of his youth visiting studios, museums, and researching art through books. As a student, he began collecting the work of artists he admired. After post-graduate studies in art history at Harvard University, in the early 1990s, Gamson had a one-man show at the Candide Gallery in Atlanta, Georgia.

== Exhibitions and displays ==
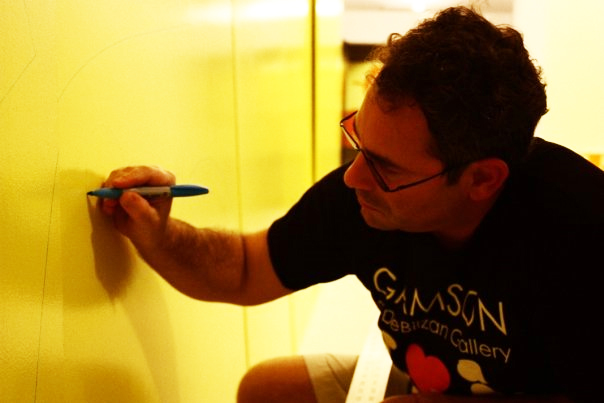
Stephen Gamson laying out a new mural painting

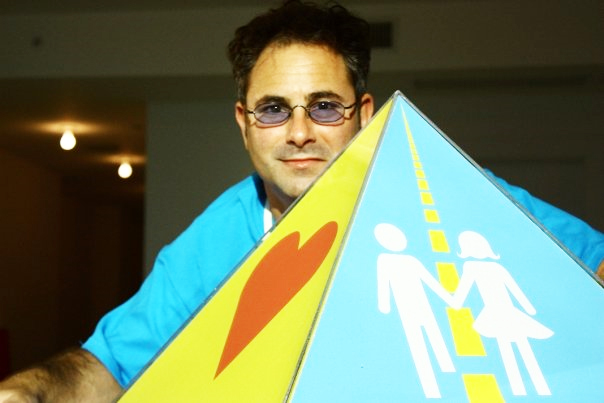
Gamson with his Pyramid sculpture.

In 2004, Gamson was the featured artist for the Nautica Project. This permanent show includes his creation of two aluminum sculptures, a 30’wide x 5’high mural and numerous paintings depicting life on Miami Beach. On January 26, 2008, a show including 29 of his acrylic on canvas paintings was displayed at Gallery Jax in Miami. He is represented by Rebecca Hossack Gallery in London and Seth Jason Beitler Fine Arts in Miami. He displayed his work at an exhibition that opened on August 7, 2008, at DeBillzan Gallery in Laguna Beach, California, and had a solo show in the Projects room at Frank Pictures Gallery in Santa Monica, California, which opened on October 9, 2008.

In early December 2008, Gamson held a solo show, titled "Symbols and Portraits", at the Seth Jason Beitler Fine Arts in Wynwood as part of Art Basel 2008. Gamson was the official artist for Café Bustelo. His artwork will appear internationally as Bustelo rolls out 100 retail stores. For 2009, Gamson has been commissioned to create large scale, high-profile projects in Los Angeles and Las Vegas. He was also selected as the official poster artist for the 35th Annual Miami Beach Festival of the Arts in February 2009.

Stephen has been featured in many publications such as The Hollywood Reporter, the Miami Herald, Haute Living Magazine, Six Degrees Magazine (page 25/26), and has been in articles on MSNBC, Reuters, and Yahoo! News.

== Organizations ==
Gamson has served on the board of directors for many organizations such as The Jackson Metropolitans (a division of the Jackson Memorial Hospital Foundation), The Shakers advisory board for the Museum of Contemporary Art, North Miami, Hugs and Kisses at the Miami Children's Hospital, The AJ Japour Art Gallery and Foundation, and is one of the founding members of Art for a Cause.
