= Lycée Alexandre Dumas =

Location
- Rue Marcadieu Bourdon B.P. 2213 Port-au-Prince, Haiti; Port-au-Prince; Haiti
- Coordinates: 18.539004°N 72.3092436°W

Information
- Type: K-12 school
- Grades: K-12
- Website: www.lyceefrancaishaiti.org

The Lycée Alexandre Dumas (LAD, Haitian Creole: Lise Alexandre-Dumas) is a French international school in Port-au-Prince, Haiti. It has primaire (primary school) and collège-lycée (junior and senior high school) levels.

Lycée Alexandre Dumas, a university preparatory school, is considered to be an "elite" institution within Haiti.
