= Kendall West, Florida =

- Census-designated place
- Location in Miami-Dade County and the state of Florida

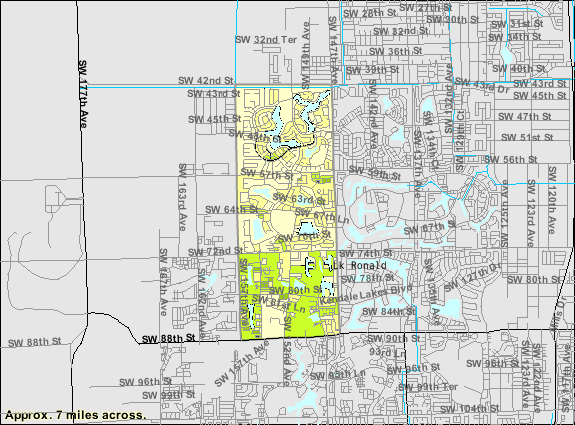
- U.S. Census Bureau map showing boundaries
- Coordinates: 25°42′23″N 80°26′20″W
- Country: United States
- State: Florida
- County: Miami-Dade

Area
  - Total: 3.01 sq mi (7.80 km^{2})
  - Land: 2.75 sq mi (7.13 km^{2})
  - Water: 0.26 sq mi (0.67 km^{2})
- Elevation: 7 ft (2.1 m)

Population (2020)
  - Total: 36,536
  - Density: 13,277.1/sq mi (5,126.32/km^{2})
- Time zone: UTC-5 (Eastern (EST))
  - Summer (DST): UTC-4 (EDT)
- ZIP Codes: 33185, 33193 (Miami)
- Area codes: 305, 786, 645
- FIPS code: 12-36121
- GNIS feature ID: 2403170

Kendall West is a census-designated place and unincorporated community in Miami-Dade County, Florida, west of the Florida Turnpike. It is located in the Miami metropolitan area of South Florida. The population was 36,536 at the 2020 census.

== Geography ==
Kendall West is located 17 miles (27 km) west-southwest of downtown Miami. It is bordered to the east by Kendale Lakes, to the south by The Hammocks, and to the west and north by farmland or undeveloped land.

According to the United States Census Bureau, the census area has a total area of 3.01 square miles (7.8 km^{2}), of which 2.75 square miles (7.1 km^{2}) are land and 0.26 square miles (0.67 km^{2}), or 8.57%, are water.

== Demographics ==
Historical population
Census	Pop.	Note	%±
1990	6,038		—
2000	38,034		529.9%
2010	36,154		−4.9%
2020	36,536		1.1%

=== Racial and ethnic composition ===
Kendall West CDP, Florida – Racial and ethnic composition Note: the US Census treats Hispanic/Latino as an ethnic category. This table excludes Latinos from the racial categories and assigns them to a separate category. Hispanics/Latinos may be of any race.
Race / Ethnicity (NH = Non-Hispanic)	Pop 2010	Pop 2020	% 2010	% 2020
White (NH)	2,982	2,224	8.25%	6.09%
Black or African American (NH)	626	463	1.73%	1.27%
Native American or Alaska Native (NH)	12	11	0.03%	0.03%
Asian (NH)	389	420	1.08%	1.15%
Pacific Islander or Native Hawaiian (NH)	2	3	0.01%	0.01%
Some other race (NH)	48	124	0.13%	0.34%
Mixed race or Multiracial (NH)	183	331	0.51%	0.91%
Hispanic or Latino (any race)	31,912	32,960	88.27%	90.21%
Total	36,154	36,536	100.00%	100.00%

=== 2020 census ===
As of the 2020 census, Kendall West had a population of 36,536. The median age was 43.7 years. 18.2% of residents were under the age of 18 and 17.4% of residents were 65 years of age or older. For every 100 females there were 85.6 males, and for every 100 females age 18 and over there were 81.9 males age 18 and over.

100.0% of residents lived in urban areas, while 0.0% lived in rural areas.

There were 12,350 households in Kendall West, of which 34.3% had children under the age of 18 living in them. Of all households, 47.4% were married-couple households, 12.4% were households with a male householder and no spouse or partner present, and 30.8% were households with a female householder and no spouse or partner present. About 14.6% of all households were made up of individuals and 6.8% had someone living alone who was 65 years of age or older. There were 9,438 families residing in the CDP.

There were 12,819 housing units, of which 3.7% were vacant. The homeowner vacancy rate was 0.6% and the rental vacancy rate was 4.9%.

Racial composition as of the 2020 census
Race	Number	Percent
White	9,374	25.7%
Black or African American	648	1.8%
American Indian and Alaska Native	100	0.3%
Asian	457	1.3%
Native Hawaiian and Other Pacific Islander	6	0.0%
Some other race	4,957	13.6%
Two or more races	20,994	57.5%
Hispanic or Latino (of any race)	32,960	90.2%

=== 2010 census ===
As of the 2010 United States census, there were 36,154 people, 11,036 households, and 8,840 families residing in the CDP.

=== 2000 census ===
As of the census of 2000, there were 38,034 people, 11,759 households, and 9,807 families residing in the CDP. The population density was 11,218.6 inhabitants per square mile (4,331.5/km^{2}). There were 12,229 housing units at an average density of 3,607.1 per square mile (1,392.7/km^{2}). The racial makeup of the CDP was 83.37% White (15.3% were Non-Hispanic White), 4.23% African American, 0.19% Native American, 1.48% Asian, 0.03% Pacific Islander, 6.44% from other races, and 4.25% from two or more races. Hispanic or Latino of any race were 79.03% of the population.

As of 2000, there were 11,759 households, out of which 49.5% had children under the age of 18 living with them, 58.8% were married couples living together, 18.5% had a female householder with no husband present, and 16.6% were non-families. 11.8% of all households were made up of individuals, and 2.5% had someone living alone who was 65 years of age or older. The average household size was 3.23 and the average family size was 3.47.

In 2000, in the CDP, the population was spread out, with 29.2% under the age of 18, 10.2% from 18 to 24, 34.9% from 25 to 44, 18.5% from 45 to 64, and 7.1% who were 65 years of age or older. The median age was 32 years. For every 100 females, there were 89.7 males. For every 100 females age 18 and over, there were 84.7 males.

In 2000, the median income for a household in the community was $38,715, and the median income for a family was $39,564. Males had a median income of $30,082 versus $23,695 for females. The per capita income for the CDP was $14,806. About 13.3% of families and 15.4% of the population were below the poverty line, including 18.4% of those under age 18 and 13.4% of those age 65 or over.

As of 2000, speakers of Spanish as a first language accounted for 84.44% of residents, while English made up 13.48%, and both French Creole and Portuguese were the mother tongue for 0.47% of the population.

== Education ==
Miami-Dade County Public Schools operates public schools.

- Bowman Ashe/Doolin K-8 Academy
- Jane S. Roberts K-8 Center
- Dante B. Fascell Elementary School

Charter schools:

- Pinecrest Academy (South Campus)

== See also ==
- West Kendall, Florida, a neighborhood within the census boundaries of Kendall
