= G. Holmes Braddock Senior High School =

Location
- 3601 SW 147 Avenue; Miami, Florida 33185; United States; 25°44′07″N 80°25′49″W

Information
- Type: Public secondary
- Established: September 1989
- School district: Miami-Dade County Public Schools
- Principal: Allen N. Breeding III
- Teaching staff: 109.00 (FTE)
- Grades: 9–12
- Enrollment: 2,296 (2023-2024)
- Student to teacher ratio: 21.06
- Colors: Royal blue and grey
- Mascot: Challenger (1988-2001); Bulldog (2001-present)
- Website: braddockbulldogs.org

G. Holmes Braddock Senior High School is a secondary school located in unincorporated Miami-Dade County, Florida, United States. The school is named after G. Holmes Braddock, a former 38-year member of the school board who, as chairperson from 1969 to 1970, led the district's efforts to desegregate its schools. This high school is a magnet school of choice. The magnet programs offered by this school are iPreparatory Academy, visual and performing arts, Cambridge University program, and information technology.

== Demographics ==
Braddock is 91% Hispanic, 6% White non-Hispanic, 2% Black, and 1% Asian. 52% of the students are male. 48% of the students are female.

== Curriculum ==
In 2006, Braddock began offering the Cambridge University curriculum used in the United Kingdom.

== Notable alumni ==
- Sean Rodriguez, Major League Baseball player
- Yohandy Morales, Major League Baseball player

== See also ==
- Miami-Dade County Public Schools
