= Miami-Dade County, Florida =

County in Florida, United States

Miami-Dade County
- County
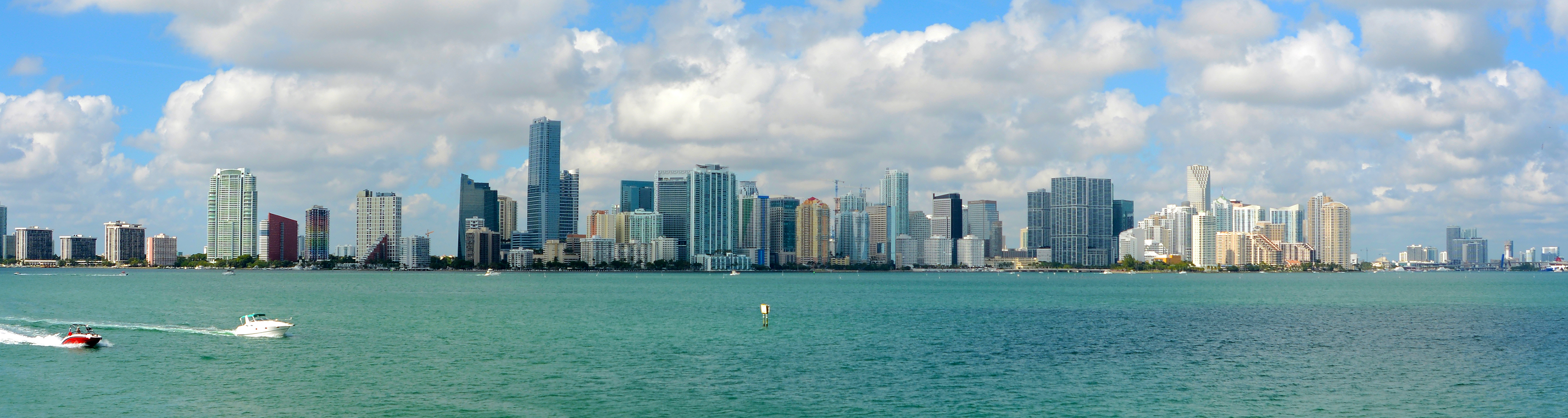
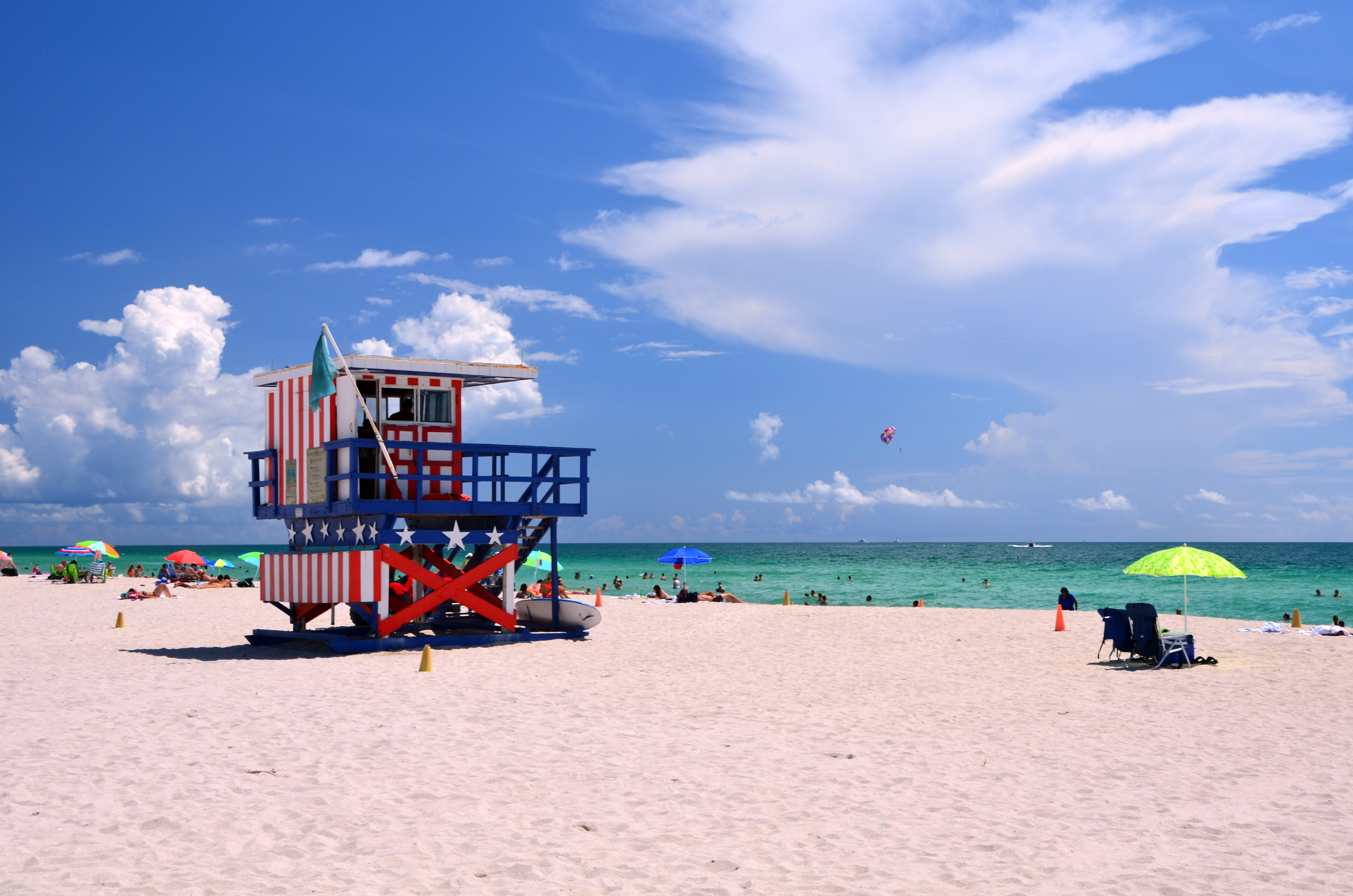
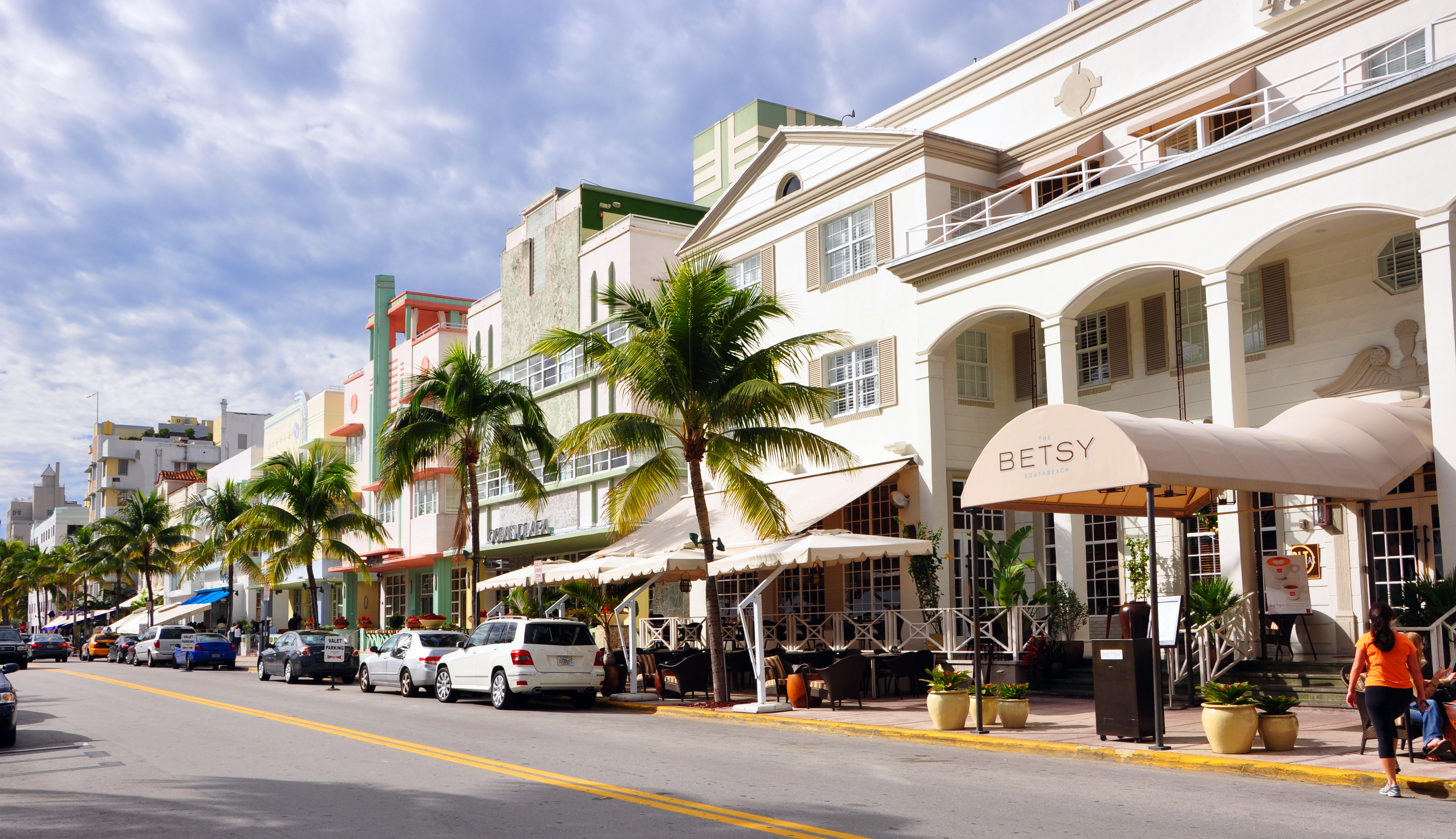
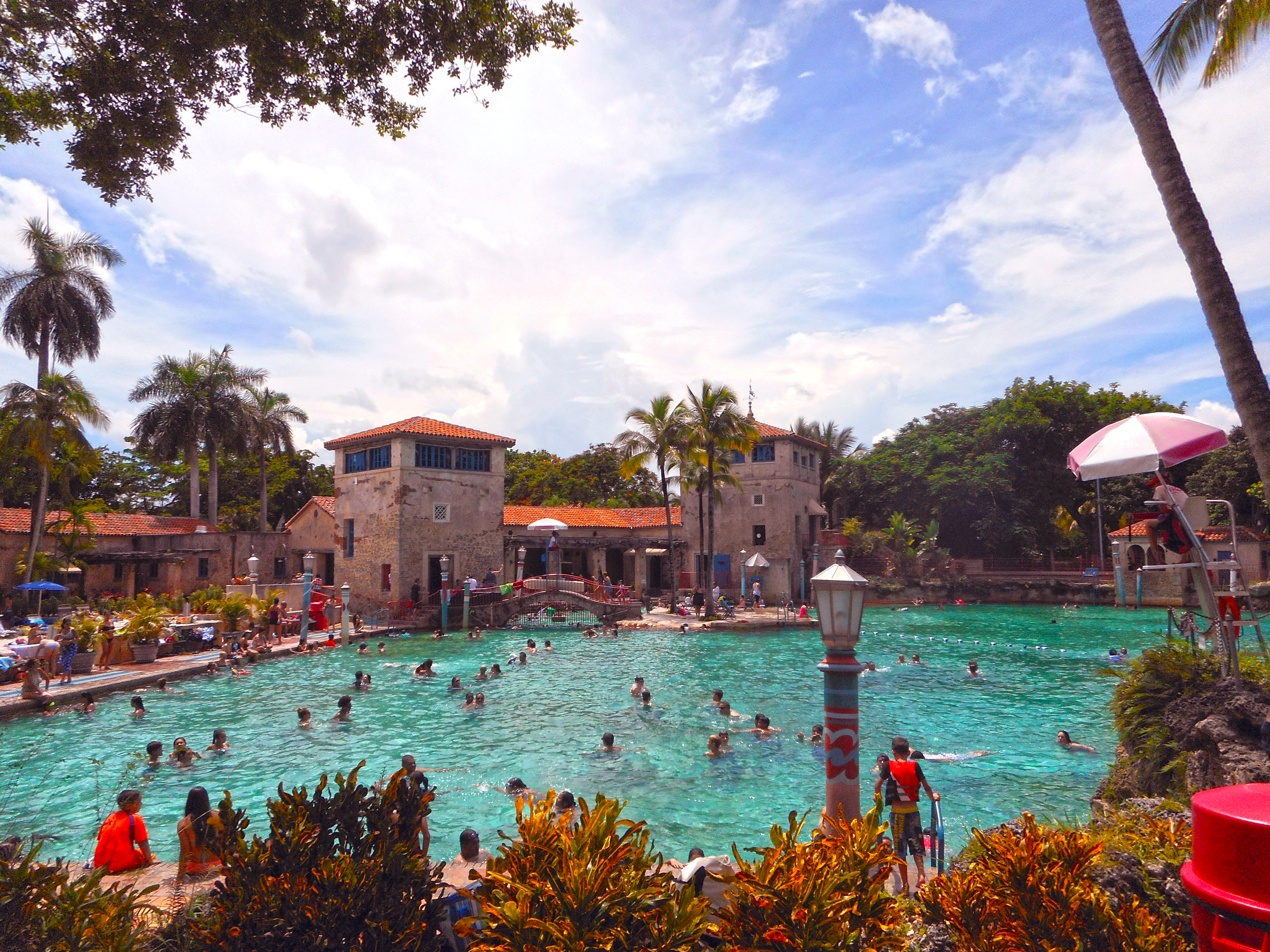
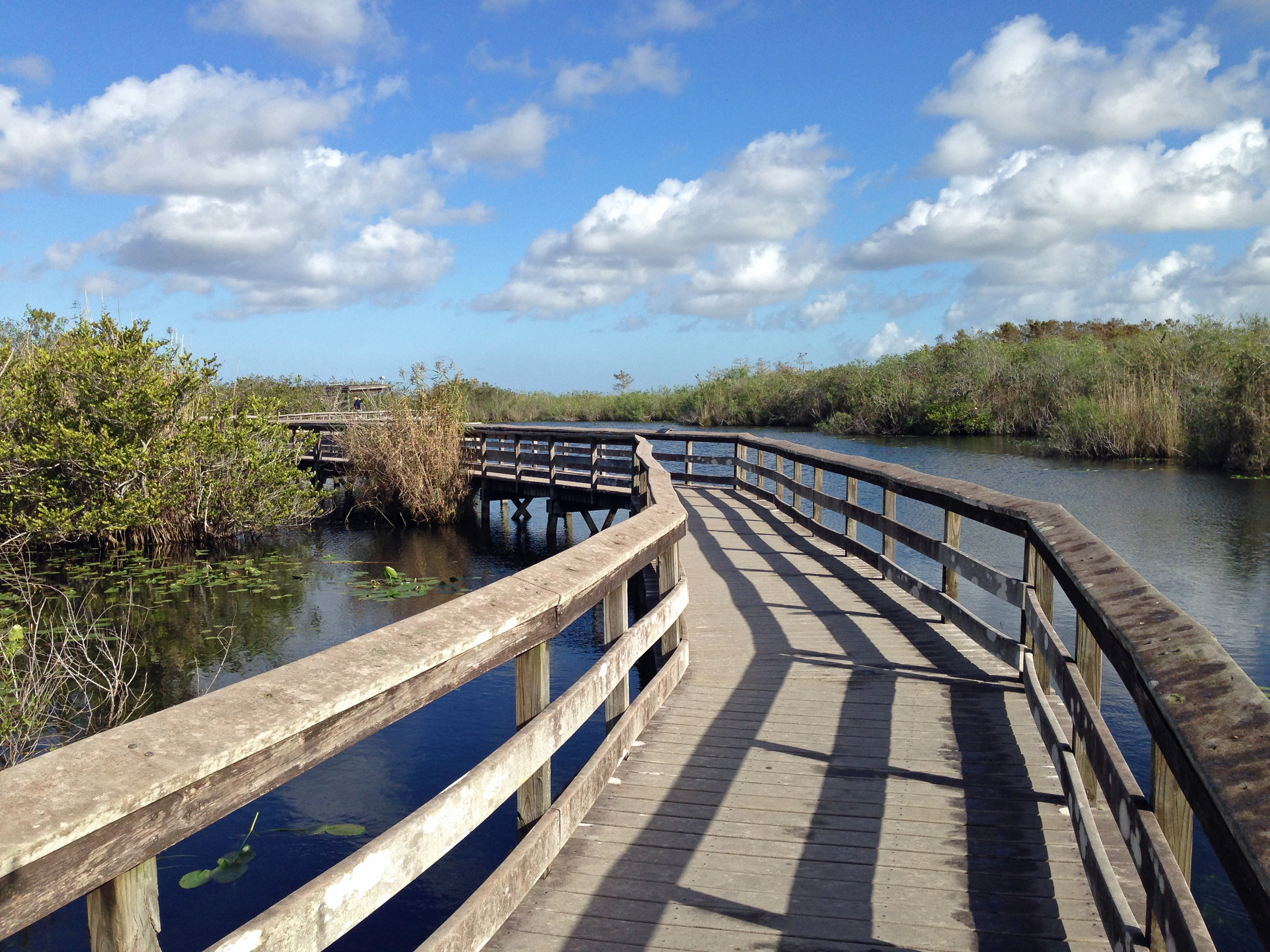
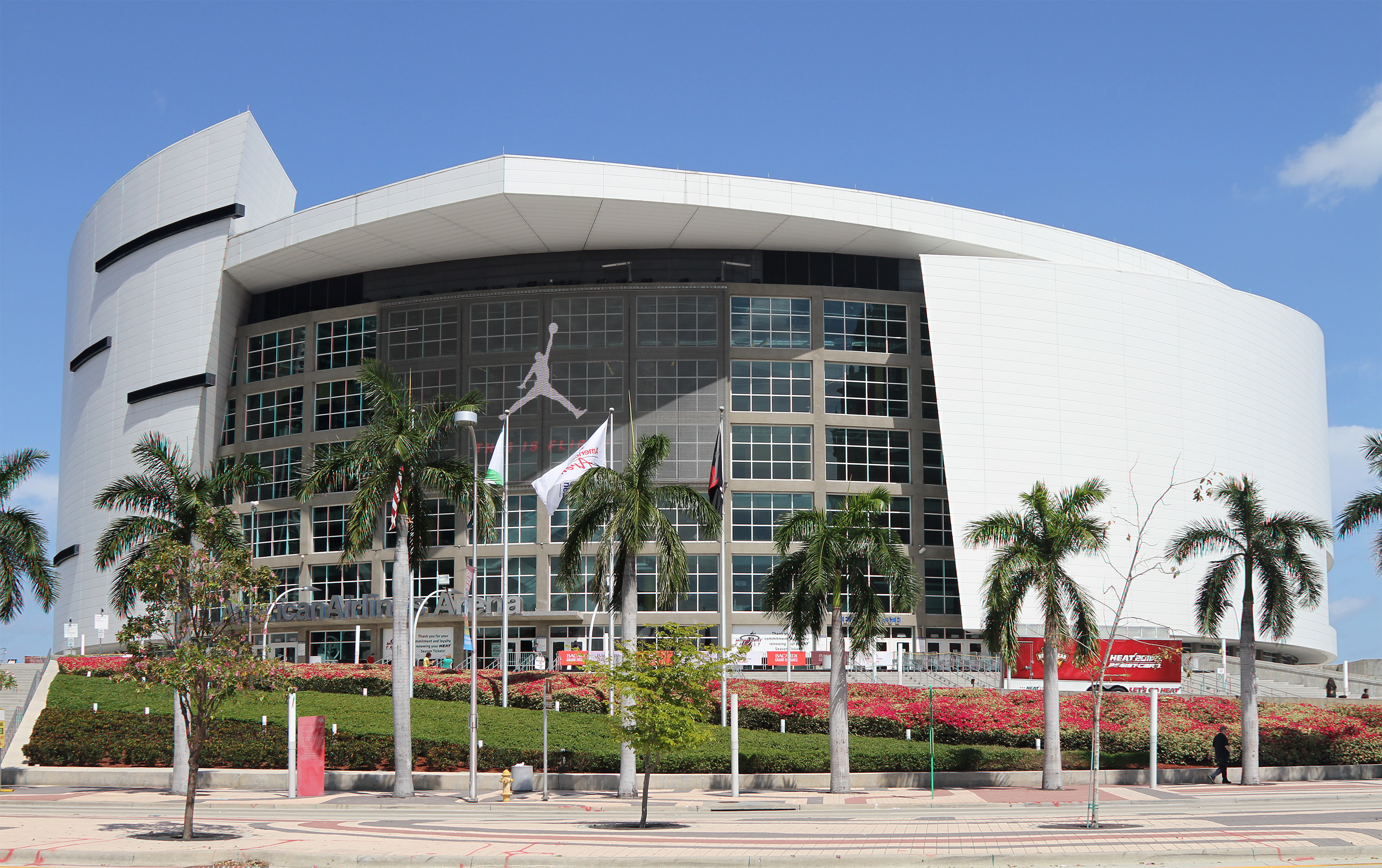
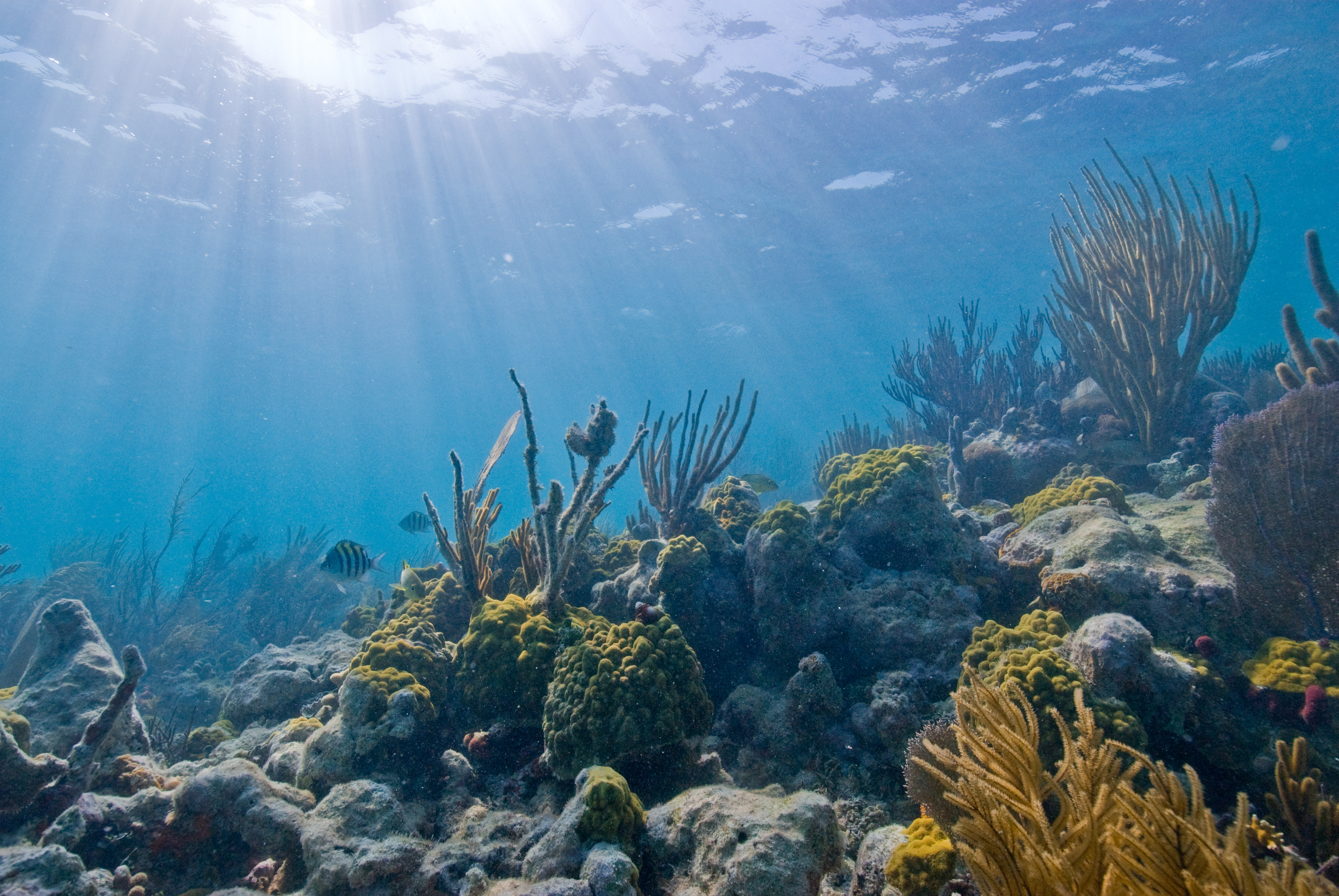
- Left to right from top down: Downtown Miami Skyline; a lifeguard station on South Beach; South of 15th Street on Ocean Drive (South Beach); Venetian Pool in Coral Gables; Anhinga Trail boardwalk in Everglades National Park; Kaseya Center on Biscayne Boulevard; and an aquatic reef in Biscayne National Park

- Flag Seal Logo
- Nicknames: "Dade County", "Dade", "Metro Dade County", "Metropolitan Dade County", "Greater Miami"
- Motto: Delivering Excellence Every Day
- Interactive map of Miami-Dade County
- Location within Florida Location within the United States
- Coordinates: 25°36′38″N 80°29′50″W
- Country: United States
- State: Florida
- Region: South Florida
- Metro area: Miami
- Founded: February 4, 1836
- Named for: Francis L. Dade and Miami, derived from the Miami River, and ultimately derived from Mayaimi
- County seat and largest city: Miami
- Incorporated municipalities: 34

Government
  - Type: Two-tier federation
  - Body: Miami-Dade Board of County Commissioners
  - County Commission: Commissioners: Oliver G. Gilbert III; Marleine Bastien; Keon Hardemon; Micky Steinberg; Vicky L. Lopez; Natalie Milian Orbis; Raquel A. Regalado; Danielle Cohen Higgins; Kionne McGhee (Vice-Chair); Anthony Rodriguez (Chair); Roberto J. Gonzalez; Juan Carlos J.C. Bermudez; René García
  - Mayor: Daniella Levine Cava (D) (Note: The Mayor of Miami-Dade County is officially elected in a non-partisan election, despite common de facto party affiliation.)

Area
  - Total: 2,431.178 sq mi (6,296.72 km^{2})
  - Land: 1,898.753 sq mi (4,917.75 km^{2})
  - Water: 532.425 sq mi (1,378.97 km^{2}) 21.9%
- Highest elevation (Miami Rock Ridge): 20–26 ft (6–8 m)
- Lowest elevation (Atlantic Ocean): 0 ft (0 m)

Population (2020)
  - Total: 2,701,767
  - Estimate (2025): 2,802,029 ▲
  - Rank: 7th in the United States; 1st in Florida
  - Density: 1,422.917/sq mi (549.3911/km^{2})
- Demonym: Miamian

GDP
  - Total: $239.652 billion (2023)
- Time zone: UTC−5 (Eastern Time Zone)
  - Summer (DST): UTC−4 (Eastern Daylight Time)
- ZIP Codes: 33002, 33010–33018, 33030–33035, 33039, 33054, 33056, 33090, 33092, 33101–33102, 33106, 33109, 33111–33112, 33114, 33116, 33119, 33122, 33124–33147, 33149–33158, 33160–33170, 33172–33199, 33206, 33222, 33231, 33233–33234, 33238–33239, 33242–33243, 33245, 33247, 33255–33257, 33261, 33265–33266, 33269, 33280, 33283, 33296, 33299
- Area codes: 305, 786, 645
- FIPS code: 12086
- GNIS feature ID: 295755
- Website: www.miamidade.gov

Miami-Dade County (/maɪˈæmi ˈdeɪd/), originally Dade County until 1997, is located in the southeastern part of the U.S. state of Florida. The county had a population of 2,701,767 as of the 2020 census, making it the most populous county in Florida and the seventh-most-populous county in the United States. It is Florida's third largest county by land area with 1,946 square miles (5,040 km^{2}). The county seat is Miami, the core of the nation's sixth-largest and world's 65th-largest metropolitan area with a 2020 population of 6.138 million people (Note: The metropolitan area includes Broward and Palm Beach counties.), exceeding the population of 31 of the nation's 50 states as of 2022.

As of 2022, Miami-Dade County has a gross domestic product of $184.5 billion, making the county's GDP the largest for any county in the State of Florida and the 14th-largest for the nation's 3,033 counties. The county is home to the Port of Miami on Biscayne Bay, the world's largest passenger port with a record 5.5 million passengers in 2018, and Miami International Airport, the third largest U.S. airport for international passengers and largest U.S. airport for international cargo. The county's land area of nearly 2,000 square miles (5,200 km^{2}) exceeds that of two U.S. states, Delaware and Rhode Island. The county is home to several universities and colleges, including Florida International University, one of the largest public universities in the country, and the University of Miami in Coral Gables, a private research university that is routinely ranked as one of the nation's top universities and is the county's second-largest employer with nearly 17,000 employees as of 2021.

Miami-Dade County is heavily Hispanic and is the most populous majority-Hispanic county in the nation as of 2020. It is home to 34 incorporated cities and many unincorporated areas. The northern, central and eastern portions of the county are heavily urbanized with many high-rise buildings along the coastline, including Miami's Central Business District in downtown Miami. Southern Miami-Dade County includes the Redland and Homestead areas, which make up the agricultural economy of the county. Agricultural Redland makes up roughly one third of Miami-Dade County's inhabited land area, and is sparsely populated, a stark contrast to the densely populated, urban portions of the county's northern sections.

The county includes portions of two national parks. To the west, the county extends into Everglades National Park and is populated only by a Miccosukee tribal village. Biscayne National Park and the Biscayne Bay Aquatic Preserves are located east of the mainland in Biscayne Bay.

== History ==
=== Native people ===
The earliest evidence of Native American settlement in the Miami region is from approximately 12,000 years ago. The first inhabitants settled on the banks of the Miami River, with the main villages on the northern banks.

The inhabitants at the time of first European contact were the Tequesta people, who controlled much of southeastern Florida, including present-day Miami-Dade County, Broward County, and the southern part of Palm Beach County. The Tequesta Indians fished, hunted, and gathered the fruit and roots of plants for food, but did engage in agriculture. They buried the small bones of the deceased with the rest of the body, and put the larger bones in a box for the village people to see. The Tequesta are credited with making the Miami Circle.

=== European explorers and settlers ===
Juan Ponce de León was the first European to visit the area in 1513 by sailing into Biscayne Bay. His journal records he reached Chequescha, a variant of Tequesta, which was Miami's first recorded name. It is unknown whether he came ashore or made contact with the natives. Pedro Menéndez de Avilés and his men made the first recorded landing when they visited the Tequesta settlement in 1566 while looking for Avilés' missing son, shipwrecked a year earlier. Spanish soldiers led by Father Francisco Villarreal built a Jesuit mission at the mouth of the Miami River a year later but it was short-lived. After the Spaniards left, the Tequesta Indians were left to fend themselves from European-introduced diseases like smallpox. By 1711, the Tequesta sent a couple of local chiefs to Havana, Cuba, to ask if they could migrate there. The Spanish sent two ships to help them, but Spanish illnesses struck and most of the Tequesta died.

The first permanent European settlers arrived in the early 19th century. People came from the Bahamas to South Florida and the Keys to hunt for treasure from the ships that ran aground on the treacherous Great Florida Reef. Some accepted Spanish land offers along the Miami River. At about the same time, the Seminole Indians arrived, along with a group of runaway slaves. The area was affected by the Second Seminole War, during which Major William S. Harney led several raids against the Indians. Most non-Indian residents were soldiers stationed at Fort Dallas. It was the most devastating Indian war in American history, causing almost a total loss of population in Miami.

After the Second Seminole War ended in 1842, William English re-established a plantation started by his uncle on the Miami River. He charted the "Village of Miami" on the south bank of the Miami River and sold several plots of land. In 1844, Miami became the county seat, and six years later a census reported there were ninety-six residents in the area. The Third Seminole War was not as destructive as the second, but it slowed the settlement of southeast Florida. At the end of the war, a few of the soldiers stayed.

=== Establishment ===
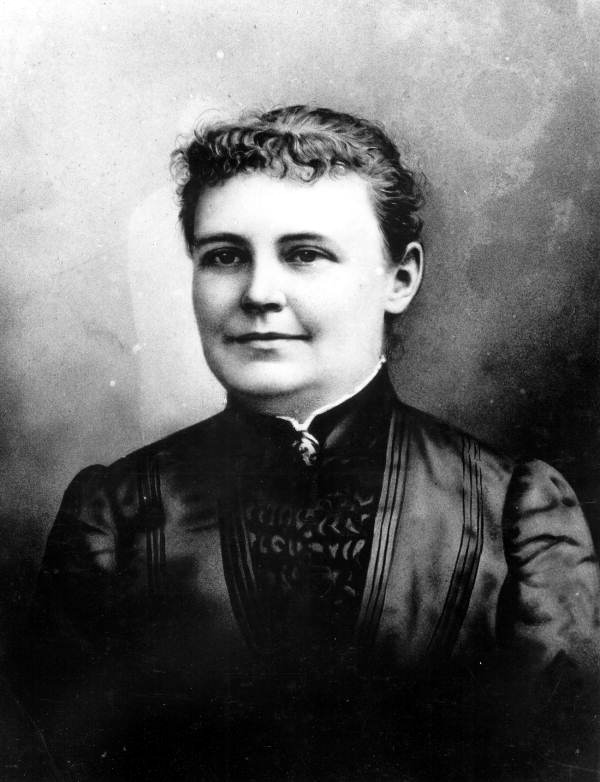
Julia Tuttle is credited as Miami's founder.

Dade County was created on February 4, 1836, under the Territorial Act of the United States. The county was named after Major Francis L. Dade, a soldier killed in 1835 in the Second Seminole War, at what has since been named the Dade Battlefield.

Originally, the county was set to be named "Pinckney County", after Thomas Pinckney, a statesman and diplomat from South Carolina who drafted the Treaty of San Lorenzo. The county's credited father, Richard Fitzpatrick, preferred this name as he was from South Carolina himself; however, when news reached Tallahassee of the Dade Massacre, the Territorial Legislative Council inserted Dade's name instead into a pending bill to create the new county.

At the time of its creation, Dade County included the land that now contains Palm Beach and Broward counties, together with the Florida Keys from Bahia Honda Key north and the land of present-day Miami-Dade County. The county seat was originally at Indian Key in the Florida Keys; then in 1844, the County seat was moved to Miami. The Florida Keys from Key Largo to Bahia Honda were returned to Monroe County in 1866. In 1888 the county seat was moved to Juno, near present-day Juno Beach, Florida, returning to Miami in 1899. In 1909, Palm Beach County was formed from the northern portion of what was Dade County, and then in 1915, Palm Beach County and Dade County contributed nearly equal portions of land to create what is now Broward County. There have been no significant boundary changes to the county since 1915.

=== Hurricane Andrew ===
The third-costliest natural disaster to occur in the United States was Hurricane Andrew, which hit Miami in the early morning of Monday, August 24, 1992. It struck the southern part of the county from due east, south of Miami and very near Homestead, Kendall, and Cutler Ridge, which was later renamed Cutler Bay. Damages exceeded US$25 billion in the county, and recovery took years in these areas where the destruction was greatest. Hurricane Andrew was the costliest natural disaster in U.S. history until Hurricane Katrina struck the Gulf region in 2005.

=== Name change ===
Miami-Dade County has previously attempted to change its name five times between 1958 and 1990, with voters rejecting each proposal. Below are the results of the previous elections to change the county's name:

Attempts to change the name of Miami-Dade County
Proposed name	Year	Yes	No
Miami County	1958	31%	69%
County of Miami	1963	34%	66%
Miami–Dade County	1976	34%	66%
Miami–Dade County	1984	27%	73%
Metropolitan Miami–Dade County	1990	13%	87%

On November 13, 1997, voters changed the name of the county from "Dade County" to "Miami-Dade County" to acknowledge the international name recognition of Miami. Voters were acting pursuant to home rule powers granted to Dade County, including the ability to change the name of the county without the consent of the Florida Legislature. With the name change, Miami-Dade County became the only county in the United States whose name was hyphenated.

== Geography ==
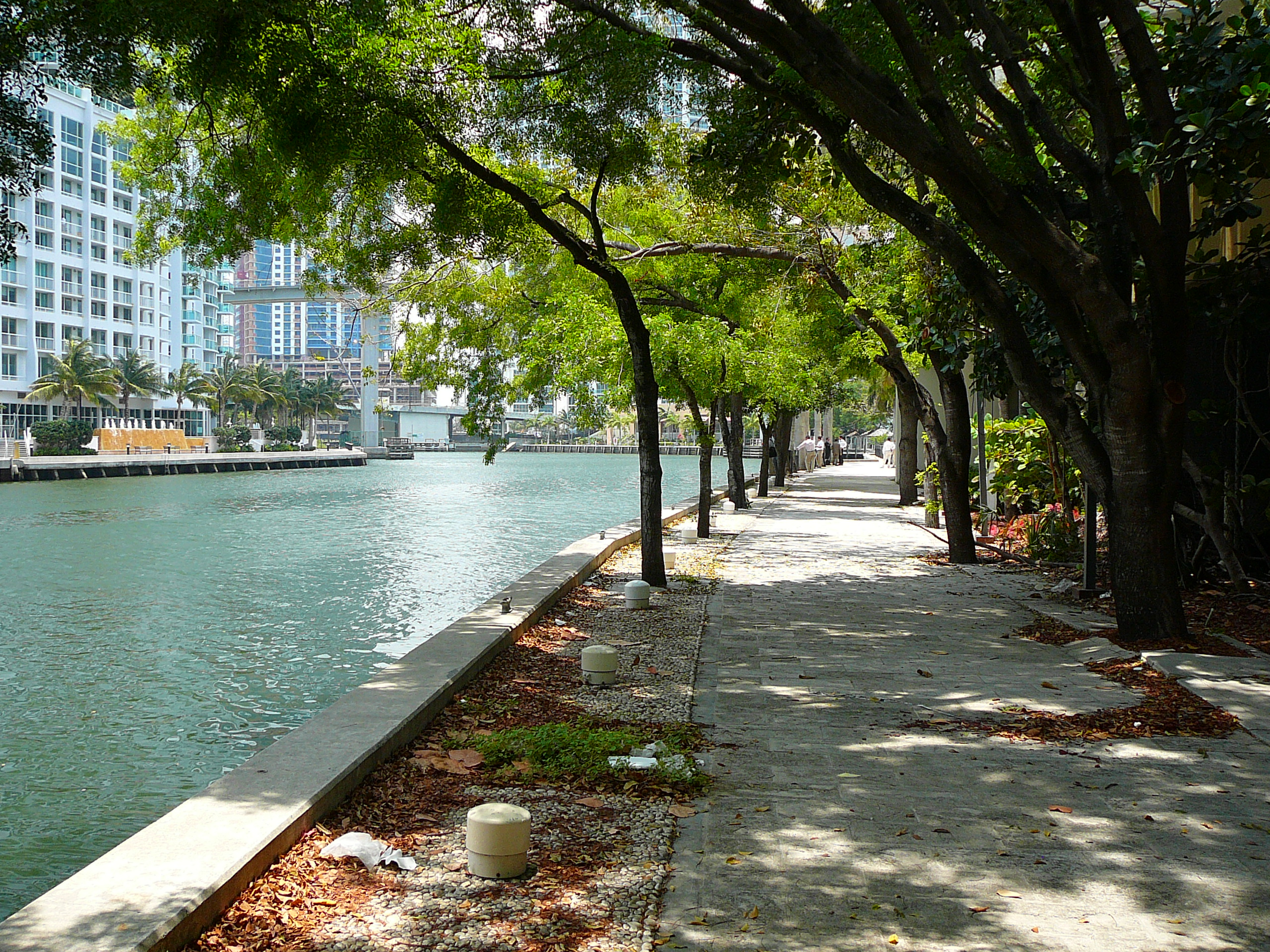
The Miami River in Downtown Miami in May 2008

Miami, Florida

Climate chart (precipitation, max. and min. temperature)
J	F	M	A	M	J	J	A	S	O	N	D
1.9 76 56	2.3 78 59	2.9 80 61	2.9 83 64	5.2 87 69	9.7 89 73	6.9 91 74	8.9 91 75	9.4 89 74	5.6 86 71	3 82 65	1.8 78 60
- █ Average max. and min. temperatures in °F
- █ Precipitation totals in inches
Metric conversion
J	F	M	A	M	J	J	A	S	O	N	D
48 25 13	58 26 15	74 27 16	74 28 18	132 30 20	246 32 23	175 33 24	226 33 24	239 32 23	142 30 22	76 28 18	46 26 15
- █ Average max. and min. temperatures in °C
- █ Precipitation totals in mm

According to the U.S. Census Bureau, the county has an area of 2,431 square miles (6,300 km^{2}), of which 1,898 square miles (4,920 km^{2}) is land and 533 square miles (1,380 km^{2}) (21.9%) is water. It is the third-largest county in Florida by land area and second-largest by total area. Most of the water is in the Biscayne Bay, with another significant portion in the adjacent Atlantic Ocean.

Miami-Dade County is only about 6 feet (1.8 m) above sea level. It is rather new geologically and is at the eastern edge of the Florida Platform, a carbonate plateau created millions of years ago. Eastern Dade is composed of Oolite limestone while western Dade is composed mostly of Bryozoa. Miami-Dade is among the last areas of Florida to be created and populated with fauna and flora, mostly in the Pleistocene.

The bay is divided from the Atlantic Ocean by many barrier islands along the coast. The city of Miami Beach, home to the South Beach neighborhood and its Art Deco district, is built on these barrier islands. The archipelago of the Florida Keys, which extends in an arc to the south-southwest, is only accessible through Miami-Dade County, although most of the Keys are part of neighboring Monroe County. Miami is 68 miles (109 km) from West Palm Beach, and 30 miles (48 km) from Fort Lauderdale.

=== Communities ===
Miami-Dade County includes 34 incorporated areas, 38 census-designated places, and 16 unincorporated regions.

=== Adjacent counties ===
- Broward County – north
- Monroe County – southwest
- Collier County – northwest

=== National protected areas ===
- Big Cypress National Preserve
- Biscayne National Park
- Everglades National Park

== Demographics ==
Historical population
Census	Pop.	Note	%±
1840	446		—
1850	159		−64.3%
1860	83		−47.8%
1870	85		2.4%
1880	257		202.4%
1890	861		235.0%
1900	4,955		475.5%
1910	11,933		140.8%
1920	42,753		258.3%
1930	142,955		234.4%
1940	267,739		87.3%
1950	495,084		84.9%
1960	935,047		88.9%
1970	1,267,792		35.6%
1980	1,625,781		28.2%
1990	1,937,094		19.1%
2000	2,253,362		16.3%
2010	2,496,435		10.8%
2020	2,701,767		8.2%
2025 (est.)	2,802,029	▲	3.7%
U.S. Decennial Census; 1840–1970 1980 1990; 2000 2010 2020 2022

=== Racial and ethnic composition ===
Miami-Dade County, Florida – Racial and ethnic composition Note: the US Census treats Hispanic/Latino as an ethnic category. This table excludes Latinos from the racial categories and assigns them to a separate category. Hispanics/Latinos may be of any race.
Race / Ethnicity (NH = Non-Hispanic)	Pop 1980	Pop 1990	Pop 2000	Pop 2010	Pop 2020	% 1980	% 1990	% 2000	% 2010	% 2020
White alone (NH)	754,443	585,607	465,772	383,551	361,517	46.40%	30.23%	20.67%	15.36%	13.38%
Black or African American alone (NH)	269,670	369,621	427,140	425,650	378,756	16.59%	19.08%	18.96%	17.05%	14.02%
Native American or Alaska Native alone (NH)	1,727	2,002	1,990	2,014	1,589	0.11%	0.10%	0.09%	0.08%	0.06%
Asian alone (NH)	12,264	24,054	30,537	35,841	41,672	0.75%	1.24%	1.36%	1.44%	1.54%
Native Hawaiian or Pacific Islander alone (NH)	x	x	524	468	385	x	x	0.02%	0.02%	0.01%
Other race alone (NH)	6,683	2,403	4,026	4,953	14,667	0.41%	0.12%	0.18%	0.20%	0.54%
Mixed race or Multiracial (NH)	x	x	31,636	20,099	46,243	x	x	1.40%	0.81%	1.71%
Hispanic or Latino (any race)	580,994	953,407	1,291,737	1,623,859	1,856,938	35.74%	49.22%	57.32%	65.05%	68.73%
Total	1,625,781	1,937,094	2,253,362	2,496,435	2,701,767	100.00%	100.00%	100.00%	100.00%	100.00%

Race	2020
White	29.5%
Black	14.8%
Asian	1.6%
Mixed	41.9%
Native American	0.3%
Other	11.8%
Population	2,701,767

Social demographic	2020	2010	2000	1990	1980
Households	1,074,685	989,435	852,278	692,355	609,830
Persons per household	2.51	2.52	2.64	2.80	2.67
Sex Ratio	92.6	93.8	93.5	92.0	89.5
Ages 0–17	19.4%	21.9%	24.8%	24.2%	24.0%
Ages 18–64	63.4%	64.0%	61.9%	61.8%	60.3%
Ages 65 +	17.2%	14.1%	13.3%	14.0%	15.7%
Median age	41.0	38.2	35.6	34.2	34.7
Population	2,701,767	2,496,435	2,253,362	1,937,094	1,625,781

Economic indicators
2018–22 American Community Survey	Miami-Dade County	Florida
Median income	$35,899	$37,826
Median household income	$64,215	$67,917
Poverty Rate	15.3%	12.9%
High school diploma	82.7%	89.3%
Bachelor's degree	32.5%	32.3%
Advanced degree	12.3%	12.1%

Language spoken at home (Note: Language spoken at home among residents at least five years old; only languages (or language groups) which at least 2% of residents have spoken at any time since 1980 are mentioned)	2020 (Note: Refers to 2018–2022 American Community Survey data; the last Decennial Census where language data was collected was in the 2000 census)	2010 (Note: Refers to 2008–2012 American Community Survey data; the last Decennial Census where language data was collected was in the 2000 census)	2000	1990	1980
English	24.9%	27.7%	32.1%	42.6%	57.2%
Spanish or Spanish Creole	66.5%	63.9%	59.2%	50.1%	36.3%
French or Haitian Creole	4.9%	5.0%	5.1%	3.8%	1.3%
Other Languages	3.8%	3.4%	3.6%	3.5%	1.3%

Nativity	2020 (Note: Refers to 2018–2022 American Community Survey data; the last Decennial Census where foreign-born population data was collected was in the 2000 census)	2010 (Note: Refers to 2008–2012 American Community Survey data; the last Decennial Census where foreign-born population data was collected was in the 2000 census)	2000	1990	1980
% population native-born	46.0%	48.8%	49.1%	54.9%	64.4%
... born in the United States	43.0%	45.7%	46.0%	51.5%	61.9%
... born in Puerto Rico or Island Areas	1.7%	2.0%	2.3%	2.3%	2.5%
... born to American parents abroad	1.3%	1.1%	0.7%	1.0%	2.5%
% population foreign-born (Note: Only countries of birth which at least 0.3% of residents were born in at any time since 1980 are mentioned)	54.0%	51.2%	50.9%	45.3%	35.6%
... born in Cuba	25.2%	24.0%	23.3%	22.1%	20.0%
... born in Venezuela	3.7%	1.6%	1.1%	0.5%	N/A (Note: Not counted separately; aggregated into "Other" category)
... born in Colombia	3.7%	3.5%	3.6%	2.2%	N/A
... born in Haiti	2.9%	3.0%	3.2%	2.3%	N/A
... born in Nicaragua	2.8%	3.3%	3.8%	3.5%	N/A
... born in Honduras	1.8%	1.9%	1.5%	0.8%	N/A
... born in the Dominican Republic	1.4%	1.5%	1.6%	0.8%	0.4%
... born in Peru	1.2%	1.3%	1.2%	0.8%	N/A
... born in Mexico	1.1%	1.1%	0.9%	0.5%	0.3%
... born in Argentina	1.0%	0.9%	0.7%	0.4%	N/A
... born in Jamaica	0.9%	1.1%	1.5%	1.6%	0.9%
... born in Guatemala	0.8%	0.6%	0.5%	0.3%	N/A
... born in Brazil	0.7%	0.5%	0.6%	0.2%	N/A
... born in Ecuador	0.7%	0.6%	0.6%	0.3%	N/A
... born in El Salvador	0.5%	0.6%	0.5%	0.3%	N/A
... born in Spain	0.4%	0.3%	0.4%	0.5%	N/A
... born in Chile	0.4%	0.4%	0.4%	0.4%	N/A
... born in Panama	0.3%	0.3%	0.3%	0.3%	N/A
... born in Italy	0.2%	0.2%	0.2%	0.2%	0.3%
... born in Russia	0.2%	0.1%	0.1%	1.0% (Note: Data from the 1980 census and 1990 census pertains to residents born anywhere in the Soviet Union, not just Russia)	1.0%
... born in Canada	0.2%	0.2%	0.2%	0.3%	0.5%
... born in the Bahamas	0.2%	0.2%	N/A	0.4%	N/A
... born in the United Kingdom	0.1%	0.1%	0.2%	0.3%	0.4%
... born in Germany	0.1%	0.2%	0.2%	0.3%	0.5%
... born in Poland	< 0.1%	0.1%	0.2%	0.3%	0.7%
... born in other countries	3.5%	5.2%	5.6%	6.9%	12.3%

=== 2020 census ===
As of the 2020 census, the county had a population of 2,701,767. The median age was 41.0 years. 19.4% of residents were under the age of 18 and 17.2% of residents were 65 years of age or older. For every 100 females there were 92.6 males, and for every 100 females age 18 and over there were 90.0 males age 18 and over.

The racial makeup of the county was 29.5% White, 14.8% Black or African American, 0.3% American Indian and Alaska Native, 1.6% Asian, <0.1% Native Hawaiian and Pacific Islander, 11.8% from some other race, and 41.9% from two or more races. Hispanic or Latino residents of any race comprised 68.7% of the population.

The most reported ancestries were:

- Cuban (34.2%)
- African American (5.6%)
- Colombian (4.8%)
- Venezuelan (4.4%)
- Nicaraguan (3.8%)
- Haitian (3.7%)
- Puerto Rican (3.1%)
- Dominican (2.5%)
- English (2.3%)
- Italian (2.3%)

99.1% of residents lived in urban areas, while 0.9% lived in rural areas.

There were 967,414 households in the county, of which 32.0% had children under the age of 18 living in them. Of all households, 42.2% were married-couple households, 18.6% were households with a male householder and no spouse or partner present, and 31.2% were households with a female householder and no spouse or partner present. About 23.9% of all households were made up of individuals and 9.5% had someone living alone who was 65 years of age or older.

There were 1,074,685 housing units, of which 10.0% were vacant. Among occupied housing units, 50.8% were owner-occupied and 49.2% were renter-occupied. The homeowner vacancy rate was 1.5% and the rental vacancy rate was 7.0%.

=== 2010 census ===
Residents of Miami-Dade County are often described as "Miamians". In 2010, Cubans made up the largest population of immigrants (with more than half of the population) with Colombians coming in second, Haitians in third, followed by Nicaraguans in fourth place, then Dominicans, Venezuelans, Peruvians, Jamaicans, Mexicans, and Argentinians among the highest group of immigrants.

Miami-Dade has small communities of Brazilians, Portuguese, Spaniards, Ukrainians and Poles along with Canadians (including Francophone from the province of Quebec), French, Germans, other Europeans, British expatriates and Israelis.

There were 867,352 households, out of which 30.6% had children under the age of 18 living with them, 43.8% were married couples living together, 18.8% had a female householder with no husband present, and 30.5% were non-families. 23.6% of all households were made up of individuals, and 8.4% (2.5% male and 5.9% female) had someone living alone who was 65 years of age or older. The average household size was 2.83 and the average family size was 3.33.

The age distribution is 21.9% under the age of 18, 9.9% from 18 to 24, 28.6% from 25 to 44, 25.6% from 45 to 64, and 14.1% who were 65 years of age or older. The median age was 38.2 years. For every 100 females, there were 93.8 males. For every 100 females age 18 and over, there were 91.0 males.

The median income for a household in the county was $43,605, and the median income for a family was $50,065. Males had a median income of $35,096 versus $29,980 for females. The per capita income for the county was $22,957. About 13.8% of families and 17.2% of the population were below the poverty line, including 22.0% of those under age 18 and 22.1% of those aged 65 or over.

In 2010, 51.1% of the county's population was foreign born, with 48.7% being naturalized American citizens. Of foreign-born residents, 93.0% were born in Latin America, 3.2% were born in Europe, 2.7% born in Asia, 0.5% born in Africa, 0.5% in North America, and 0.1% were born in Oceania.

Population	Miami-Dade
2020 Census	2,701,767
2010 Census	2,496,435
2000 Census	2,253,362
1990 Census	1,937,094

=== Languages ===
As of 2010, 28.1% of the population spoke only English at home, while 63.8% of the population spoke Spanish, 4.2% spoke French Creole (mainly Haitian Creole), 0.6% French, and 0.6% Portuguese. About 52% of the county residents were born outside the United States, while 71.9% of the population spoke a language other than English at home.

=== Religious statistics ===
In 2010 statistics, the largest religious group in Miami-Dade County was the Archdiocese of Miami with 544,449 Catholics in 65 parishes, followed by 96,749 non-denominational adherents with 197 congregations, 80,123 SBC Baptists with 313 congregations, 47,921 NBC Baptists with 44 congregations, 27,901 Seventh-day Adventists in 62 congregations, 25,244 AoG Pentecostals with 45 congregations, 14,628 LDS Mormons with 18 congregations, 12,569 TEC Episcopalians with 30 congregations, and 11,880 UMC Methodists with 32 congregations. There is an estimated 23,064 Muslims with 15 congregations, 3,069 Hindus with 7 congregations, and 1,342 Buddhist with 17 congregations.

In 2005 the Jewish population of the county has decreased but stabilized at about 121,000 with a high percentage of retired and elderly persons (but less than in Broward and Palm Beach counties). There are more than 60 congregations, 34 Jewish educational institutions, and three Jewish community centers. The highest percentage and increase in Jewish population is in North Dade, especially in Aventura. Miami-Dade County hosts Florida's third largest Jewish population and the nation's tenth largest.

Altogether, 39.8% of the population was claimed as members by religious congregations, although members of historically African-American denominations were underrepresented due to incomplete information. In 2014, Miami-Dade County had 731 religious organizations, the 14th most out of all US counties.

== Law, government, and politics ==
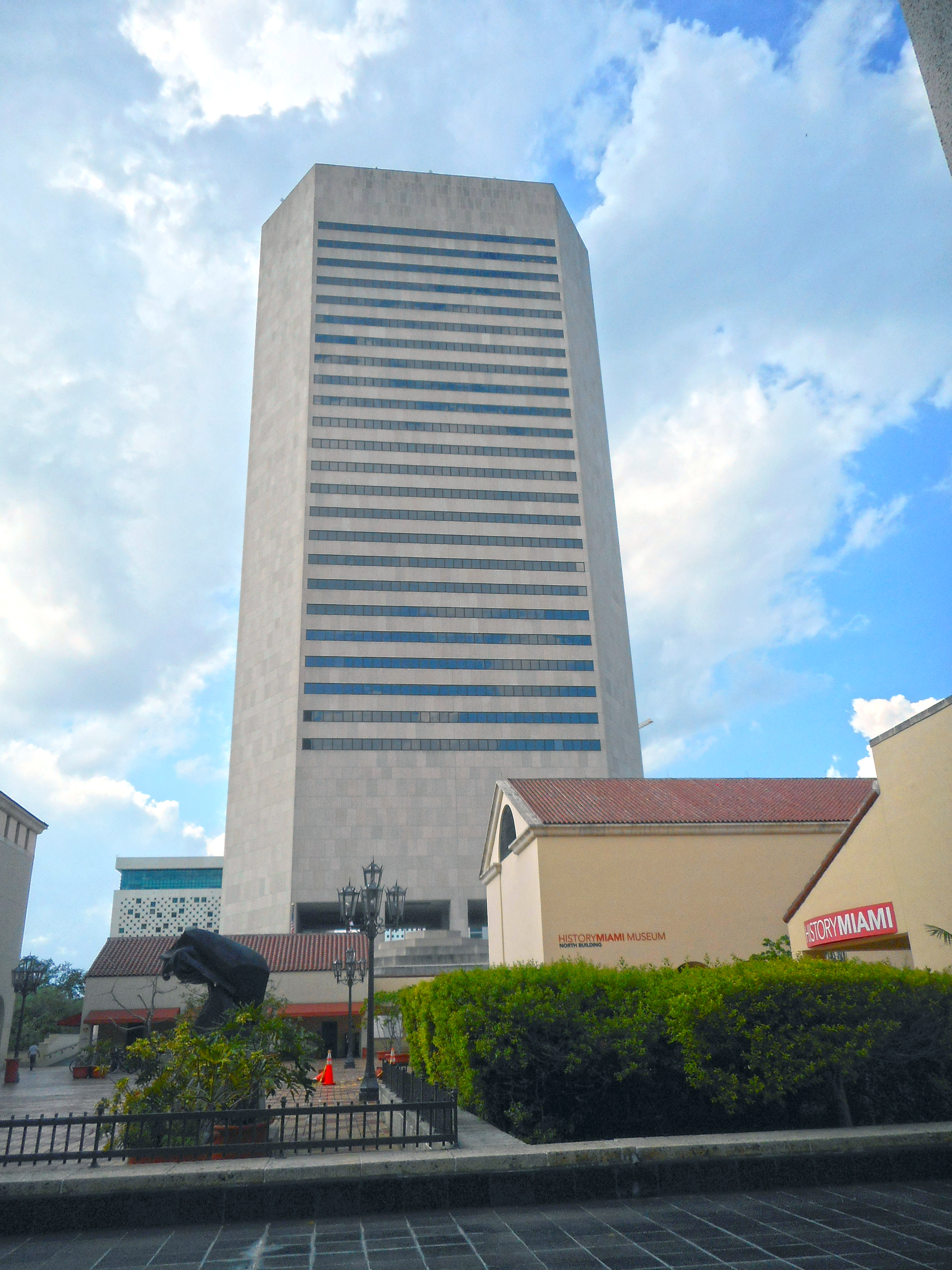
The Stephen P. Clark Government Center, June 2018

Miami-Dade County has operated under a metropolitan system of government, a "two-tier federation", since 1957. This was made possible when Florida voters approved a constitutional amendment in 1956 that allowed the people of Dade County (as it was known) to enact a home rule charter. Prior to this year, home rule did not exist in Florida, and all counties were limited to the same set of powers by the Florida Constitution and state law.

Unlike a consolidated city-county, where the city and county governments merge into a single entity, these two entities are separate. Instead there are two "tiers", or levels, of government: city and county. There are 34 municipalities in the county, the City of Miami being the largest.

Cities are the "lower tier" of local government, providing police and fire protection, zoning and code enforcement, and other typical city services within their jurisdiction. These services are paid for by city taxes. The county is the "upper tier", and it provides services of a metropolitan nature, such as emergency management, airport and seaport operations, public housing and health care services, transportation, environmental services, solid waste disposal etc. These are funded by county taxes, which are assessed on all incorporated and unincorporated areas.

Of the county's 2.6 million total residents (as of 2013), approximately 52% live in unincorporated areas, the majority of which are heavily suburbanized. These residents are part of the Unincorporated Municipal Services Area (UMSA). For these residents, the County fills the role of both lower- and upper-tier government, the County Commission acting as their lower-tier municipal representative body. Residents within UMSA pay a UMSA tax, equivalent to a city tax, which is used to provide County residents with equivalent city services (police, fire, zoning, water and sewer, etc.). Residents of incorporated areas do not pay UMSA tax.

=== Structure of county government ===
The Mayor of Miami-Dade County is elected countywide to serve a four-year term and is considered a "strong mayor". The mayor is not a member of the County Commission, appoints all 25 directors who oversee the operations of the County Departments and has veto power over the commission. A mayoral appointment and veto can only be overridden by a two-thirds majority of the County Commission. The post is occupied by Daniella Levine Cava, the county's first female mayor.

The Board of County Commissioners is the legislative body, consisting of 13 members elected from single-member districts. Members are elected to serve four-year terms, and elections of members are staggered. The board chooses a chairperson, who presides over the commission, as well as appoints the members of its legislative committees. The board has a wide array of powers to enact legislation, create departments, and regulate businesses operating within the county. It also has the power to override the mayor's veto with a two-thirds vote.

Florida's Constitution provides for five elected officials to oversee executive and administrative functions for each county (called "Constitutional Officers"): Sheriff, Property Appraiser, Supervisor of Elections, Tax Collector, and Clerk of the Circuit Court (also functions as Comptroller). However, the Constitution allows voters in home-rule counties (including Miami-Dade) to abolish the offices and reorganize them as subordinate County departments; Miami-Dade voters chose this option for Sheriff, Supervisor of Elections, and Tax Collector. The offices of Clerk of the Circuit Court, State Attorney, and Public Defender are still branches of State government and are, therefore, independently elected and not part of County government.

Miami-Dade was the only county in Florida prior to January 6, 2024, that did not have an elected sheriff or a "Sheriff's Office". Instead, the county's law enforcement agency was known as the Miami-Dade Police Department, and its leader was known as the Metropolitan Sheriff and Director of the Miami-Dade Police Department; Nonetheless, its badges bore the inscription, "Deputy Sheriff, Sheriff's Office, Dade County, FLA."

=== Politics ===
==== Overview ====
Miami-Dade County has voted for the Democratic Party candidate in most of the presidential elections in the past four decades, and had gone Democratic in every election since 1992, until 2024, when it voted for Republican Donald Trump over Democrat Kamala Harris. It did vote twice for Ronald Reagan (1980, 1984) and once for George H. W. Bush (1988). From 1904 to 1972, it supported the Democratic candidate in all but four elections, though Republicans won it during their landslide victories in 1928, 1952, 1956, and 1972. Every Republican who carried the county won the presidential election.

Miami-Dade did vote for Republican governor Jeb Bush in 1998 and 2002, after voting against him in his unsuccessful 1994 run. Republicans lost the county in gubernatorial elections from 2006 to 2018, before Ron DeSantis won the county in 2022.

The Democrats had expanded their winning margin in each of the three elections from 2008 to 2016; in 2008 and 2012, Democrat Barack Obama averaged 59.69% of the vote. In 2016, Democrat Hillary Clinton won 63.22% of the vote, but still lost Florida by 1.2% despite winning the highest vote share in the county since 1964. In the 2018 midterms, Democrats Bill Nelson and Andrew Gillum were unable to replicate Clinton's margin in the county for U.S. Senate and governor, resulting in both of them losing narrowly statewide.

The trend would continue in 2020, as Democrat Joe Biden won 53.31% of the vote in the county, winning it by just over seven percent over Republican Donald Trump. The county swung 22 points to the right from 2016 to 2020. Biden received slightly fewer votes than Hillary Clinton in the county, despite Trump gaining nearly 200,000 more votes compared to 2016. This was attributed to a large swing of Cuban Americans, Venezuelan Americans, and other Hispanic Americans to the Republican Party, resulting in the best Republican performance since 2004. This contributed to Biden losing Florida in 2020, becoming the first Democrat to win the presidency without Florida since 1992.

In the 2020s, Miami-Dade has become Republican-leaning. In the 2022 gubernatorial and 2022 U.S. Senate elections, Republicans Ron DeSantis and Marco Rubio respectively won the county. DeSantis became the first Republican Governor to win Miami-Dade since Jeb Bush in 2002. Rubio won the county for the second time, following his victory in 2010. In 2024, Republican Donald Trump won the county by a comfortable 11-point margin due to its heavy shift to the right, Florida being his home state, and its large Cuban population, making him the first Republican since George H. W. Bush in 1988 to carry the county. The county shifted an additional 19 points to the right from 2020 to 2024. Similarly, Florida U.S. Senator Rick Scott concurrently won the county in 2024, after having lost it in his previous 2018 run. In a further indicator of the county's shift to the right, Republicans gained the registration advantage in 2025.

Miami-Dade County is represented in the United States House of Representatives by Republicans Maria Elvira Salazar, Carlos Gimenez and Mario Diaz-Balart of the 27th, 28th and 26th districts, and Democrat Frederica Wilson of the 24th district.

United States presidential election results for Miami-Dade County, Florida
Year	Republican		Democratic		Third party(ies)	
Year	No.	%	No.	%	No.	%
1892	0	0.00%	109	95.61%	5	4.39%
1896	368	46.46%	372	46.97%	52	6.57%
1900	389	28.50%	806	59.05%	170	12.45%
1904	307	24.08%	887	69.57%	81	6.35%
1908	275	17.34%	961	60.59%	350	22.07%
1912	99	5.56%	1,171	65.71%	512	28.73%
1916	629	21.94%	1,654	57.69%	584	20.37%
1920	3,077	38.09%	4,288	53.08%	713	8.83%
1924	2,753	26.01%	3,474	32.83%	4,356	41.16%
1928	15,860	60.15%	10,136	38.44%	372	1.41%
1932	9,244	34.16%	17,820	65.84%	0	0.00%
1936	10,295	26.88%	28,007	73.12%	0	0.00%
1940	25,224	32.70%	51,921	67.30%	0	0.00%
1944	30,357	33.56%	60,100	66.44%	0	0.00%
1948	41,301	37.04%	59,681	53.52%	10,530	9.44%
1952	122,174	56.77%	93,022	43.23%	0	0.00%
1956	130,938	55.37%	105,559	44.63%	0	0.00%
1960	134,506	42.35%	183,114	57.65%	0	0.00%
1964	117,480	35.99%	208,941	64.01%	0	0.00%
1968	135,222	37.02%	176,689	48.37%	53,391	14.62%
1972	256,529	58.87%	177,693	40.78%	1,541	0.35%
1976	211,148	40.45%	303,047	58.06%	7,747	1.48%
1980	265,888	50.65%	210,868	40.17%	48,149	9.17%
1984	324,414	59.17%	223,863	40.83%	35	0.01%
1988	270,937	55.26%	216,970	44.26%	2,358	0.48%
1992	235,313	43.19%	254,609	46.73%	54,921	10.08%
1996	209,740	37.87%	317,555	57.34%	26,487	4.78%
2000	289,574	46.29%	328,867	52.57%	7,111	1.14%
2004	361,095	46.61%	409,732	52.89%	3,899	0.50%
2008	360,551	41.70%	499,831	57.81%	4,254	0.49%
2012	332,981	37.87%	541,440	61.58%	4,758	0.54%
2016	333,999	33.83%	624,146	63.22%	29,046	2.94%
2020	532,833	45.98%	617,864	53.31%	8,221	0.71%
2024	605,590	55.35%	480,355	43.90%	8,160	0.75%

Registered voters as of September 30, 2026
Total population	2,701,767 (2020 census)	
Registered voters	1,308,436	~48%
Democratic	416,103	31.80%
Republican	460,976	35.23%
Republican-Democratic spread	+44,873	+3.43%
Minor parties	35,570	2.72%
No party preference	395,787	30.25%

Previous gubernatorial elections results
Year	Republican	Democratic	Third parties
2022	55.3% 393,532	44.0% 312,972	0.7% 5,347
2018	39.0% 311,581	59.8% 478,958	1.1% 8,483
2014	39.3% 205,017	58.4% 304,721	2.2% 11,684
2010	42.0% 204,918	56.2% 274,638	1.8% 8,332
2006	45.3% 183,457	53.3% 215,930	1.4% 5,558
2002	53.0% 266,107	46.5% 233,469	0.6% 2,878
1998	52.5% 200,801	47.5% 181,724	0.0% 0
1994	48.0% 198,371	52.0% 215,276	0.0% 1
1990	37.3% 138,417	62.7% 232,542	0.0% 2

== Economy ==
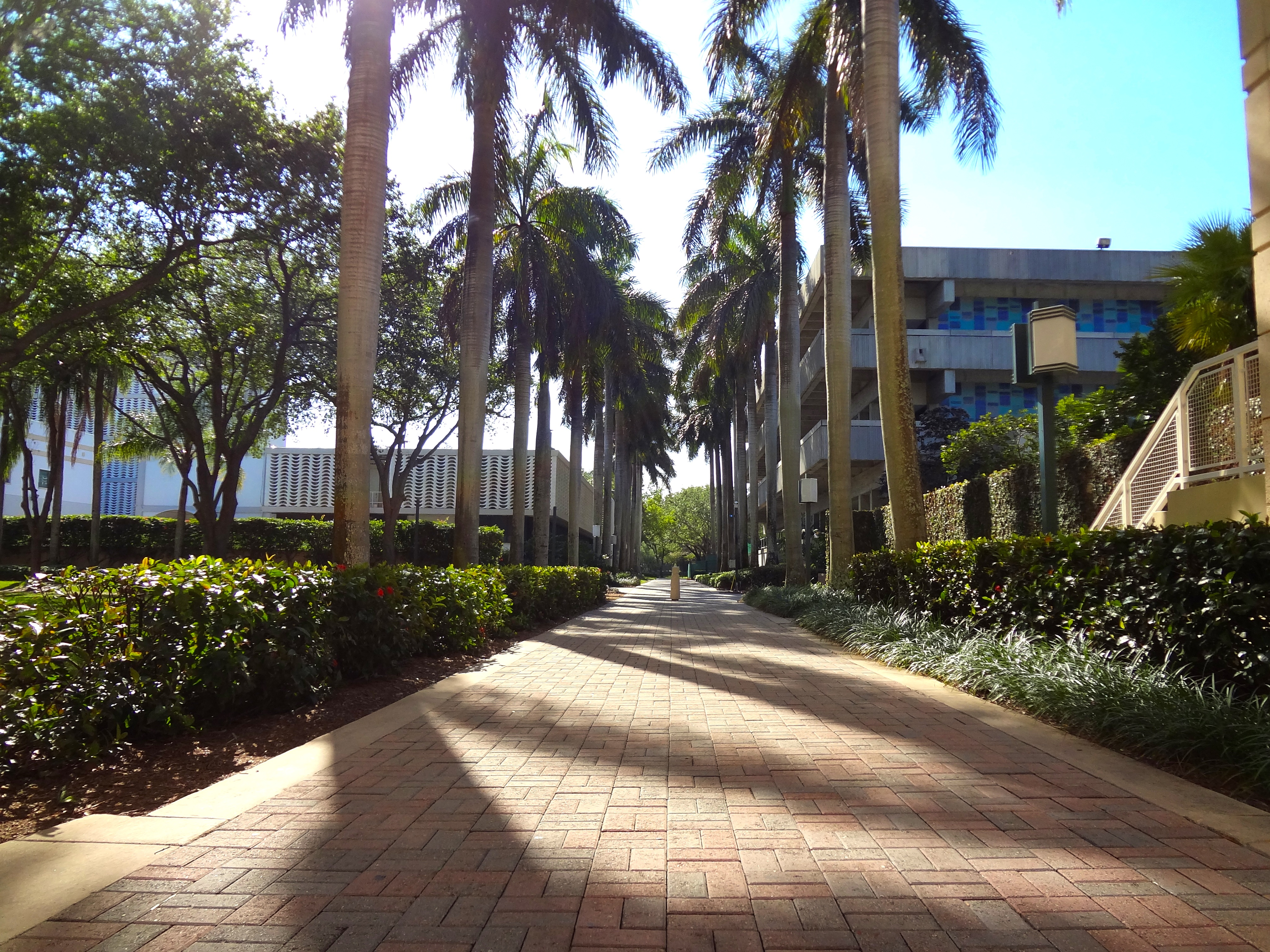
With 16,479 employees as of 2021, the University of Miami in Coral Gables is the county's second-largest employer after Baptist Health South Florida.

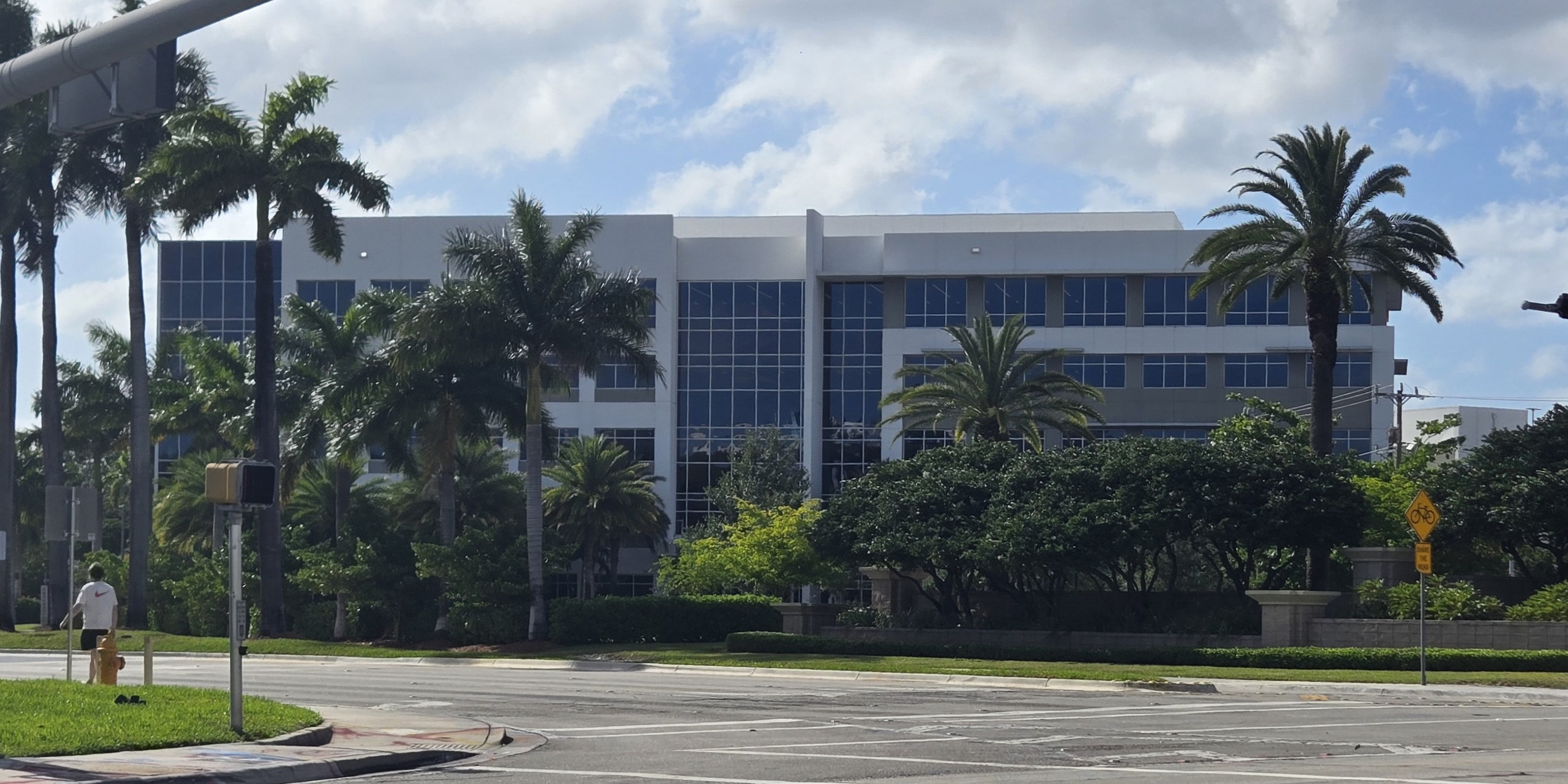
The headquarters of Burger King in April 2025

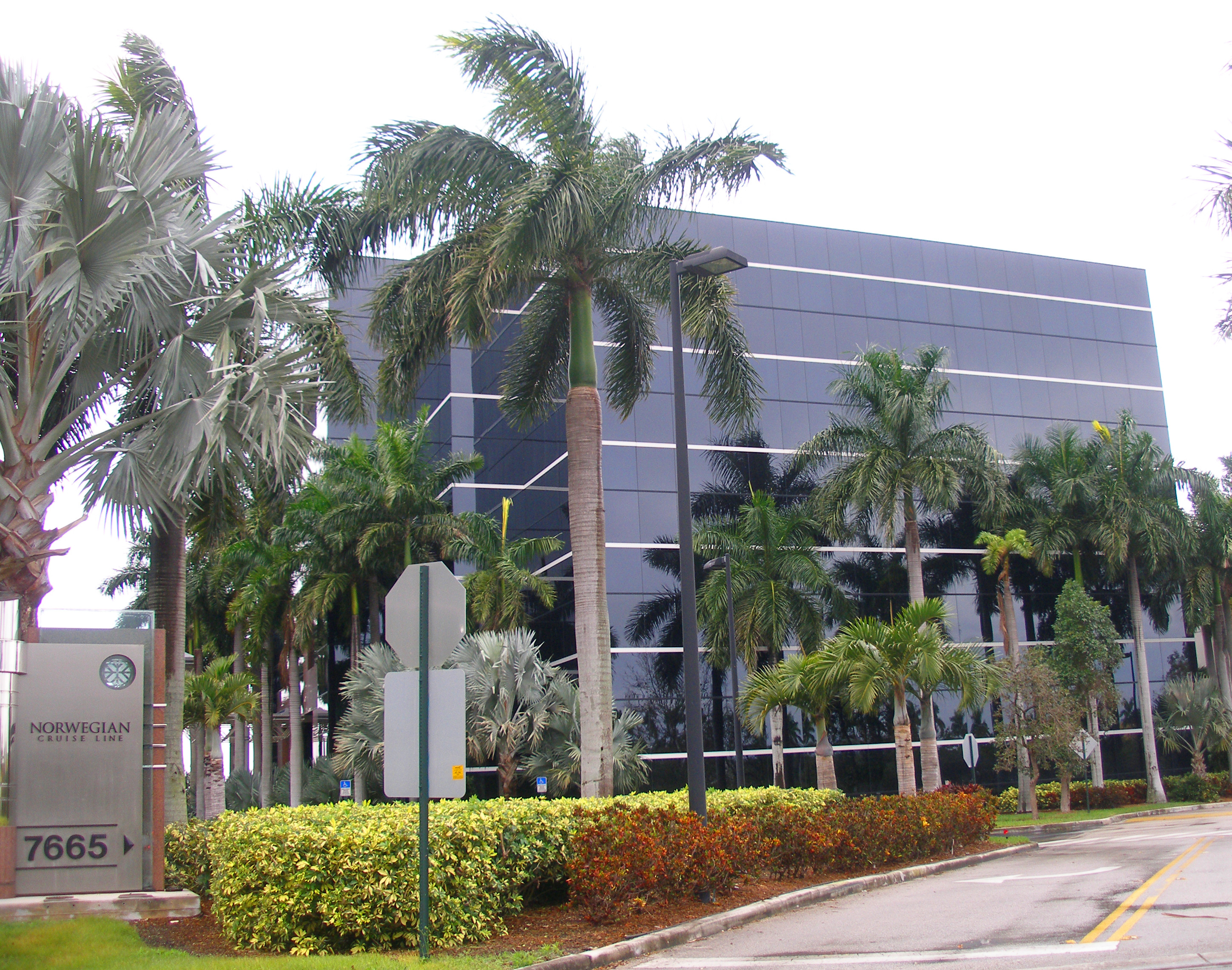
The headquarters of Norwegian Cruise Line in January 2008

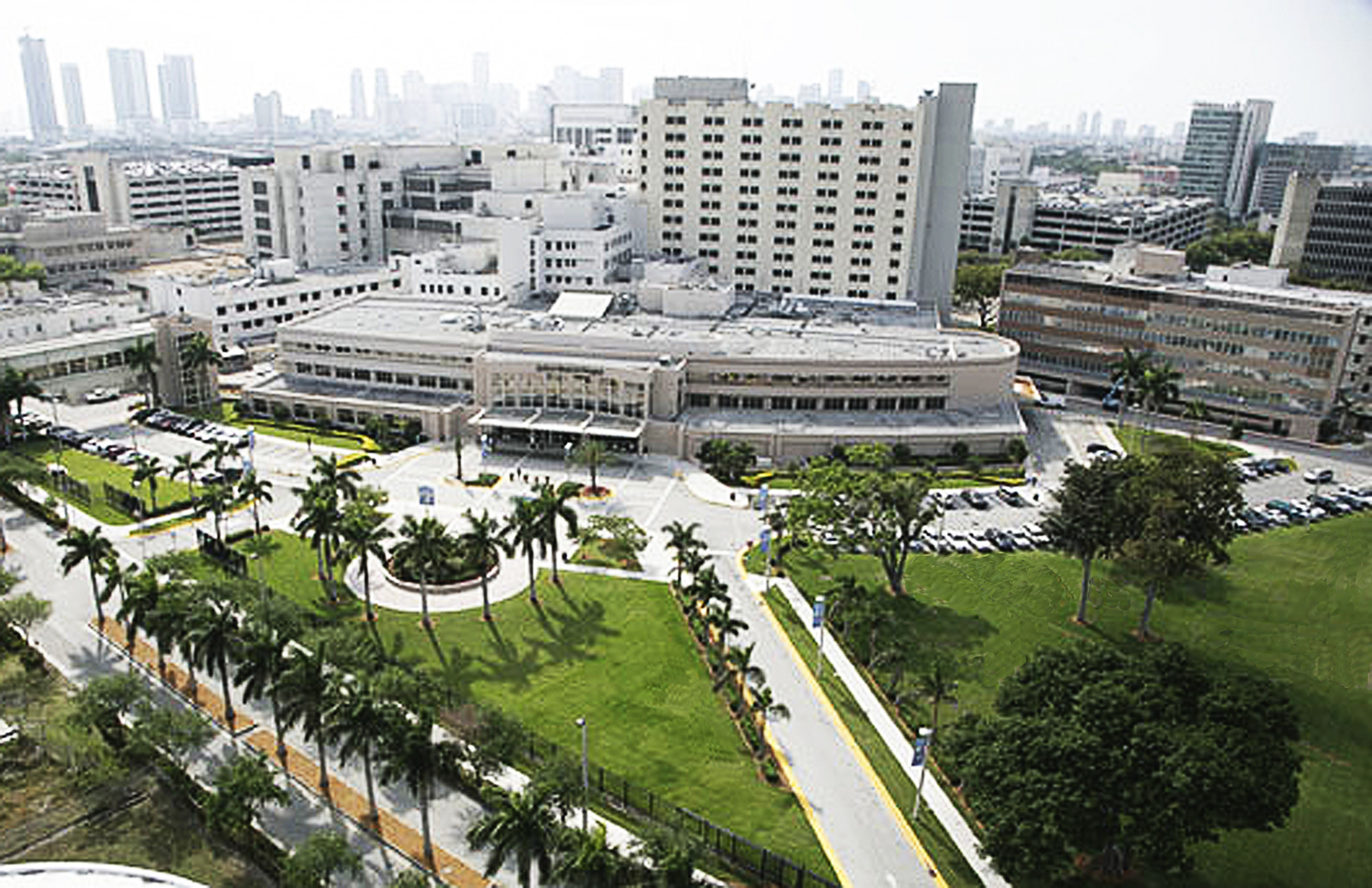
Jackson Memorial Hospital in Miami, the primary teaching hospital of the University of Miami's Miller School of Medicine and the largest hospital in the United States with 1,547 beds

Brightstar Corporation, Burger King, Intradeco Holdings, Latin Flavors, Norwegian Cruise Line, Lennar and Ryder have their headquarters in unincorporated areas in the county. Centurion Air Cargo, Florida West International Airways, IBC Airways, and World Atlantic Airlines have their headquarters on the grounds of Miami International Airport in an unincorporated area in the county.

Hewlett Packard's main Latin America offices are on the ninth floor of the Waterford Building in unincorporated Miami-Dade County.

Other companies with offices in an unincorporated area not in any CDP:

- AstraZeneca's Latin American headquarters
- Gategroup's Latin American headquarters
- Unicomer Group's United States offices
- Goya Foods's Miami office

Several defunct airlines, including Airlift International, Arrow Air, Gulfstream International Airlines, National Airlines, and Rich International Airways, were headquartered on or near the airport property.

After Frank Borman became president of Eastern Airlines in 1975, he moved Eastern's headquarters from Rockefeller Center in Midtown Manhattan, New York City to an unincorporated area in Miami-Dade County. Around 1991 the Miami-Dade County lost a few corporations, including Eastern Airlines, which folded in 1991.

At one time the cruise line ResidenSea had its headquarters in an unincorporated area in the county.

=== Top private employers ===
According to Miami's Beacon Council, the top private employers in 2014 in Miami-Dade were:

#	Employer	# of employees
1	University of Miami	12,818
2	Baptist Health South Florida	11,353
3	American Airlines	11,031
4	Carnival Cruise Line	3,500
5	Nicklaus Children's Hospital	3,500
6	Mount Sinai Medical Center	3,321
7	Florida Power & Light	3,011
8	Royal Caribbean International	2,989
9	Wells Fargo	2,050
10	Bank of America	2,000

=== Top government employers ===
According to Miami's Beacon Council, the top government employers in 2014 in the county were:

#	Employer	# of employees
1	Miami-Dade County Public Schools	33,477
2	Miami-Dade County	25,502
3	U.S. federal government	19,200
4	Florida state government	17,100
5	Jackson Health System	9,800

== Agriculture ==
Most of the state's summer okra (Abelmoschus esculentus) is grown here, totalling 1,000 to 1,500 acres (400 to 610 ha) over the whole year. It is grown as a "scavenger crop", one grown to scavenge the benefits of residual fumigant and fertilizer. The most problematic pest is the melon thrips (Thrips palmi) but aphids are also significant. Although the silverleaf whitefly (sweet potato whitefly, Bemisia tabaci) reproduces in large numbers on this crop, the plant is not seriously harmed and the feeding damage is quickly repaired. This does still leave okra as a problematic refuge from which the whitefly will migrate, to nearby tomato, bean, and ornamentals. The University of Florida provides a production handbook which recommends disease management and weed management practices.

Methyl bromide (MB) has been phased out and Telone products – fumigants – are heavily regulated here. Miami-Dade County heavily regulates Telone more than the rest of the state does. Therefore, the best MB alternatives here are either metam sodium or metam potassium, both combined with chloropicrin.

Miami-Dade has some of the lowest Cry 1F resistance in the country. Despite its high volume of cargo traffic with Puerto Rico and earlier speculation, none of Puerto Rico's extreme Cry1F-r genetics seems to have spread to this area. Southern Florida in general has the lowest in the country (including Puerto Rico).

The state's first invasion of the peach fruit fly (Bactrocera zonata) began here. An adult male fly was found on November 10, 2010, on a guava tree (Psidium guajava). The state responded by trapping an 81 square miles (210 km^{2}) are around the site.

The little fire ant (Wasmannia auropunctata) is an invasive agricultural pest here. In fact the first recorded invasion of the state was in 1924 in Coconut Grove (which was then near Miami and has since been incorporated into the city).

Miami-Dade County has the largest greenhousing/nursery industry in the state, but on the other hand produces very little of its own livestock.

== Public services ==
=== Fire rescue ===
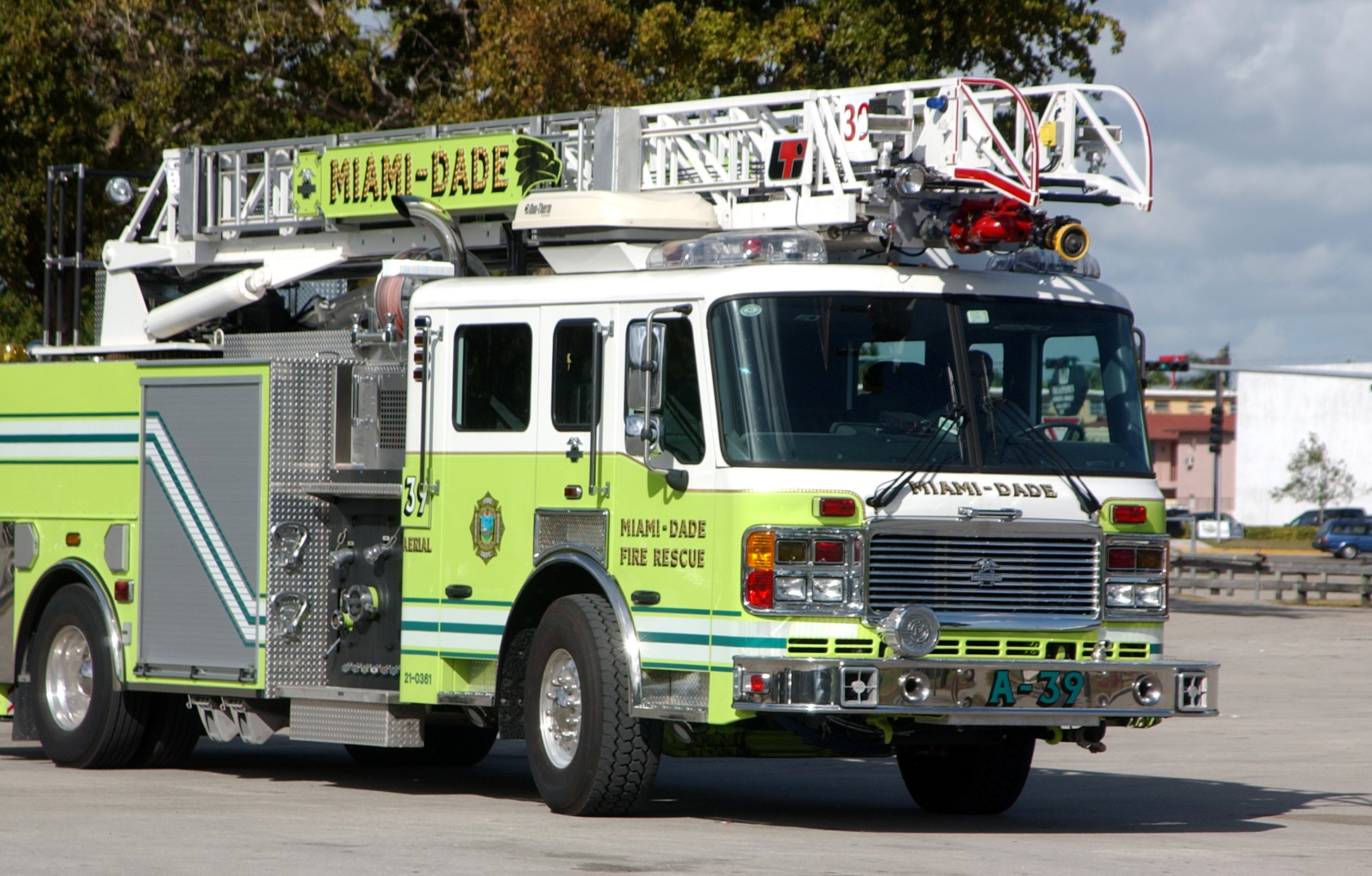
The Miami-Dade Fire Rescue Department

Miami-Dade Fire Rescue (MDFR) is the agency that provides fire protection and emergency medical services for Miami-Dade County, Florida. The department serves 29 municipalities and all unincorporated areas of Miami-Dade County from 60 fire stations. The department also provides fire protection services for Miami International Airport, Miami Executive Airport and Opa-locka Airport.

The communities served are Aventura, Bal Harbour, Bay Harbor Islands, Biscayne Park, Cutler Bay, Doral, El Portal, Florida City, Golden Beach, Hialeah Gardens, Homestead, Indian Creek, Medley, Miami Gardens, Miami Lakes, Miami Shores, Miami Springs, North Bay Village, North Miami, North Miami Beach, Opa-locka, Palmetto Bay, Pinecrest, South Miami, Surfside, Sweetwater, Sunny Isles Beach, Virginia Gardens, and West Miami.

Miami-Dade Fire Rescue is also the home to Urban Search and Rescue Florida Task Force 1 as well as EMS operations consisting of 57 Advanced Life Support units staffed by 760 state-certified paramedics and 640 state-certified emergency medical technicians.

Miami Fire Rescue is the agency provides fire protection and emergency medical services for the City of Miami, Florida. (Not to be confused with Miami-Dade Fire Rescue.) The department serves the City of Miami independently from the Miami-Dade Fire Rescue Department from 15 fire stations.

Hialeah Fire Rescue is the agency that provides fire protection and emergency medical services for Hialeah, Florida. The department serves the City of Hialeah independently from the Miami-Dade Fire Rescue Department from 9 stations.

Miami Beach Fire Rescue is the agency that provides fire protection and emergency medical services for Miami Beach, Florida. The department serves the City of Miami Beach independently from the Miami-Dade Fire Rescue Department from 4 stations.

Coral Gables Fire Rescue is the agency that provides fire protection and emergency medical services for Coral Gables, Florida. The department serves the City of Coral Gables independently from the Miami-Dade Fire Rescue Department from 3 stations.

Key Biscayne Fire Rescue is the agency that provides fire protection and emergency medical services for Key Biscayne, Florida. The department serves the Village of Key Biscayne independently from the Miami-Dade Fire Rescue Department from 1 station.

=== Law Enforcement ===
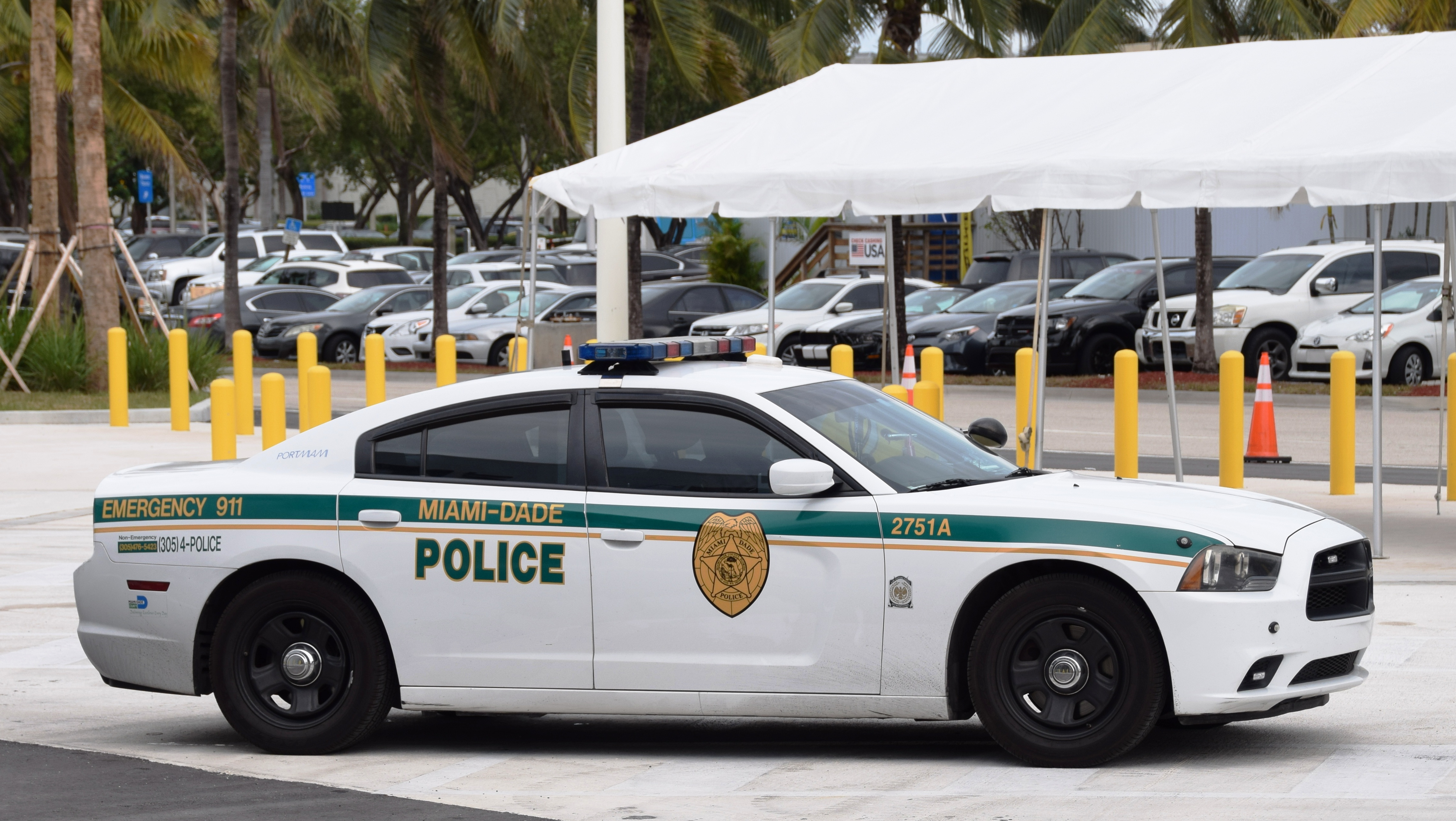
A Miami-Dade Police Department vehicle

The Miami-Dade Sheriff's Office is a full-service metropolitan police department serving Miami-Dade County's unincorporated areas, although it has lenient mutual aid agreements with other municipalities, most often the City of Miami Police Department. With 4,700 employees, it is Florida's largest police agency. The department is often referred to by its former name, the Metro-Dade Police or simply Metro.

The Miami-Dade Sheriff's Office operates out of nine districts throughout the county and has two special bureaus. The sheriff of the department is Rosie Cordero-Stutz, who succeeded Alfredo Ramirez. The department's headquarters are in Doral, Florida.

All incorporated communities within Miami-Dade County operate police departments, that work in conjunction with the Miami-Dade Sheriff's Office. The departments are as follows, in descending alphabetical order. Bold text denotes independent Wikipedia page.

- Aventura Police Department
- Bal Harbour Police Department
- Bay Harbor Islands Police Department
- Biscayne Park Police Department
- Coral Gables Police Department
- Cutler Bay Police Department
- Doral Police Department
- El Portal Police Department
- Florida City Police Department
- Golden Beach Police Department
- Hialeah Police Department
- Hialeah Gardens Police Department
- Homestead Police Department
- Indian Creek Police Department
- Key Biscayne Police Department
- Medley Police Department
- **Miami Police Department**
- **Miami Beach Police Department**
- **Miami Gardens Police Department**
- Miami Lakes Police Department
- Miami Shores Police Department
- Miami Springs Police Department
- North Bay Village Police Department
- North Miami Police Department
- North Miami Beach Police Department
- Opa-locka Police Department
- Palmetto Bay Police Department
- Pinecrest Police Department
- South Miami Police Department
- Sunny Isles Beach Police Department
- Surfside Police Department
- Sweetwater Police Department
- Virginia Gardens Police Department
- West Miami Police Department

=== Water and sewer department ===
Miami-Dade Water and Sewer Department (MDWASD) is one of the largest public utilities in the United States, employing approximately 2,700 employees as of 2007. It provides service to over 2.4 million customers, operating with an annual budget of almost $400 million. Approximately 330 million gallons of water are drawn every day from the Biscayne Aquifer for consumer use. MDWASD has over 7,100 miles (11,400 km) of water lines, a service area of 396 square miles (1,026 km^{2}) and 14 pump stations. MDWASD has over 3,600 miles (5,800 km) of sewage pipes, a service area of 341 square miles (883 km^{2}) and 954 pump stations. Miami-Dade County is also in the jurisdiction of the South Dade Soil and Water Conservation District.

=== Corrections department ===
Miami-Dade County Corrections and Rehabilitation Department is the correction agency.

=== Aviation department ===
The Miami-Dade Aviation Department (MDAD) operates Miami International Airport, Miami Executive Airport, Opa-locka Executive Airport, Homestead General Aviation Airport, and Dade-Collier Training and Transition Airport.

=== County representation ===
The Florida Department of Juvenile Justice operates the Miami-Dade Regional Juvenile Detention Center in an unincorporated area in the county.

=== Public libraries ===
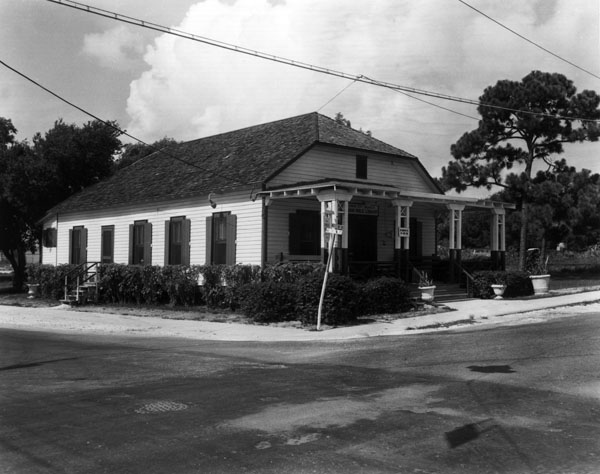
Lemon City Branch Library, c. 1955

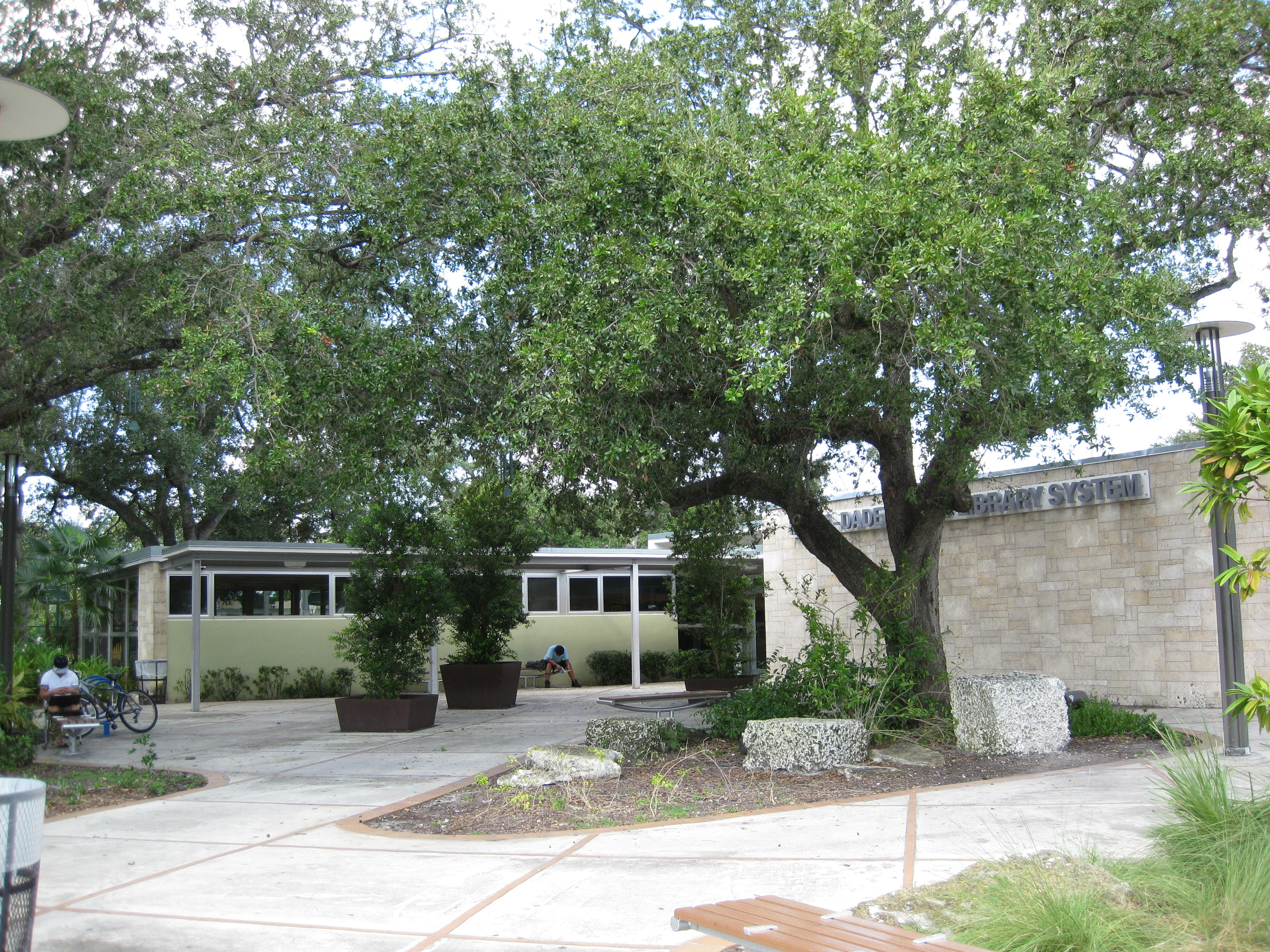
Shenandoah Branch Library in November 2015

The Miami-Dade Public Library System traces its origin to the late nineteenth century. The first library was a reading room established in Lemon City on April 7, 1894, by the Lemon City Library and Improvement Association. In 1942 neighborhood libraries were brought together in a single public library system, governed by a board of trustees and administered by a Head Librarian. A new central library building had been proposed for Bayfront Park in Downtown Miami as early as 1938, but the proposal was not realized till over a decade later. In December 1965 the City of Miami and Metropolitan Dade County agreed that the City of Miami would provide public library service to unincorporated Dade County and to those municipalities that did not provide their library service with four bookmobiles provided library service to the unincorporated area. On November 1, 1971, the City of Miami transferred its library system to Metropolitan Dade County which created a new Department of Libraries with a Director reporting directly to the County Manager.

On November 7, 1972, Dade County voters approved a referendum, also known as the "Decade of Progress" bonds, authorized approximately $553 million for public improvement projects in Dade County. Of that amount, approximately $34.7 million was authorized for public libraries, including construction, renovation, land acquisition, furnishings, and equipment. Between 1976 and 1990, this bond issue provided the funds to open 14 new libraries. On August 24, 1992, Hurricane Andrew inflicted significant damage on the library system, destroying all branches south of Kendall Drive. Over the next years, no further expansion of the system was funded and no new libraries opened. It was not until the fall of 2001, when Mayor Alex Penelas and Board of County Commissioners voted to increase the library system's budget which provided funding for capital improvement initiatives—making way for the opening of 18 new libraries by 2011. As of 2017, 15 of these libraries have been opened, with the remaining 3 still under construction.

Today Miami-Dade Public Library System serves a population of 2,496,435, provides services for the Miami-Dade County except for the cities of Bal Harbour, Hialeah, Homestead, Miami Shores, North Miami, North Miami Beach and Surfside. It has forty-nine branches, two bookmobiles and one technobus. The Miami-Dade County Board of County Commissioners governs the Miami-Dade Public Library System.

== Education ==
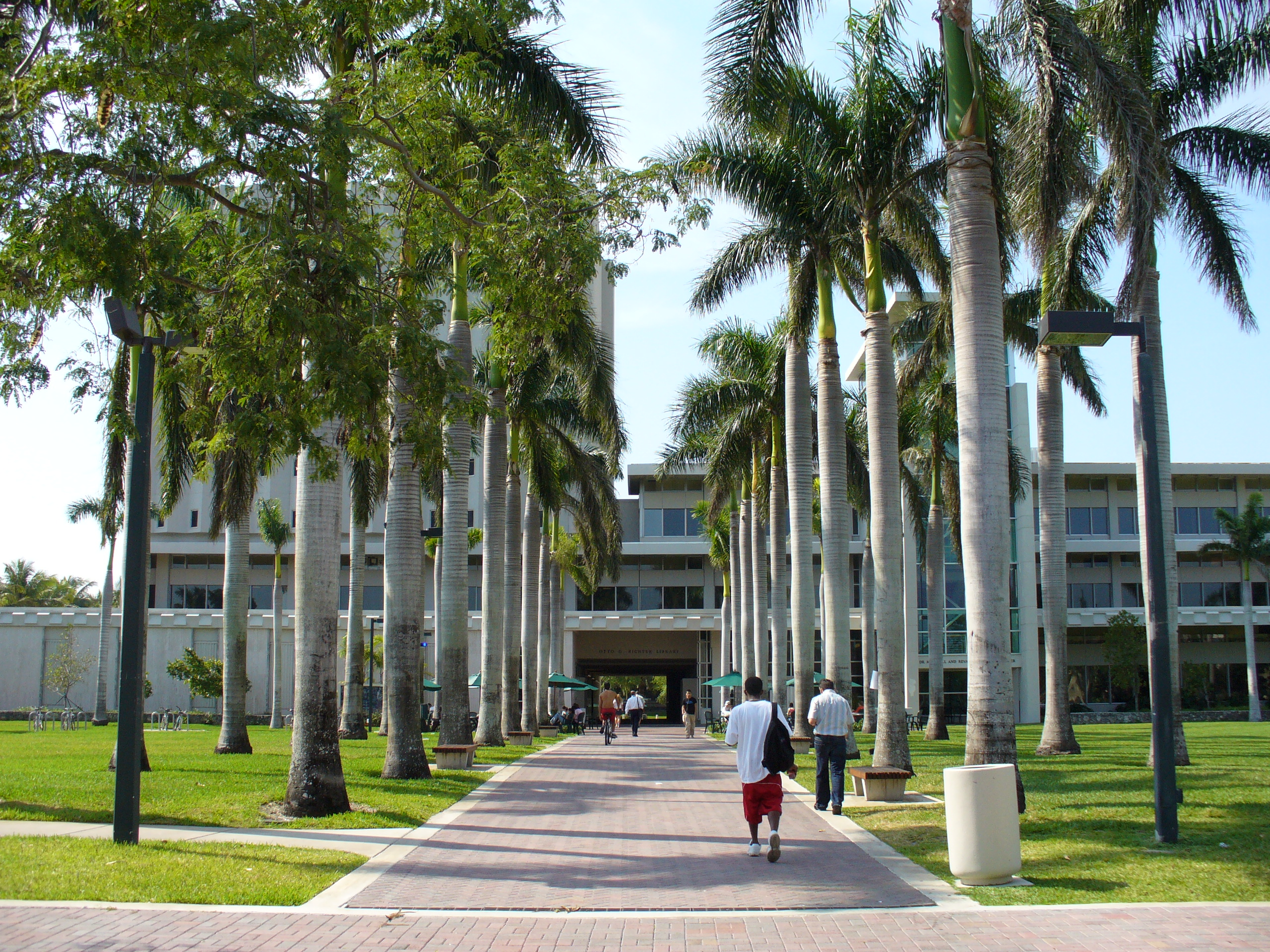
The University of Miami in Coral Gables, April 2006

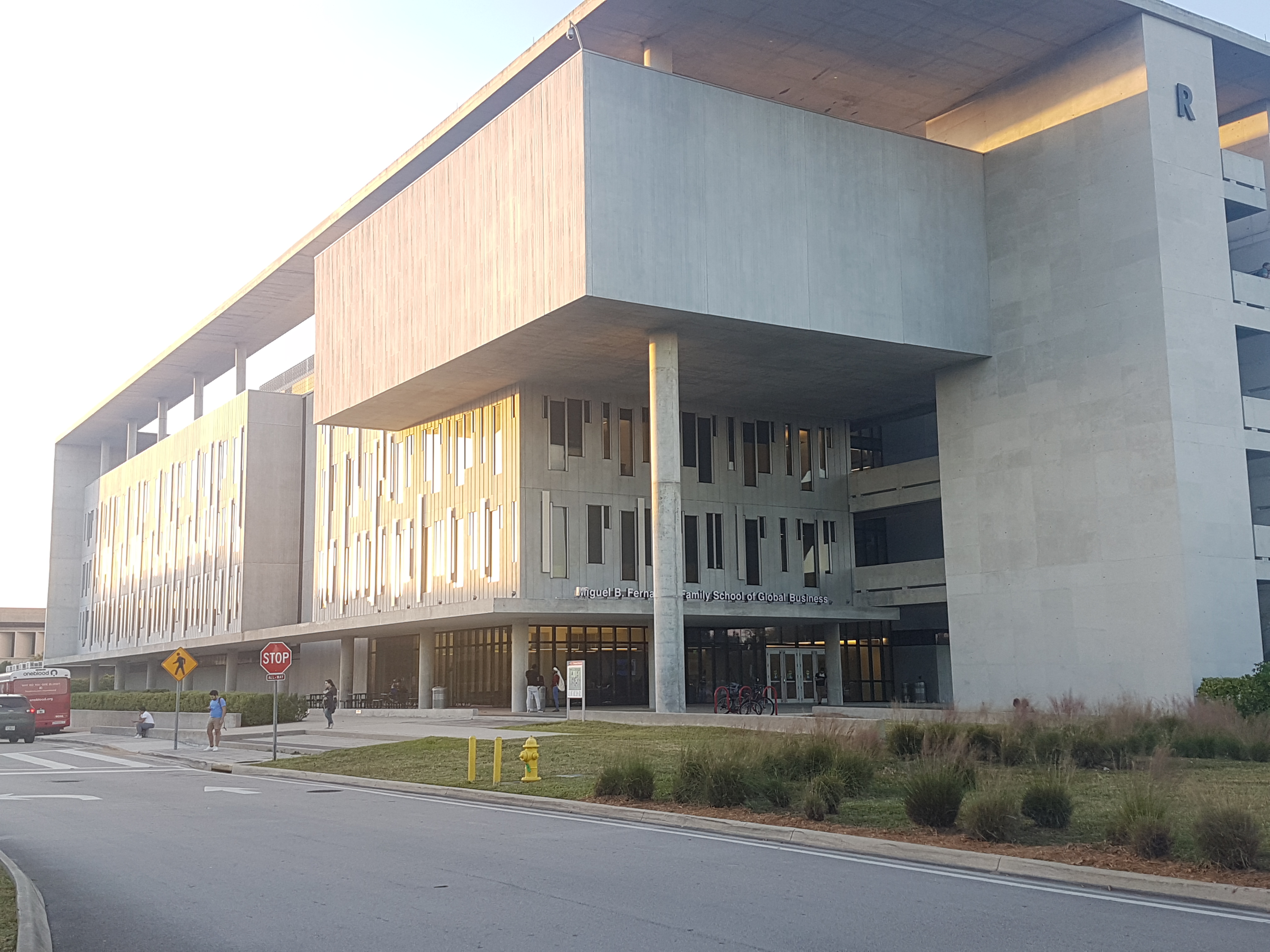
Miami Dade College in Miami, December 2019

=== Colleges and universities ===
The University of Miami, located in Coral Gables, is among the top-tier research universities in the United States, and is the highest ranked private university in Florida.

As of 2020, Florida International University, located in Westchester (in the University Park area), is the fifth largest university by enrollment in the United States. Miami Dade College, located in Miami, has the second largest undergraduate enrollment of any U.S. college or university with over 100,000 students.

A full list of colleges and universities:

- University of Miami (private)
- Florida International University (public)
- Miami Dade College (public)
- Barry University (private/Catholic)
- Nova Southeastern University (private)
- Florida National University (private)
- Florida Memorial University (private/historically black)
- St. Thomas University (private/Catholic)
- Johnson & Wales University (private)
- Carlos Albizu University (private)
- Miami International University of Art & Design (private)
- Yeshiva V'Kollel Beis Moshe Chaim (private/Jewish)
- Miami Ad School (private)
- Southeastern College (private)

=== Primary and secondary (K-12) schools ===
In Florida, each county is also a school district, and Miami-Dade County Public Schools is such for the county. The district is operated by an independently elected School Board. A professional Superintendent of Schools appointed by the School Board manages the district's day-to-day operations. As of 2014, the Miami-Dade County Public School District is the fourth-largest public school district in the nation with almost 360,000 students.

The Miami-Dade Public Library is one of the country's largest public library systems. It has 50 branch locations and others under construction.

Miami-Dade County is home to many private and public primary and secondary schools.

MDCPS public

- American
- Braddock
- Carol City
- Central
- Coral Gables
- Coral Park
- Cutler Bay
- Edison
- Ferguson
- Goleman
- Hialeah
- Hialeah Gardens
- Hialeah-Miami Lakes
- Homestead
- Jackson
- Killian
- Krop
- Miami
- Miami Beach
- Miami Springs
- Mourning
- Norland
- North Miami
- North Miami Beach
- Northwestern
- Palmetto
- Reagan/Doral
- South Dade
- South Miami
- Southridge
- Southwest Miami
- Sunset
- Varela
- Westland
- Washington
- Coral Reef
- DASH
- Martí MAST
- MAST Academy
- MAST @ FIU
- MAST @ Homestead
- Miami Lakes Ed Ctr
- New World
- Robert Morgan
- School for Advanced Studies
- Turner Tech
- TERRA ERI
- Young Men's Prep
- Young Women's Prep

Charter

- Don Soffer Aventura High School
- Doral Academy Preparatory School
- Sports Leadership and Management Charter School

Tribal

- Miccosukee Indian School (affiliated with the Bureau of Indian Education)

Private

- Belen Jesuit Preparatory School
- Carrollton School of the Sacred Heart
- Christopher Columbus High School
- The Cushman School
- Our Lady of Lourdes Academy
- Gulliver Schools
- Monsignor Edward Pace High School
- Miami Country Day School
- Ransom Everglades School
- Riviera Schools
- St. Brendan High School
- Palmer Trinity School
- Westminster Christian School

== Sites of interest ==
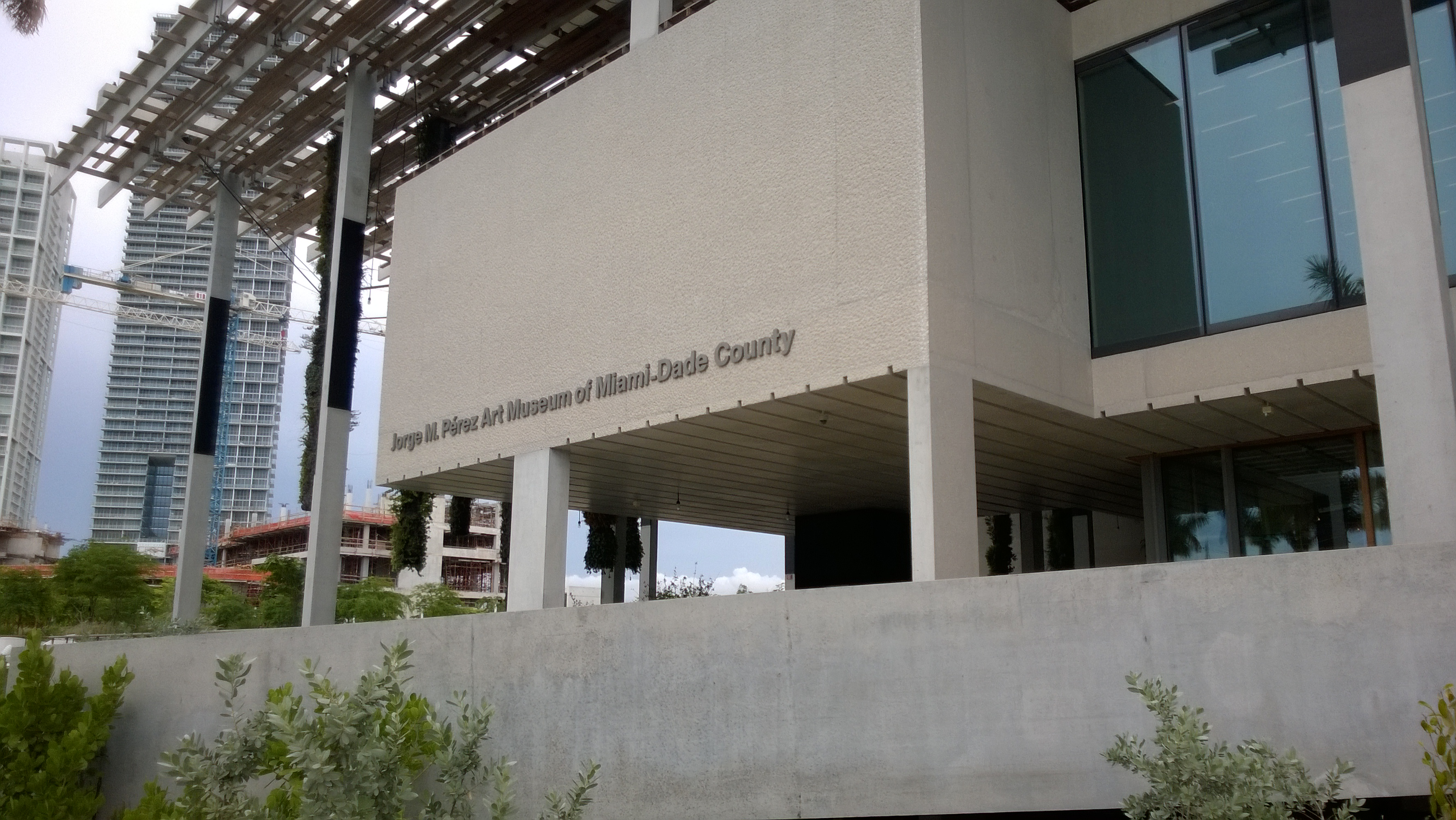
The Pérez Art Museum in Downtown Miami in July 2014

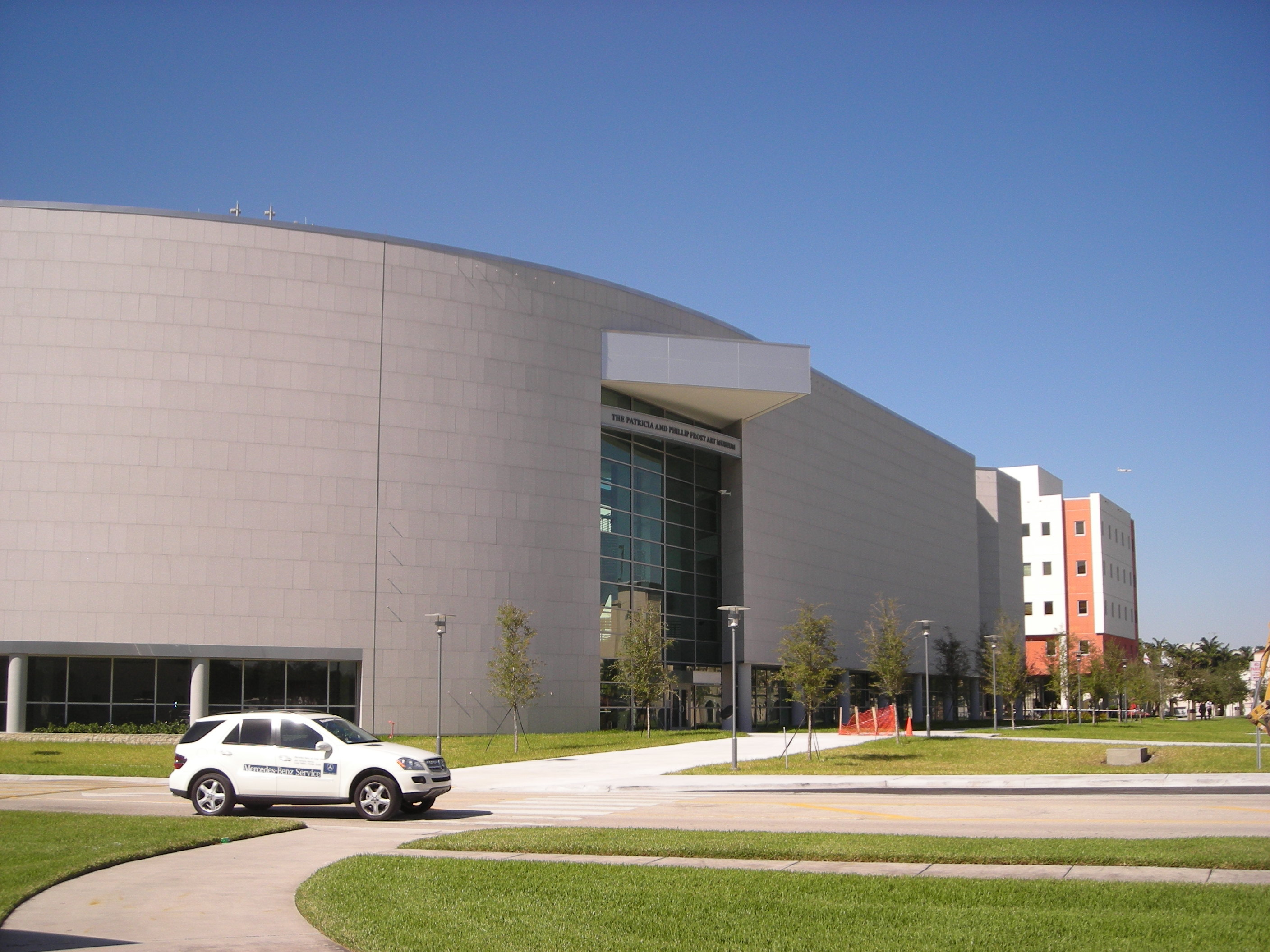
Frost Art Museum at Florida International University in April 2009

=== Museums ===
- Bass Museum of Art, Miami Beach
- Coral Castle, Homestead Miami
- Coral Gables Police and Fire Station, Coral Gables
- Fairchild Tropical Botanic Garden, Coral Gables
- Frost Art Museum, (Florida International University, Miami)
- Gold Coast Railroad Museum, Miami
- HistoryMiami, Downtown Miami
- Holocaust Memorial, Miami Beach
- Jewish Museum of Florida, Miami Beach
- Lowe Art Museum, (University of Miami, Coral Gables)
- Miami Children's Museum, Miami
- Museum of Contemporary Art, North Miami
- Pérez Art Museum Miami, Miami
- Phillip and Patricia Frost Museum of Science, Miami
- Vizcaya Museum and Gardens, Miami
- Wings Over Miami Museum, Miami
- Wolfsonian, (Florida International University, Miami Beach)

=== Culture and wildlife ===
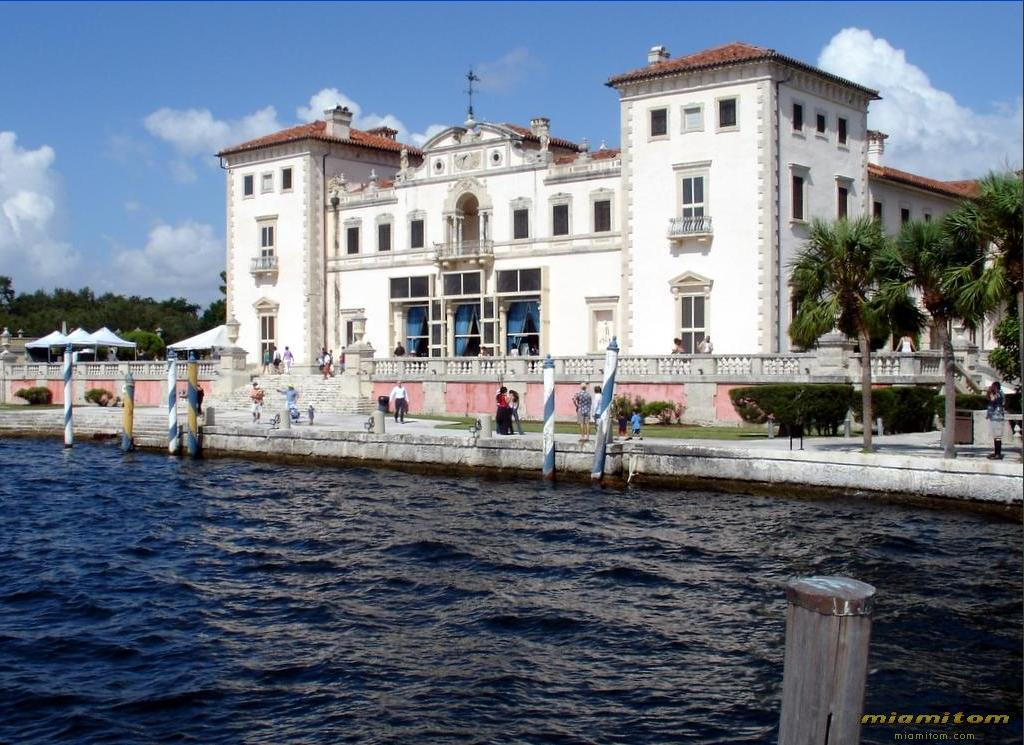
Vizcaya Museum and Gardens in Coconut Grove in June 2007

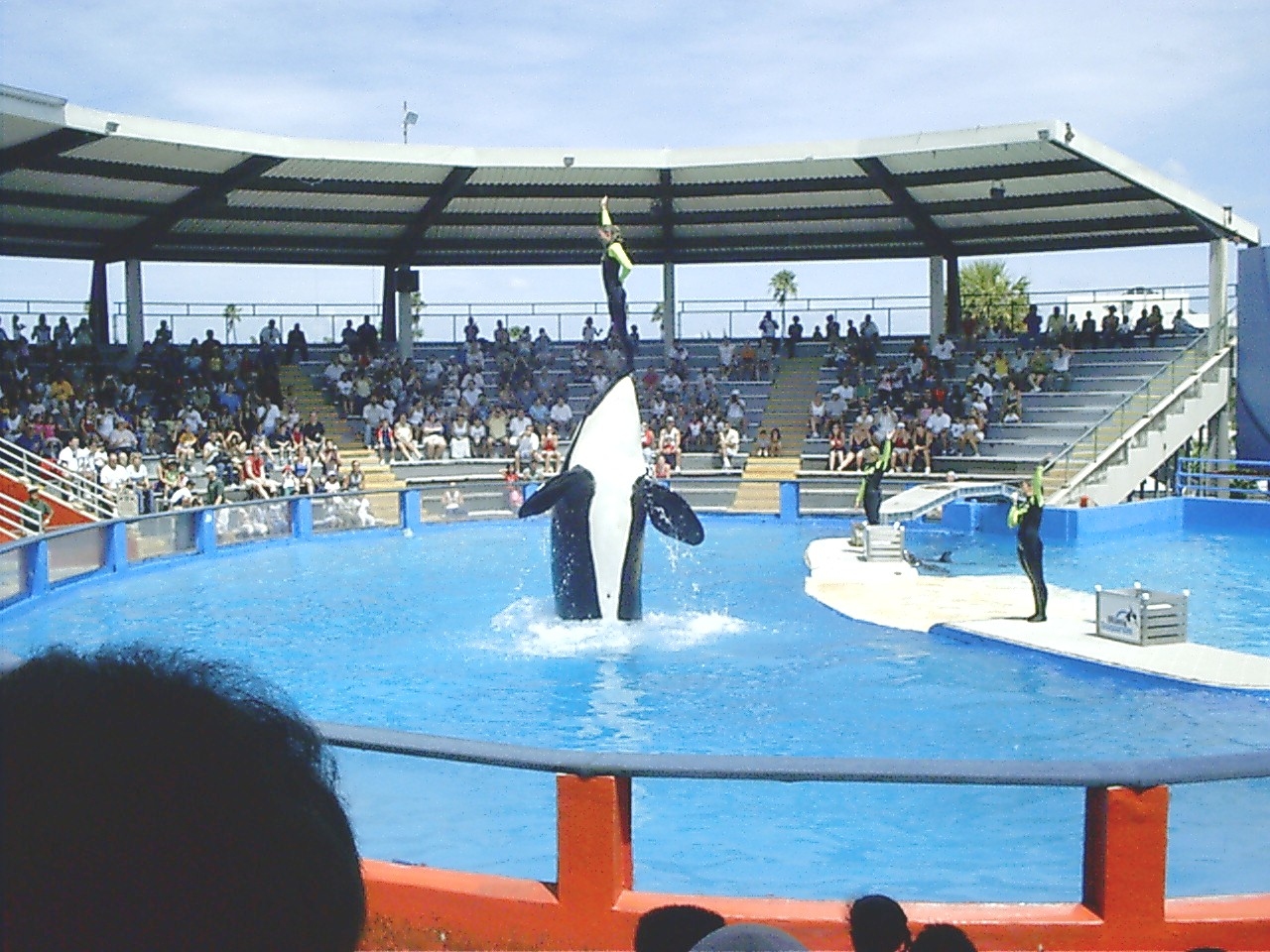
Miami Seaquarium in Virginia Key in October 2006

- Adrienne Arsht Center for the Performing Arts, Downtown Miami
- Ancient Spanish Monastery, North Miami Beach
- Bayfront Park Amphitheatre, Downtown Miami
- Bayside Marketplace, Downtown Miami
- Colony Theatre, Miami Beach
- Florida Grand Opera, Miami
- Gusman Center for the Performing Arts, Downtown Miami
- Jungle Island, Miami
- Miami New Drama, Miami Beach
- Miami Seaquarium, Miami
- Monkey Jungle, Miami
- Vizcaya Museum and Gardens, Miami
- Wertheim Performing Arts Center, (Florida International University, Miami)
- Zoo Miami, Miami

=== Other areas and attractions ===
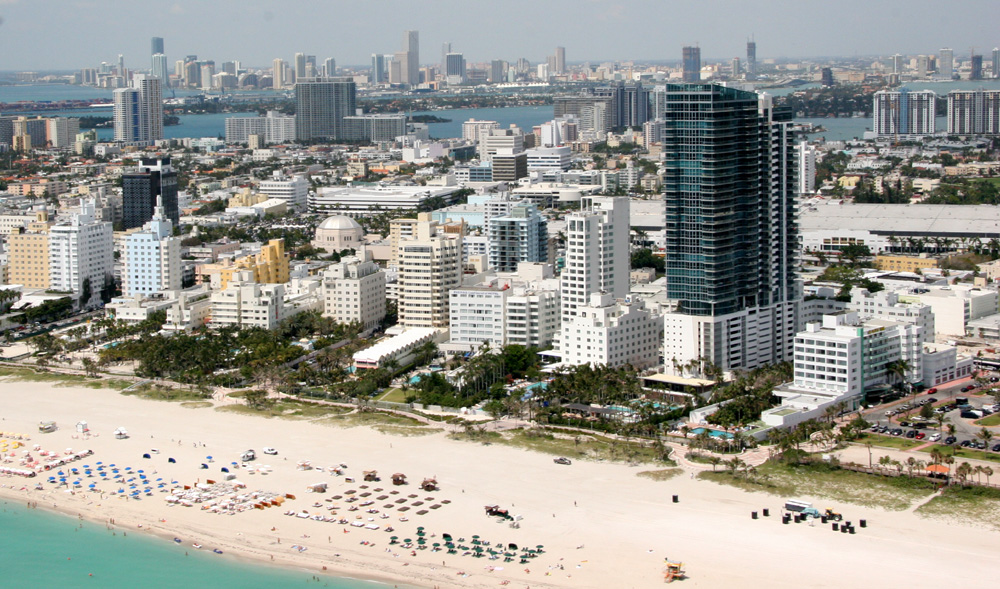
South Beach in April 2006

- South Beach
- Ocean Drive
- Calle Ocho
- Lincoln Road
- Downtown Miami
- Bal Harbour Shops
- Dolphin Mall
- Aventura Mall
- Biltmore Hotel
- Freedom Tower
- Miami Art Deco District
- Miami Design District
- Bayside Marketplace
- Little Havana
- Star Island
- Brickell
- City of Miami Cemetery
- Española Way
- Mary Brickell Village
- Wynwood Art District

=== Parks ===
- Tropical Park
- Amelia Earhart Park
- Bayfront Park
- The Barnacle Historic State Park
- Museum Park
- Crandon Park
- Bill Baggs Cape Florida State Park
- Oleta River State Park
- Everglades National Park
- Biscayne National Park

=== Sports venues ===
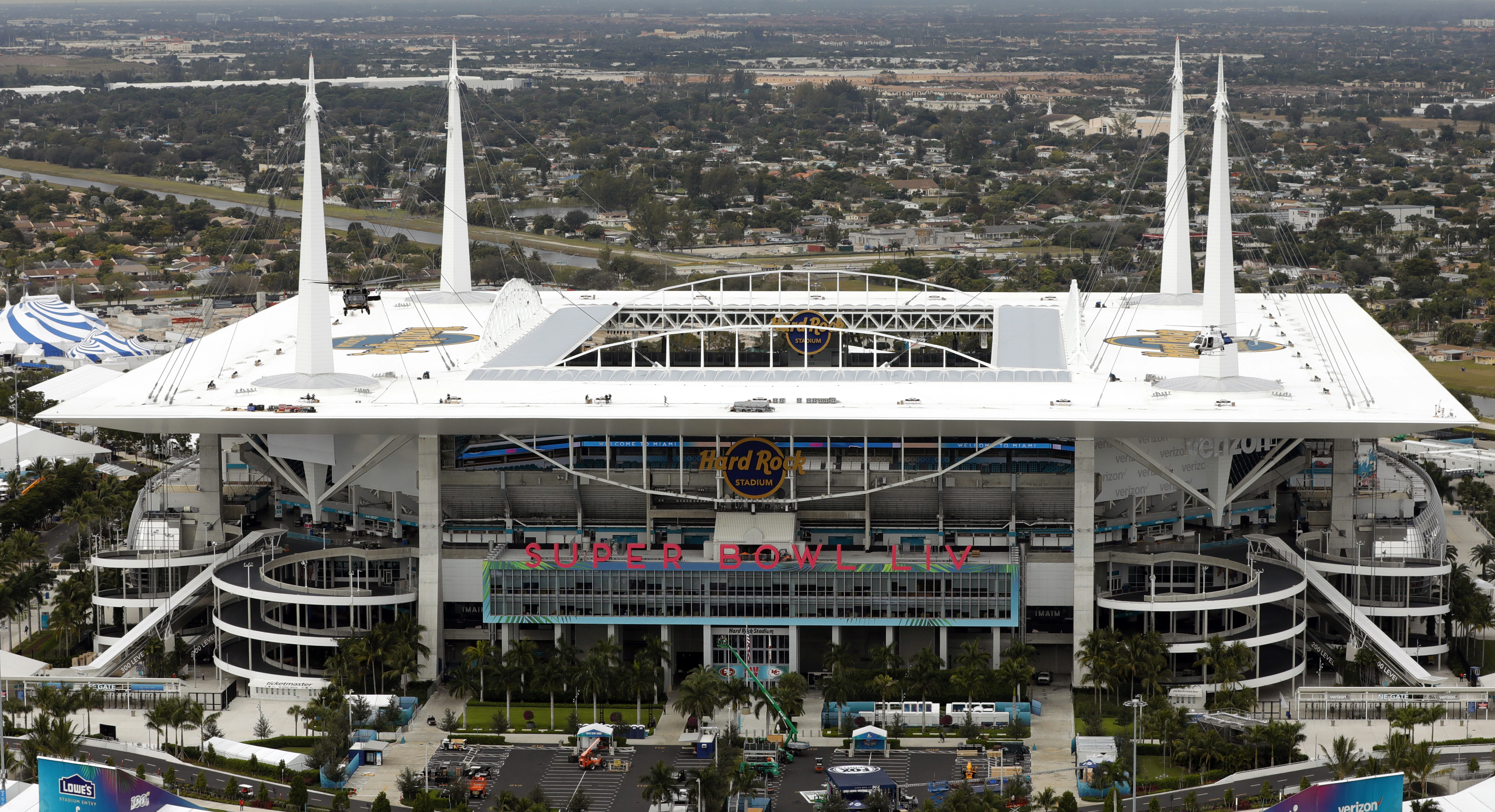
Hard Rock Stadium, home of the Miami Dolphins of the NFL and Miami Hurricanes of NCAA Division I college football, January 2020

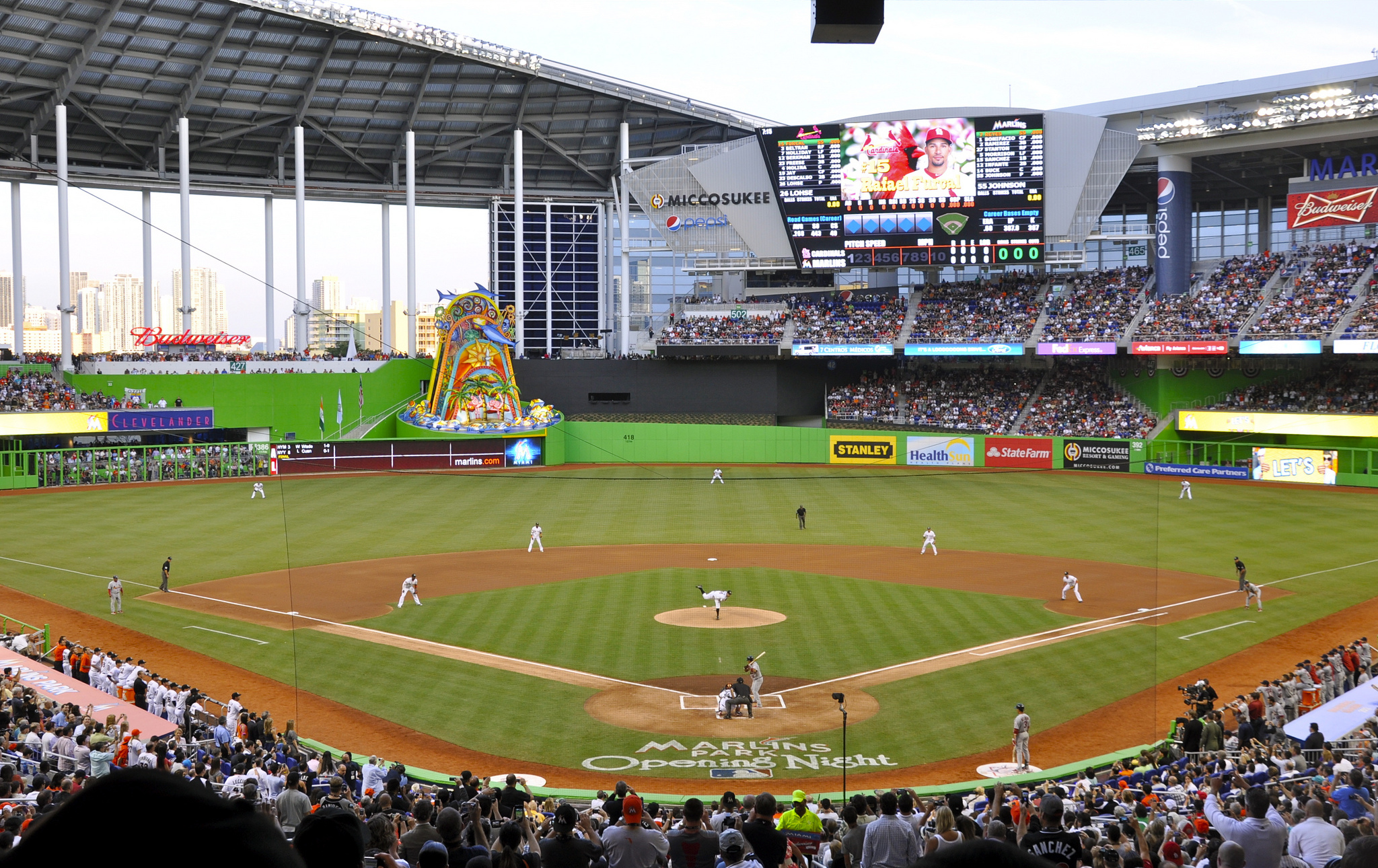
LoanDepot Park, home of the Miami Marlins, April 2012

Miami-Dade County holds the majority of sports arenas, stadiums and complexes in South Florida. Some of these sports facilities are:

- Hard Rock Stadium – Miami Dolphins (NFL football); Miami Hurricanes (NCAA college football); Miami Open (ATP tennis); Miami Grand Prix (Formula 1 auto racing)
- LoanDepot Park – Miami Marlins (MLB baseball)
- Kaseya Center – Miami Heat (NBA basketball)
- Nu Stadium - Inter Miami CF (MLS soccer)
- Tennis Center at Crandon Park – Former home of the Miami Open from 1987 until 2018
- Riccardo Silva Stadium – FIU Panthers (NCAA college football); Miami FC (USL soccer)
- Ocean Bank Convocation Center – FIU Panthers men's and women's (NCAA college basketball); FIU Panthers (NCAA volleyball)
- Infinity Insurance Park – FIU Panthers (NCAA college baseball)
- Watsco Center – Miami Hurricanes men's and women's (NCAA college basketball)
- Alex Rodriguez Park at Mark Light Field – Miami Hurricanes (NCAA college baseball)
- Cobb Stadium - Miami Hurricanes (NCAA soccer); Miami Hurricanes (NCAA track and field)
- Tropical Park Stadium
- Homestead-Miami Speedway - NASCAR auto racing; IndyCar auto racing; IMSA auto racing; CCS motorcycle racing
- Calder Race Course
- Hialeah Park Race Track

Former venues include:

- Bobby Maduro Miami Stadium
- Miami Arena - Former home of the Miami Heat and the Florida Panthers (NHL hockey)
- Miami Orange Bowl—Former home of the Miami Dolphins and the Miami Hurricanes (NCAA college football)
- Miami Marine Stadium
- Homestead Sports Complex
- Casino Miami - Formerly known as Miami Jai-Alai Fronton

== Transportation ==
=== Airports ===
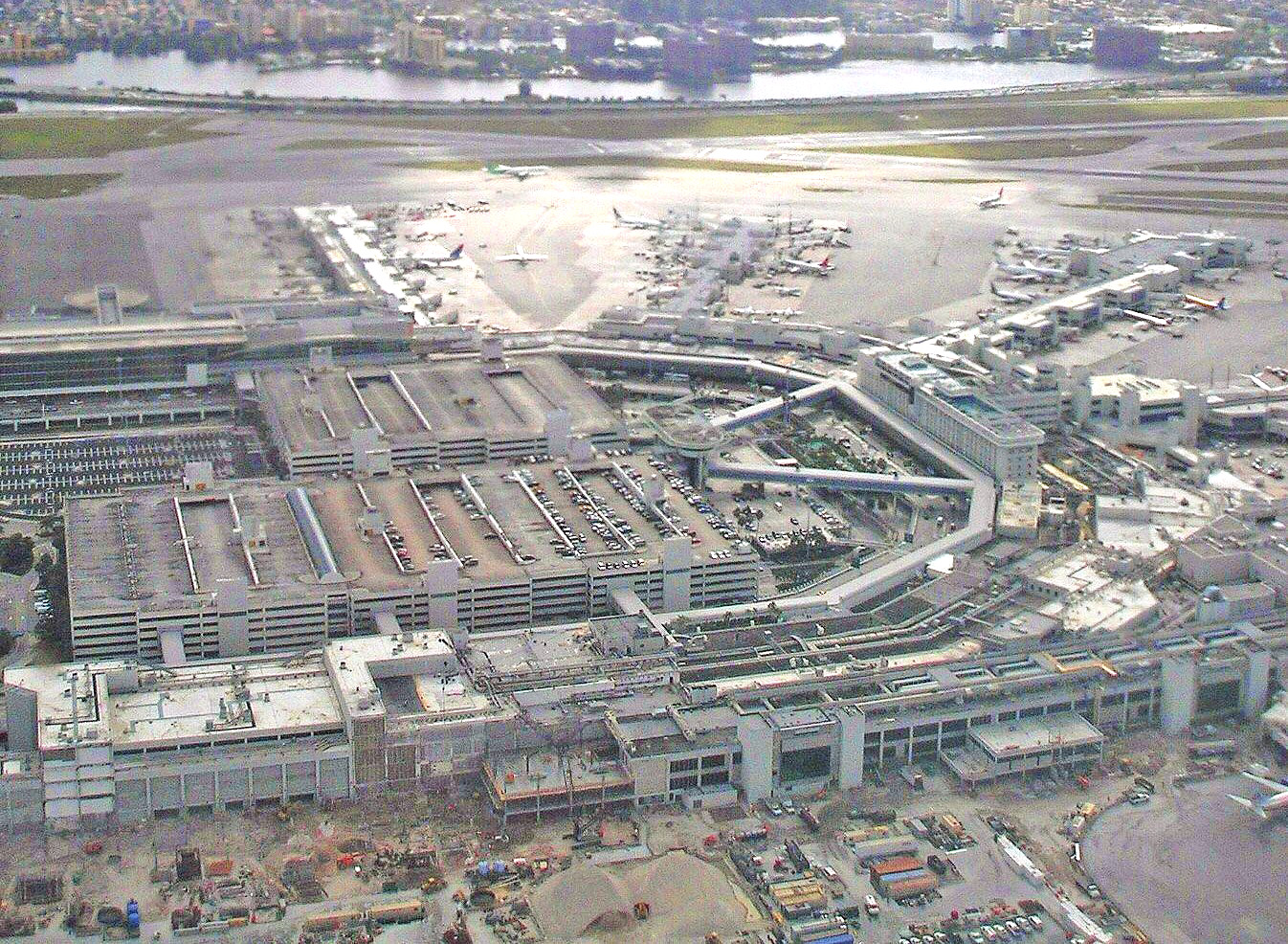
Miami International Airport

Miami International Airport (IATA: MIA, ICAO: KMIA, FAA LID: MIA), in an unincorporated area in central Miami-Dade County, is the Miami area's primary international airport. One of the busiest international airports in the world, it serves over 35 million passengers a year. The airport is a major hub and the single largest international gateway for American Airlines, the world's largest passenger air carrier. Miami International Airport is the United States' third largest international port of entry for foreign air passengers (behind New York's John F. Kennedy International Airport and Los Angeles International Airport), and is the seventh largest such gateway in the world. The airport's extensive international route network includes non-stop flights to over seventy international cities in North and South America, Europe, Asia, and the Middle East.

Other airports in Miami-Dade County include:

- Miami-Opa Locka Executive Airport (IATA: OPF, ICAO: KOPF, FAA LID: OPF), a joint civil-military airport in northwest Miami-Dade County
- Miami Seaplane Base (IATA: MPB, FAA LID: X44), a public-use seaplane base located just east of downtown Miami on Watson Island
- Miami Executive Airport (IATA: TMB, ICAO: KTMB, FAA LID: TMB), a public-use airport formerly known as Kendall-Tamiami Executive Airport, in southwest Miami-Dade County
- Homestead General Aviation Airport (FAA LID: X51), a public-use airport northwest of the City of Homestead in southern Miami-Dade County
- Homestead Air Reserve Base (IATA: HST, ICAO: KHST, FAA LID: HST), a military base east of the City of Homestead
- Dade-Collier Training and Transition Airport (IATA: TNT, ICAO: KTNT, FAA LID: TNT), a public-use airport located within the Florida Everglades in Collier County but owned by Miami-Dade County

=== Public transit ===
Public transit in Miami-Dade County is operated by Miami-Dade Transit (MDT), the largest public transit system in the state. MDT operates Metrorail, a heavy rail rapid transit system; Metromover, an elevated people mover servicing Downtown Miami, the Brickell financial district and the Arts & Entertainment District; and Metrobus, the county-wide bus system. MDT also runs the Paratransit division's Special Transportation Service.

Many county municipalities also operate local circulator trolleys within their municipal limits. These free trolleys are operated either independently by the municipality or in concert with MDT, and connect with the MDT network at various locations throughout their routes. Some examples of municipalities offering such services include Aventura, Coral Gables, Doral, Hialeah, Homestead, Miami, Miami Beach, Miami Gardens, North Miami Beach, and Sunny Isles Beach. Additionally, the Homestead trolley network includes seasonal service from the city to Biscayne National Park and Everglades National Park.

MDT also collaborates with Broward County Transit to provide overlapping and connecting bus service between Miami-Dade and Broward counties, and with Monroe County Transit to provide overlapping and connecting bus service between Miami-Dade County and the Florida Keys.

Miami-Dade County is also serviced by the Tri-Rail commuter rail service connecting locations in Miami-Dade, Broward and Palm Beach counties, and the Amtrak and Brightline intercity rail systems, all of which connect at various locations to Metrorail and other parts of the MDT network.

Companies providing intercity bus service in Miami-Dade County include FlixBus, Greyhound Lines and Megabus.

The Miami Intermodal Center (MIC) is an intermodal rapid transit, commuter rail, intercity rail, local bus, intercity bus and vehicle rental transportation hub just east of Miami International Airport and connected to the airport via an automated people mover. It connects the airport to all the other modes of public transportation available in the county.

=== Major expressways ===
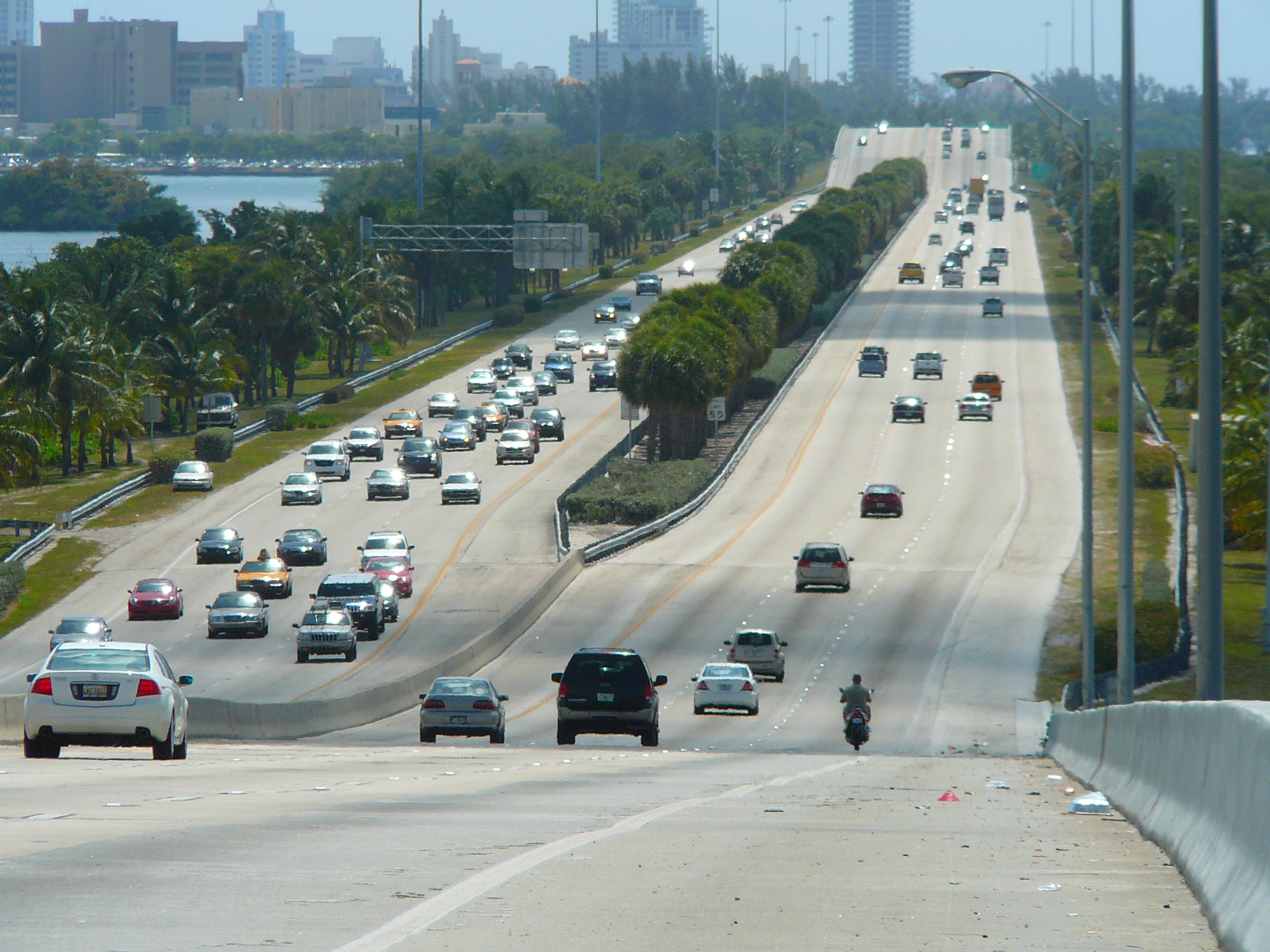
Julia Tuttle Causeway, which connects Miami with Miami Beach, May 2008

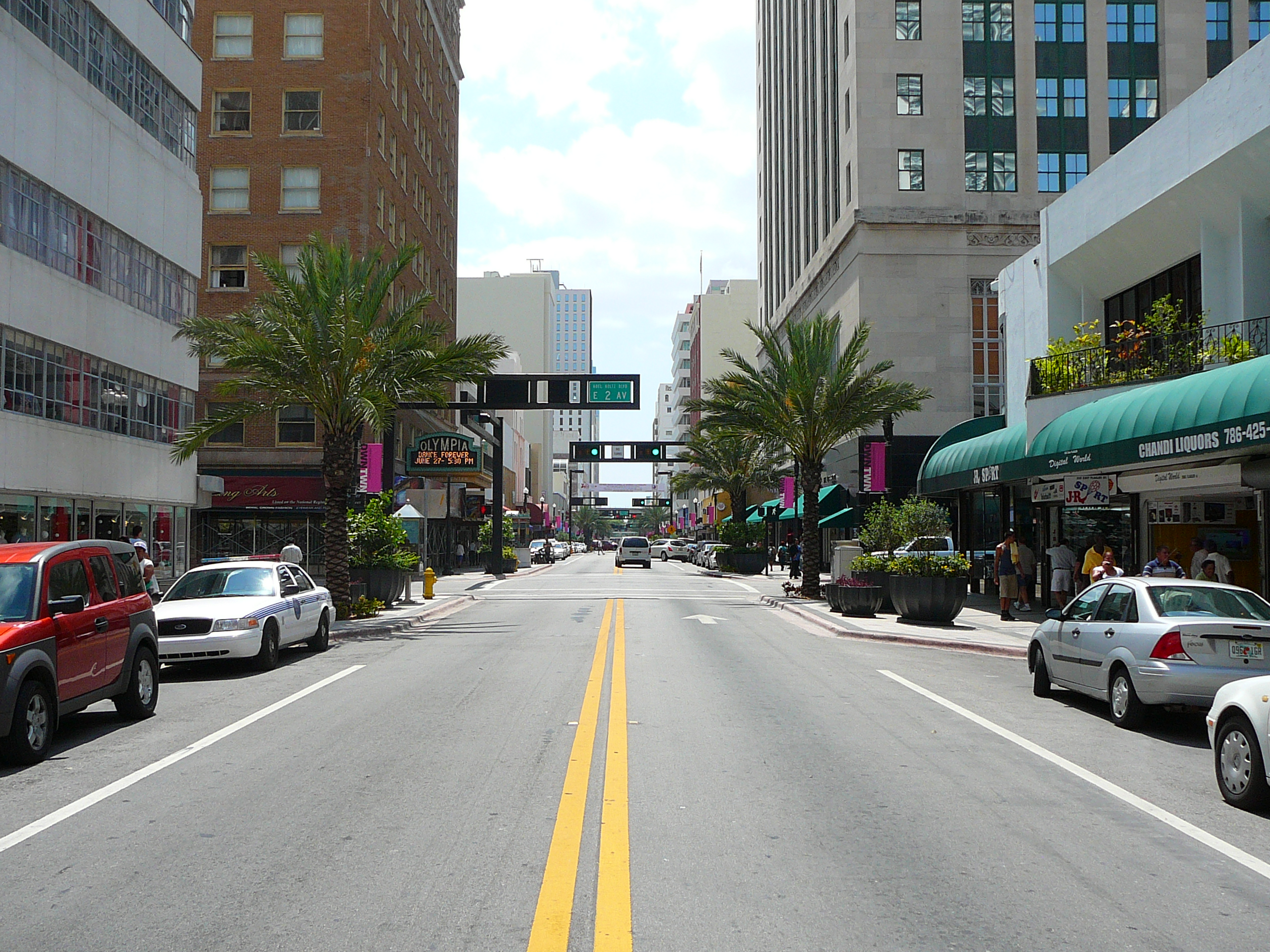
Flagler Street in Downtown Miami, May 2008

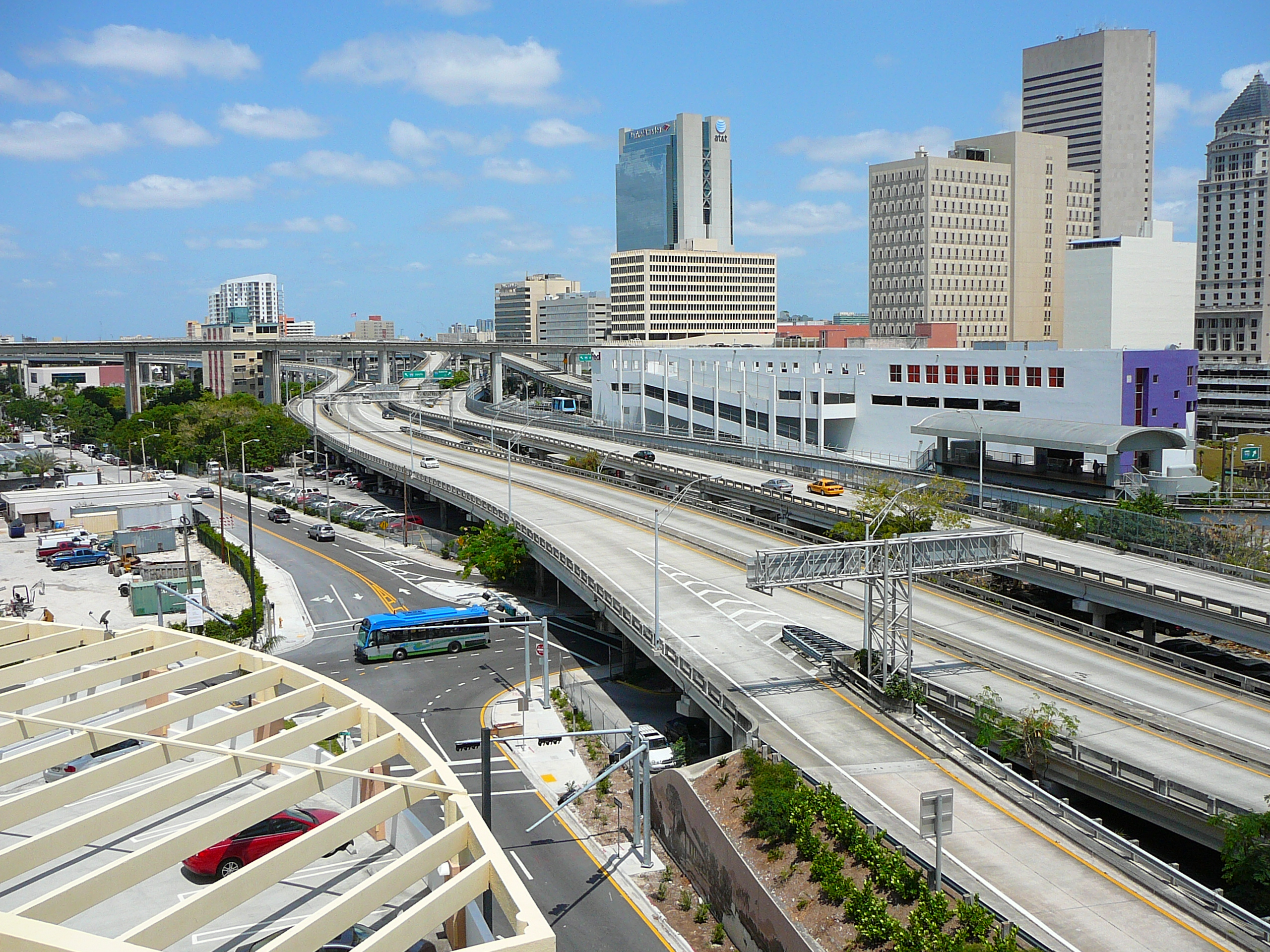
Florida State Road 970, also known as the Downtown Distributor, May 2008

Miami-Dade County has 10 major expressways and one minor expressway in Downtown Miami:

- I-75
- I-95
- I-195 / SR 112
- I-395 / SR 836
- US 1
- US 27
- US 41
- US 441
- SR A1A
- Florida's Turnpike
- Florida's Turnpike Extension
- SR 826
- SR 874
- SR 878
- SR 924

#	Road Name(s)	Direction and Termini					Notes
CR 854	Ives Dairy Road		SR 817		US 1		former SR 854 (east of US 441)
CR 905A	Card Sound Road		Monroe County line		US 1		former SR 905A signed on mile markers
CR 913	Crandon Boulevard / Rickenbacker Causeway						extension of SR 913
CR 948	Lindgren Road						extension of SR 825
CR 959	Southwest 57th Avenue						extension of SR 959
CR 973	Galloway Road						extension of SR 973
CR 992	Coral Reef Drive						extension of SR 992
CR 9823	Northwest 67th Avenue; Northwest 68th Avenue	N/S	SR 826	Palm Springs North	Broward County line	Palm Springs North	

Sources:

- FDOT Map of Miami-Dade County, Florida
- FDOT GIS data, accessed January 2014

-->

=== Street grid ===
A street grid stretches from downtown Miami throughout the county. This grid was adopted by the City of Miami following World War I after the United States Post Office threatened to cease mail deliveries in the city because the original system of named streets, with names often changing every few blocks and multiple streets in the city sharing the same name, was too confusing for the mail carriers. The new grid was later extended throughout the county as the population grew west, south, and north of city limits.

The grid is laid out with Miami Avenue as the meridian going north–south and Flagler Street the baseline going east–west. The grid is primarily numerical so that, for example, all street addresses north of Flagler and west of Miami Avenue have NW in their address (e.g. NW 27th Avenue). Because its point of origin is in downtown Miami which is close to the coast, the NW and SW quadrants are much larger than the SE and NE quadrants. Many roads, especially major ones, are also named, although, with a few notable exceptions, the number is in more common usage among locals.

Although this grid is easy to understand once one is oriented to it, it is not utilized in the entire county. Hialeah uses its own grid system which is entirely different in its orientation. Coral Gables and Miami Lakes use named streets almost exclusively, and various smaller municipalities such as Florida City and Homestead use their own grid system along with the Miami-Dade grid system adding to the confusion. In the beach cities and parks of Miami Beach, Surfside, Bal Harbour, Sunny Isles, and Golden Beach, the streets are coordinated with the main grid; however, their avenues are named.

== Sister cities ==
Miami-Dade County's sister cities are:

- Aix-Marseille-Provence, France
- Province of Asti, Italy
- Asunción, Paraguay
- The Bahamas
- Cape Town, South Africa
- (Republic of Ireland) County Cork, Ireland
- Curitiba, Brazil
- Dakar, Senegal
- Mancomunidad Gran Ciudad del Sur, Guatemala
- Iquique, Chile
- Kingston, Jamaica
- Madrid, Spain
- Maldonado, Uruguay
- Mendoza Province, Argentina
- Monagas State, Venezuela
- New Taipei, Taiwan
- Paramaribo, Suriname
- Pereira, Colombia
- Petit-Goâve, Haiti
- Prague, Czech Republic
- San José, Costa Rica
- San Pedro de Macorís, Dominican Republic
- Santa Cruz Department, Bolivia
- Santo Domingo, Dominican Republic
- São Paulo, Brazil
- Stockholm County, Sweden
- Tel Aviv, Israel
- Tenerife, Spain
- Veracruz, Mexico
- Viareggio, Italy

== See also ==
- Atlantic Sapphire
- Gentrification of Miami
- List of counties in Florida
- List of diplomatic missions in Miami
- List of tallest buildings in Miami
- List of tallest buildings in Miami Beach
- List of tallest buildings in Sunny Isles Beach
- National Register of Historic Places listings in Miami-Dade County, Florida
- West End (Florida)
