= Alan Greenberg (businessman) =

American businessman (born 1950)

Alan Greenberg (born November 6, 1950) has been a creator and operator of interactive and traditional media focused on the education, healthcare, and global travel service sectors. He was the President of Avenues: The World School and is the founder and CEO of immersive video/experience company Illuminarium Experiences.

== History and career ==
Greenberg graduated from the University of Tennessee Knoxville in 1972 from the College of Communications with a degree in advertising.

He went on to become the Vice President of Whittle Communication, where he launched publishing, interactive and broadcast properties.

In 1981, Greenberg took over as publisher of Esquire magazine, where he was responsible for the magazine's revenue economic turnaround between 1981 and 1986. Greenberg then founded Greenberg News Network, which created a medical education and healthcare news organization called Medcast, which was purchased by WebMD in 1999.

He established Travel Holdings as a global interactive travel distribution firm, which now does business in 13 languages and in over 100 countries. He was CEO of Travel Holdings until 2008. Business-to-business travel intermediary (or "bed bank") HotelBeds purchased Travel Holdings in 2017.

On March 11, 2010, Greenberg was honored with the University of Tennessee’s College of Communication and Information's (CCI) 2010 Donald G. Hileman Distinguished Alumni Award. It is awarded to college alumni who have made notable contributions to the field of communication and information.

In 2013, Greenberg founded Avenues: The Word School, an international system of for-profit private schools, with former president of Yale University Benno C. Schmidt, Jr. and education executive Chris Whittle. As of May 2021, the school has campuses in New York City, São Paulo, Brazil and Shenzhen, China, and also offers classes online.

In 2019, Greenberg founded immersive experience company Illuminarium Experiences, where he is CEO, with partners RadicalMedia, Rockwell Group and Legends Hospitality. The first Illuminarium opened in 2021 in Atlanta, Georgia (where the company is based), along the city's BeltLine, with a safari show entitled “WILD: A Safari Experience.” A Las Vegas, Nevada venue, at Area15, is planned for January 2022 and a Miami, Florida location for spring 2022. A theater is planned to open at Navy Pier in Chicago, Illinois in 2023.

== Personal life ==
Greenberg is married to Joy Greenberg. They have three children, Alison, Zachary and Aaron.
