= Avenues: The World School =

Private school in New York City

Avenues The World School
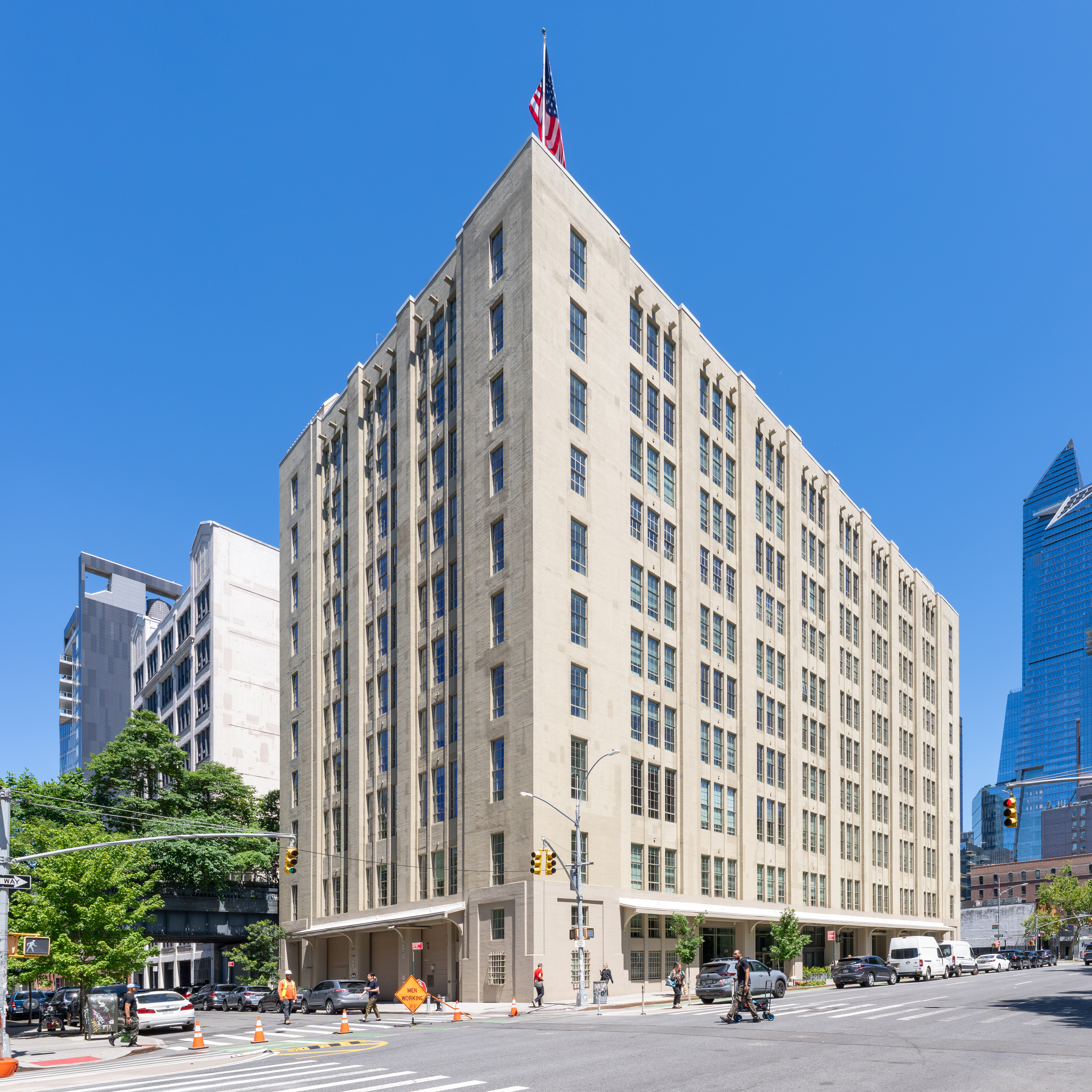
- The company's New York campus in 2026.

Location
- 40.74941°N 74.00327°W

Information
- Founder: Benno C. Schmidt, Jr., Chris Whittle, Alan Greenberg
- Website: avenues.org

Avenues The World School is an international system of for-profit private schools for toddler-12th grade. The first campus opened in September 2012 in New York City in the neighborhood of Chelsea. The second one opened in 2018 in Sao Paulo, Brazil in the Morumbi neighborhood.

== History ==
Avenues was founded by Benno C. Schmidt Jr., former president of Yale University; Chris Whittle, an entrepreneur in media and education who had previously founded Edison Schools; and Alan Greenberg, who had been publisher of Esquire. In 2015, Whittle left Avenues and later founded Whittle School & Studios.

Prior to opening its New York campus in 2012, the company raised $85 million. The New York campus opened after a $60-million renovation, led by Perkins Eastman Architects and Bonetti Kozerski Studio, of the R.C. Williams Warehouse, a building originally designed by Cass Gilbert in 1928. The school opened with 12 of its planned 15 grades for the 2012–2013 school year, including all grades between nursery and ninth grade. The 10th, 11th and 12th grades were added over the subsequent three years. Avenues' first graduating class was in spring 2016. The school was unusual among New York City private schools in offering a binding early admission option.

Avenues and several students from the school were heavily featured in the 2015 documentary film Class Divide, which explores the topic of gentrification.

In October 2023, Avenues New York and Avenues São Paulo were acquired by Nord Anglia. Plans to open an additional campus in Miami were canceled in March 2024. As of 2023, the newest school in Silicon Valley is occupying temporary space at Mission College in Santa Clara until its newly designed campus opens in San Jose.

== Notable Alumnae ==
- King Princess

== Campuses ==
Campus	Opening Date	Enrollment	CEEB code
New York City	2012	1753	333776
São Paulo	2018	1170	910058
Shenzhen	2019		002403
Online Program		≥1	330098
Silicon Valley	2022	70	910794

== See also ==
- Education in New York City
- List of high schools in New York City
- American international schools in Brazil
