= Intelsat headquarters =

3400 International Drive
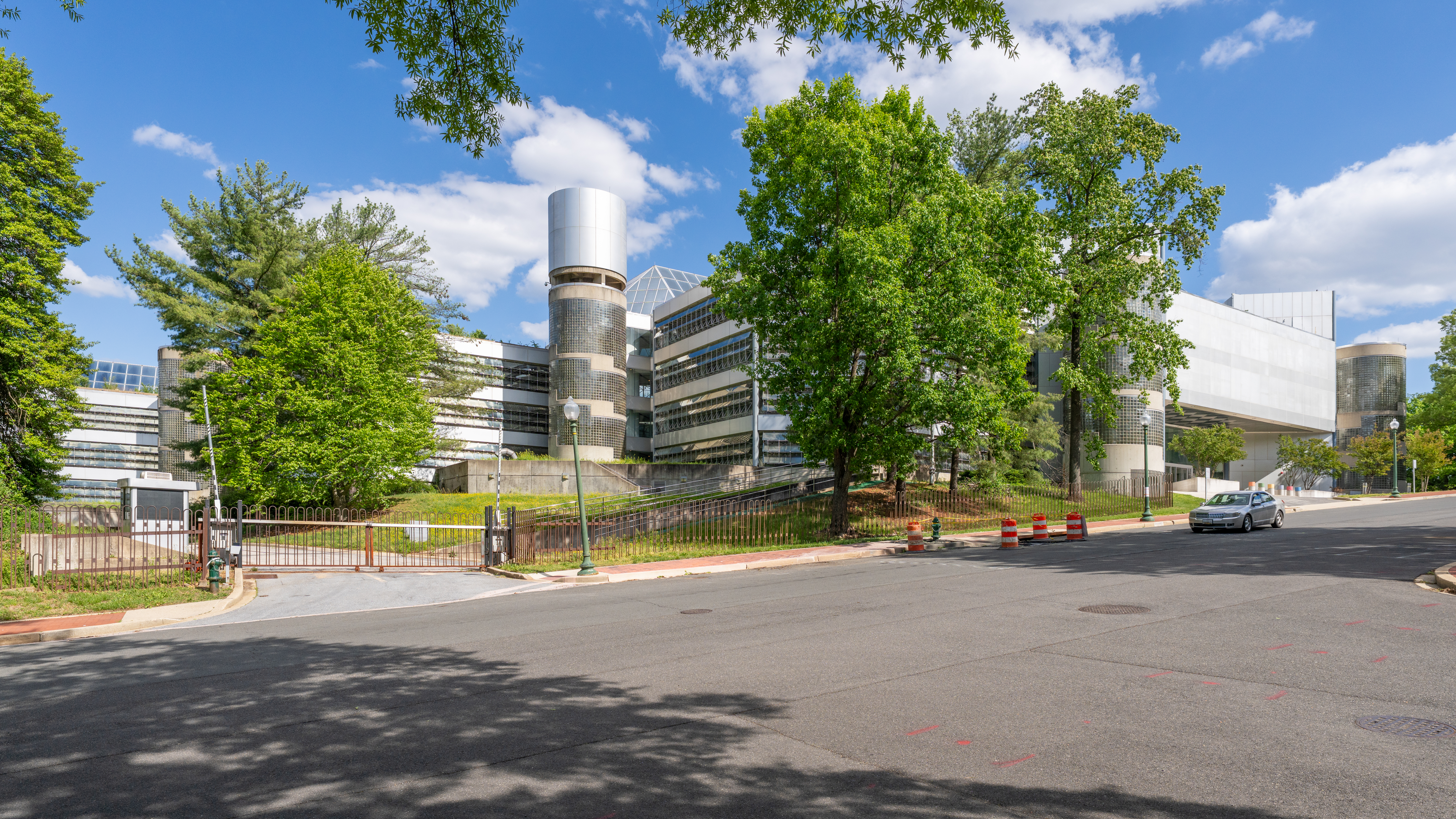
- As seen from International Drive (2026)
- Interactive map of the 3400 International Drive area
- Alternative names: Intelsat Headquarters

General information
- Type: Corporate headquarters
- Architectural style: High-tech
- Location: 3400 International Drive, NW, Washington
- Coordinates: 38.9425°N 77.063333°W
- Current tenants: Intelsat
- Groundbreaking: July 20, 1982
- Completed: 1984, 1988

Dimensions
- Other dimensions: 14 pods

Technical details
- Floor count: 7
- Floor area: 917,000 sq ft (85,200 m^{2})

Design and construction
- Architect: John Andrews
- Architecture firm: John Andrews International and Notter Finegold & Alexander
- Civil engineer: Richard Strong

3400 International Drive (also known as Intelsat Headquarters) is an office complex in the North Cleveland Park neighborhood of Washington, D.C., by the Van Ness metro station. Known for its futuristic and high-tech architecture, it was designed by the Australian architect John Andrews and built by Gilbane Building Company as the U.S. headquarters of the International Telecommunications Satellite Organization (Intelsat). It opened in two phases, in 1984 and 1988.

Intelsat occupied the building until 2014, when the organization moved its national headquarters to Tysons, Virginia. In April 2019, the building was designated as a landmark in the DC Inventory of Historic Sites by the Historic Preservation Review Board. From 2019 to 2022, the building has housed the D.C. location of Whittle School & Studios, a private, for-profit "global school" that served students ages 3–18.

== Background ==
The International Telecommunications Satellite Organization (INTELSAT), founded in 1964 to ensure that satellite communications capabilities were equally available to all countries, was initially headquartered in a cramped leased space at L’Enfant Plaza.

The organization began seeking a new Washington, D.C., headquarters in 1977. Ultimately, they held a competition through the International Union of Architects to design a new energy-efficient building in which at least 70% of the office space had natural light and a view of the outside. The 1979 competition drew bids from nearly 100 firms from 23 countries.

== Structure ==
The design competition and contract were won by Australian architect John Andrews. His design for the Intelsat Headquarters includes elements from his previous Callam Offices complex in Canberra, Australia, which was constructed between 1977 and 1981, and features octagonal office "pods" as well as circulation towers and walkways.

Ground was broken on the project on July 20, 1982, in a rather unusual manner. Using a network of four satellites and five earth stations, a signal was radioed around the world two times before it triggered a pre-set explosion at the building site. The complex was built in two phases: Phase I was completed in 1984, Phase II in 1988.

Intelsat's director general and deputy embezzled $5 million during design and construction.

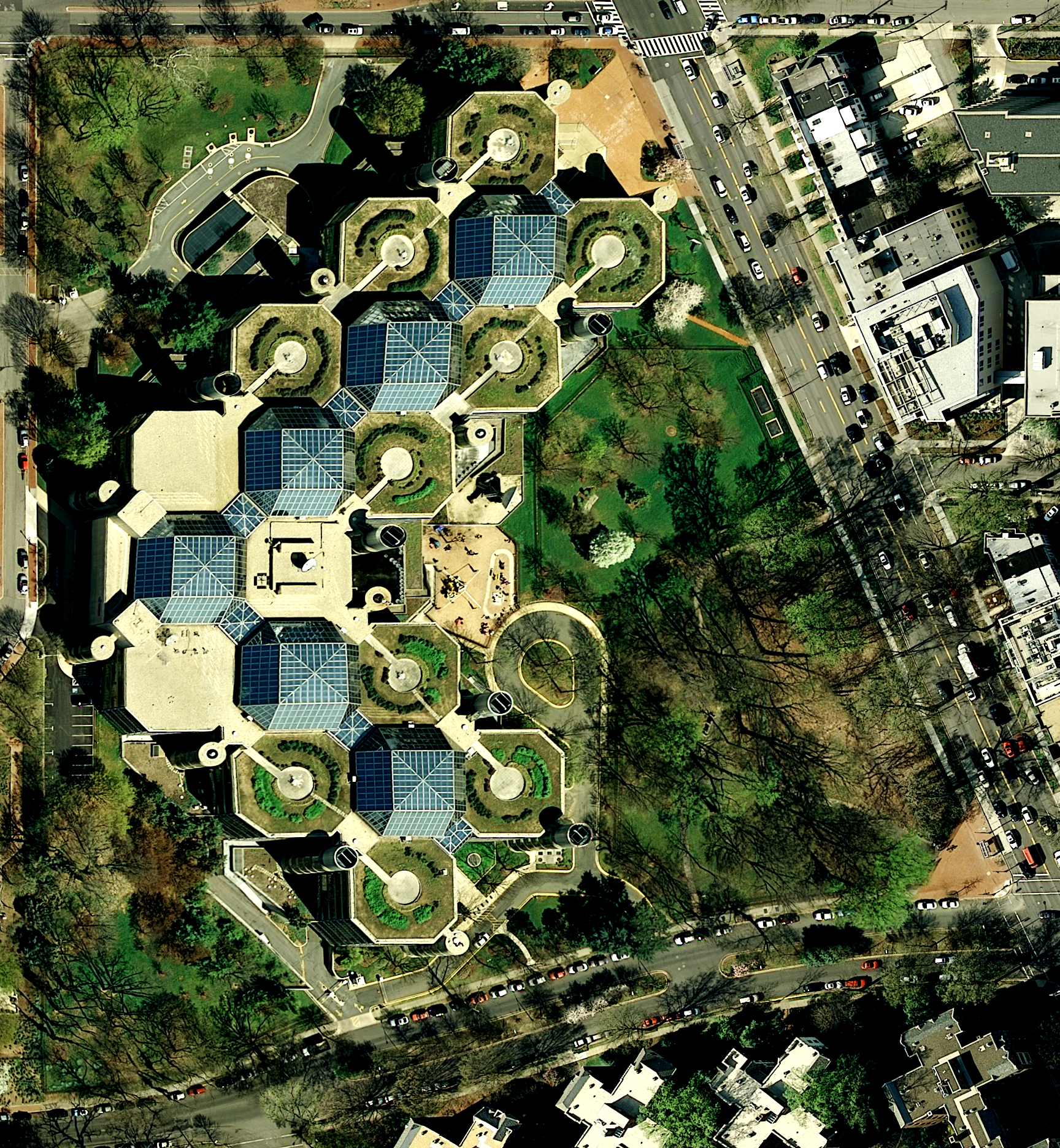
Aerial view of the complex

The complex consists of 14 interconnected "pods" clustered in groups of four around taller glass and stainless steel atria. The circular stairwells external to the pods are constructed of glass bricks and concrete.

Unusual for the time, but in line with the nascent environmental aesthetic, the design incorporated energy efficiency such as the use of tinted-glass sunscreens and the open-air atria that admit sunlight while reflecting direct sun. Also, the complex incorporates interior and exterior water features for cooling and terraced roof gardens to complement the large trees preserved by the site plan. Intelsat's design, one of the first “green buildings” in Washington, D.C., became an important model for environmentally conscious and energy saving architecture.

While the building is 917,000 square feet (85,200 m^{2}), only 546,000 sq ft (50,700 m^{2}) is usable office space, with the remainder being taken up by the lengthy corridor down the center of the building, the atria, and other public spaces.

Intelsat was the initial occupant, but after its privatization in 1999 and its later mergers with PanAmSat, COMSAT and parts of Loral, its continued presence at the site became uncertain. Intelsat moved from the complex in 2014, and relocated in Tysons, Virginia. Other occupants have included the embassies of Belize, Botswana, Cameroon, Eswatini, Honduras, and Monaco as well as WJLA Channel 7.

== Reception ==
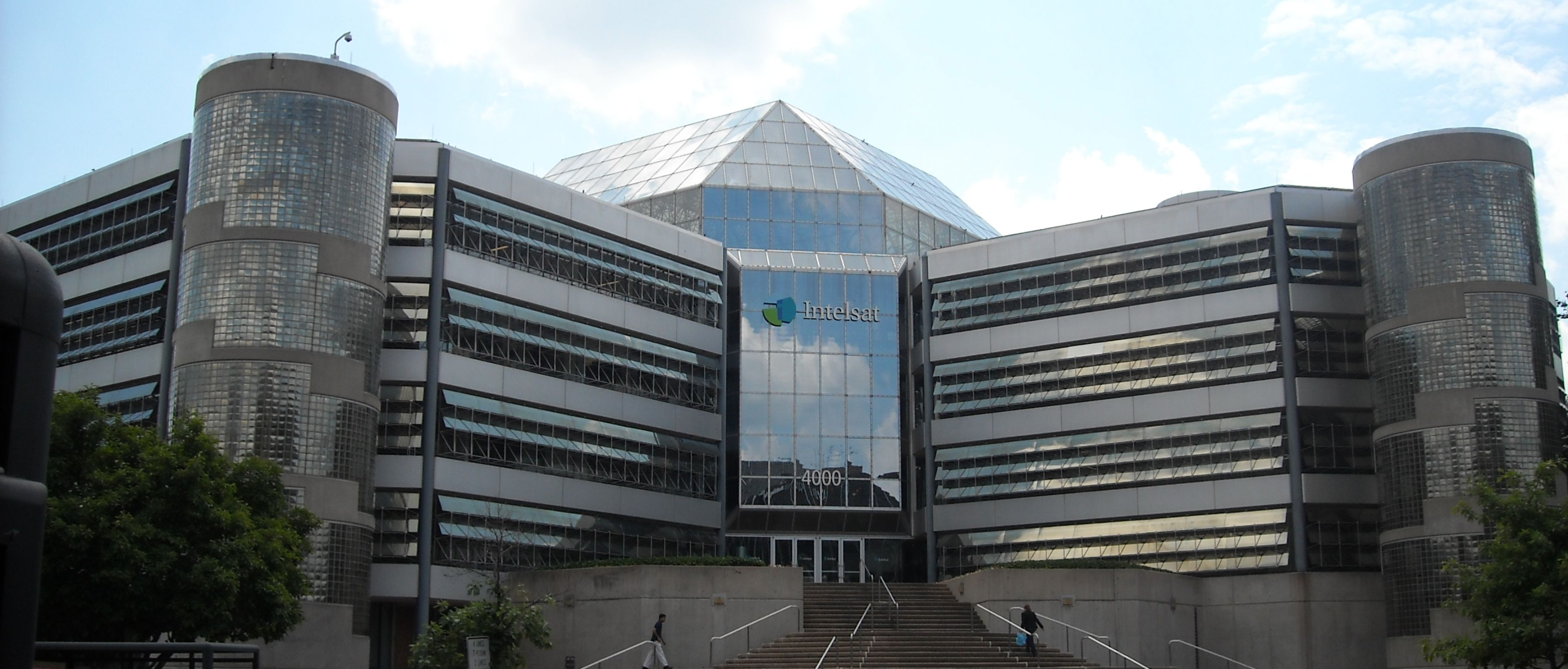
The Connecticut Avenue entrance

Andrews said his design expressed "a spirit of openness, of optimism, of faith in cooperation between peoples and groups of people, and the use of modern technology." However, since its construction, reception has been mixed. Some consider it "a Connecticut Avenue landmark and a must-see for futurists touring the nation's capital" because of its unique high-tech design and energy efficiency. Early in its existence, it was noted as being a positive repudiation of architectural conservatism, however, its style was not duplicated and therefore it stands out from the surrounding city.

Other critics also note that it does not interact well with the surrounding buildings and add that it can be difficult for visitors to find the entrance. As of 2005 it had been studied by the Historic Preservation Section of the D.C. Office of Planning as a potential landmark of Modern architecture, but a 2011 architectural-historical review of the area as part of the University of the District of Columbia's student center construction planning found that Intelsat was not old enough for landmark status and was a "visual shock" to the neighborhood, given its arguably inappropriate design and sitting for an urban area. The review did indicate that this opinion could change as the building aged further.

In January 2017 the Intelsat Headquarters was nominated for historic designation by the DC Preservation League (DCPL). The Intelsat Headquarters building was nominated under DC Criterion A for important historical events, because of its associated with telecommunication achievements. It also falls under Criterion B for history because it served as Intelsat's home. Due to its historical significance, it is also eligible under the National Register Criterion A for history. The building was also nominated under the District of Columbia Criterion D and the National Register Criterion C for its architecture. In addition to that, it was nominated under DC Criterion F as the work of a master architect. John Andrews' work has been recognized internationally and has had other buildings designated as historic sites.
