= Bridgescape =

Coordinates: 26.1224°N 80.1431°W

Bridgescape, formerly known as EdisonLearning, is an operator of alternative schools, sometimes referred to as dropout recovery schools, in the U.S. According to a ProPublica report, by 2013, Bridgescape operated 17 schools in six states including "options" schools in Chicago, Illinois.

Bridgescape cut or left unfilled 40% of its staff positions in 2018. These were positions as career counsellors, teachers, social workers and college counsellors. It has spent $1200 of every $8000 budgeted per student on its software, yet it has been criticized for its reliance on online learning. A 2017 review of the Bridgescape-run Madison Alternative Center questioned whether students learned standards through the online model. Bridgescape has also been criticized for collecting money to teach students who rarely attend its schools.

Magic Johnson was involved in marketing Bridgescape schools.
