= Honduras–United States relations =

- Honduras: United States

Diplomatic mission
- Embassy of Honduras, Washington, D.C.: Embassy of the United States, Tegucigalpa

Honduras and the United States have had formal relations since 1830. There is close cooperation between the two countries, particularly in the areas of the war on drugs while the National Port Authority in Puerto Cortés is part of the U.S. Bureau of Customs and Border Protection's Container Security Initiative.

== History ==
=== Colonial era ===
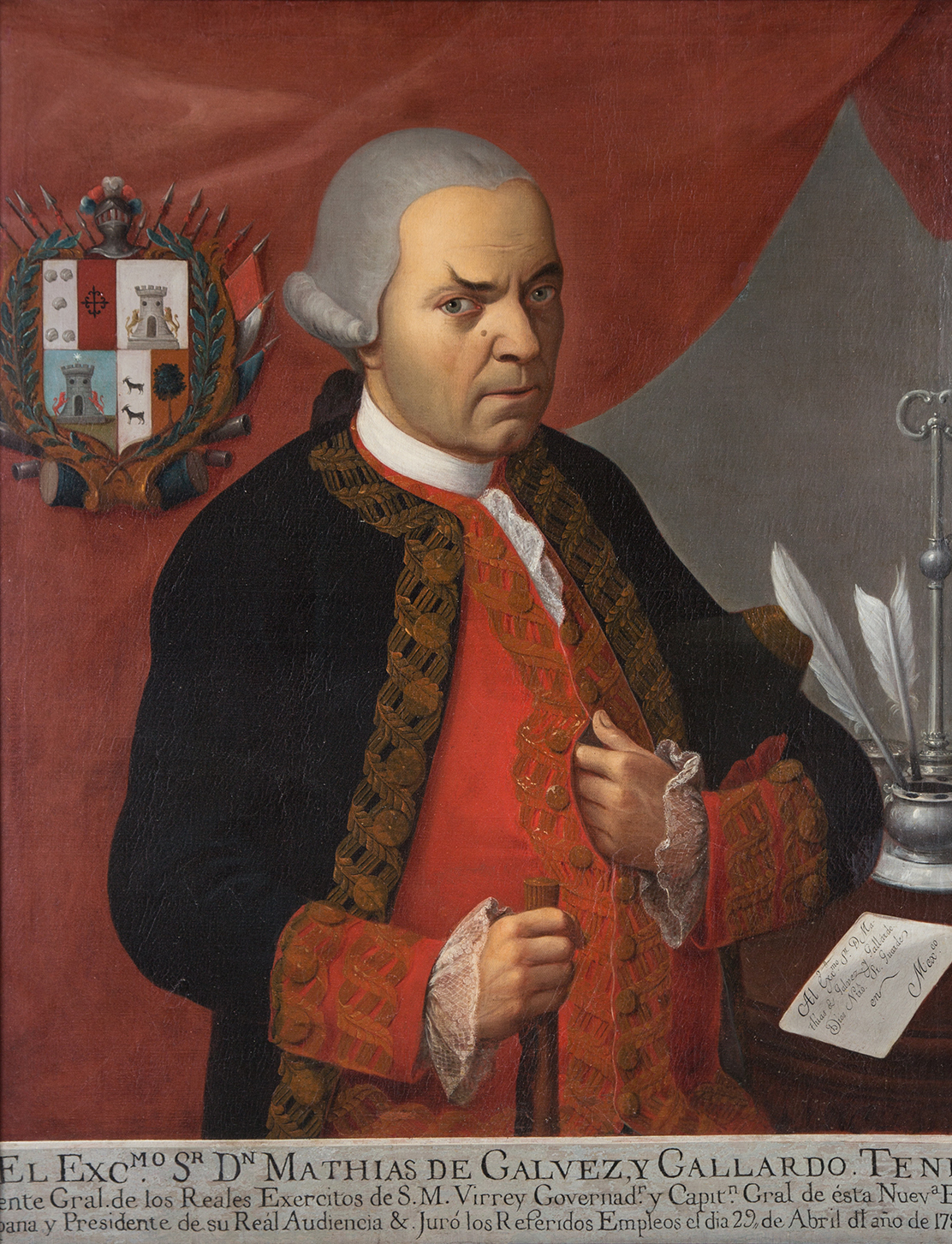
The viceroy of New Spain Matías de Gálvez y Gallardo, who recognized and supported the independence of the United States, fought in Honduras on the Bay Islands against the British presence in the region.

During the colonial period, the region that would become today's republic of Honduras and the Thirteen Colonies of North America and later the United States had limited interactions due to distance, political barriers, and Spanish colonial domination in Central America. However, there are some indirect antecedents that marked the early relations between what would eventually become the United States and the Honduran territory. Such as merchandise smuggling, geostrategic interests of the English crown in the Mosquitocoast and the Bay Islands, and the influence of the independence of America among the Criollos and the enlightened Hispanic elite.

=== 19th century ===
The establishment of formal relations began in 1830 when the Central American government opened diplomatic and commercial relations with the United States and the American embassy was opened on Central American soil. After the end of the Federation and the independence of Honduras from this in 1838, the country and the United States continued to maintain an open diplomatic relationship. Honduras, given its strategic geographic location and its wealth in natural resources, began to attract American interest although its influence on the country was not as strong as it was several decades later.

The first disagreement between Honduras and the United States occurred in 1848 when President Juan Lindo showed serious concern about the annexation of Mexican territory by the United States after the Mexican American War. after this disagreement the relationship between the United States and Honduras will continue normally. In 1849 the United States supported Hondurans in the Anglo-Honduran War, as this aid would give Honduras a diplomatic victory over the British Empire. During this period, the diplomat E.G Squier arrived, who brought descriptions about the country to the University of New York and who saw several archaeological sites and interviewed indigenous peoples in the area.

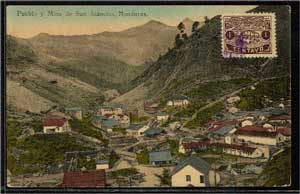
San Juancito, home of the Rosario Mining Company, once held the American consulate.

During the end of this century when we began to see the growth of US capital investment on Honduran soil, opening companies such as the Rosario Minning Company, this due to the so-called Liberal Reform made by President Marco Aurelio Soto that allowed foreign investment.

=== 20th century ===
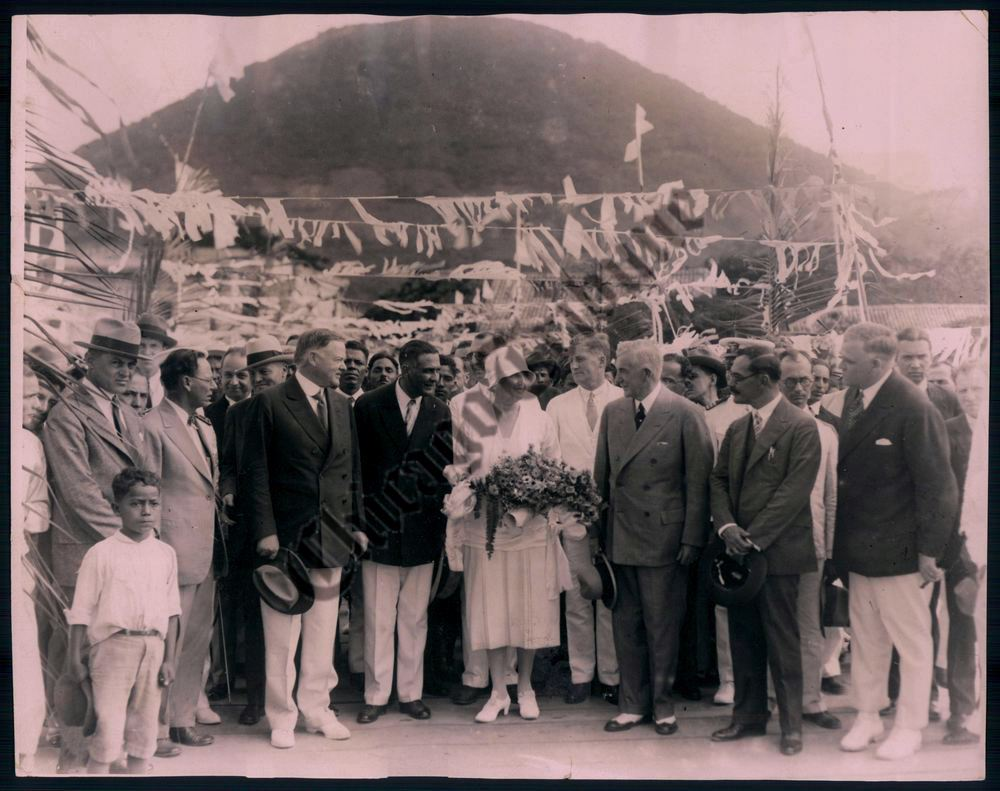
President Herbert Hoover in Amapala, during his visit to Honduras.

Between the early 1900s to the mid 1950s, American companies such as the United Fruit Company and the Standard Fruit Company dominated the Honduran economy. The power of these companies became so great that they influenced government decisions and even changes in political leadership in Honduras. This period is known as the rise of the “Banana Republics,” a term that refers to the economic and political dependence of these countries on the United States due to the banana industry.

During this period also saw the involvement of Honduras in both world wars. During the first, Honduras would be the last country to declare war on the German Empire, very late in 1918 just a few months until the end of the war. For the Second World War, it would become more deeply involved in supporting the allies. Although at the beginning, at the initiative of President Tiburcio Carias Andino, he maintained a certain diplomatic closeness with the Axis, however he slowly distanced himself from them until after the Pearl Harbor attacks, he declared war on the Empire of Japan, Germany, and Italy.

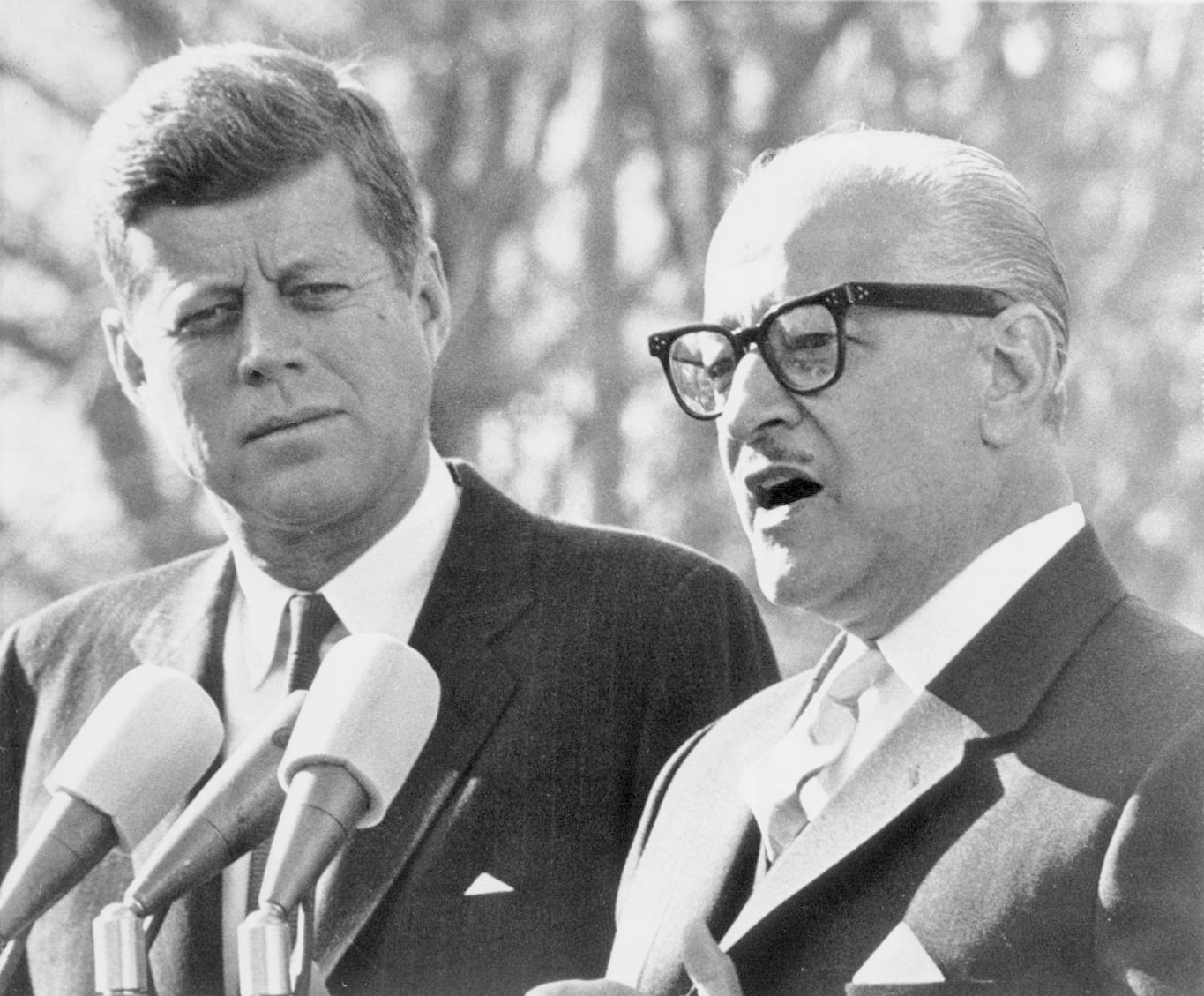
John F. Kenedy and Ramon Villeda Morales.

Starting in the 60s, Ramon Villeda Morales became president, who maintained close ties with the administration of John F. Kennedy, with the United States being the investor in humanitarian projects in the country. However, Villeda Morales' administration would end abruptly with a coup d'état. During the rest of the century, Honduras always remained under the influence of the United States in the context of the Cold War. Through the next years of the decade and the 70s Honduras suffered military junta governments which continued to maintain closeness with the United States as its main ally.

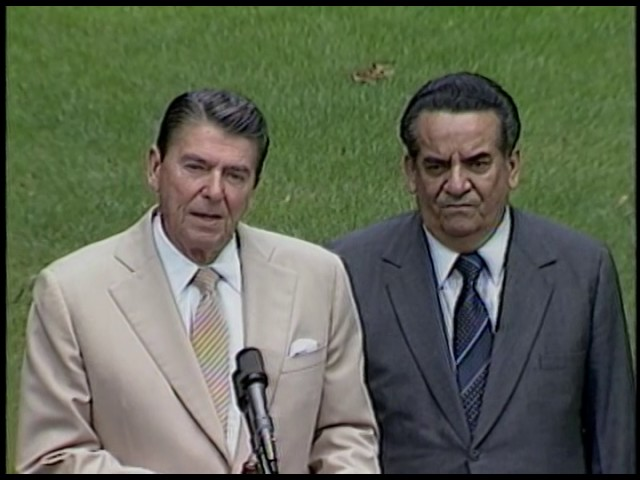
President Ronald Reagan and Roberto Suazo Córdova at the White House after discussing the role of Honduras against Soviet influence in Central America.

On November 22, 1971, the United States handed over the Swan Islands to Honduras after signing the Treaty of the Swan Islands. Honduras began exercising this sovereignty on September 1, 1972.

During the 1980s, Honduras supported U.S. policy opposing governments in Nicaragua and opposing an active insurgency in El Salvador. Honduras would become a bastion against communism on Central American soil and a key for the Reagan administration to fight against Soviet influence in the region, to the extent that this country would support the Contras to fight with the Sandinistas.

=== 21st century ===
In June 2005, Honduras became the first country in the hemisphere to sign a Millennium Challenge Account (MCA) compact with the US Government. Honduras failed the corruption indicator required for continued funding into 2008. MCC will closely follow Honduras's progress on reducing corruption under an approved "remediation plan."

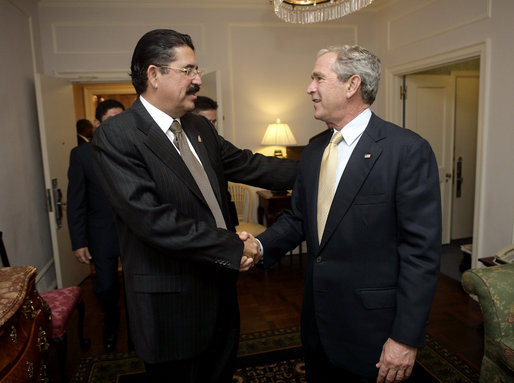
Former president Manuel Zelaya and George W. Bush.

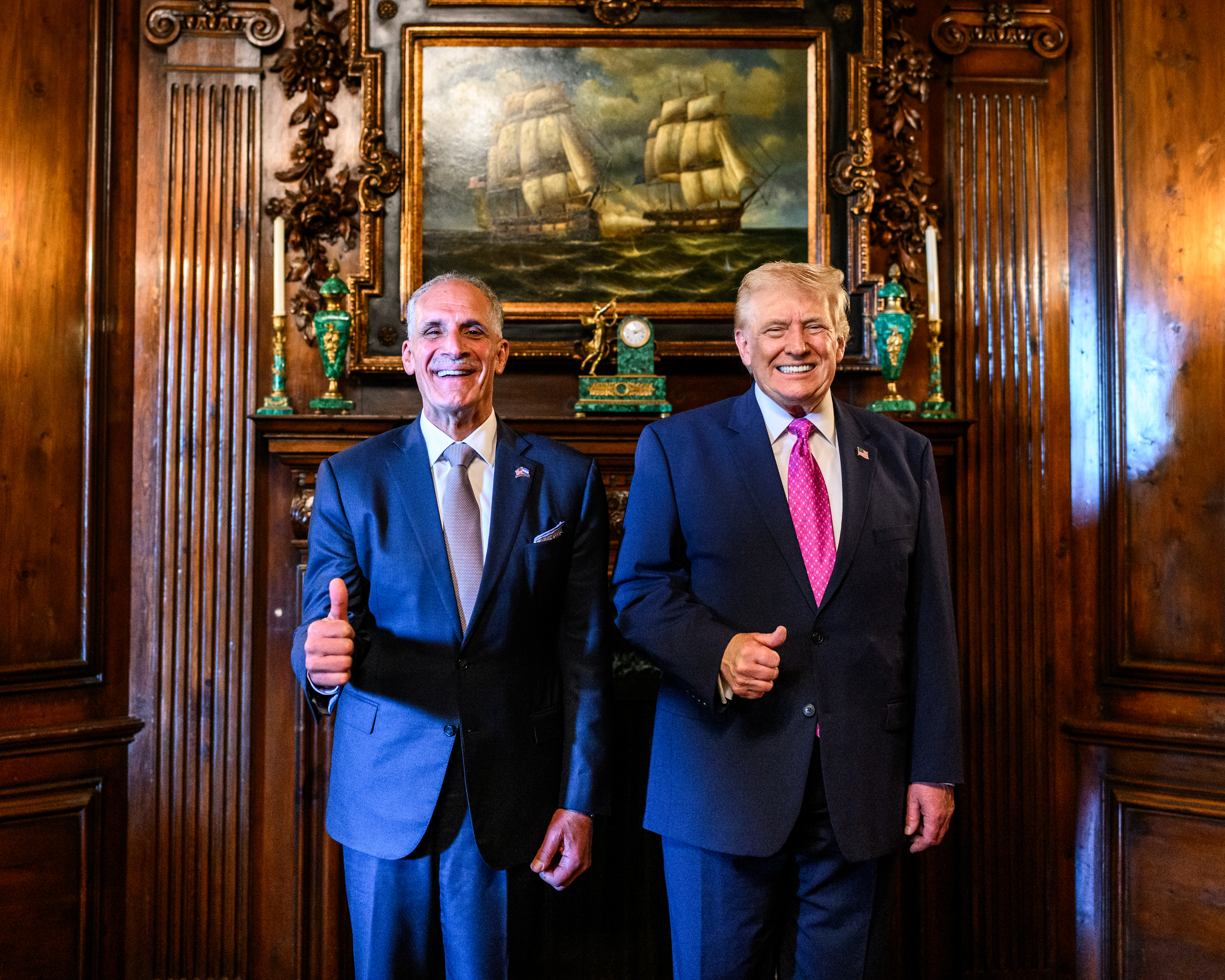
Honduran president Nasry Asfura with US president Donald Trump in February 2026

The United States recognized President Manuel Zelaya, ousted from power in the 2009 Honduran coup d'état, as the only constitutional president of Honduras. "We believe that the coup was not legal and that President Zelaya remains the democratically elected president there," US President Barack Obama said. Although U.S. officials have characterized the events as a coup, suspended joint military operations and all non-emergency, non-immigrant visas, and cut off certain non-humanitarian aid to Honduras, they have held back from formally designating Zelaya's ouster as a "military coup", which would require them to cut off almost all aid to Honduras.

The United States subsequently warned the Micheletti government that it might not recognize the results of the November 29, 2009 elections if Zelaya was not allowed to return to power first, and ultimately indicated that the November election would not be recognized, persuading the Micheletti regime to refer Zelaya's return to the Honduran Congress.

The United States maintains a presence at the Soto Cano Air Base in Comayagua; the two countries conduct joint peacekeeping, counter-narcotics, humanitarian, disaster relief, and civic action exercises. U.S. troops conduct and provide logistics support for a variety of bilateral and multilateral exercises, medical, engineering, peacekeeping, counternarcotics, and disaster relief.

In early 2025, Honduras threatened to expel U.S. troops if President-elect Donald Trump pursued a mass deportation of refugees and asylum seekers entering the United States from Central America.

In 2025, US President Donald Trump is trying to influence the 2025 Honduran general election by favoring Nasry Asfura (National Party), whom he publicly supports, and has warned that US aid could be suspended if his preferred candidate does not win. He has also promised to pardon former President Juan Orlando Hernández—a member of the National Party—who was serving a 45-year prison sentence in the United States for drug trafficking.

In 2026, the new Honduran government of president Nasry Asfura has maintained a very close relationship with the United States. In July 2026, former president Juan Orlando Hernandez, pardoned by Trump, returned to Honduras from the United States.

== Trade ==
In 2004, the United States signed the U.S.-Central America Free Trade Agreement (CAFTA) with Honduras, El Salvador, Nicaragua, Guatemala, Costa Rica, and the Dominican Republic. The legislatures of all signatories except Costa Rica ratified CAFTA in 2005, and the agreement entered into force in the first half of 2006. CAFTA eliminates tariffs and other barriers to trade in goods, services, agricultural products, and investments. Additionally, CAFTA is expected to solidify democracy, encourage greater regional integration, and provide safeguards for environmental protection and labor rights.

Bilateral trade between the two nations totaled $7.4 billion in 2006, up from $7 billion in 2005. Exports of goods and services from the U.S. increased from $3.24 billion in 2005 to $3.69 billion in 2006, while Honduran exports to the U.S. fell slightly from $3.75 billion in 2005 to $3.72 billion in 2006 More than 150 American companies operate in Honduras; U.S. franchises are present in increasing numbers. U.S.-Honduran trade is dominated by the Honduran maquila (factory) industry, which imports yarn and textiles from the United States and exports finished articles of clothing. Other leading Honduran exports to the United States include coffee, bananas, seafood (particularly shrimp), minerals (including zinc, lead, gold, and silver), and other fruits and vegetables. Two-way trade with Honduras in 2006 was $7.4 billion, up from $7.0 billion in 2005. For 2007 through October, Honduran exports to the United States increased 6%, and U.S. exports to Honduras increased 18% when compared to the same period in 2006.

U.S. investors account for nearly two-thirds of the foreign direct investment (FDI) in Honduras. The stock of U.S. direct investment in Honduras in 2005 was $402 million, up from $339 million in 2004. The overall flow of FDI into Honduras in 2005 totaled $568 million, $196 million of which was spent in the maquila sector. The United States continued as the largest contributor of FDI. The most substantial U.S. investments in Honduras are in the maquila sector, fruit production (particularly bananas, melons, and pineapple), tourism, energy generation, shrimp aquaculture, animal feed production, telecommunications, fuel distribution, cigar manufacturing, insurance, brewing, leasing, food processing, and furniture manufacturing. Many U.S. franchises, particularly in the restaurant sector, operate in Honduras.

As of 2023, an economic relations remain a key aspect of the U.S.-Honduras relationship. Honduras presents several attractive features for international and domestic investors, such as its proximity to U.S. markets and the benefits provided by the Dominican Republic-Central American Free Trade Agreement (CAFTA-DR). However, investors face challenges including security concerns, corruption, and inadequate rule of law. The International Monetary Fund (IMF) identified a GDP growth of 4 percent in 2022 for Honduras, with a forecasted growth of 3.7 percent by the end of 2023.

== Assistance ==
The USAID budget for Honduras is $37 million for fiscal year 2007. Hurricane Mitch in 1998 left hundreds of thousands homeless, devastated the road network and other public infrastructure, and crippled certain key sectors of the economy, causing more than $3 billion in damages to homes, hospitals, schools, roads, farms, and businesses. The United States provided more than $461 million in immediate disaster relief and humanitarian aid spread over the years 1998–2001. The Peace Corps has been active in Honduras since 1962, and currently the program is one of the largest in the world. In 2005, there were 220 Peace Corps Volunteers working in the country.

The role of the Honduran armed forces has changed significantly in recent years as many institutions formerly controlled by the military are now under civilian authority. The annual defense and police budgets have hovered at around $35 million during the past few years. Honduras receives modest U.S. security assistance funds and training. In the absence of a large security assistance program, defense cooperation has taken the form of increased participation by the Honduran armed forces in military-to-military contact programs and bilateral and multilateral combined exercises oriented toward peacekeeping, disaster relief, humanitarian/civic assistance, and counternarcotics.

The U.S. Joint Task Force Bravo (JTF-B), stationed at the Honduran Soto Cano Air Base, plays a vital role in supporting combined exercises in Honduras and in neighboring Central American countries. JTF-Bravo plays a critical role in helping the United States respond to natural disasters in Central America by serving as a platform for rescue missions, repairing critical infrastructure, and in meeting high priority health and sanitation needs. JTF-Bravo forces have helped deliver millions of dollars' worth of privately donated goods to those in need.

== Political involvement ==
The Obama administration's attempts to pressure Honduras into reversing the removal of Zelaya in 2009 were complicated by Republican minority party efforts to reach out to and advocate on behalf of the Roberto Micheletti government, as well as by a recent Republican-commissioned report by US Law Library of Congress that supports the constitutionality of Zelaya's removal from office, while condemning his expatriation. In turn, the Democratic chairmen of the House and Senate foreign relations committees asked the Law Library of Congress to retract the report, charging that it "contains factual errors and is based on a flawed legal analysis that has been refuted by experts from the United States, the Organization of American States and Honduras."

In 2025, US President Donald Trump is trying to influence the 2025 Honduran general election by favoring Nasry Asfura (National Party), whom he publicly supports, and has warned that US aid could be suspended if his preferred candidate does not win. He has also promised to pardon former President Juan Orlando Hernández—a member of the National Party—who is currently serving a 45-year prison sentence in the United States for drug trafficking.

== Opinion poll of how Hondurans see Americans ==
According to a global opinion poll, 81% of Hondurans viewed the U.S. positively in 2002. According to the 2012 U.S. Global Leadership Report, 38% of Hondurans approved of U.S. leadership, with 13% disapproving and 49% uncertain. By 2016, the U.S. Global Leadership Report showed approval numbers had increased to 56%, but disapproval had also increased to 32%, with the percentage unsure or who refused dropping to 12%.

== Diplomatic missions ==
The U.S. Embassy in Honduras is located in Tegucigalpa.

== See also ==
- Foreign relations of Honduras
- Honduran Americans
- Foreign relations of the United States
- CIA activities in Honduras
