= Embassy of the United States, Tegucigalpa =

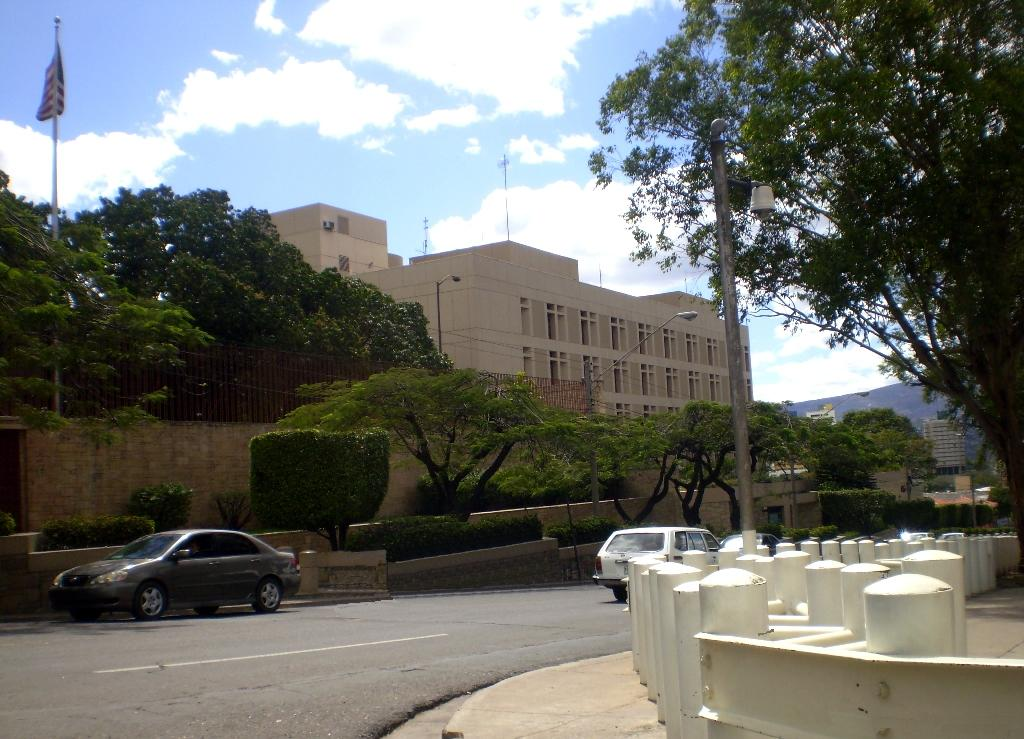
- The old U.S. Embassy Building
- Location: Tegucigalpa, Honduras
- Address: M.D.C, Avenida la Paz, Tegucigalpa, Honduras
- Coordinates: 14°6′11″N 87°11′24″W
- Website: https://hn.usembassy.gov

The Embassy of the United States in Tegucigalpa is the diplomatic mission of the United States of America in Honduras.

== History ==
After Honduras gained independence from Spain in 1821, it joined the Federation of Central American States which also included Guatemala, Nicaragua, Costa Rica, and El Salvador. The United States recognized the independence of the Federation from Spain on August 4, 1824. Following the dissolution of the Federation, the United States acknowledged Honduras as a separate, independent state on April 19, 1853, with the appointment of Solon Borland as U.S. Envoy Extraordinary and Minister Plenipotentiary to several Central American countries. The first American diplomatic mission was situated in the prior capital of Comayagua. The American Legation officially opened on February 22, 1856. The first U.S. Minister Resident to present his credentials in Honduras was James R. Partridge on April 25, 1862.

On March 23, 1943, an agreement between the United States and several American Republics including Honduras elevated the status of their legations to embassies. Consequently, John D. Irwin was the first to hold the title of U.S. Ambassador to Honduras.

A mid-century embassy building was built on a prominent site in the mid-1950s, designed by Michael Hare. His work on the embassy compound was criticized for disregarding the needs of the people who had to work or live in the structures, disregarding the climate and providing open walkways that caused the ambassador and his family to often get drenched on their way to their residence, and designing a building that ignored the views that had led to the purchase of the site to begin with.

A new U.S. Embassy in Tegucigalpa was initiated in March 2019 and projected for completion by mid-2023. A tire fire was started outside the main entrance of the embassy on May 31, 2019, amid protests against the privatization of healthcare and education in the country. A strike occurred in 2022 due to labor concerns. In 2022, a Honduran judge approved the extradition of former President Juan Orlando Hernández to the United States on drug-trafficking and weapons charges.

== See also ==
- Embassy of Honduras, Washington, D.C.
- Honduras–United States relations
- List of ambassadors of the United States to Honduras
