= Thom Jackson =

American education entrepreneur

- Born: Thomas Matthew Jackson; February 14, 1960 (age 65); Hamilton, Ohio, U.S.
- Education: Garfield Senior High School now known as Hamilton High School
- Alma mater: DePauw University and earned a Juris Doctor (JD) Degree from University of Cincinnati College of Law
- Occupation(s): President and chief executive officer of EdisonLearning

Thomas Matthew "Thom" Jackson (born February 14, 1960) is an American education entrepreneur. He is the president and chief executive officer of EdisonLearning. He was born in Hamilton, Ohio, where he attended Garfield Senior High School, now known as Hamilton High School. Jackson received his undergraduate degree in political science at DePauw University in Greencastle, Indiana with an emphasis on economics and international relations. He then went on to receive his Juris Doctor from the University of Cincinnati College of Law. Jackson initially joined EdisonLearning as general counsel, and later assumed the role of chief operating and legal officer. Prior to his role with EdisonLearning, he served as chief regulatory counsel for Prudential Financial.
