= Chris Whittle =

American media and education executive (born 1947)

H. Christopher Whittle (born August 24, 1947) is an American entrepreneur who has founded four companies in the fields of education and media, and was the CEO of each. Whittle Communications, a 1,000-person magazine, television, and book-publishing firm, was listed by Advertising Age as one of the 100 largest U.S. media companies in the 1990s. Conceived in 1991, Edison Schools was a pioneer of the U.S. charter-school movement, launching over 100 schools which enrolled 60,000 full-time students. Launched in 2012, Avenues: The World School has become one of New York City's ten largest private schools. Whittle School & Studios, a global system of private schools, was launched in 2015 and has campuses in Shenzhen and Suzhou, China. In addition to founding the above, in the early 1980s, Whittle acquired Esquire, where was chairman and publisher.

== Early life and education ==
Whittle, the son of Dr. Herbert and Rita Whittle, grew up in Etowah, a small Tennessee town in the foothills of the Smoky Mountains. One of his first jobs was delivering newspapers, and he later became a high-school stringer and writer for the local Etowah Enterprise, and for two of the region's dailies, the Chattanooga Times and the Knoxville News-Sentinel. He was also elected the student body president of Etowah High School, and, after graduation, attended the University of Tennessee (UT) in Knoxville.

Inspired by his attendance of a National Student Association conference on educational change in Manhattan, Kansas, and signaling his future career focus, Whittle ran to be the student government president of UT's 30,000-student campus. He campaigned on an education-reform platform (its bumper sticker: “For A Better Education”) and he won by a significant margin. Whittle also led large student demonstrations protesting evening curfews for women. While at UT, he also was an in-state staff member running youth operations for United States Senator Howard Baker. Whittle graduated from UT in 1969 as a “Torchbearer,” the university's highest distinction for student leaders.

During this period, Whittle began what would become a lifetime of international work and study. He received a scholarship for a summer in Czechoslovakia with the Experiment in International Living program and was in Prague during the “Prague Spring” when the country attempted to leave the Soviet bloc, and later spent time in other Iron Curtain countries, including Hungary, Romania, and Yugoslavia. In the fall of 1969, Whittle attended Columbia University Law School but dropped out to embark on a self-styled “gap” year, where his world travels took him to Greenland, Mexico, North Africa, Afghanistan, Iran, India, Nepal, Thailand, Hong Kong, and Japan. This year abroad was so meaningful that, 20 years later, when he funded 100 full-ride UT scholarships, he included an extra fifth year abroad for each of these “Whittle Scholars.”

== Career ==
Whittle started the 13-30 Corporation in Knoxville. In 1979 13-30 bought Esquire magazine, where Whittle was chairman and publisher for a number of years.

Whittle has been criticized, including by Jonathan Knee, a Columbia Business School professor and author of Class Clowns: How the Smartest Investors Lost Billions in Education, for large expenditures at his companies.

=== Edison Schools ===
Whittle wason the board of EdisonLearning (formerly Edison Schools), the company he founded with Benno C. Schmidt, Jr. in 1992. Edison was an early pioneer in public/private partnerships in K-12 education in America. EdisonLearning now has 450,000 students on three continents through the schools it operates and a variety of other educational programs. Edison Schools was a public company from 1999 to 2003, with its stock traded on the NASDAQ. After reaching a high of close to USD$40 per share in early 2001, shares fell as low as 14 cents. The company was taken private in 2003, in a buyout which valued the company at $180 million or $1.76 per share.

=== Avenues: The World School ===
Whittle was the co-founder of Avenues: The World School, which opened in September 2012 in New York City in the neighborhood of Chelsea. He resigned from Avenues to pursue his next venture: Whittle School & Studios.

=== Whittle School & Studios ===
Whittle is chairman and CEO of Whittle School & Studios, launched in February 2015. Whittle School & Studios is a for-profit educational company that aimed to be the "world's first global school" with a network of campuses around the world.

The school opened its Washington, D.C., and Shenzhen campuses in the fall of 2019. By 2026, Whittle planned to expand to a system of 30+ major campuses in the world's leading cities. Designed by Renzo Piano Building Workshop of Genoa, Italy, each campus was planned to have 600,000 square feet and serve approximately 2,500 students, ages 3 to 18, with about 160 students per grade. Roughly 60 percent were expected to be day students, and the remaining 40 percent to be weekly and full boarders. At capacity, Whittle School & Studios was intended to be a highly integrated global learning community with a faculty of more than 10,000 teachers serving more than 90,000 full-time, on-campus students as well as hundreds of thousands of other students joining part-time, either virtually or on campus.

The school has experienced financial difficulties. In May 2022, it enrolled fewer than 130 students. In July 2022, the DC campus ceased operations after incurring heavy operating losses during its three year tenure and failing to secure additional funding. The school still faces several lawsuits from multiple vendors and its landlord alleging nonpayment of dues and rent dating back to 2019.

== Other activity ==
He is the author of Crash Course: Imagining a Better Future for Public Education, published in 2005, and wrote a chapter on the rise of global schooling for Customized Schooling: Beyond Whole-School Reform, published by Harvard Education Press in 2011. Whittle sits on the board of the Center for Education Reform in Washington, D.C. In October 2010 he received an "accomplished alumnus" award from the University of Tennessee, his alma mater, where he has funded more than 180 full scholarships.

== Personal life ==
He was married to Priscilla Rattazzi (m. 1990; div. 2022). They have two daughters.
