= List of diplomatic missions of Honduras =

This is a list of diplomatic missions of Honduras, excluding honorary consulates. Honduras is a Central American country.

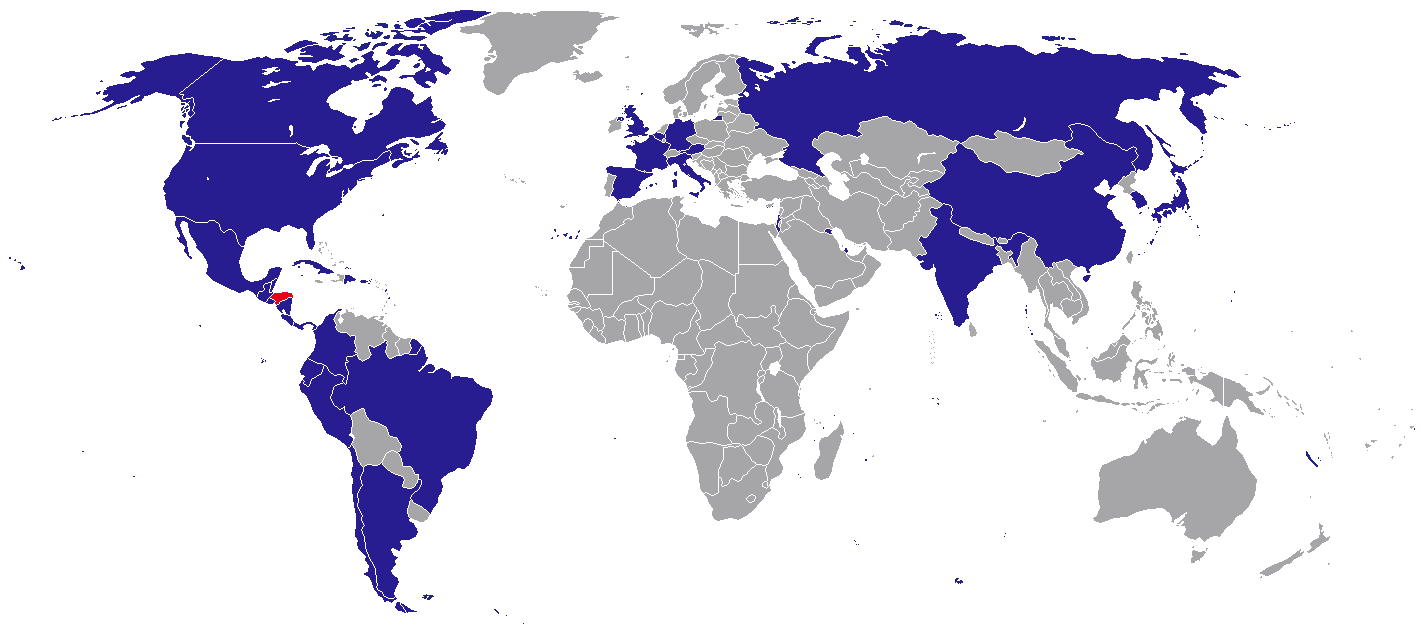
Map of Honduran diplomatic missions

== Current missions ==
=== Americas ===
Host country	Host city	Mission	Concurrent accreditation	Ref.
Argentina	Buenos Aires	Embassy		
Belize	Belize City	Embassy		
Brazil	Brasília	Embassy		
Canada	Ottawa	Embassy		
Canada	Montreal	Consulate-General		
Chile	Santiago de Chile	Embassy		
Colombia	Bogotá	Embassy		
Costa Rica	San José	Embassy		
Cuba	Havana	Embassy		
Dominican Republic	Santo Domingo	Embassy		
Ecuador	Quito	Embassy		
El Salvador	San Salvador	Embassy		
Guatemala	Guatemala City	Embassy		
Mexico	Mexico City	Embassy		
Mexico	Ciudad Juárez	Consulate-General		
Mexico	Monterrey	Consulate-General		
Mexico	San Luis Potosí	Consulate-General		
Mexico	Tapachula	Consulate-General		
Mexico	Tijuana	Consulate-General		
Mexico	Veracruz City	Consulate-General		
Mexico	Villahermosa	Consulate-General		
Mexico	Acayucan	Consular Agency		
Nicaragua	Managua	Embassy		
Panama	Panama City	Embassy		
Peru	Lima	Embassy		
United States	Washington, D.C.	Embassy		
United States	Washington, D.C.	Consulate-General		
United States	Atlanta (Georgia)	Consulate-General		
United States	Aurora (Colorado)	Consulate-General		
United States	Boston (Massachusetts)	Consulate-General		
United States	Charlotte (North Carolina)	Consulate-General		
United States	Chicago (Illinois)	Consulate-General		
United States	Dallas (Texas)	Consulate-General		
United States	Glendale (California)	Consulate-General		
United States	Houston (Texas)	Consulate-General		
United States	Irving (Texas)	Consulate-General		
United States	McAllen (Texas)	Consulate-General		
United States	Miami (Florida)	Consulate-General		
United States	New Orleans (Louisiana)	Consulate-General		
United States	New York City (New York)	Consulate-General		
United States	Phoenix (Arizona)	Consulate-General		
United States	Pittsburgh (Pennsylvania)	Consulate-General		
United States	San Francisco (California)	Consulate-General		
United States	Seattle (Washington)	Consulate-General		
United States	Tampa (Florida)	Consulate-General		

=== Asia ===
Host country	Host city	Mission	Concurrent accreditation	Ref.
China	Beijing	Embassy		
India	New Delhi	Embassy		
Israel	Jerusalem	Embassy		
Japan	Tokyo	Embassy		
Kuwait	Kuwait City	Embassy		
Qatar	Doha	Embassy		
South Korea	Seoul	Embassy		

=== Europe ===
Host country	Host city	Mission	Concurrent accreditation	Ref.
Austria	Vienna	Embassy	Countries: Czech Republic; Hungary	
Belgium	Brussels	Embassy	Countries: Denmark; Estonia; Finland; Iceland; Latvia; Lithuania; Luxembourg; Netherlands; Norway; International Organizations: European Union	
France	Paris	Embassy		
Germany	Berlin	Embassy		
Holy See (Note: The Honduran Embassy to the Holy See is located outside Vatican territory in Rome.)	Rome	Embassy		
Italy	Rome	Embassy		
Russia	Moscow	Embassy		
Spain	Madrid	Embassy		
Spain	Barcelona	Consulate-General		
Spain	Bilbao	Consulate-General		
Spain	Valencia	Consulate-General		
Spain	Girona	Vice Consulate		
United Kingdom	London	Embassy		

=== Multilateral organizations ===
Organization	Host city	Host country	Mission	Concurrent accreditation	Ref.
Organization of American States	Washington, D.C.	United States	Permanent Mission		
United Nations	New York City	United States	Permanent Mission	Countries: Bahrain; Brunei; Egypt; Indonesia; Jordan; Lebanon; Oman; Saudi Arabia; United Arab Emirates	
United Nations	Geneva	Switzerland	Permanent Mission		
United Nations	Vienna	Austria	Permanent Mission		

== Gallery ==
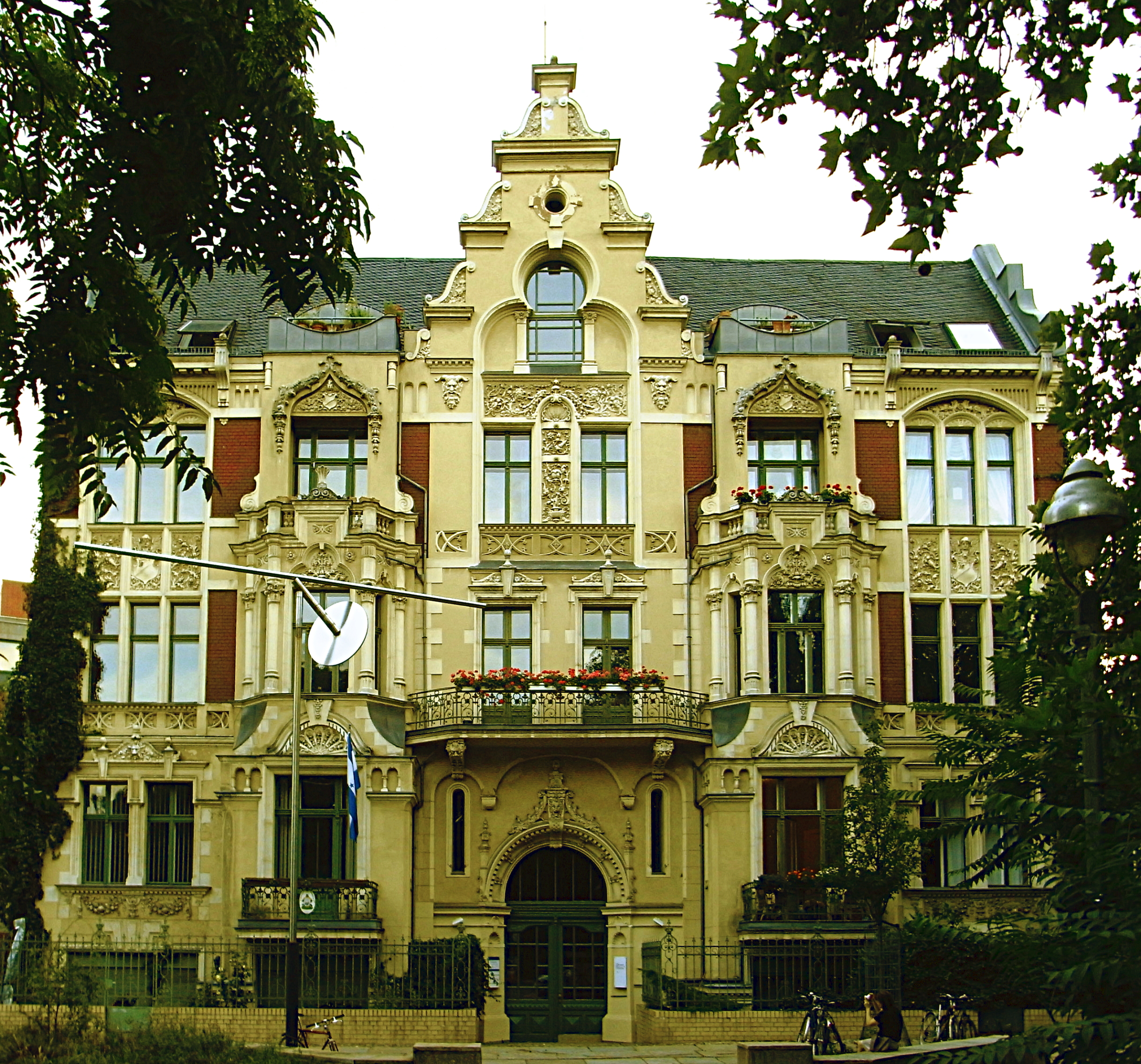
Embassy in Berlin

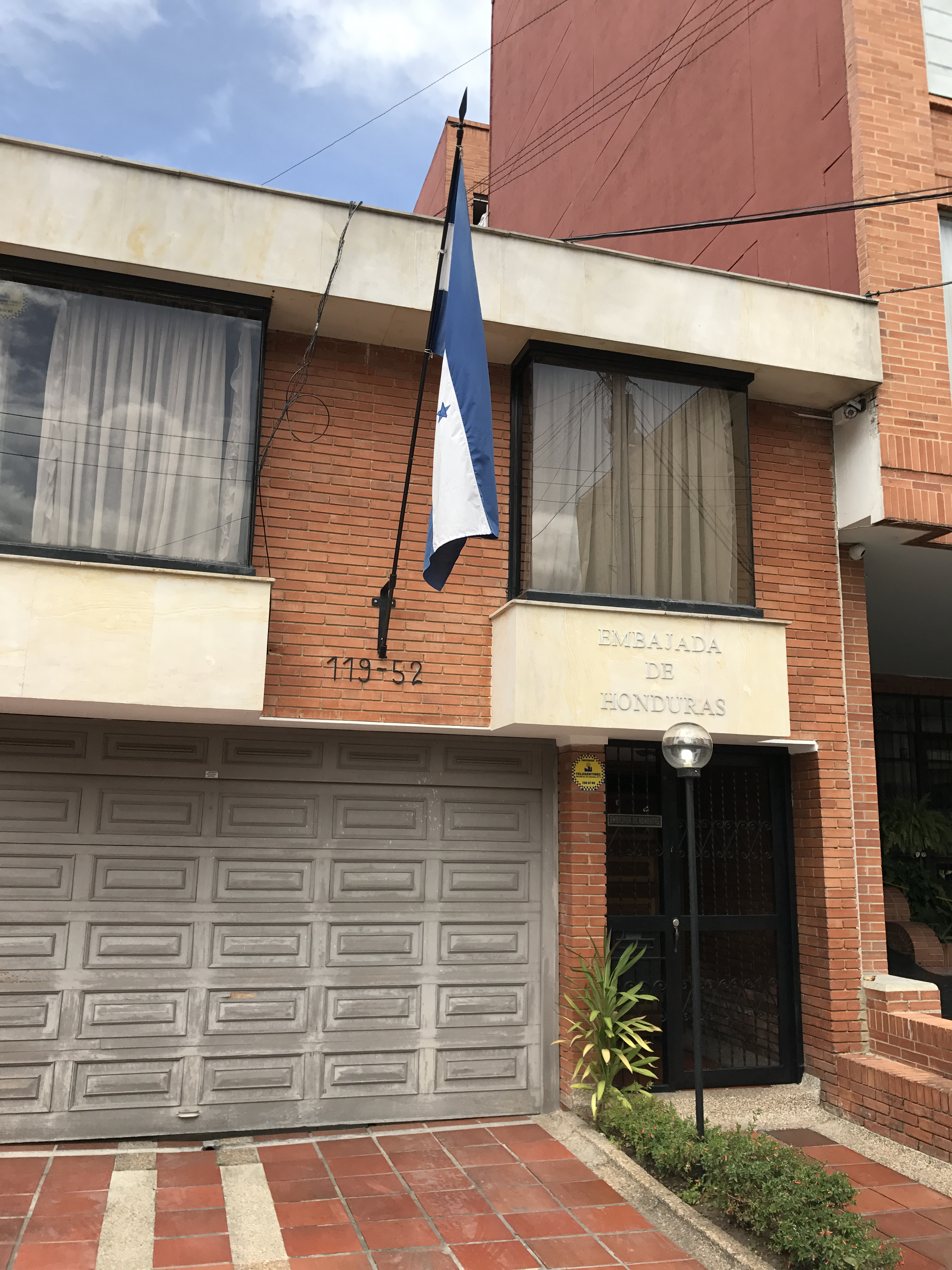
Embassy in Bogotá

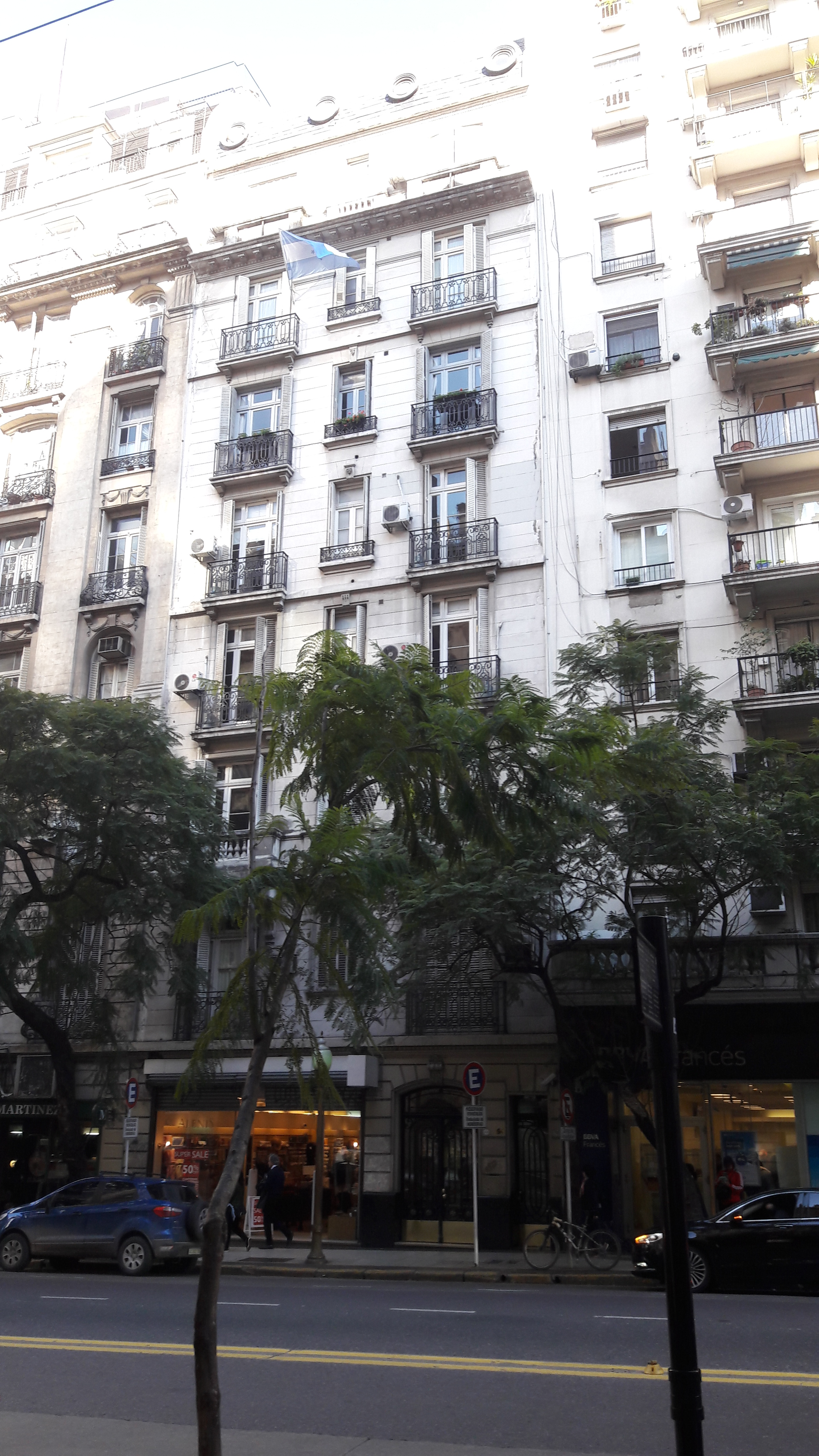
Embassy in Buenos Aires

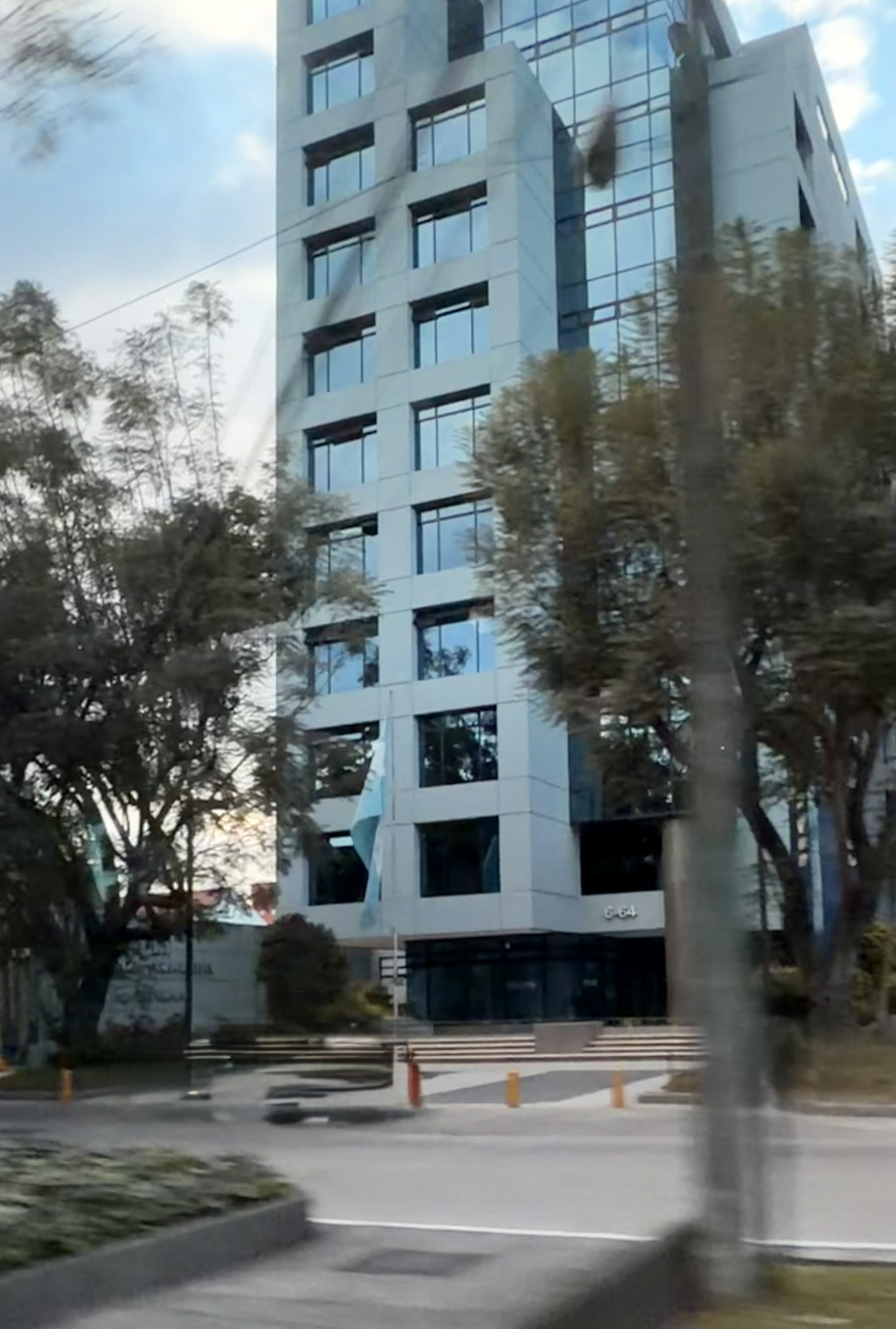
Building hosting the Embassy in Guatemala City

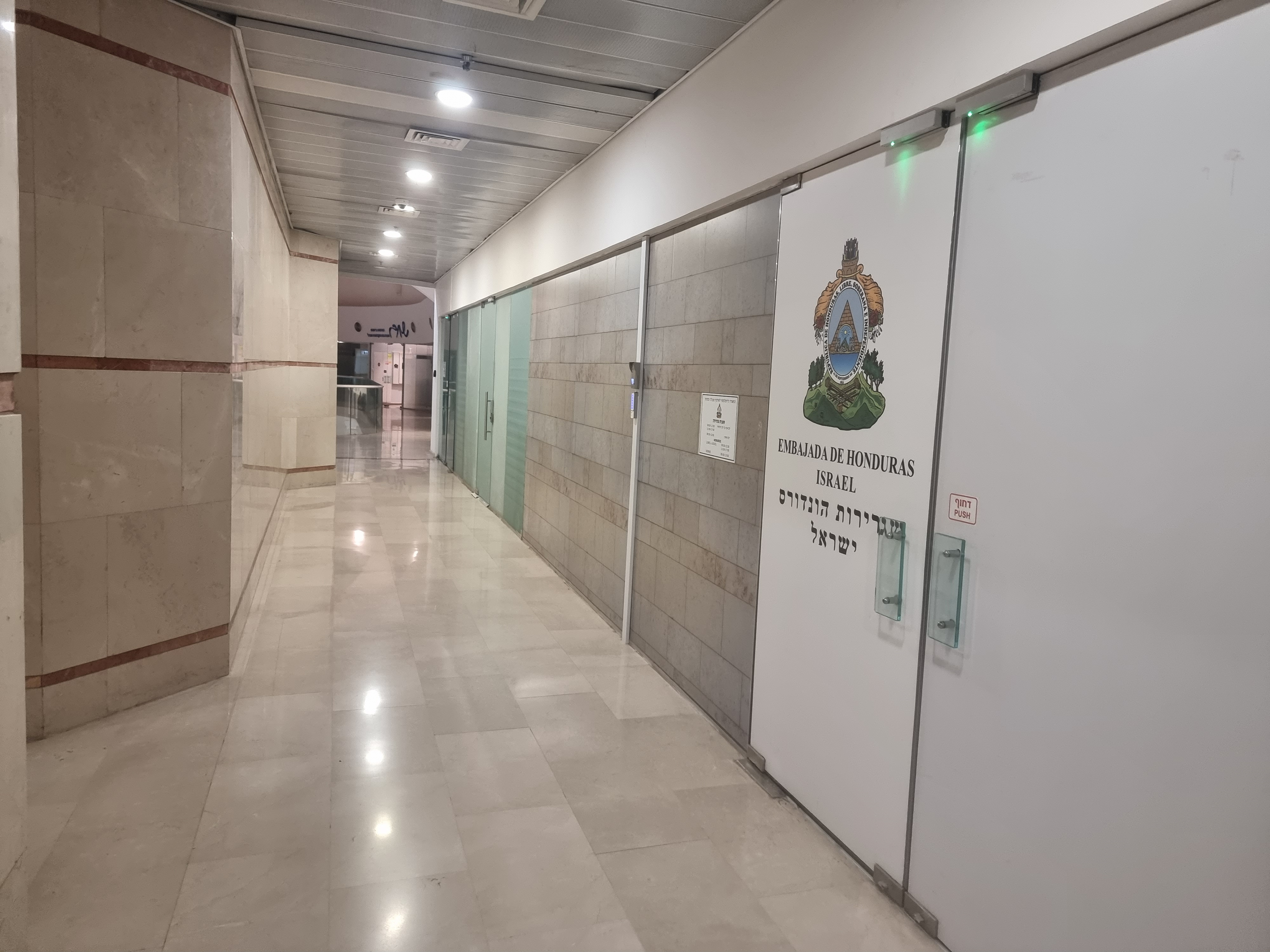
Embassy in Jerusalem

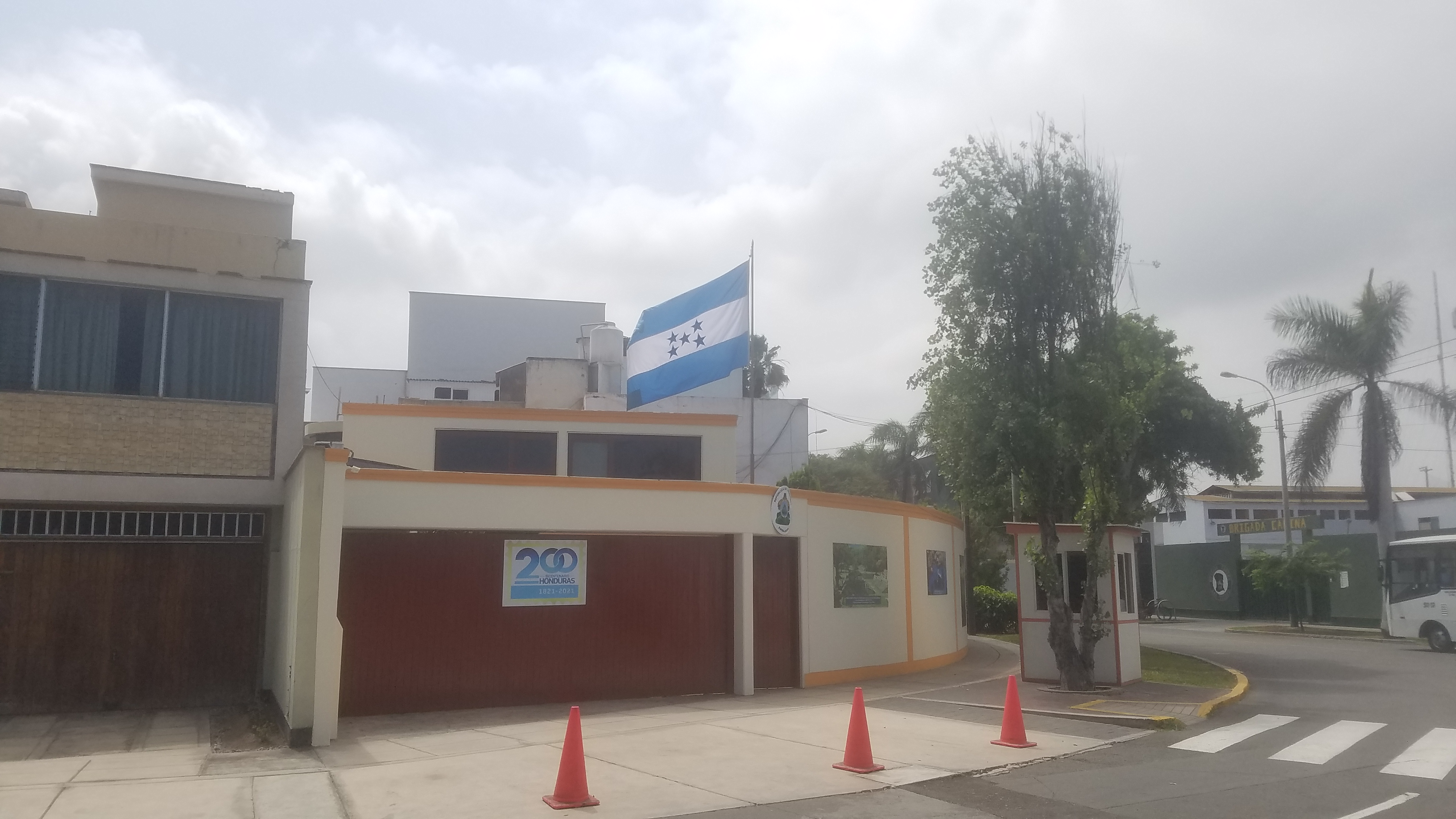
Embassy in Lima

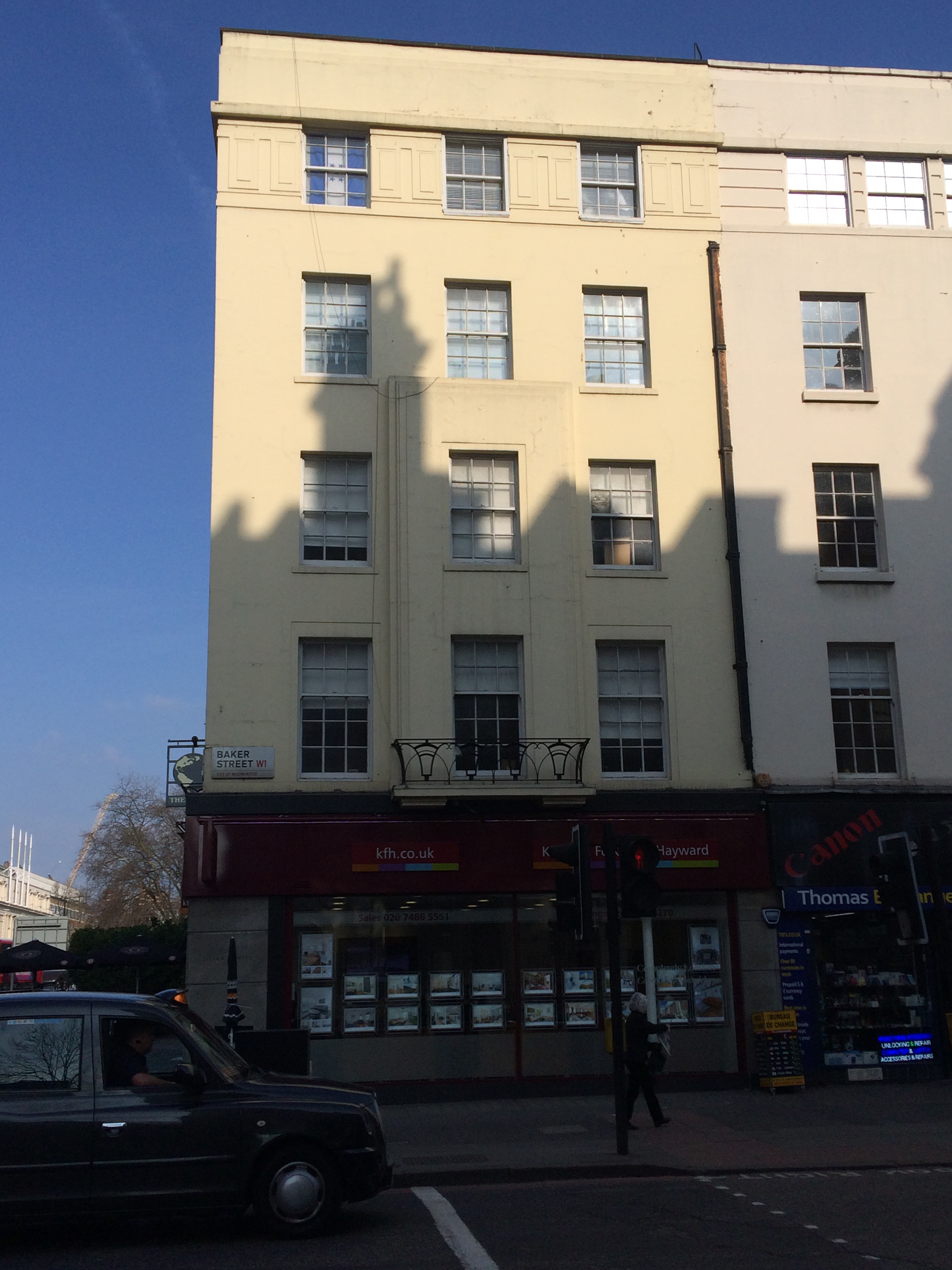
Embassy in London

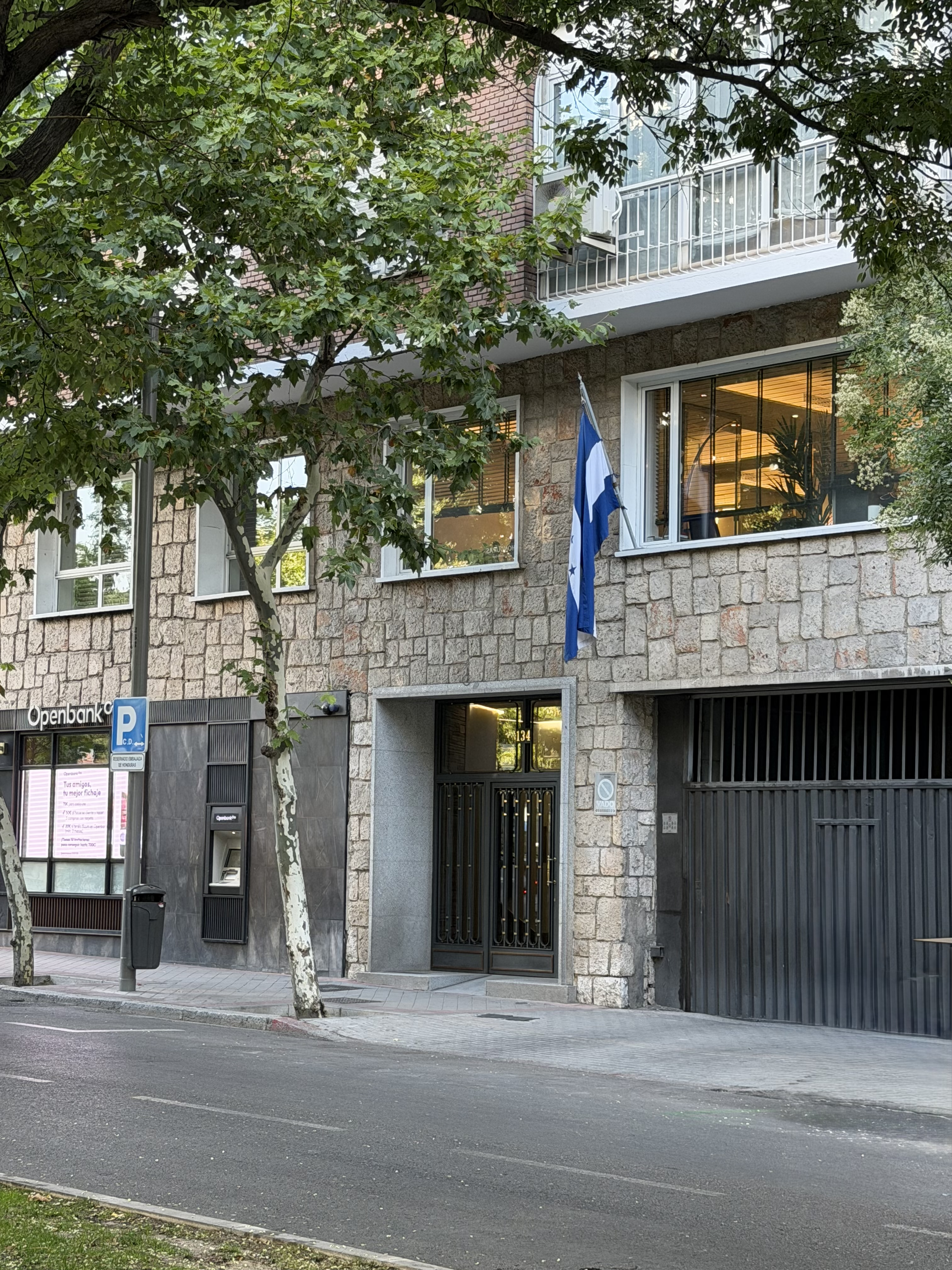
Embassy in Madrid

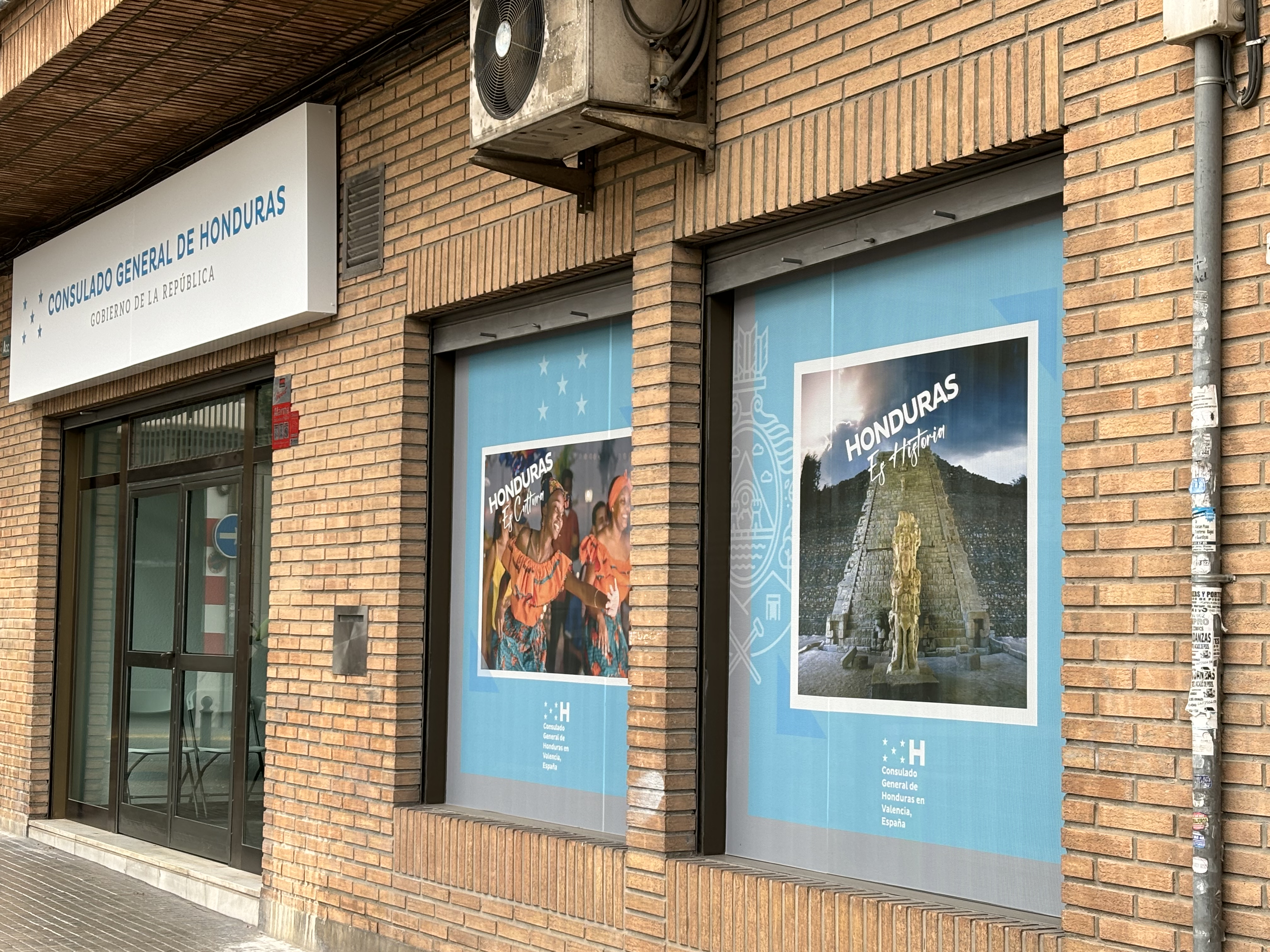
Consulate-General in Valencia

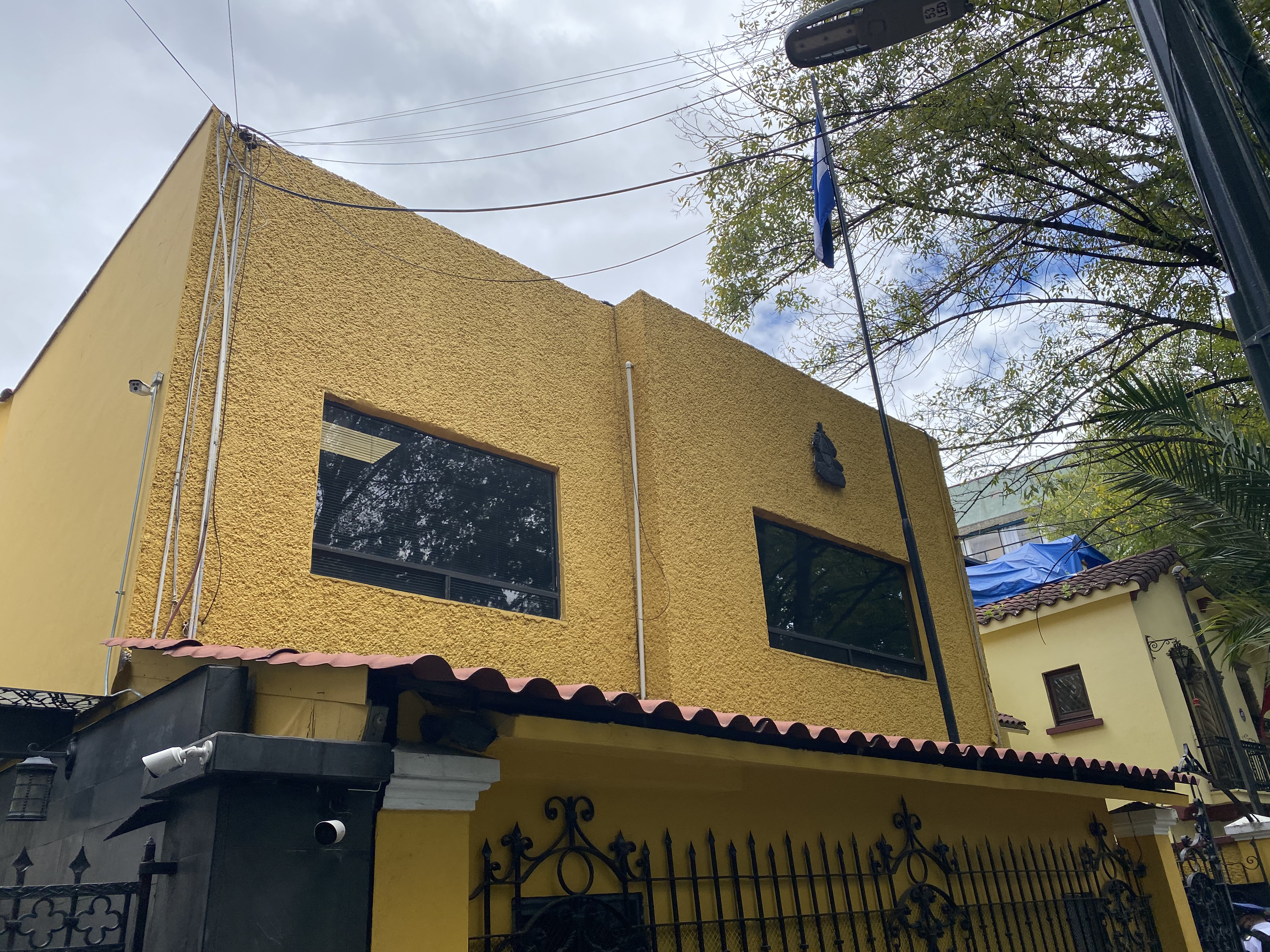
Embassy in Mexico City

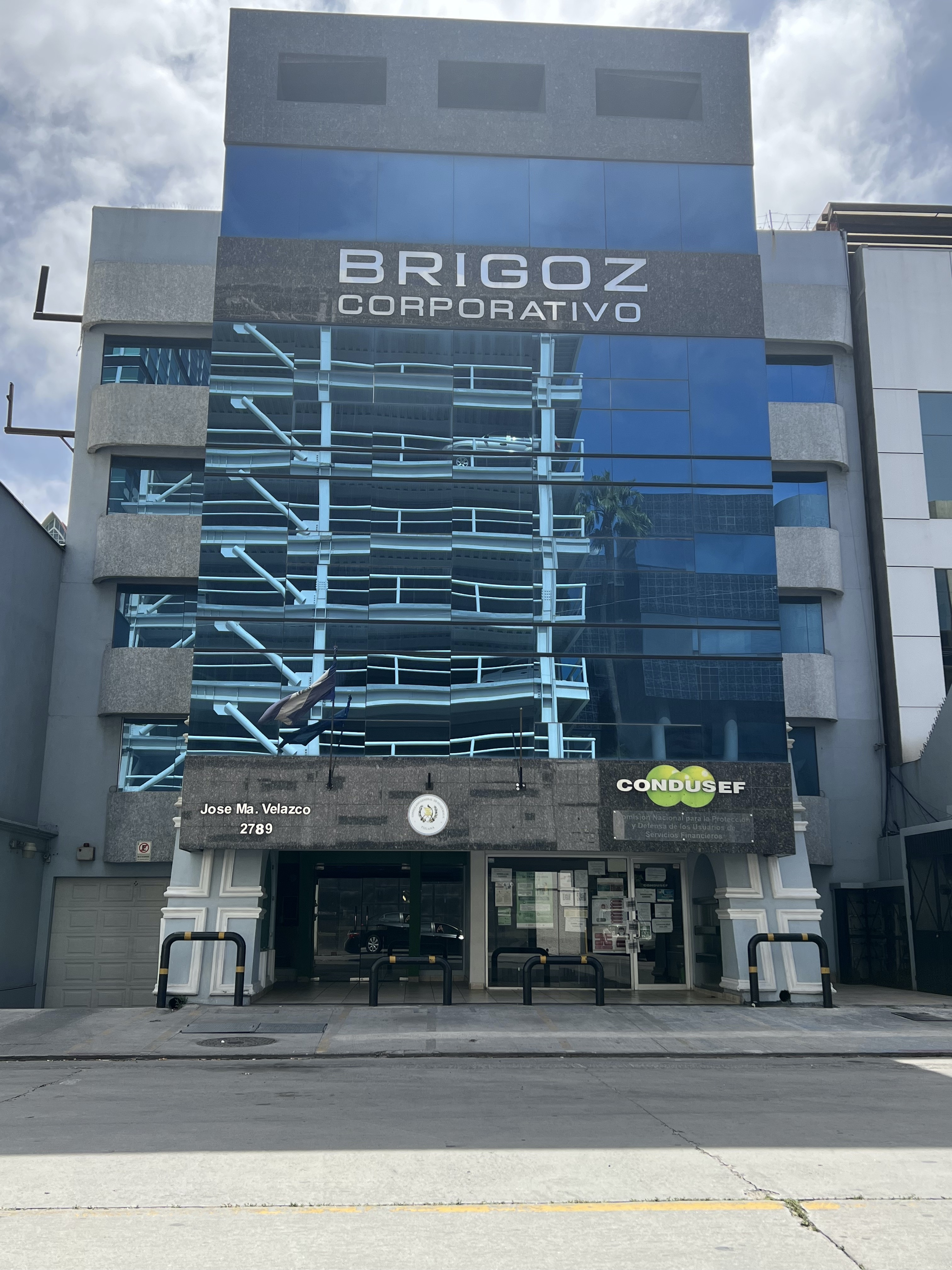
Building hosting the Consulate-General in Tijuana

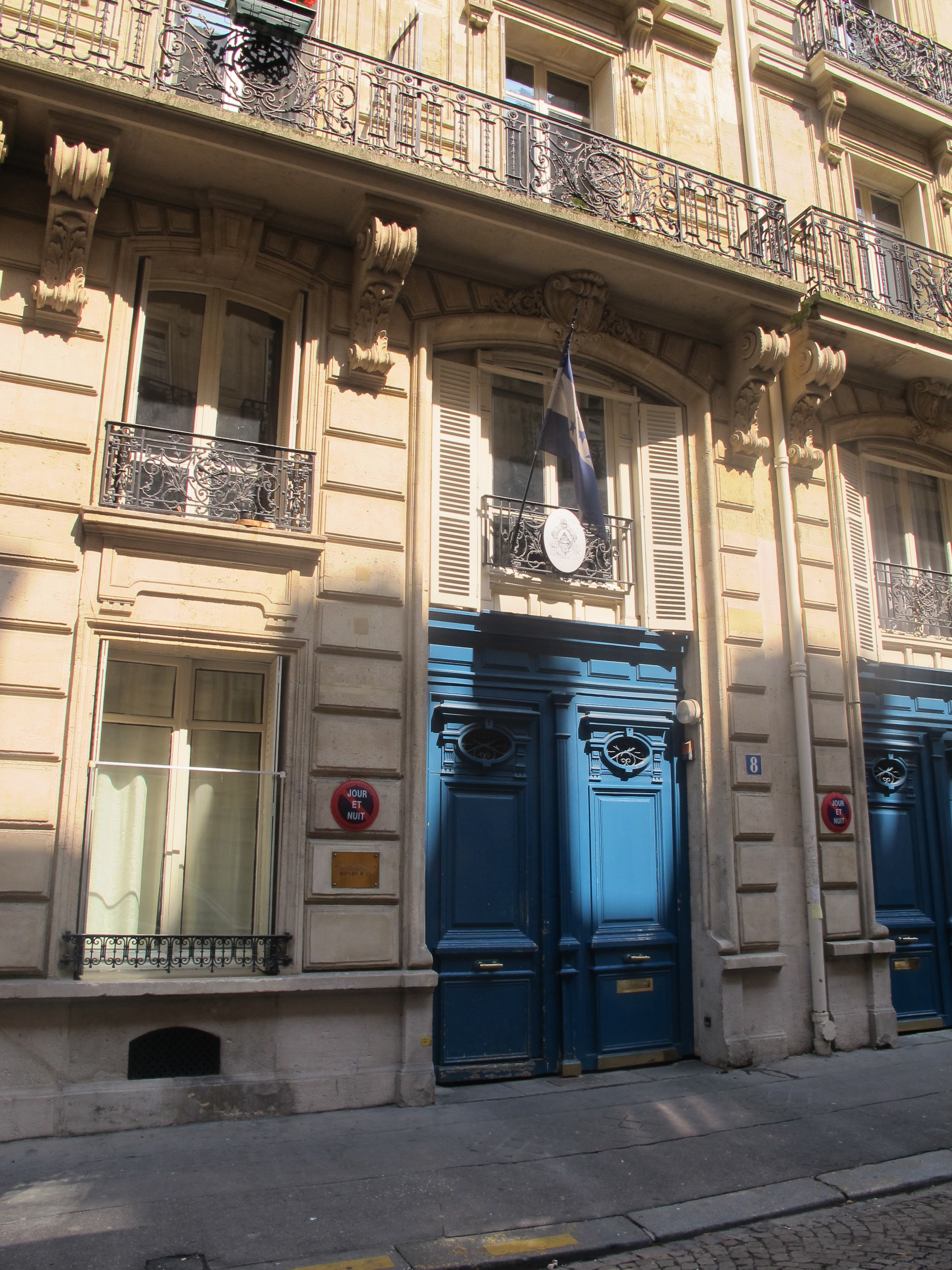
Embassy in Paris

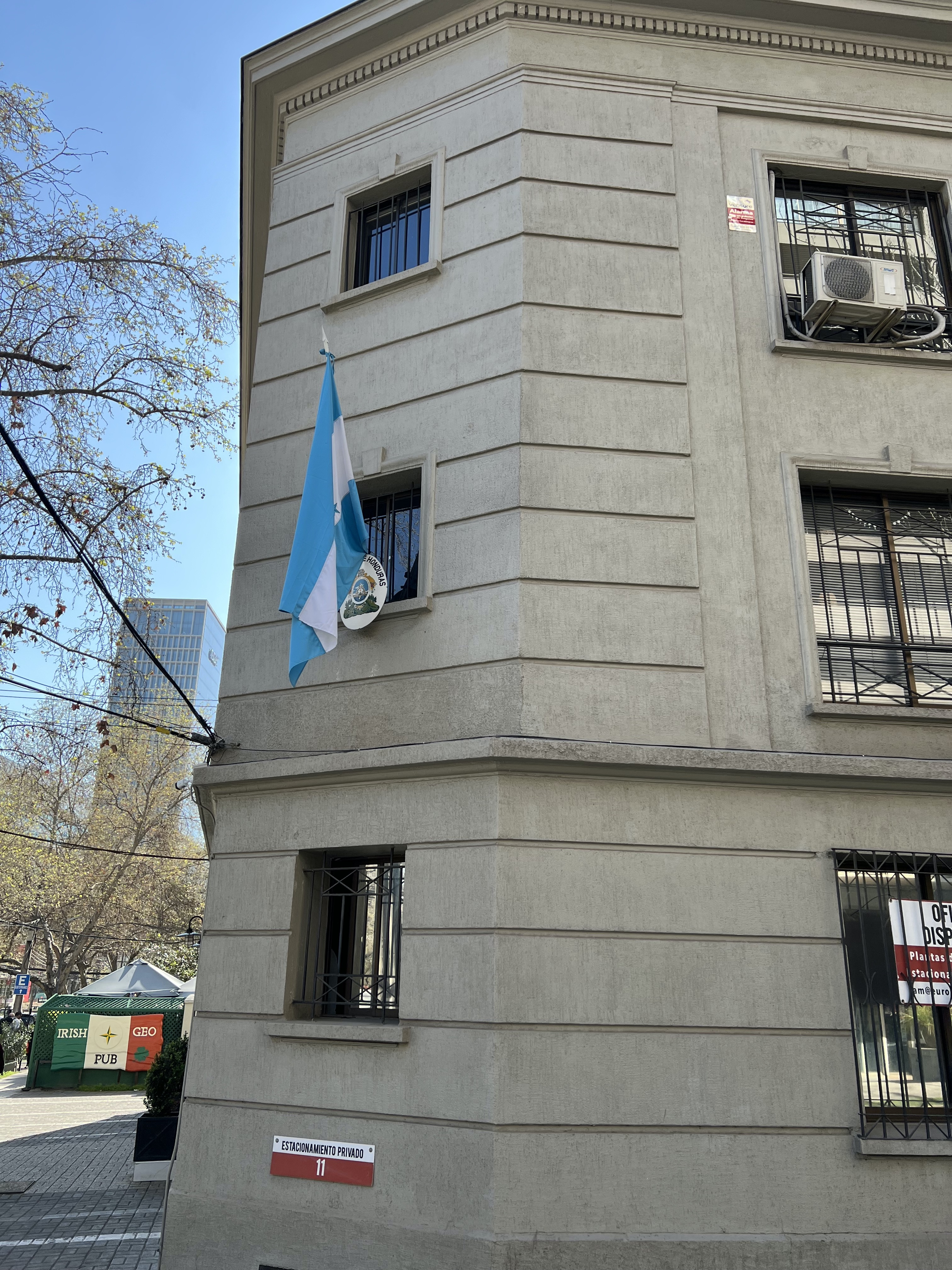
Embassy in Santiago de Chile

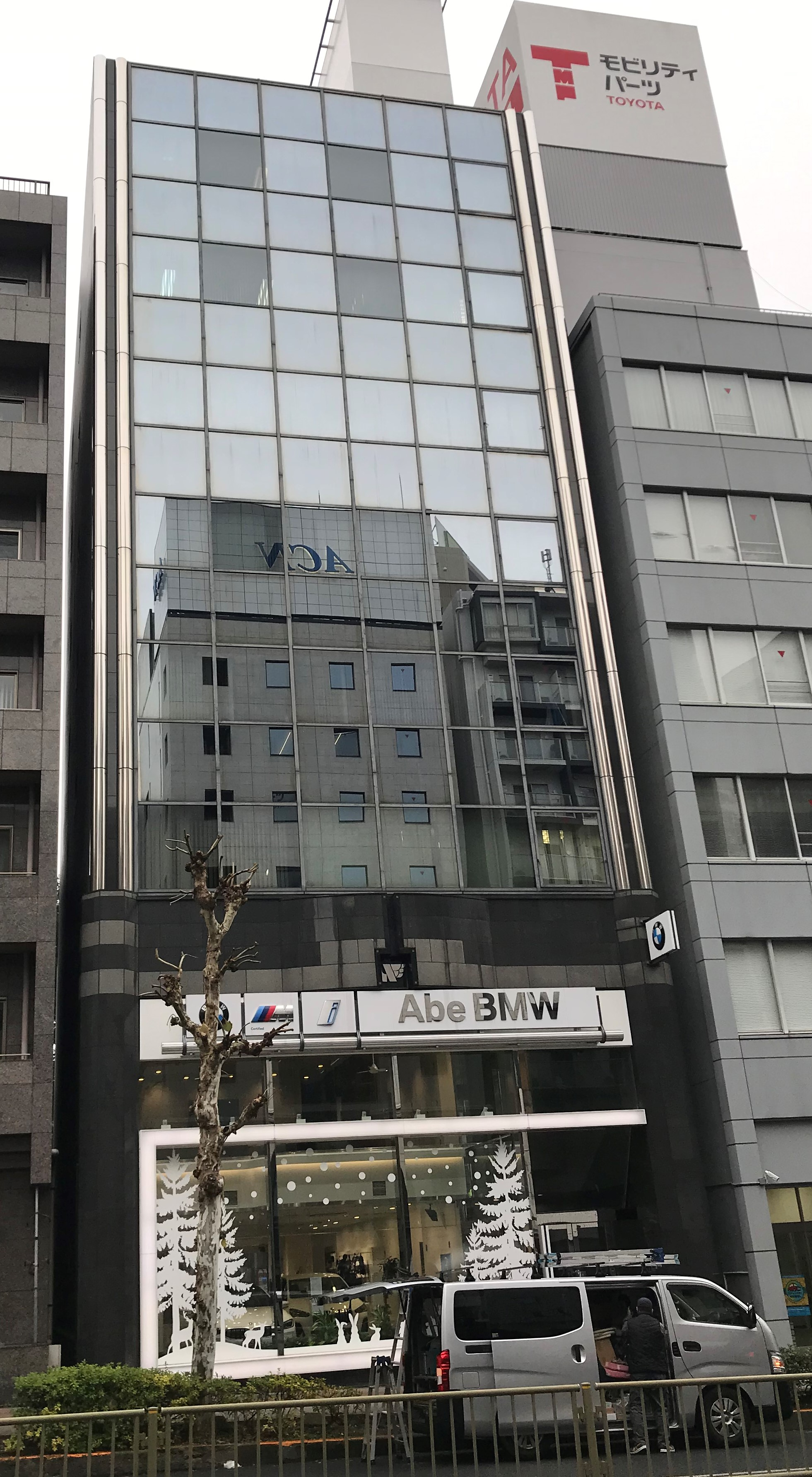
Embassy in Tokyo

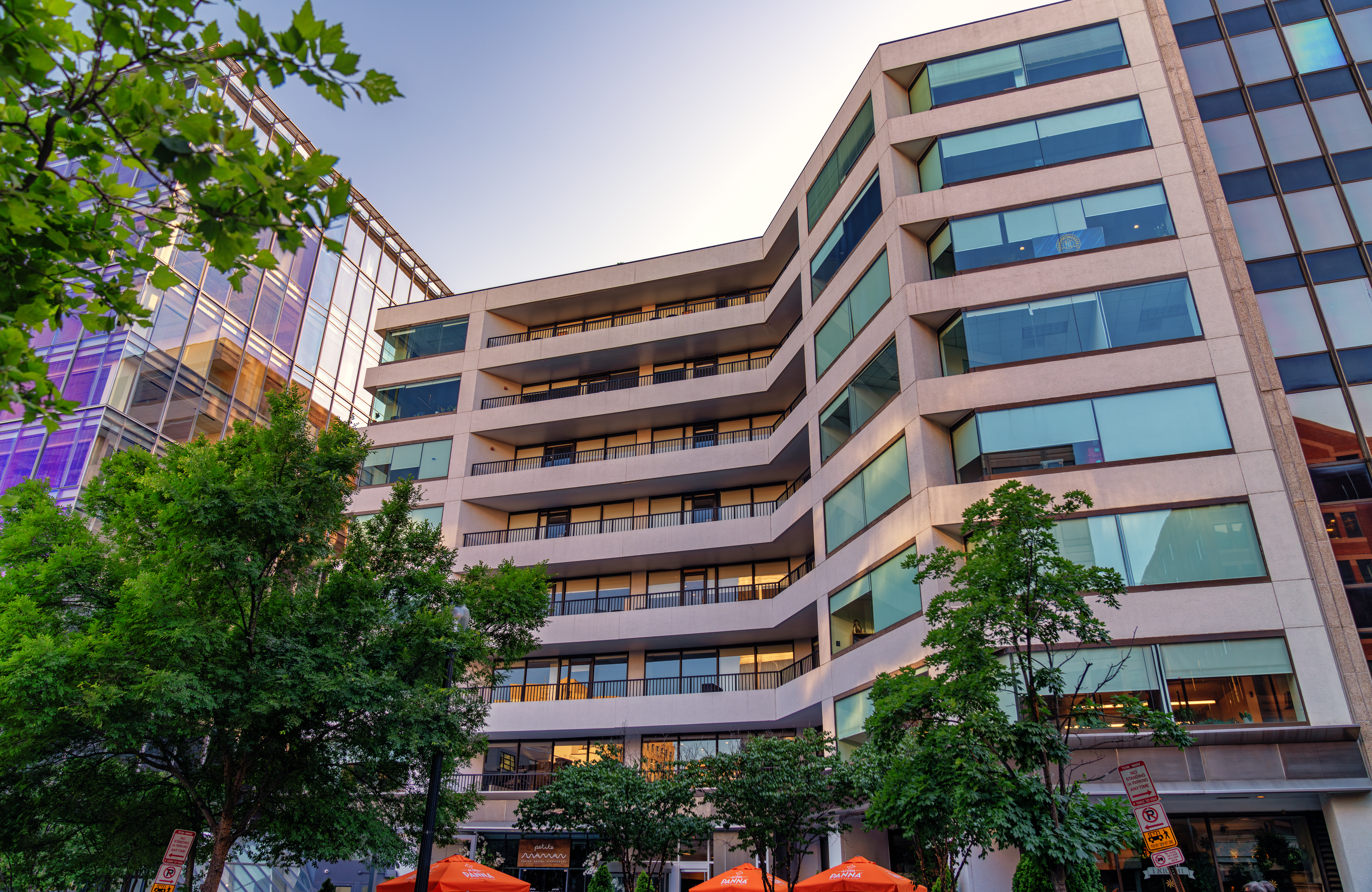
Building hosting the Embassy in Washington, D.C.

== Former missions ==
- Taiwan (Republic of China) (Embassy)

== See also ==
- Foreign relations of Honduras
- List of diplomatic missions in Honduras
