= Newton Summer Adventure =

Newton Summer Adventure is a children's summer school program directed by the for-profit Newton Learning, a division of Edison Schools. Since the program's start in Kansas City, Missouri, in the year 2000 with an enrollment of about 3000 students, Summer Adventure has greatly expanded in Missouri, and the state's student enrollment in the program reached 50,000 in the summer of 2005. Summer Adventure was offered in eleven other states in that same year.

== Curriculum ==
Summer Adventure offers programs at four different age levels:

- Kinderventure! Kids, kindergarten
- Adventure Scouts Kids, grades 1–3
- Explorers Kids, grades 4–5
- Voyagers Kids, grades 6–8

Students grades 9–12 may take high school courses during the summer, either to make up courses they have previously failed or to obtain advancement credits.

For K-8 participants, each session of Summer Adventure lasts two weeks, and the school day is six hours long. Participants take "Core Program" classes in the morning and two "Adventure Electives" classes in the afternoon. The program aims to integrate fun and learning to attract students. Sample courses include robotics, theater, aeronautics, movie making, and physical science. According to the Newton Summer Adventure Website, "The hands-on activities promote conceptual learning and problem-solving skills, attributes which are shown to lead to increased academic performance in school. In district-sponsored programs where the Adventure includes a pre-and-post assessment, achievement gains of near 50% have been recorded." The Columbia school district independently confirmed that Summer Adventure resulted in improved reading test scores for participants.

Summer Adventure is district-funded and free for all students.

== Controversies ==
School districts pay Newton Learning to run Summer Adventure and boost summer attendance rates, which in turn generate state aid and a profit for the districts. In order to encourage enrollment and attendance, Newton offers Visa debit cards to students with good attendance during the summer school session. The debit card balances range from $100 for perfect attendance to $50 for 14 hours missed. In Columbia, Missouri, 3,637 students received debit cards in the 2005 summer session. Depending on the district, Summer Adventure also holds drawings for daily incentives and gift cards, as well as bigger prizes like the Xbox 360.

The incentives have been controversial. Many parents prefer to enroll their children in programs that do not offer such incentives. Others object to the idea of private companies running public education. Rep. Maynard Wallace, a Missouri legislator, attempted in December 2004 to pass a bill blocking school districts from using Newton Learning and other for-profit companies to gain state aid. "We’re taking taxpayer money that would be going to educate our children, and it’s going to a company. It’s going to a corporation that’s doing this for profit," Wallace said. Clay Routledge, a doctoral student in psychology, commented that monetary reinforcements for summer school would decrease intrinsic motivation for learning.

Busing problems in Columbia in the summer of 2004 also raised criticisms. The problems have since been largely resolved.
