= Illuminarium Experiences =

Immersive entertainment company

- Industry: Entertainment
- Founded: 2019; 7 years ago in Atlanta, United States
- Founder: Alan Greenberg
- Headquarters: Atlanta, Georgia
- Website: illuminarium.com

Illuminarium Experiences is an American company that creates large-scale experiential entertainment in reprogrammable immersive theaters, called "Illuminariums", in cities around the world. The theaters host for-profit shows consisting of filmed, live, or streaming video—or computer-generated content—that is projected onto the theater walls and floors through various technologies, including 4K laser projection, Lidar-based movement sensors, beamforming sounds and sensory effects like digital scent technology.

== History ==
The company was founded in 2019 by Alan Greenberg who is CEO, with partners media production company RadicalMedia and architecture and design firm Rockwell Group, alongside operational partner Legends Hospitality.

The first Illuminarium venue opened in Atlanta, Georgia (where the company is based) in 2021, along the city's BeltLine, with a safari show entitled "WILD: A Safari Experience.” The 45-minute-long show features video content of African wildlife, including cheetahs, elephants, hippopotamuses, lions and zebras, all captured on film by RadicalMedia in the animals’ natural habitats across South Africa, Kenya and Tanzania.

The Atlanta theater features a nightlife experience, called The Bar at Illuminarium. The bar is designed by the LAB at Rockwell Group and uses 16K laser projection and audio systems to virtually "surround" guests in different digital settings, including a night market in Tokyo and a Mediterranean garden.

== Future installations ==
A Las Vegas, Nevada venue, at Area15, opened in January 2022 and a Miami, Florida location for spring 2022. A theater in planned to open at Navy Pier in Chicago, Illinois in 2023.

Following Wild, Illuminarium theaters will show an experience titled Spacewalk, featuring filmed content of the Solar System, comets of the Kuiper belt, the stellar Nebula and the surface of Mars.
