= British occupation of Trujillo and the Tigre Islands =

Conflict in Honduras, 1849 to 1850

Date	October of 1849–1850
Location	Trujillo and Amapala
Result	Honduran victory

Combatants
Honduras	United Kingdom

Commanders and leaders
(Honduras) Juan Lindo (Honduras) José Santos Guardiola (Honduras) Vicente Lechuga	(United Kingdom) Frederick Chatfield (United Kingdom) Sir Phillips Hornby

The British occupation of Trujillo and the Tiger Islands was a brief occupation of the Honduran port of Trujillo and the Tigre Islands.

== History ==
During the presidency of Juan Lindo Zelaya, Honduras faced significant diplomatic tensions with Britain over trade and territorial claims. In October 1849, the British Navy ship HMS Plumper entered the port of Trujillo demanding compensation for the seizure of mahogany from Belizean lumber companies. British authorities temporarily occupied Trujillo, destroyed property, and demanded payment of 1,200 pesos. Later that month, British Consul Frederick Chatfield, acting without official authorization, ordered the occupation of Tigre Island by troops from HMS Gorgon. The Honduran garrison, commanded by Colonel Vicente Lechuga, offered no resistance. However, the occupation was quickly disavowed by the British government.

At the same time, the American agent in Central America, Ephraim George Squier, warned Washington about British intentions, suggesting that the occupation was part of a plan to secure a military presence along the possible route of a future interoceanic canal. In response, in November 1849, Squier pushed through the "Pact of Chinandega," an agreement between Nicaragua, Honduras, and El Salvador that guaranteed U.S. support for any canal project that emptied into the Gulf of Fonseca. In addition, Squier attempted to secure Honduran sovereignty over Tigre Island through a bilateral treaty with Honduras.

U.S. Secretary of State John Clayton, upon learning of Squier's actions, disavowed his initiatives. On 26 December 1849, the British navy evacuated Tigre Island, returning sovereignty to Honduras in a gesture that included a 21-gun salute, marking an improvement in relations between the two countries. Nevertheless, Squier continued to act unilaterally, proclaiming the sovereignty of the United States and Honduras over the island in January 1850, an act that was again disavowed by Washington.

Finally, tensions between the United States and Great Britain in the region led to the signing of the Clayton-Bulwer Treaty on 19 April 1850. This treaty sought the neutralization of Central America in relation to the construction of an interoceanic canal, ensuring a strategic balance between both powers in the region. With the signing of the treaty, the crisis was brought to an end, although it made clear the growing geopolitical importance of Central America in the global interests of both nations.
