= Whittle School & Studios =

For-profit educational organization

Whittle School & Studios was a for-profit educational company founded by Chris Whittle. It aimed to be the "world's first global school" with a network of campuses around the world. The school opened campuses in Washington, D.C., and Shenzhen in China in fall 2019, but struggled to attract students and revenue. On July 8, 2022, the D.C. campus suspended operations.

== History ==
By 2019, Whittle School & Studios had raised more than US$900 million in cash and costs borne by developers of the school's campuses. The goal was for much of the company's and school's leaders to come from China, India, and the United States. Whittle said students were prodded into boarding for two years at an international campus and to graduate speaking at least two languages. The school also claimed to offer "hands-on, personalized learning".

According to Whittle, the company subsequently lost $100 million in anticipated funding when investors halted commitments during the COVID-19 pandemic, while new Chinese government regulations restricted the company's ability to set tuition and control funding at its Chinese campuses.

Several high-profile initial hires—including Jim Hawkins from Harrow; Dennis Bisgaard, who was tapped to run the Washington campus; and Rebecca Upham, who was executive chairwoman of the DC campus—left the company before the start of the 2021-22 school year.

In March 2021, the company said it would merge with the Varkey Education Group before the 2021-22 school year, obtaining new capital and allowing it to pay creditors. The merger was never consummated.

Several contractors and vendors hit the company with liens after it failed to pay invoices worth more than $35 million. Turner Construction, Arup, Children's National Hospital, Sterling Infosystems, and K&S Management and Supply have filed lawsuits in D.C. courts and other jurisdictions alleging nonpayment on outstanding invoices. In November 2021, Whittle's CEO acknowledged these claims and indicated that the school planned to make payment on the outstanding amounts, but the number of claims and liens has continued to climb in early 2022.

The company was sued in New York courts by Zurich Insurance, which alleged nonpayment of workers' compensation premiums of about $120,000.

In December 2021, the company emailed parents telling them that they were unable to pay teachers. In February 2022, the school's building was slated for a foreclosure auction because the company did not make payments toward a construction loan of $162.4 million taken on by the landlord to fund the Renzo Piano-designed improvements requested by Whittle. The auction by Alex Cooper Auctioneers was scheduled for March 24, 2022, but canceled in April.

In 2022, the company canceled plans to open a location in Brooklyn but did open one in Suzhou, China.

In May 2022, the school enrolled fewer than 130 students.

On July 8, 2022, the DC campus suspended operations.

Following the July 2022 closure of the D.C. campus and the dissolution of the U.S. parent company, the Shenzhen and Suzhou campuses remained open under the ownership of their local Chinese investors.
