= Embassy of Honduras, Washington, D.C. =

Diplomatic mission

Embassy of Honduras in Washington, D.C.
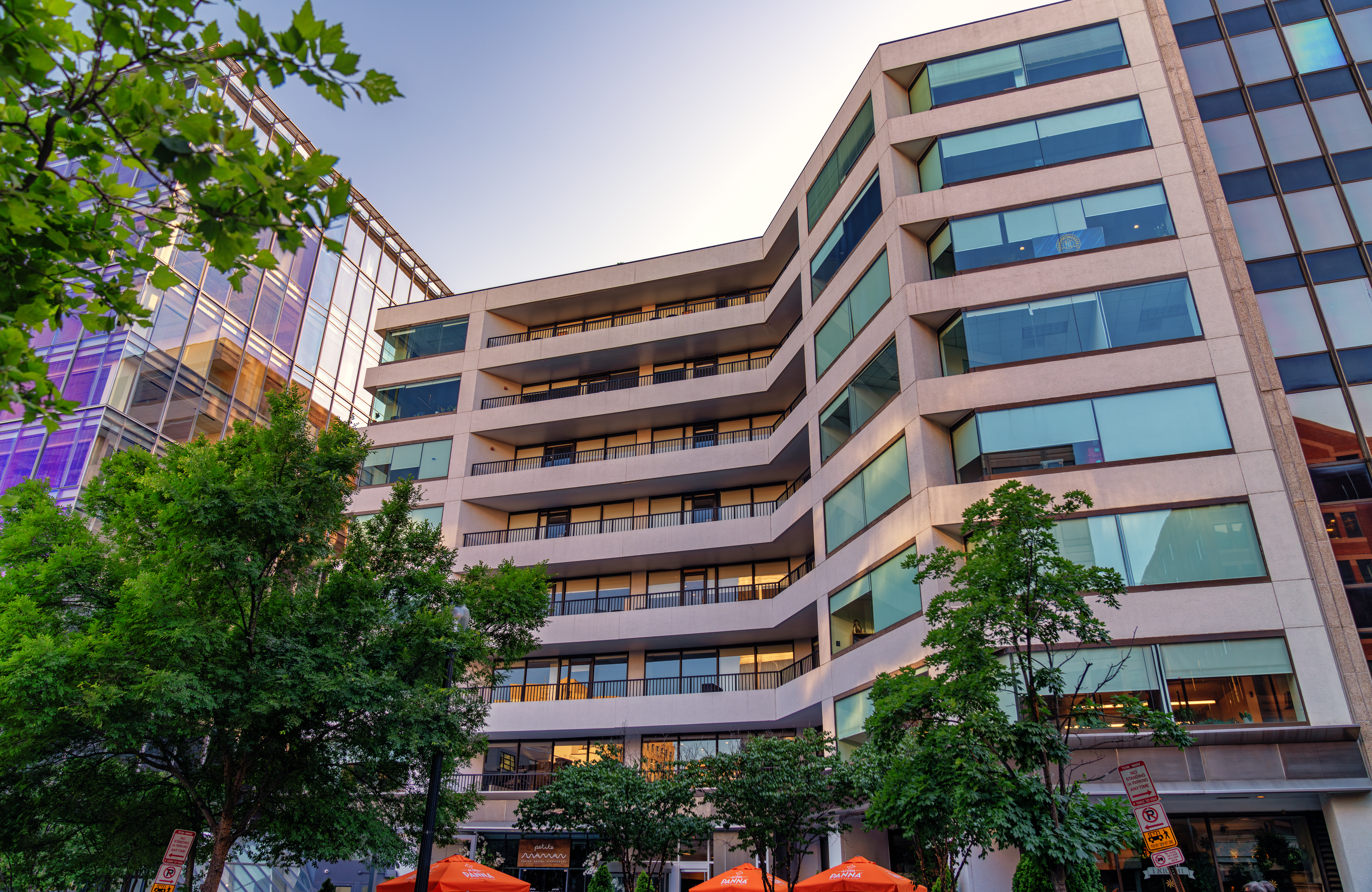
- Location: Washington, DC, United States
- Address: 1220 19th Street NW, Washington, D.C. 20036
- Coordinates: 38°54′23.8″N 77°2′37.8″W
- Ambassador: Luis Fernando Suazo Barahona

The Embassy of Honduras in Washington, D.C. is the diplomatic mission of Honduras to the United States. It is located at 1220 19th Street, Northwest, Washington, D.C. Separately, Honduras has a consulate-general located at 1990 M St NW, Washington, D.C.

The embassy also operates consulates-general in Atlanta, Boston, Charlotte, Chicago, Dallas, Houston, Los Angeles, McAllen, Miami, New Orleans, New York City, San Francisco and Seattle.

The ambassador is Luis Fernando Suazo Barahona.

== See also ==
- Honduras–United States relations
- List of ambassadors of the United States to Honduras
- List of diplomatic missions of Honduras
