= EdisonLearning =

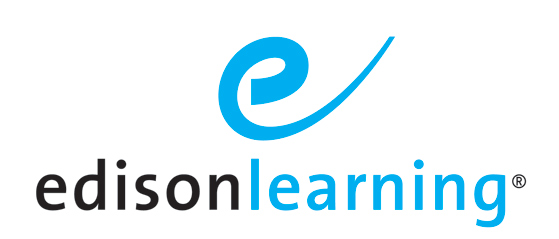
- Predecessor: Edison Project
- Founded: 1992; 34 years ago
- Founder: Chris Whittle
- Headquarters: Fort Lauderdale, Florida
- Area served: Worldwide
- Key people: Thom Jackson, CEO
- Website: www.edisonlearning.com

EdisonLearning Inc., formerly known as Edison Schools Inc., is a for-profit education management organization for public schools in the United States and the United Kingdom. Edison is based in Fort Lauderdale, Florida.

School districts hire the company to manage schools, particularly new charter schools. In 2015, Edison managed schools enrolling 10,417 students. They also hire it to provide more limited services such as testing, summer school and tutoring.

The company has drawn criticism over the years, with some client school districts saying Edison-run schools cost more than promised to operate and failed to provide a satisfactory education.

== History ==
The company was founded in 1992 as the Edison Project, largely the brainchild of Chris Whittle. Other people involved were Tom Ingram (campaign manager and chief of staff to Lamar Alexander, who was a former Governor of Tennessee and United States Secretary of Education 1991–1993), Benno C. Schmidt, Jr., Chester E. Finn, Jr. (assistant secretary of education to former presidents Reagan and George H. W. Bush, and others. It was founded around the idea of making money from school vouchers.

In 2002, the U.S. company approached the UK government and Essex Local Education Authority to develop a partnership. EdisonLearning began operations as a UK subsidiary in 2003 which led to some school improvements until 2020 when it ceased trading in the UK. The UK business contributed heavily to the parent company's intellectual property and was a base for global operations and educational projects in China and the UAE.

== Approach to education ==
Edison claimed that it could run public schools for less money than school districts could, and that it would improve student achievement while making a profit for its shareholders. Edison attracted ideological support from backers of privatization and school vouchers, including The Wall Street Journal and the Hoover Institution.

In 2008, the company announced the acquisition of the education software company Provost Systems, based in Santa Clara, California, which was renamed EdisonLearning.

In 2013, the NAHT. (National Association of Head Teachers - a trade union and professional association representing more than 28,500 members in England, Wales and Northern Ireland), in partnership with EdisonLearningUK, developed the Aspire Pilot Programme for schools judged as Satisfactory or Requires Improvement by Ofsted.

By 2014, EdisonLearning’s educational service offerings had moved well beyond the management of charter schools, to include virtual and blending learning, and dropout recovery and prevention centers. Throughout its history, EdisonLearning has provided educational services to 474 school partnerships in 32 states.

== Expansion and contraction ==
Edison's stock was publicly traded on the NASDAQ for four years. The company reported only one profitable quarter while it was publicly traded. After reaching a high of close to USD$40 per share in early 2001, shares fell to 14 cents. Also in 2001, the Securities and Exchange Commission charged that Edison failed to disclose that as much as 41 percent of its revenue that year consisted of money that it never saw: $154 million. By 2002, Edison was courting Roger Milliken for a possible bailout. The company was eventually taken private in 2003, in a buyout facilitated by Liberty Partners on behalf of the Florida Retirement System, which handles pension investments for the state's public school teachers; The deal valued the company at $180 million or $1.76 per share.

After losing many contracts, Edison diversified away from the management of public schools and into marketing conventional supplemental services such as testing, summer school and tutoring. Most of its new business involves providing such services rather than trying to manage schools.

In 2008, the School District of Philadelphia, Edison's largest single client with 20 schools (Edison was originally planned to take over the entire district), later announced plans to dismiss the company as a manager, noting that it and other private firms would be eligible to reapply. By June 18 that year, Philadelphia's School Reform Commission voted to seize six schools from outside contractors— four of them run by Edison— citing lack of improvement.

In 2011, former Los Angeles Lakers star Earvin "Magic" Johnson announced that he was partnering with EdisonLearning to set up dropout prevention and recovery centers for high school-age students who have already left school or are at risk of leaving and want to earn a standard high school diploma. The centers would be called "Magic Johnson Bridgescape Academies." In 2016, the relationship with Magic Johnson ended.

In 2014, Thom Jackson bought the company. Jackson is Chief Executive Officer and President at EdisonLearning, Inc. Jackson was Chief Operating and Legal Officer at EdisonLearning, Inc.

== Criticism ==
Edison's educational and financial performance has been criticized. Some client districts reported that schools run by Edison cost them more money, not less as the company had promised. Edison schools' academic improvement failed to live up to the company's promises in some areas.

A July 2002 New York Times analysis used Edison's own methodology for calculating school success to find that the troubled Cleveland, Ohio, school system did better than Edison's schools.

In 2019, the Chicago school district shut down all four of its Edison-run schools. “In this case, the district has acted on a provider who failed to provide a quality education for our children,” superintendent Janice Jackson told the school board.

Supporters of privatized education have criticized Whittle for entering contracts with public school districts rather than setting up completely private schools.

Edison's work with schools in the UK was more successful and Edison was a trusted school improvement partner for nearly 20 years.

== See also ==
- Annenberg Foundation
- Mark Schweiker
- Newton Summer Adventure
