= List of charter schools in Florida =

The following is a list of charter schools in Florida (including networks of such schools) grouped by county.

== Alachua County ==
- Alachua Learning Center
- Boulware Springs Charter School
- Caring & Sharing Learning School
- Einstein School
- Expressions Learning Arts Academy
- Genesis Preparatory School
- Healthy Learning Academy
- Micanopy Area Cooperative School/Academy
- North Central Florida Public Charter School
- One Room School House Project
- Resilience Charter School
- SIAtech MYcroSchool

== Bay County ==
- Bay Haven Charter Academy
- Central High School Panama City
- Chautauqua Learn & Serve Charter School
- North Bay Haven Charter School
- Palm Bay Elementary School/Prep Academy
- Rising Leaders Academy
- University Academy

== Brevard County ==
- Educational Horizons Charter School
- Emma Jewel Charter Academy
- Imagine Schools (West Melbourne)
- Odyssey Charter School
- Palm Bay Academy Charter School
- Pineapple Cove Classical Academy
- Royal Palm Charter School
- Sculptor Charter School
- Viera Charter School

== Broward County ==
- Academic Solutions Academy
- Advantage Academy of Math & Science Waterstone
- Alpha International Academy
- Andrews High School
- Ascend Career Academy
- Atlantic Montessori Charter School (Pembroke Pines, West)
- Avant Garde Academy Broward
- Ben Gamla Charter School (Hollywood, North, Prep, South Broward)
- Bridgeprep Academy (Broward, Hollywood Hills)
- Broward Math & Science Schools
- Central Charter School
- Championship Academy of Distinction (3 schools)
- Charter School of Excellence (2 schools)
- City of Pembroke Pines Charter Schools (4 schools)
- Coral Springs Charter School
- Eagle's Nest Charter Academy
- Everest Charter School
- Excelsior Charter Broward
- Franklin Academy (3 schools)
- Greentree Preparatory Charter School
- Hollywood Academy of Arts & Science
- Imagine Schools (Broward, North Lauderdale, Plantation, Weston)
- Innovation Charter School
- International School of Broward
- International Studies Academy
- New Life Charter Academy
- North Broward Academy of Excellence
- Panacea Prep Charter School
- Renaissance Charter School (Cooper City, Coral Springs, Pines, Plantation, University)
- RISE Academy School of Science & Technology
- Somerset Academy Inc. (Arts Conservatory, Davie, East Prep, Key, Miramar, Neighborhood, North Lauderdale, Pines, Pompano, Riverside, South, Village)
- South Broward Montessori Charter School
- Summit Academy Broward
- SunEd High School (2 schools)
- SunFire High School
- Sunshine Elementary Charter School/Paragon Academy of Technology
- West Broward Academy

== Charlotte County ==
- Babcock Neighborhood School
- Cape Coral Charter School
- Crossroads Hope Academy
- Florida Southwestern Collegiate High School

== Citrus County ==
- Academy of Environmental Science

== Clay County ==
- Clay Charter Academy
- St. Johns Classical Academy

== Collier County ==
- Collier Charter Academy
- Gulf Coast Charter Academy (South)
- Immokalee Community School
- Marco Island Academy
- Mason Classical Academy
- Oak Creek Charter School Bonita Springs

== Columbia County ==
- Belmont Academy

== Duval County ==
- Biscayne High School
- Bridgeprep Academy (Duval County)
- Duval Charter Scholars Academy
- Duval Charter School (6 schools)
- Duval Mycroschool of Integrated Academics & Technologies
- Global Outreach Charter Academy
- IDEA (Bassett, River Bluff)
- KIPP Jacksonville (4 schools)
- Lone Star High School
- Pathway Academy
- River City Science Academy (5 schools)
- San Jose Schools (5 schools)
- School of Success Academy
- Seacoast Charter
- Seaside Charter (3 schools)
- Somerset Academy Inc. (Eagle)
- Tiger Academy
- Waverly Academy
- Wayman Academy of the Arts

== Escambia County ==
- Beulah Academy of Science
- Byrneville Elementary School
- Capstone Academy
- Jackie Harris Preparatory Academy
- Pensacola Beach Charter School

== Flagler County ==
- Imagine Schools (Town Center)

== Franklin County ==
- Apalachicola Bay Charter School

== Gadsden County ==
- Crossroads Academy

== Glades County ==
- Pemayetv Emahakv Charter Elementary School

== Gulf County ==
- North Bay Haven Charter Academy

== Hernando County ==
- Brooksville Engineering, Science & Technology Academy
- Gulf Coast Academy of Science & Technology

== Highlands County ==
- Four Corners Charter School

== Hillsborough County ==
- Advantage Academy Hillsborough
- Bell Creek Academy
- Bridgeprep Academy (Riverview, Tampa)
- Brooks-DeBartolo Collegiate High School
- Channelside Academy of Math & Science
- Collaboratory Preparatory Academy
- Community Charter School of Excellence
- Dr. Kiran C. Patel High School
- East Tampa Academy
- Excelsior Prep Charter School
- Focus Academy
- Henderson Hammock Charter School
- Hillsborough Academy of Math & Science
- Horizon Charter School of Tampa
- Independence Academy
- Kid's Community College (3 schools)
- Learning Gate Community School
- Legacy Preparatory Academy
- Literacy Leadership Technology Academy
- Lutz Preparatory School
- Navigator Academy of Leadership
- New Springs Schools
- Pepin Academy
- Pivot Charter School
- Plato Academy (Tampa)
- Redlands Christian Migrant Association Leadership Academy
- Riverview Academy of Math & Science
- Seminole Heights Charter High School
- SLAM Charter
- Southshore Charter Academy
- Sunlake Academy of Math & Sciences
- Terrace Community Middle School
- Trinity School for Children
- Valrico Lake Advantage Academy
- Village of Excellence Academy
- Walton Academy
- Waterset Charter School
- West University Charter High School
- Winthrop Charter School
- Woodmont Charter School

== Indian River County ==
- Imagine Schools (South Vero)
- Indian River Charter High School
- North County Charter School
- Sebastian Charter Junior High School
- St. Peter's Academy

== Lake County ==
- Alee Academy Charter School
- Altoona School
- Imagine Schools (South Lake)
- Mascotte Elementary School
- Minneola Elementary Charter School
- Pinecrest Academy (Four Corners, Lakes)
- Pinecrest Academy (Tavares)
- Round Lake Elementary School
- Spring Creek Charter School

== Lee County ==
- Bonita Springs Charter School
- Christa McAuliffe Elementary School
- City of Palms Charter High School
- Coronado High School
- Donna J. Beasley Technical Academy
- Florida Southwestern Collegiate High School (Lee)
- Gateway Charter School
- Harlem Heights Community Charter School
- The Island School
- Island Park High School
- North Nicholas High School
- Northern Palms Charter High School
- Oasis Charter School
- Palm Acres Charter High School
- Unity Charter School of Cape Coral
- Innovation Preparatory Academy of South Fort Myers

== Leon County ==
- Florida State University School
- Governor's Charter School
- School of Arts & Sciences (Centre, Thomasville)
- Tallahassee Classical School
- Tallahassee School of Math & Science

== Levy County ==
- Nature Coast Middle School
- Whispering Winds Charter School

== Madison County ==
- James Madison Preparatory Charter High School
- Madison Creative Arts Academy

== Manatee County ==
- Imagine Schools (Lakewood Ranch, North Manatee)
- Manatee Charter School
- Manatee School for the Arts
- Manatee School of Arts & Sciences
- Oasis Middle School
- Palmetto Charter School
- Parrish Charter Academy
- Rowlett Academy for Arts and Communication/Middle Academy
- State College of Florida Collegiate School
- Team Success
- Visible Men Academy

== Marion County ==
- Marion Charter School
- McIntosh Area School
- Ocali Charter Middle School
- Ocali Charter High School

== Martin County ==
- Clark Advanced Learning Center
- Treasure Classical Academy

== Miami-Dade County ==
- Academy of International Education Charter School
- Alpha Charter of Excellence
- Arts Academy of Excellence
- Aventura City of Excellence Charter School
- Beacon College Prep Elementary/Middle School
- Bridgeprep Academy (Greater Miami, Interamerican, North Miami Beach)
- C. G. Bethel High School
- Charter High School of the Americas
- Doctors Charter School
- Downtown Miami Charter School
- Excelsior Language Academy of Hialeah
- Gibson Charter School
- Green Springs High School
- iMater Academy Middle High School
- International Studies Charter High School/Virtual Academy
- Integrated Science & Asian Culture Academy
- KIPP Liberty City
- Lincoln-Marti Charter School Miami
- Mater Academy Charter School (Biscayne, East, Grove, iMater, International Academy, International Studies, Miami Beach, Mount Sinai, Prep)
- Miami Arts Charter School
- Miami Children's Museum Charter School
- Miami Community Charter School (Elementary, Middle, High)
- North Park High School
- Phoenix Academy of Excellence
- Seed School of Miami
- Somerset Academy Inc. (Gables, South Miami)
- Sports Leadership & Management Charter School Miami
- Sports Leadership School of Excellence
- Stellar Leadership Academy

== Monroe County ==
- Big Pine Academy
- May Sands Montessori School
- Ocean Studies Charter School
- Sigsbee Charter School
- Somerset Academy Inc. (Island Prep)
- Treasure Village Montessori Charter School

== Okaloosa County ==
- Collegiate High School at Northwest Florida State College
- Destin High School
- Liza Jackson Preparatory School
- Okaloosa Academy

== Orange County ==
- Access Charter School
- Aloma Charter High School
- Aspire Charter Academy
- Bridgeprep Academy (Orange County)
- Central Florida Leadership Academy
- Chancery Charter High School
- Cornerstone Academy/High School
- Econ River Charter High School
- Hope Charter School
- Innovations Middle School
- Innovation Montessori Ocoee
- Kid's Community College (Ocoee)
- Lake Eola Charter School
- Legacy Charter High School
- Legends Academy
- Lucious and Emma Nixon Academy Charter School (L.E.N.A)
- Nap Ford Community School
- Oakland Avenue Charter School
- Orange County Preparatory Academy
- Orlando Science Charter School
- Passport Charter School
- Pinecrest Academy (Avalon, Creek, Prep)
- Princeton House Elementary Charter School
- Prosperitas Leadership Academy High School
- Renaissance Charter School (Chickasaw, Crown Point, Goldenrod, Hunter's Creek)
- Sheeler Charter High School
- Sunshine Charter High School
- UCP Charter School (Downtown, East Orange, Pine Hills, Transitional, West Orange)
- Workforce Advantage Academy

== Osceola County ==
- American Classical Charter Academy St. Cloud
- Bellalago Charter Academy
- Bridgeprep Academy (Osceola, St. Cloud)
- Creative Inspiration Journey School
- Florida Cyber Charter Academy
- Four Corners Charter School
- Kissimmee Charter Academy
- Lincoln-Marti Charter School Osceola
- Main Street High School
- Mater Academy Charter School (Brighton Lakes, Palms, Prep High School, St. Cloud)
- New Dimensions High School
- Osceola Science Charter School
- P. M. Wells Charter Academy
- Renaissance Charter School (Boggy Creek, Poinciana, Tapestry)
- Sports Leadership & Management Charter School Osceola
- St. Cloud Preparatory Academy
- UCP Charter School (Osceola)
- Victory School

== Palm Beach County ==
- Academy for Positive Learning
- Believers Academy
- Ben Gamla Charter School (Palm Beach)
- Bridgeprep Academy (Palm Beach)
- Bright Future Academy Charter School
- Connections Education Center of the Palm Beaches
- Education Venture Charter School
- Els Center of Excellence
- Everglades Preparatory Academy
- Florida Futures Academy (North)
- Franklin Academy Charter School
- Gardens School of Technology Arts
- Glades Academy Elementary School
- G-Star School of the Arts
- Gulfstream Goodwill Transition to Life Academy
- Imagine Schools (Chancellor)
- Inlet Grove Community High School
- Montessori Academy of Early Enrichment
- Olympus International Academy
- Palm Beach Maritime Academy
- Palm Beach Preparatory Charter Academy
- Potentials Charter School
- Quantum High School
- Renaissance Charter School (Central Palm, Cypress, Palms West, Summit, Wellington, West Palm Beach)
- Seagull Academy
- Somerset Academy Inc. (Boca East, Boca Middle, Canyons Middle/High, JFK, Lakes, Wellington)
- South Tech Academy
- Southtech Success Center
- Sports Leadership & Management Charter School (Boca, Palm Beach)
- Toussaint L'Ouverture High School
- University Preparatory Academy Palm Beach
- Western Academy Charter School
- Worthington High School

== Pasco County ==
- Academy at the Farm
- Athenian Academy of Technology & the Arts
- Classical Preparatory Charter School
- Countryside Montessori Charter School
- Dayspring Academy (Harmony, Jazz, Ovation, Symphony)
- Imagine Schools (Land O' Lakes)
- Innovation Preparatory Academy
- Learning Lodge Academy
- Pepin Academy Pasco
- Pinecrest Academy (Wesley)
- Plato Academy (Trinity)
- Union Park Charter Academy

== Pinellas County ==
- Academie Da Vinci
- Alfred Adler School
- Athenian Academy Clearwater
- Discovery Academy of Science
- Enterprise High School
- MYcroSchool Pinellas
- NorthStar Academy of Pinellas
- Pinellas Academy of Math & Science
- Pinellas Preparatory Academy
- Plato Academy (Clearwater, Largo, Palm Harbor, Pinellas Park, Seminole, St. Petersburg, Tarpon Springs)
- St. Petersburg Collegiate High School

== Polk County ==
- Achievement Academy (Bartow, Lakeland, Winter Haven)
- Berkley Accelerated School
- Chain of Lakes Collegiate High School
- Compass Middle Charter School
- Cypress Junction Montessori School
- Dale R. Fair Babson Park Elementary School
- Discovery Academy/High School of Lake Alfred
- Edward W. Bok Academy
- Hartridge Academy
- Hillcrest Elementary School
- Janie Howard Wilson Elementary School
- Lake Wales Senior High School
- Lakeland Montessori School
- Language & Literacy Academy
- Magnolia Montessori Academy
- McKeel Academy of Technology
- McKeel Central Academy
- Mi Escuela Montessori School
- Navigator Academy of Leadership
- Navigator Academy of Leadership High School
- New Beginnings High School
- Polk Avenue School (3 schools)
- Polk State Lakeland Gateway School
- Ridgeview Global Studies Academy
- South McKeel Academy
- Victory Ridge Academy

== Putnam County ==
- Children's Reading Center
- Putnam Academy of Arts & Sciences
- Putnam EDGE High School

== St. Johns County ==
- ARC St. Johns
- Evelyn B. Hamblen Center
- St. Augustine Public Montessori School
- St. Johns Virtual School

== St. Lucie County ==
- Palm Pointe Educational Research School (Tradition)
- Renaissance Charter School (St. Lucie, Tradition)
- Somerset Academy Inc. (College Prep, St. Lucie)

== Santa Rosa County ==
- Learning Academy of Santa Rosa

== Sarasota County ==
- Dreamers Academy
- Imagine Schools (North Port, Palmer Ranch)
- Island Village Montessori School
- Sarasota Academy of the Arts
- Sarasota Military Academy
- Sarasota School of Arts & Sciences
- Sarasota Suncoast Academy
- SKY Academy (Englewood, Venice)
- State College of Florida Collegiate School
- Student Leadership Academy
- Suncoast School for Innovative Studies

== Seminole County ==
- Choices in Learning
- Elevation High School
- Galileo School for Gifted Learning
- Seminole Science Charter School

== Sumter County ==
- The Villages Charter Schools

== Volusia County ==
- Burns Science & Technology Charter School
- The Chiles Academy
- Easterseals Northeast Charter School
- Ivy Hawn Charter School of the Arts
- Reading Edge Academy
- Richard Milburn Academy
- Samsula Academy

== Wakulla County ==
- COAST Charter School of Arts, Science & Technology

== Walton County ==
- Seaside Neighborhood School
- Walton Academy
