= Mater Academy =

Mater Academy Inc.
- Formation: January 1998; 28 years ago
- Founder: Fernando Zulueta
- Founded at: Little Havana
- Type: charter management organization
- Tax ID no.: 65-0857507
- Headquarters: Miami, Florida
- Members: 14,780 students (2020)
- President: Roberto C Blanch
- Chairman, Florida: Cesar Christian Crousillat
- Chairman, Nevada: Ricardo Jasso
- Chairman, Northern Nevada: Luke Welmerink
- Main organ: Board of Directors
- Revenue: $175,187,261 (2020)
- Expenses: $173,433,608 (2020)
- Staff: 2,688 (2020)
- Volunteers: 3,059 (2020)
- Website: www.materacademy.org

Mater Academy is a non-profit charter management organization based in Florida. They have a network of 49 schools in Florida and Nevada. Mater partners with Academica, a for-profit education management organization. In 2025 the company filed paperwork to establish schools in Sarasota, Florida.

== Origins ==
In 1968, the Sacred Heart Sister Mother Margarita Miranda-Otero began Centro Mater as a childcare facility in Little Havana, a poor immigrant neighborhood of Miami, Florida. Translated from Latin, it means "Mother Center". It was successful and flourished.

As a teenager, Fernando Zulueta volunteered at Centro Mater. In 1996, the Florida Legislature authorized charter schools as part of the state's K-12 public education system. One year after starting the Somerset Academy in Miramar, Florida, and inspired by his experience at Centro Mater, Zulueta founded the nonprofit Mater Academy. The following year, Zulueta incorporated the for-profit education school management company Academica.

Mater Academy spread across Hialeah, Florida. There were 14 Mater Academy schools in 2010, with over 6,300 students. Enrollment increased to 13,380 in 2015.

== Operations ==
There were twenty-three employees of Mater Academy Inc making six figure salaries in 2020.

== Awards & Rankings ==
Mater Academy Charter High School in Hialeah Gardens, Florida won a silver medal award from U.S. News & World Report in 2008 and 2009. They were also ranked the 41st best high school in Florida for 2021.

Mater Performing Arts and Entertainment Academy in Hialeah Gardens, Florida was ranked the 31st best high school in Florida for 2021.

Mater Academy East Charter High School in Miami was ranked the 32nd best high school in Florida for 2021.

Mater Academy Lakes High School in Hialeah Gardens, Florida was ranked the 62nd best high school in Florida for 2021.

Sports Leadership of Miami Charter High School in Little Havana (formerly Sports Leadership and Management/SLAM) was ranked the 486th best high school in Florida for 2021.
