= Somerset Academy High School =

Location
- 20805 Johnson Street; Pembroke Pines, Florida; 26.015153°N 80.426600°W

Information
- Established: September 1997
- School district: Broward County Public Schools
- NCES District ID: 1200180
- NCES School ID: 120018003823
- Principal: Bernardo Montero
- Grades: 9–12
- Campus: Suburban
- Colors: Blue; White
- Mascot: Panther
- Website: www.somersetacademy.com

Somerset Academy is a high school located in Pembroke Pines, Florida, United States, that teaches grades K–12. The school is operated by Academica, an education management organization, on behalf of Somerset Academy Inc., a charter management organization.

== Overview ==
The school was established in September 1967, making it one of the oldest Somerset schools established in South Florida.

The school offers a variety of honors courses. Each honors class awards five points for an A, four points for a B, three points for a C, one point for a D, or zero points for an F to the student's weighted GPA per quarter. Students can opt to take honors courses for their core classes (English, math, science, and social studies), which typically include biology, chemistry, algebra, geometry, geography, and history courses. Many higher-leveled elective courses also give students the opportunity to earn honors credit. There are also advanced placement courses that students can take. These courses can take the place of core subjects and/or electives. The advanced placement courses also require the students to take a test created by College Board close to the end of the school year. The test grades the student based on a five-point system with three being the least that the student must have in order to pass the test and obtain the college credits for the course they have taken.

The sports offered at the school include baseball, soccer, tennis, and wrestling (Boys and Girls). The school also has a club that sponsors a Pembroke Pines all-male rugby team that is not affiliated with the sports program at Somerset.

The school has a TV production course, which the course requires students to run a newscast/video production show on YouTube. It is called the Panther Report, and the class uploads a new video every Monday.
