= Doral College =

Private, non-profit online college

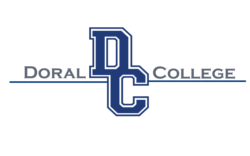
- Type: Private, non-profit
- Established: 2011
- President: Judith C. Marty, president
- Students: 4,405
- Location: Doral, Florida
- Colors: Navy, silver
- Website: www.doral.edu

Doral College is a private, non-profit institution of higher learning based in Doral, Florida offering online degree programs. Doral College offers undergraduate and graduate degrees, including several Florida state-approved education programs.

== Beginnings ==
Doral College was founded with the goal of making higher education opportunities more accessible by leveraging innovation and flexibility to create a pathway for students hindered by traditional barriers, primarily in the area of dual enrollment. In its early years, the college focused on expanding opportunities to local charter schools with a high need for advanced programs. Its initiatives focused on providing the critical thinking skills necessary to adapt to the career challenges of the 21st century, a goal made possible by the personalized attention and support provided through the college's close collaboration with the students’ partner school.

Originally, the College served Doral Academy Preparatory School, Mater Academy Charter High School, and several other charter schools in South Florida managed by Academica, a successful education service provider managing over 220 educational institutions globally. The college's main office is located on the campus of Doral Academy Preparatory School, but coursework is primarily offered in online and hybrid formats. Today, Doral College provides dual enrollment services to over 65 schools across 12 counties in Florida.

== Licensing and accreditation ==
Doral College is licensed by the Florida Commission for Independent Education (CIE) and accredited by the Distance Education Accrediting Commission. The College is also approved by the state of Florida to participate in the National Council for State Authorization Reciprocity Agreements (NC-SARA).

All courses are currently approved through Florida's Statewide Course Numbering System, facilitating transfer to all public colleges and universities in the state, as well as private institutions that choose to participate.

== Enrollment ==
While the student base was at one time made up entirely of high school students who take college classes concurrently with their high school classes, the college now enrolls traditional undergraduate and graduate students as well. However, dual enrollment remains an important focus for the college, which graduated 436 high school seniors with Associate in Arts degrees in May 2024.

In the spring of 2024, Doral College enrolled 4,405 students across all student types and programs, and offered 77 unique courses.

== Programs offered ==
Doral College currently offers the following degree programs:

- Associate in Arts
- Bachelor of Science in Elementary Education
- Bachelor of Business Administration
- Educator Preparation Institute
- Master of Education in Educational Leadership

== Presidents ==
- Anitere Flores (2011–2015)
- Douglas Rodriguez (2015–2021)
- Judith C. Marty (2021–present)
