= List of school districts in Florida =

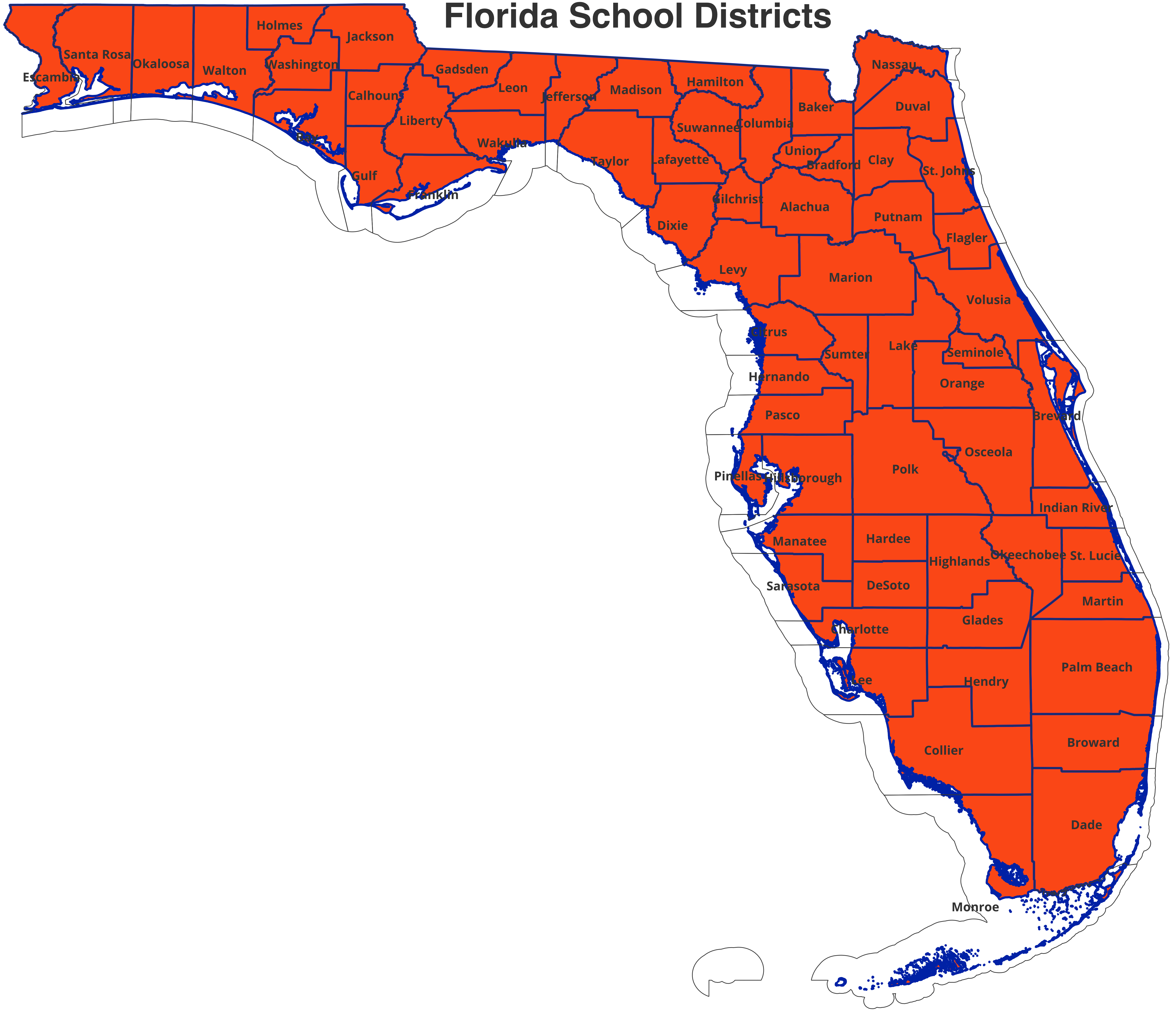
Florida school districts align with the county lines

This is a list of school districts in the schools U.S. state of Florida.

Each of the following parallel the boundary of one of the counties of Florida. These districts are all counted as separate independent governments as per the U.S. Census Bureau, as are junior colleges. Florida has no school systems dependent on another layer of government.

- Alachua County Public Schools
- Baker County School District
- Bay District Schools
- Bradford County School District
- Brevard County Public Schools
- Broward County Public Schools
- Calhoun County School District
- Charlotte County Public Schools
- Citrus County School District
- Clay County Schools
- Collier County District School Board
- Columbia County School District
- DeSoto School District
- Dixie County School District
- Duval County Public Schools
- Escambia County School District
- Flagler County Public Schools
- Franklin County School District (Florida)
- Gadsden County School District
- Gilchrist County School District
- Glades County School District
- Gulf County Schools
- Hamilton County School District
- Hardee County School District
- Hendry County Schools
- Hernando County School Board
- Highlands County Schools
- Hillsborough County Public Schools
- Holmes County School District
- Indian River County School District
- Jackson County School Board
- Jefferson County School District
- Lafayette County School District (Florida)
- Lake County Schools
- Lee County School District
- Leon County Schools
- Levy County School Board
- Liberty County School District
- Madison County Schools
- Manatee County School District
- Marion County Public Schools
- Martin County School District
- Miami-Dade County Public Schools
- Monroe County School District
- Nassau County School District
- Okaloosa County School District
- Okeechobee County School Board
- Orange County Public Schools
- Osceola County School District
- Palm Beach County School District
- Pasco County Schools
- Pinellas County Schools
- Polk County Public Schools
- Putnam County School District (Florida)
- St. Johns County School District
- St. Lucie County School Board
- Santa Rosa County School District
- Sarasota County Public Schools
- Seminole County Public Schools
- Sumter District Schools
- Suwannee County School District
- Taylor County School District (Florida)
- Union County School Board
- Volusia County Schools
- Wakulla County School Board
- Walton County School District (Florida)
- Washington County School District

Non-county school districts (not listed by the U.S. Census):

- Dozier/Okeechobee School District (operates Okeechobee Youth Development Center)

== See also ==
- List of high schools in Florida
- List of charter schools in Florida
