= Milburn Schools =

Coordinates: 38.687239°N 77.314597°W

Millburn Schools
- Number of locations: 15 (2011)
- Parent: Catapult Learning

Milburn Schools is a private school and charter school operator headquartered in Lake Ridge, Prince William County, Virginia, United States, near Woodbridge.

The Milburn education management organization was absorbed into NonPublic Educational Services, which was acquired by Catapult Learning in 2012. The Texas schools appear to have been taken over by the local public school districts. There are two Richard Milburn Academies in Florida, but no indication that they are managed from Virginia. The company continues to provide foreign language training to the United States military.

In 2015, Richard Milburn schools enrolled 1,387 students.

== Schools ==
Richard Milburn High School (Private schools)

- Illinois
  - Chicago Richard Millburn Alternative School closed in August 2012.
- Virginia
  - Lake Ridge (near Woodbridge)

Richard Milburn Academy (Charter schools)

- Florida
  - Bradenton Closed in 2011, after discovery that the school falsified student records.
  - Richard Milburn Academy, Daytona Beach, Florida
  - Richard Milburn Academy (West) DeLand, closed in 2011.
  - Fort Myers Closed after discovery of financial improprieties.
  - Lehigh Acres
    - RMA Lee Alternative High School (LACHS)
- Texas
  - Amarillo school got an accreditation warning in 2014.
  - Beaumont, Texas closed 2010.
  - Corpus Christi
  - Fort Worth
  - Greater Houston
    - Richard Milburn Academy Houston - unincorporated Harris County - The Texas Education Agency (TEA) revoked accreditation on December 28, 2013, due to poor academic and/or financial performance ratings.
  - Greater Houston
    - Richard Milburn Academy Pasadena - unincorporated Harris County - The Texas Education Agency (TEA) is investigating District for falsifying data, enrollment, and violation of IDEA. McQuade and Anderson forced Principal to change information, forced many excellent Principals and teachers to resign to cover fraud.
  - Killeen
  - Lubbock
  - Midland
  - Odessa
- Washington, D.C.
  - Richard Milburn Public Charter School, closed 2002.
