= HGHS =

HGHS may refer to:

- Habiganj Govternment High School, in Habiganj, Bangladesh
- Hamilton Girls' High School, in New Zealand
- Hazel Green High School, in Alabama, United States
- Hazel Grove High School, in Stockport, Greater Manchester, United Kingdom
- Hialeah Gardens High School, in Hialeah Gardens, Florida, United States
- Horace Greeley High School, in Chappaqua, New York, United States
- Hornsby Girls' High School, in Sydney, New South Wales, Australia
