= Goleman =

Goleman is a surname. Notable people with the surname include:

- Barbara Goleman, twentieth century American schoolteacher
- Daniel Goleman (born 1946), internationally known author, psychologist, science journalist, and corporate consultant

== See also ==
- Goldman
