= Connections Academy =

Virtual online school

- Type: For-profit
- Industry: education management organization
- Founded: 2001; 25 years ago
- Founder: Barbara Dreyer
- Headquarters: 10960 Grantchester Way, Columbia, Maryland
- Parent: Pearson Education
- Website: www.connectionsacademy.com

Connections Academy is a for-profit corporate provider of online school products and services to virtual schools for grades K-12, including full-time online school. In the United States the company is noted as Connections Academy, and for students abroad it is known as International Connections Academy. Based in Columbia, Maryland, Connections Academy is part of Pearson's Online and Blended Learning K-12 group. Online schools are an alternative to traditional public schools. Similar to charter schools, they are subsidized by the state. Although they contract with many non-profit schools, they are a for-profit corporation.

== History ==
In the spring of 2001, Sylvan Ventures started a separate business unit to create a virtual school program with its first virtual schools in Wisconsin and Colorado. The company first began providing online school services to two schools in the fall of 2002. In September 2004, Connections Academy was sold to an investor group led by Apollo Management, L.P. The company now operates public schools under management contracts from charter schools or school districts.

A new corporate entity called Connections Education was established in early 2011. In this same year, on September 15, 2011, Pearson, an international learning company, acquired Connections Education for more than $400 million.

Connections Education is currently Pearson's Online & Blended Learning division, which delivers the Connections Academy online public school program and other online learning services called Pearson Connexus to educational institutions and other organizations nationwide. A private online school called International Connections Academy serves students across the globe. In 2019 it was announced that UK-based Harrow school would deliver an online education option leveraging Pearson Connexus.

== Notable alumni ==
- Ashley Argota, actress and singer
- Kiri Baga, figure skater, Minnesota Connections Academy
- Karen Chen, figure skater
- Nathan Chen, figure skater, California Connections Academy
- Ria Cheruvu, child prodigy, Arizona Connections Academy
- Eugenia Cooney, internet personality
- Alysa Liu, figure skater, California Connections Academy
- Grace McCallum, artistic gymnast
- Mirai Nagasu, figure skater, Capistrano Connections Academy
- Eric Sjoberg, figure skater, Capistrano Connections Academy
- Vincent Zhou, figure skater, Capistrano Connections Academy

=== Notable staff ===
- Cheron Brylski, speechwriter, helped establish Louisiana Connections Academy
- Casey J, gospel singer, elementary school math teacher at Georgia Connections Academy
- Frank Riggs, politician, founding board president at Arizona Connections Academy
- Matt Wingard, politician, spokesman for Oregon Connections Academy
