= Stride, Inc. =

For-profit education company

- Type: Publicly held
- Traded as: NYSE: LRN; Russell 2000 Component; S&P 600 component
- Industry: Education
- Founder: Ronald J. Packard
- Headquarters: Reston, Virginia, U.S.
- Area served: International
- Key people: Nathaniel B. Greene, Chairman; Robert E. Knowling, Jr. (Bob Knowling), CEO
- Products: Education software, textbooks, workbooks
- Revenue: ▲$2.04 billion (FY 2024)
- Operating income: $249.6 million (FY 2024)
- Total equity: $1.176 billion (FY 2024)
- Number of employees: 7,800 (FY 2024)
- Website: stridelearning.com

Stride, Inc. (formerly K12 Inc.) is a for-profit education company that provides online and blended education programs. Stride, Inc. is an education management organization (EMO) that provides online education designed as an alternative to traditional "brick and mortar" education for public school students from kindergarten to 12th grade (hence its former name), as well as career learning programs. As of 2012, publicly traded Stride, Inc. was the largest EMO in terms of enrollment.

== History ==
=== Finance ===
Ronald J. Packard, a former banker, founded the company in April 2000. Initial investors in the company included Michael R. Milken and Lowell Milken of education company Knowledge Universe, who, along with the Milken Family Foundation, invested $10 million. Andrew Tisch of the Loews Corporation and Larry Ellison of Oracle Corporation also contributed venture capital. It became a publicly traded company on December 13, 2007.

=== Leadership ===
William Bennett, Secretary of Education under Ronald Reagan was hired as the company's first chairman of the board, serving until 2005. In 2005, the Philadelphia Board of Education called for the termination of a $3M science curriculum contract with K12 after Bennett said,

"if you wanted to reduce crime...you could abort every black baby in the country and your crime rate would go down. That would be an impossible, ridiculous, and morally reprehensible thing to do, but your crime rate would go down."

Bennett subsequently resigned from the K12 board and his part-time position with K12. The contract was not revoked, but was not renewed at the end of the contract term. Founder Packard resigned in 2014 to start Pansophic Learning.

== Offerings ==
=== Education management ===
Stride, Inc. is a for-profit education management organization (EMO). In this sector, Stride does not operate physical schools, but provides online curriculum to homeschooled children and other schools. Stride was the largest EMO in the US in 2011–2012. Stride's for-profit rival EdisonLearning has also moved away from physical schoolhouses to virtual offerings.

Stride offers its online curriculum at three levels:

- To states and districts as a homeschooling alternative to brick-and-mortar schools
- To school districts as a supplement to classroom teaching
- To parents individually as a private, online, homeschooling alternative

In 2015, 526 virtual schools in the United States enrolled 278,511 students. During the pandemic, enrollment in virtual schools nearly doubled. In the 2019–2020 school year, there were 477 virtual schools with 332,379 students in the U.S. In the 2021–2022 school year, there were 726 virtual schools in the U.S. enrolling 643,930 students.

=== Charter management ===
Stride competes with non-profit educational organizations known as charter management organizations (CMOs) that typically run brick-and-mortar schools. Other large non-profits are Imagine Schools (55 schools), KIPP (209 schools), and Cosmos. Multi-state EMOs and CMOs control about a third of the charter school market. K12 provides to online non-profit CMOs including Agora and Insight in Pennsylvania. The company manages state-funded virtual charter schools and hybrid schools in twenty-nine U.S. states and the District of Columbia. In 2015, Stride was CMO (and charter holder) for schools enrolling 44,559 students.

== Curriculum ==
Stride's product line includes courses for pre-K, elementary, middle, and high school grades, online learning platforms, and educational software. All courses provided by Stride Inc. are delivered through Brightspace, a D2L platform.

The K-8 curriculum includes core subject areas: math, science, language arts, history, art, music, and world languages. The majority of lessons in the early grades are offline using textbooks, printed materials, and hands-on activities. The learning coach (typically a parent or guardian) is expected to spend three to five hours each day monitoring students' progress, logging attendance, and facilitating lessons. Short answer or multiple choice assessments are given at the end of most lessons in K-8 and are administered and recorded by the learning coach.

At the high school level (grades 9–12), students complete all coursework online. Less parental involvement is expected. In high school, teachers monitor student's progress and grade tests and assignments. In addition to core and comprehensive courses, students can choose remedial, Honors, Credit Recovery and Advanced Placement options. Unlike in the K-8 grades, high school courses take place mostly online. Students attend live online classes and have more communication with teachers, via e-mail, phone, and online conferences.

In all cases, the school assigns a state-certified teacher to assist the coach and student. The cost to a sponsoring agency depends on the teacher-student ratio selected. Stride offered the Commonwealth of Virginia three plans: a teacher-student ratio of forty, fifty, or sixty to one. Teacher interaction is accomplished through virtual classroom environments using Newrow, a virtual classroom conferencing system by Kaltura, telephone, and face-to-face meetings and events. In hybrid schools, students complete the same curriculum but attend a physical building and participate in classes with other students and teachers.

== Branding ==
Stride, Inc. offers itself through a variety of brands.

=== State and district sponsored homeschooling ===
Stride develops identities for specific opportunities. In Union County, Tennessee, it has operated Tennessee Virtual Academy since 2011. In Pennsylvania, it operates Insight Pennsylvania Cyber Charter School.

Stride previously operated Hoosier Academy Virtual Charter School, an online K–12 charter school in Indiana started in 2009 that enrolled 3,681 students in the 2015–2016 school year. The school suffered from six successive years of "F" ratings, which nearly resulted in its closure in 2016. Later, the school was closed on June 30, 2018, after the school board voted not to renew the charter.

=== Private online K–12 schools ===
Stride, Inc. operates three online private schools: K12 Private Academy, George Washington University Online High School, and the Keystone School. In 2011, The George Washington University partnered with Stride to offer a full-time online private school accredited by the Middle States Association of Colleges and Schools commissions on Elementary and Secondary Schools.

=== Career learning ===
Stride, Inc. offers career and technical education programs at public schools, called Destinations Career Academies and Programs to students in grades 9–12.

In 2020, Stride expanded into the adult learning space with the acquisition of data science and software engineering bootcamp Galvanize. With the companies rebrand in November 2020, it was announced that they would acquire Tech Elevator, a computer coding bootcamp, and MedCerts, an online healthcare career training program.

=== Learning Solutions ===
In April 2014, Stride, Inc. established wholly owned subsidiary, Fuel Education. Fuel Education operated as a separate legal entity from Stride, Inc., and houses different personalized learning programs. The subsidiary has since rebranded as Learning Solutions.

== School assessment ==
The National Education Policy Center regularly conducts studies of the performance of Stride and other for-profit virtual schools including Connections Academy (a subsidiary of Pearson Education). A study at Western Michigan University and the National Education Policy Center found that only a third of K12's schools achieved Adequate Yearly Progress (AYP), which is required for public schools by the federal No Child Left Behind (NCLB) legislation. According to The New York Times, "By almost every educational measure, the Agora Cyber Charter School [a school run by K12] is failing." In Pennsylvania, 42% of Agora students tested at grade level or better in math, compared with 75% of students statewide. 52% of Agora students tested at grade level or better in reading, compared with 72% statewide. Nonetheless, Agora brought K12 $72 million in the 2011 school year – more than 10% of K12's revenue. Agora terminated its contract with K12 in 2014. Proponents argue that such statistics are undermined by the fact that a significant proportion of newly enrolled students begin several grade levels behind because of a failure of brick and mortar schools. Education reformers such as United States Secretary of Education Arne Duncan, have further stated that AYP is not an accurate measure of a school's performance and estimated that under NCLB, as many as "82 percent of America's schools could be labeled 'failing'".

From 2010 through 2016, Hoosier Academy Virtual Charter School received six successive "F" grades from the Indiana Department of Education.

A paper by Yale students found "With no exceptions, students enrolled in K12 schools performed worse in math than their district and state counterparts. With only one exception, they performed worse in English and language arts"

The press and politicians have been equally critical. A 2012 PolitiFact.com article noted K12's poor performance in Tennessee. The New York Times investigated K12 and concluded that the company squeezes profits from public school funding by raising enrollment, increasing teacher workload, and lowering standards. The Washington Post raised similar issues.

K12 defends its position, describing its student base as "at risk" to begin with.

== Lobbying efforts ==
The New York Times wrote that K12's profits are used to pay for advertising and lobbying state officials. K12 spent $26.5M on advertising in 2010 and the company and its employees contributed nearly $500,000 to state political candidates from 2004 to 2010. K12 has contributed money to organizations like Pennsylvania Families for Public Cyber Schools, which lobbied for online schools. In Ohio, an organization founded by a K12 official hired temp agency workers to demonstrate with signs against state representative Steven Dryer, who challenged their funding.

== Ransomware attacks ==
In November, 2020, Stride was attacked by Ryuk ransomware criminals, rendering some of Stride's records inaccessible and leading to the threatened release of students' personal information. The company paid an undisclosed ransom amount, saying, "Based on the specific characteristics of the case, and the guidance we have received about the attack and the threat actor, we believe the payment was a reasonable measure to take in order to prevent misuse of any information the attacker obtained".

In May, 2026, Stride's schools were affected by the 2026 Canvas data breach incident.

== See also ==
- Virtual school
- Charter schools in the United States
- Connections Academy
