= Country Club, Florida =

- Census-designated place
- Location in Miami-Dade County and the state of Florida

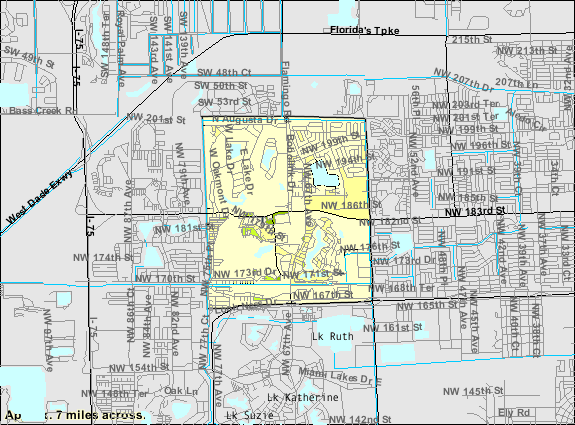
- U.S. Census Bureau map showing CDP boundaries
- Coordinates: 25°56′27″N 80°18′37″W
- Country: United States
- State: Florida
- County: Miami-Dade

Area
  - Total: 4.47 sq mi (11.58 km^{2})
  - Land: 4.18 sq mi (10.82 km^{2})
  - Water: 0.29 sq mi (0.76 km^{2})
- Elevation: 7 ft (2.1 m)

Population (2020)
  - Total: 49,967
  - Density: 11,961/sq mi (4,618.1/km^{2})
- Time zone: UTC-5 (Eastern (EST))
  - Summer (DST): UTC-4 (EDT)
- ZIP Code: 33015 (Hialeah)
- Area codes: 305, 786, 645
- FIPS code: 12-14895
- GNIS feature ID: 2402799

Country Club is a suburban census-designated place located in northwest Miami-Dade County, Florida, United States. It is located in the Miami metropolitan area of South Florida. The CDP is named after the Country Club of Miami, which was established in 1961 in what was then an unpopulated and undeveloped section of the county. The population was 49,967 at the 2020 census, up from 3,408 in 1990.

== Geography ==
Country Club is located 21 miles (34 km) northwest of downtown Miami. Its northern border is the Broward County line. It is bordered by the town of Miami Lakes to the south, unincorporated Palm Springs North to the west, and the city of Miramar to the north.

Florida State Road 826, the Palmetto Expressway, runs along the southern edge of the community, leading east 6 miles (10 km) to Florida's Turnpike and Interstate 95, and south 17 miles (27 km) to U.S. Route 1 at Pinecrest.

According to the United States Census Bureau, the Country Club CDP has an approximate area of 4.5 square miles (12 km^{2}). 4.2 square miles (11 km^{2}) of it are land and 0.3 square miles (0.8 km^{2}) of it (6.60%) are water.

== Demographics ==
Historical population
Census	Pop.	Note	%±
1990	3,408		—
2000	36,310		965.4%
2010	47,105		29.7%
2020	49,967		6.1%
U.S. Decennial Census

=== Racial and ethnic composition ===
Country Club CDP, Florida – Racial and ethnic composition Note: the US Census treats Hispanic/Latino as an ethnic category. This table excludes Latinos from the racial categories and assigns them to a separate category. Hispanics/Latinos may be of any race.
Race / Ethnicity (NH = Non-Hispanic)	Pop 2010	Pop 2020	% 2010	% 2020
White (NH)	3,783	2,910	8.03%	5.82%
Black or African American (NH)	4,946	2,880	10.50%	5.76%
Native American or Alaska Native (NH)	19	20	0.04%	0.04%
Asian (NH)	868	656	1.84%	1.31%
Pacific Islander or Native Hawaiian (NH)	2	0	0.00%	0.00%
Some other race (NH)	93	222	0.20%	0.44%
Mixed race or Multiracial (NH)	261	419	0.55%	0.84%
Hispanic or Latino (any race)	37,133	42,860	78.83%	85.78%
Total	47,105	49,967	100.00%	100.00%

=== 2020 census ===
As of the 2020 census, Country Club had a population of 49,967. The median age was 38.1 years. 21.3% of residents were under the age of 18 and 12.8% of residents were 65 years of age or older. For every 100 females there were 87.4 males, and for every 100 females age 18 and over there were 83.0 males age 18 and over.

100.0% of residents lived in urban areas, while 0.0% lived in rural areas.

There were 17,505 households in Country Club, of which 38.9% had children under the age of 18 living in them. Of all households, 42.5% were married-couple households, 14.9% were households with a male householder and no spouse or partner present, and 32.2% were households with a female householder and no spouse or partner present. About 17.7% of all households were made up of individuals and 5.6% had someone living alone who was 65 years of age or older.

There were 18,198 housing units, of which 3.8% were vacant. The homeowner vacancy rate was 0.7% and the rental vacancy rate was 4.3%.

Racial composition as of the 2020 census
Race	Number	Percent
White	11,778	23.6%
Black or African American	3,380	6.8%
American Indian and Alaska Native	144	0.3%
Asian	704	1.4%
Native Hawaiian and Other Pacific Islander	3	0.0%
Some other race	8,710	17.4%
Two or more races	25,248	50.5%
Hispanic or Latino (of any race)	42,860	85.8%

=== 2010 census ===
As of the 2010 United States census, there were 47,105 people, 13,971 households, and 10,352 families residing in the CDP.

=== 2000 census ===
As of the census of 2000, there were 36,310 people, 12,917 households, and 9,338 families residing in the CDP. The population density was 8,420.5 inhabitants per square mile (3,251.2/km^{2}). There were 13,782 housing units at an average density of 3,196.1 per square mile (1,234.0/km^{2}). The racial makeup of the CDP was 63.54% White (15.5% were Non-Hispanic White), 22.01% African American, 0.23% Native American, 2.21% Asian, 0.06% Pacific Islander, 7.25% from other races, and 4.70% from two or more races. Hispanic or Latino of any race were 60.32% of the population.

There were 12,917 households, out of which 41.3% had children under the age of 18 living with them, 48.3% were married couples living together, 18.2% had a female householder with no husband present, and 27.7% were non-families. 19.9% of all households were made up of individuals, and 2.5% had someone living alone who was 65 years of age or older. The average household size was 2.80 and the average family size was 3.23.

In the region the population was spread out, with 27.2% under the age of 18, 10.8% from 18 to 24, 38.4% from 25 to 44, 17.5% from 45 to 64, and 6.2% who were 65 years of age or older. The median age was 30 years. For every 100 females, there were 90.3 males. For every 100 females age 18 and over, there were 85.1 males.

The median income for a household in the region was $56,272, and the median income for a family was $56,353. Males had a median income of $31,018 versus $24,901 for females. The per capita income for the CDP was $17,999. About 10.9% of families and 13.1% of the population were below the poverty line, including 15.7% of those under age 18 and 15.6% of those age 65 or over.

As of 2000, speakers of Spanish as a first language accounted for 64.02% of residents, while English made up 30.74%, French Creole was at 2.20%, French was at 0.92%, and Brazilian Portuguese at 0.53% of the population.

== Education ==
Miami-Dade County Public Schools serves Country Club.

- American Senior High School
- Country Club Middle School
- Joella C. Good Elementary School

In 2009 sections of Country Club were rezoned to Barbara Goleman High School in Miami Lakes.

Dade Christian School (K-12) is in Country Club.

== Parks and recreation ==
- Country Village Park
- Country Club Villas Park
- Willis D. Harding Park
- North Pointe Community Center
