= Harold Baquet =

American photographer and artist

Harold Francis Baquet
- Born: 23 July 1958; New Orleans, Louisiana, U.S
- Died: 18 June 2015 (aged 56)
- Occupation: Photographer

Harold Francis Baquet (July 23, 1958 – June 18, 2015) was an American photographer and artist who built a career documenting African American political and daily life in his native city. A descendant of seven generations of Creole residents, he grew up surrounded by the artistic, musical and crafts communities of New Orleans.

== Early life and education ==
Harold Baquet was the son of the late Audrey Ganier Nicholas Baquet and Arsene Baquet. He was born in New Orleans, Louisiana at Charity Hospital, the only child in this second marriage for both his parents. His half-brothers and sisters include Velva Nicholas Flot, Albert ‘Blainey’ Nicholas, Arsene Baquet (deceased), Larry Baquet (deceased) and Ruby Baquet (deceased). He grew up in the Seventh Ward, living most of his early years at the corner of North Miro and Havana Streets. He graduated from St. Augustine High School and served in the U.S. Air Force Reserves. He served as an electrician's apprentice for IBEW Local until he decided to pursue a career in photography full-time, following in the steps of the Creole photographer Arthur P. Bedou, whom he greatly admired.

== Career ==
Baquet's early photographic career revolved around a series of professional and freelance assignments with local African American papers, including the Spectator, the Louisiana Weekly, the New Orleans Tribune and Black Data News. He also took freelance assignments with local daily newspapers, such as the Times Picayune, Reuters and the Associated Press. In 1984 he was hired to be a staff photographer with the Administration of the late Mayor Ernest N. Morial, the city's first black Mayor and an individual who knew his father Arsene as a shoe repairman from the 7th ward. It was during this public service to the City of New Orleans that Baquet began documenting the daily life of residents who lived in New Orleans numerous housing developments, the city's burgeoning Vietnamese community, as well as the changing role of African Americans, and the Creole sub-culture, within the every-day framework of the city.

=== Post-city hall ===
In 1989, Baquet accepted employment at Loyola University New Orleans as their photographer, a position he held for more than 25 years and for which he received numerous accolades.

=== Hurricane Katrina ===
Baquet, his wife, Cheron Brylski, and his mother-in-law remained at their Uptown home during Hurricane Katrina and immediately following its aftermath, when the remaining residents came to realize the levees were failing. He was in a unique position to photograph what remained of the city, and was often interviewed on his post-storm experiences by the national media. He told CNN in 2010, "No, things will never be exactly the same. Some things are better."

== Personal life ==
He married Denise White Baquet and had one son, Harold F. Baquet Jr., who died from multiple illnesses at the age of three in 1987. After a divorce in 1986, Baquet remained single until 1995, when he married Cheron Brylski. They established a home, business and studio in Uptown New Orleans, which continues to be identified as Maison Baquet, the home of his personal archives. Baquet was diagnosed with Stage 4 colon cancer in 2008 and would die from the disease after a seven-year battle. A devout Catholic, he credited this experience with deepening his faith.

== Legacy ==
Baquet's extensive print, negative and slide collection is now housed at the Historic New Orleans Collection for public use and inspection. Smaller collections remain at Loyola University and the Jazz and Heritage Foundation.

== Books ==
- In the Blink of an Eye (2011)
