= Albert Almora =

American baseball player (born 1994)

Albert Almora Jr.
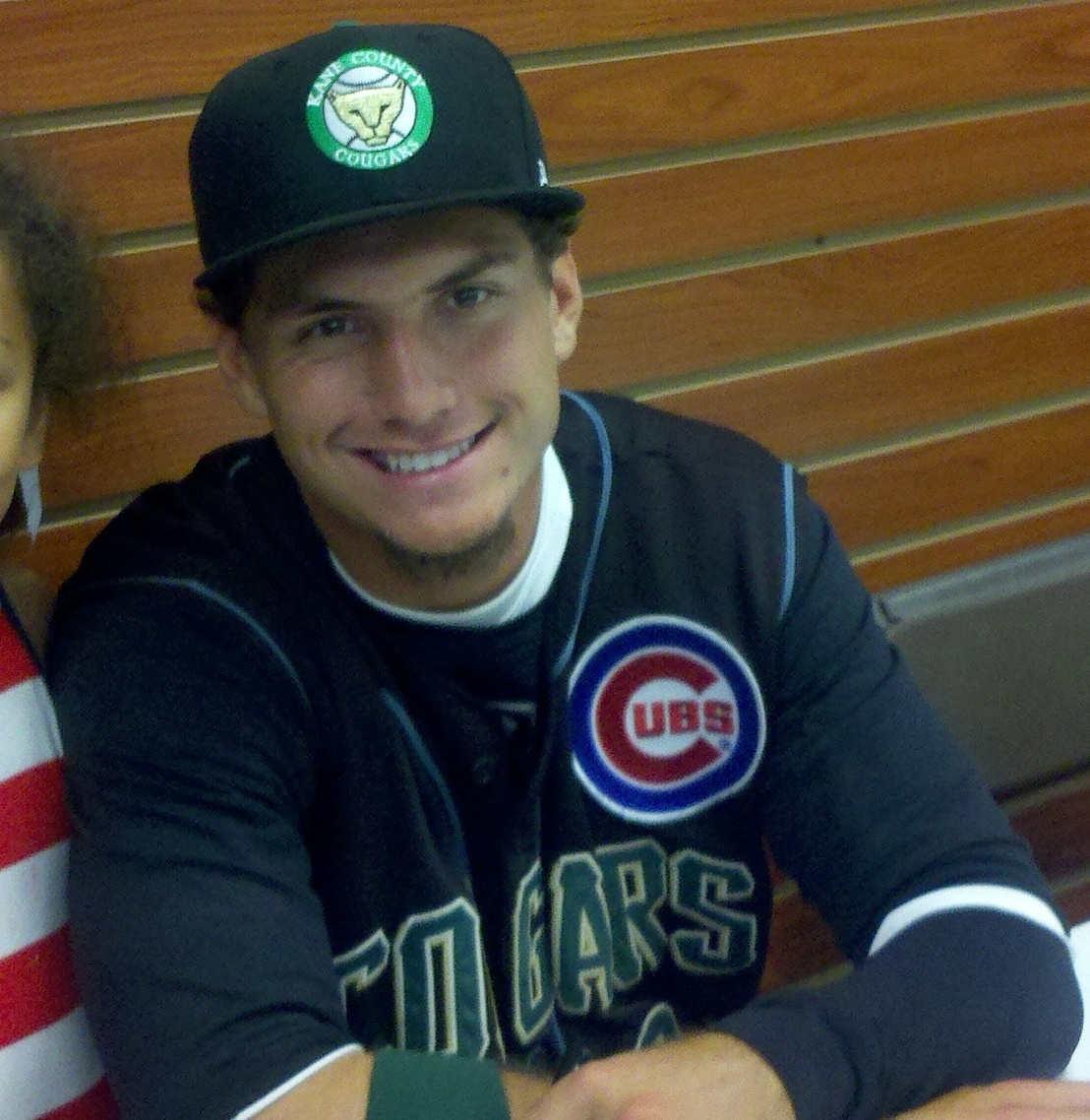
- Almora in 2013

Free agent
- Center fielder
- Born: Reinaldo Albert Almora Jr. April 16, 1994 (age 32); Hialeah Gardens, Florida, U.S.
- Bats: Right Throws: Right

MLB debut
- June 7, 2016, for the Chicago Cubs

MLB statistics (through 2022 season)
- Batting average: .259
- Home runs: 33
- Runs batted in: 163
- Stats at Baseball Reference

Teams
- Chicago Cubs (2016–2020); New York Mets (2021); Cincinnati Reds (2022)

Career highlights and awards
- World Series champion (2016)
Medals
Men's baseball
Representing United States
Pan American Games
Silver medal – second place	2015 Toronto	Team

Reinaldo Albert Almora Jr. (born April 16, 1994) is an American professional baseball center fielder who is a free agent. He has previously played in Major League Baseball (MLB) for the Chicago Cubs, New York Mets, and Cincinnati Reds. He made his MLB debut in 2016.

== Amateur career ==
Almora attended Mater Academy Charter School in Hialeah Gardens, Florida. In 2011, Almora was named USA Baseball's Athlete of the Year after leading the 18 and under team to a 9–0 record and being named the tournament MVP. He played on six national teams while in high school, tying a record. He won the USA Baseball Richard W. "Dick" Case Player of the Year Award in 2011. He committed to play college baseball at the University of Miami.

== Professional career ==
=== Chicago Cubs ===
The Chicago Cubs selected Almora in the first round, with the sixth overall selection, in the 2012 MLB draft out of Mater Academy Charter School. He signed with the Cubs, receiving a $3.9 million signing bonus. MLB.com ranked Almora as the second-best prospect in the Cubs organization in 2013, and the 39th ranked prospect in all of baseball.

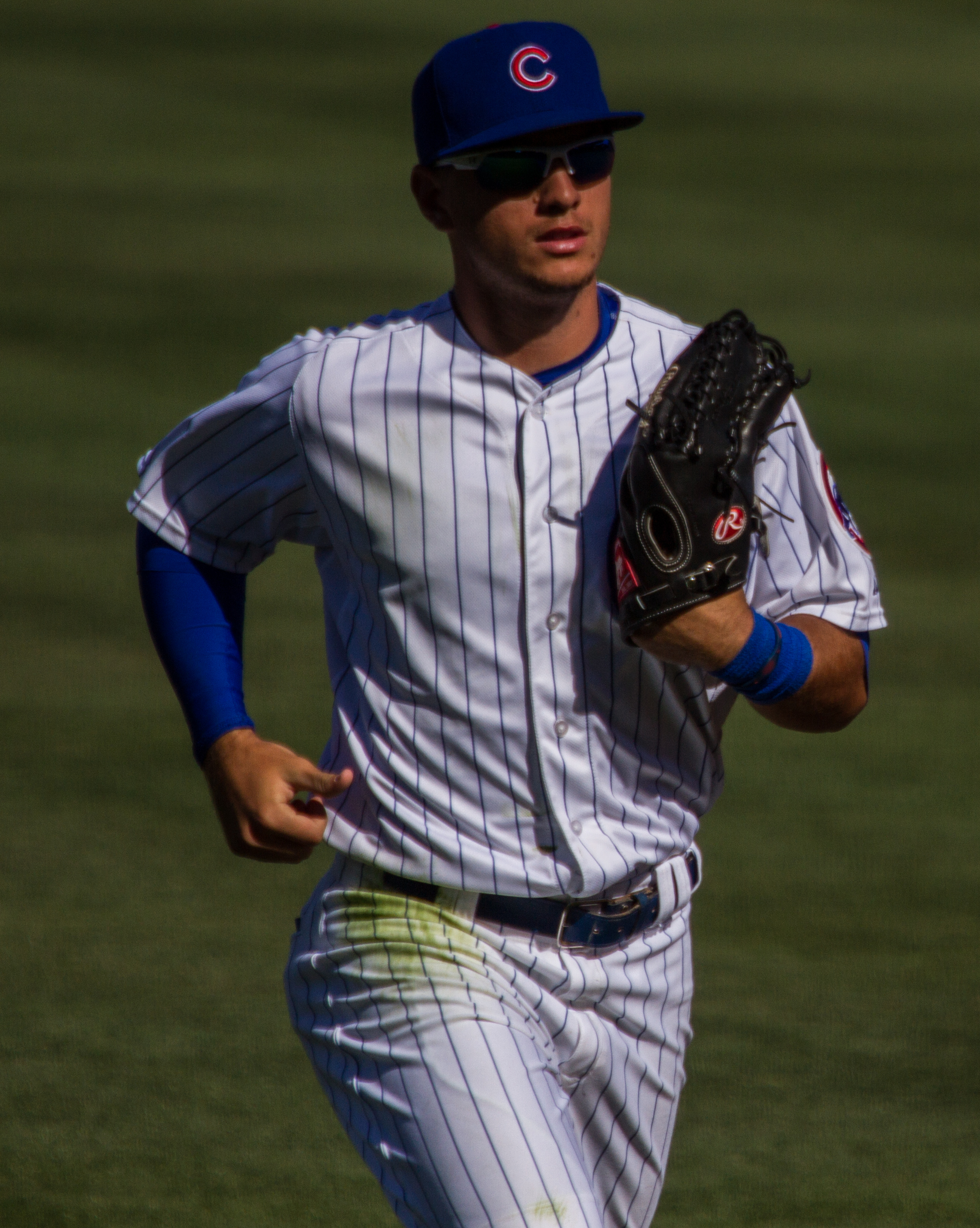
Almora with the Chicago Cubs during spring training in 2014

Almora spent 2012 with both the Arizona League Cubs and Boise Hawks, batting .321 with two home runs and 19 RBIs in 33 games. He played for the Kane County Cougars in 2013. He had a .329 batting average in 61 games played, as he missed time due to injury. After the 2013 season, the Cubs assigned Almora to the Arizona Fall League to gain more experience. In 2014, he played for the Daytona Cubs and Tennessee Smokies where he slashed .270/.291/.392 with 9 home runs and 60 RBIs in 125 games.

Almora spent 2015 back with the Smokies where he batted .272 with six home runs and 46 RBIs in 106 games. He began 2016 with the Iowa Cubs. At Iowa prior to being called up, he was batting .318 in 54 games.

==== 2016 ====
Almora was promoted to the Cubs on June 7, 2016, when Jorge Soler was placed on the disabled list. He made his first MLB career start in left field the next day against the Philadelphia Phillies and on his first fielding opportunity, he threw out a runner at home to complete a double play. The following day, he got his first major league hit.

On November 2, 2016, in Game 7 of the 2016 World Series, Almora took over as a pinch runner for Kyle Schwarber, the Cubs' designated hitter who opened the top of the 10th inning with a lead-off single to right field. Almora advanced to second base on a rare tag-up play from first base thanks to a deep fly ball out hit by Kris Bryant. After Cleveland Indians pitcher Bryan Shaw intentionally walked Cubs first baseman Anthony Rizzo, Almora scored the go-ahead 7th run for the Cubs off of a double by Ben Zobrist. The Cubs went on to win the game 8–7, earning their first World Series victory since 1908 thanks in part to Almora's baserunning skill.

==== 2017 ====
In 132 games, Almora finished the season with a .298 batting average, eight home runs, and 46 RBIs. He also changed the name on the back of his jersey from 'Almora Jr.' to just 'Almora.'

==== 2018 ====
On April 22, in an away game against the Colorado Rockies, Almora made three leaping catches in center field; in the first, second and ninth innings of the Cubs' 9–7 win. Almora finished his 2018 campaign batting .286 with 5 home runs and 41 RBIs in 152 games. He was the final out of the 2018 NL Wild Card Game against Colorado, struck out by Scott Oberg to end the 13 inning, 2–1 Rockies victory.

==== 2019 ====
Almora opened the 2019 season on Chicago's 25-man roster.

During a May series against the Houston Astros, Almora hit a foul ball that struck the head of a young fan in the stands. After the line drive struck the girl, Almora quickly reacted by placing his hands on his head and even falling to his knees. The girl was rapidly evacuated to the hospital and eventually diagnosed with a fractured skull. When interviewed by reporters, Almora appeared on the verge of crying when asked about the incident. Following the incident, every MLB stadium expanded their foul line netting to better protect fans from foul balls.

==== 2020 ====
Almora opened the 2020 season on Chicago's 26-man Opening Day roster but was optioned to the alternate training site, located in South Bend, Indiana. Before being sent down, Almora was platooning with Ian Happ, who the Cubs named their starting center fielder. Almora batted .167 with five hits in 30 at-bats. He was optioned when the Cubs received Cameron Maybin from the Detroit Tigers. On December 2, Almora was non-tendered by the Cubs.

=== New York Mets ===
On February 10, 2021, Almora signed a one-year, $1.25 million contract with the New York Mets. On May 12, Almora was placed on the 10-day injured list after running full speed into the outfield wall at Citi Field the night before. In 52 at-bats for the Mets, Almora batted .115 with no home runs or RBI. On September 26, 2021, Almora was designated for assignment by the Mets. On October 7, he elected free agency.

=== Cincinnati Reds ===
On March 20, 2022, the Cincinnati Reds signed Almora to a minor league contract with an invite to spring training. He was assigned to the Triple-A Louisville Bats to begin the year.

On May 4, 2022, Almora was selected to the active roster. On May 23, Almora was removed from the 40-man roster and returned to Triple-A Louisville, but was re-selected to the active roster hours later. On June 4, Almora hit a grand slam, the second of his career, off of Jordan Weems of the Washington Nationals. In 64 games for the Reds, he batted .223/.282/.349 with 5 home runs and 29 RBI. On September 9, Almora was designated for assignment by Cincinnati, and released by the team on September 12.

=== Arizona Diamondbacks ===
On February 23, 2024, Almora signed a minor league contract with the Arizona Diamondbacks. In 127 appearances for the Triple-A Reno Aces, he batted .292/.349/.439 with 9 home runs, 69 RBI, and 20 stolen bases. Almora elected free agency following the season on November 4.

=== Miami Marlins ===
On January 27, 2025, Almora signed a minor league contract with the Miami Marlins. In 44 appearances for the Triple-A Jacksonville Jumbo Shrimp, he batted .240/.289/.315 with one home run, 15 RBI, and four stolen bases. Almora was released by the Marlins organization on June 19.

=== Arizona Diamondbacks (second stint) ===
On June 26, 2025, Almora signed a minor league contract with the Arizona Diamondbacks. In 35 appearances for the Triple-A Reno Aces, he batted .303/.378/.476 with four home runs, 26 RBI, and five stolen bases. Almora was released by the Diamondbacks organization on September 7.

== Personal life ==
Almora's father, Albert Sr., played baseball in Cuba before he defected to the United States. Almora began training with his father when he was three years old. Albert is so close to Manny Machado that Almora considers him to be his cousin, though they are not related by blood. Machado was quoted as saying that he would love to play with Almora and win a World Series together, a dream they had as kids.

Almora married former Philadelphia 76ers and Philadelphia Flyers dancer Krystal Gregorio on July 21, 2016. Their first child, a son, was born in August 2016.

Almora chose "Tico" as his nickname for the Players Weekend during the 2017 and 2018 seasons. He says that the nickname was given to him as a child for his rowdy nature.
