= Hebrew Language Academy Charter School =

School in Brooklyn, U.S.

Coordinates: 40.61854°N 73.94189°W

Information
- School type: Charter school
- Established: 2009; 17 years ago
- Grades: K-8

Hebrew Language Academy Charter School is a public K-8 Charter school in Brooklyn, New York. HLA is an intentionally diverse charter school which teaches the Modern Hebrew language. Like all public schools HLA does not provide religious instruction and will neither encourage nor prohibit religious devotion. The enrollment is 35% black, 6% Hispanic, 55% white, and 4% other.

== History ==
The school is the latest development in a trend to establish publicly funded Hebrew language and culture charter schools, the first of which was the Ben Gamla Charter School, which opened in Hollywood, Florida in 2007. Whereas Ben Gamla ignited controversy over church-state issues, the Hebrew Language Academy will focus on the modern Hebrew language and Jewish cultures throughout the world similar to other dual-language schools in New York City that organize studies through the prism of particular languages and cultures.

The New York State Board of Regents approved the application for the Hebrew Language Academy Charter School on January 13, 2009.

== See also ==
- Ben Gamla Charter School
- Language/culture based charter school
