= Richard Milburn Academy =

Charter schools in Florida

Location
- 1031 Mason Avenue; Daytona Beach, Florida; 29.2184781°N 81.0502549°W

Information
- Funding type: Charter
- Established: 1975
- Founder: Richard A. Grim
- NCES School ID: 120192005749
- Faculty: 14
- Grades: 9-12
- Enrollment: 361 (2015)
- Campus type: strip shopping center
- Website: rmaflorida.org

Richard Milburn Academy of Florida, Inc.
- Tax ID no.: 04-3513332
- Revenue: $2,723,212 (2015)

Richard Milburn Academy is a charter high school in Florida and Texas. It's in Amarillo, Corpus Christi, Fort Worth, Houston, Killeen, Lubbock, Midland, Odessa, and Pasadena, Texas.

== History ==
Recognizing the need to serve soldiers who required instruction in basic skills, GED training and certification, LTC Richard A. Grim founded the predecessor of Richard Milburn High School (RMHS) in 1975 at the Marine Corps Development and Education Command at Quantico, Virginia. Subsequent to initial approval by the Virginia State Department of Education and the Veterans Administration, the Southern Association of Colleges and Schools (SACS) accredited RMHS in 1980. Currently, RMHS annually serves more than 50,000 students in programs ranging from elementary remediation to adult foreign language training. In the high school, 85% of RMHS students have experienced success by making acceptable progress toward achieving individual academic and life/career skills goals. RMHS once provided programs to 37 school districts in 7 states (Massachusetts, New Hampshire, Indiana, Illinois, North Carolina, Florida, and Virginia).

Richard Milburn Academy of Florida was established in 2005 as a charter school under the management of education management organization Milburn Schools. Milburn was designed to serve at-risk students.

== The RMA Program ==
The RMA program provides non-traditional educational programs for students to earn high school diplomas, either from RMA or from the local school district, and to gain employment experience. RMA offers apprenticeships, courses in academic core curriculum and careerl1ife skills. Flexible scheduling allows RMA students to maximize opportunities to work and earn high school credits. Typically, RMA accommodates student employment schedules by repeating academic courses during morning, afternoon, or evening sessions.
