= Somerset Academy Inc. =

Charter school management organization

Somerset Canyons Edging Academy
- Formation: January 1998; 28 years ago
- Founder: Fernando Zulueta
- Founded at: Miramar, Florida
- Type: charter management organization
- Tax ID no.: 31-1569428
- Headquarters: Pembroke Pines, Florida
- President: Bernado Montero
- Key people: Todd German Chairman of the Board
- Main organ: Board of Directors
- Revenue: $251,355,560 (2020)
- Expenses: $249,353,491 (2020)
- Staff: 4,521 (2020)
- Volunteers: 6,796 (2020)
- Website: www.somersetacademyschools.com

Somerset Academy Inc. is a non-profit charter management organization based in Pembroke Pines, Florida. It has a network of 80 schools in Florida, Nevada, Texas, Arizona and Spain. In 2015, Somerset operated charter schools enrolling 14,951 students on a hybrid basis. Somerset partners with Academica, a for-profit education management organization.

== History ==
Fernando Zulueta created a Miramar, Florida housing development in 1997 that needed a local school for residents. He recruited Ruth Jacoby, who had over twenty years experience with Miami-Dade County Public Schools to be the first principal for Somerset Neighborhood School, a non-profit charter school authorized by the Florida Legislature in 1996. Zuluete incorporated Academica in 1999 as a For-profit education provider of services to charter schools. Somerset Academies rely on Academica for curriculum, tests, facilities, security, staff recruitment, budgeting, accounting and other services. The company assisted Somerset in launching additional charter schools by writing charter school applications, establishing corporate structures, providing experts to advocate and lobby government agencies, managing public relations & marketing, and ensuring regulatory compliance. The school was founded in 1997. It began with 50 students from Kindergarten through 5th grade.

== Operations ==
In 2017, a Florida state appeals court approved Somerset's application to open two schools in Indian River County after rejection by the Indian River County School District.

Also in 2017, the Florida Department of Education took financial control of the Jefferson County, Florida Public School District due to missing money, low school grades and questionable staffing decisions. Control was delegated to Somerset Academy Inc. which operated a charter school in Monticello, Florida. Jefferson County is the only Florida public school district to ever be controlled by a charter school. The FDOE returned control to the local school board on February 9, 2022, but the district must submit a monthly budget report to the state for one year and maintain a minimum 5% unassigned fund balance.

== Awards and rankings ==
Somerset Arts Conservatory in Pembroke Pines, Florida was ranked the 23rd best high school in Florida for 2021. Advanced Placement participation is 94%.

Somerset Academy Charter High in Pembroke Pines, Florida was ranked the 50th best high school in Florida for 2021.

Somerset Academy Charter High School in Homestead, Florida was ranked the 109th best high school in Florida for 2021.

Somerset Academy Miramar High School was ranked the 168th best high school in Florida for 2021.

Somerset Academy Canyons High School in Boynton Beach, Florida was ranked the 185th best high school in Florida for 2021.

Somerset Academy South Homestead was ranked the 186th best high school in Florida for 2021.

Somerset Preparatory Academy Charter High at North Lauderdale was ranked the 233rd best high school in Florida for 2021.

Somerset College Preparatory Academy in Port Saint Lucie, Florida was ranked the 240th best high school in Florida for 2021.

Somerset Academy Sky Pointe in Las Vegas, Nevada was ranked the 50th best high school in Nevada for 2021.

Somerset Academy Losee in North Las Vegas, Nevada was ranked the 65th best high school in Nevada for 2021.
