= Imagine Schools =

American charter school management organization

Imagine Schools Inc.
- Predecessor: Chancellor Beacon
- Formation: 1996; 30 years ago
- Founder: Dennis Bakke
- Type: 501(3)(c) (since 2015)
- Tax ID no.: 04-3466383
- Location: Arlington, Virginia
- Services: Charter management organization
- Budget: 371,000,000 (2024)
- Revenue: $50,635,506 (2015)
- Website: www.imagineschools.org
- 33,420 students 3,069 teachers 55 schools(2015)

Imagine Schools is a charter management organization in the United States, operating 55 schools in 9 states. They are K-8, for the most part. In 2015, Imagine schools had enrolled 29,812 students.

Imagine Schools was founded by Dennis and Eileen Bakke with $155 million of the fortune Dennis had earned as chief executive officer of AES Corporation, a global energy provider which he co-founded in 1981.

== History ==
Beacon Education Management was founded in 1996. In June 2004, Imagine Schools Inc., led by Dennis Bakke, acquired Chancellor Beacon Academies, adding over 70 charter schools and nearly 20,000 students to its management. Bakke and his wife, Eileen, co-founded Imagine Schools in January 2004.

By 2008, Imagine had grown to 56 schools.

In 2015, Imagine Schools was ordered to pay a $1 million judgment as part of a self-dealing scheme. As part of a complex arrangement, Imagine Schools had negotiated above market rents for its facilities, which it actually owned through a subsidiary.

== Peer group ==
In 2015, Imagine adopted non-profit tax status. Similar organizations are known as charter management organizations (CMOs). Other large non-profits are KIPP (209 schools) and Cosmos.

Similar services are provided by for-profit entities known as education management organizations (EMOs). K12 was the largest in the US in 2011–2012. K12 does not manage any brick-and-mortar schools, instead delivering schooling on line.
