= Hialeah Gardens High School =

Location
- 11700 Hialeah Gardens Boulevard; Hialeah Gardens, Florida 33018; United States
- 25.87916°N 80.352892°W

Information
- School type: Public, high school
- Motto: We are...Gladiators!
- School district: Miami-Dade County Public Schools
- Principal: Maritza D. Jimenez
- Teaching staff: 110.00 FTEs
- Grades: 9–12
- Enrollment: 3,046 (2023-2024)
- Student to teacher ratio: 27.69
- Campus type: Suburban
- Colors: Hunter green White; Silver; Black
- Mascot: The Gladiators
- Website: hghsgladiators.com

Hialeah Gardens High School is a public high school in Hialeah Gardens, Florida, United States, which opened its doors in August 2009. It is part of the Miami-Dade County Public Schools system. The school principal is Maritza D. Jimenez.

As of the 2014–15 school year, the school had an enrollment of 3,089 students and 115 classroom teachers (on an FTE basis), for a student-teacher ratio of 26.9:1. There were 2,208 students (71.5% of enrollment) eligible for free lunch and 311 (10.1% of students) eligible for reduced-cost lunch.

== History ==
=== Construction ===
Hialeah Gardens High School was built as an overcrowding reliever school for Barbara Goleman High School. Hialeah Gardens High School serves portions of extreme western Hialeah and the city of Hialeah Gardens; in turn, Barbara Goleman High School took territory from the boundary of American High School. Due to unforeseen construction delays, the student body was divided between the Barbara Goleman High School campus (sophomores) and the Hialeah Gardens Middle School campus (freshmen) for the 2008–2009 school year. The 2009–2010 school year was the first time the building was open and all students began attending the campus.

=== Founding classes ===
In the school's inaugural year, it housed the classes of 2011 and 2012. Hialeah Gardens' first graduating class was the Class of 2011, whose graduation took place at Florida International University on June 10, 2011.

=== School grades ===
School year	Grade
2008–09	B
2009–10	C
2010–11	B
2011–12	B
2012–13	A
2013–14	B
2014-15	C
2016-17	B
2017-18	B
2018-19	B
2021-22	B
2022-23	B
2023-24	B
2024-25	A
2025-26	A

== Academies ==
The school offers a variety of academies that allow career exploration, including engineering, automotive, biomedical and finance academies which are part of the National Academy Foundation program. Moreover, the school has a large AICE program.

== School uniforms ==
As of the 2010–2011 school year, students are required to wear school uniforms. The school uniform consists of white, black, grey, or green polo style shirts, and khaki docker-style pants.

== Athletics ==
The school has a vast variety of athletics. Below some of the school's athletic accomplishments can be found.

- The boys' wrestling team were two-time district runners-up for the 2009–2010 and 2013–2014 seasons.
- The boys' basketball team won the Florida state championship for the 2011–2012 school year against Hagerty High School.
- The boys' swimming team were district champs for the 2011, 2012, 2013, and 2014 season.
- The varsity baseball team won district championships in 2012 and 2016.
- Maria Lopez of the girls swimming team took fourth in the FHSAA state tournament and was crowned the MVP for the 2013 season.

== Notable alumni ==
- Gian Clavell (class of 2012), professional basketball player and Olympian
