= Ronnie Williams (baseball) =

American baseball player (born 1996)

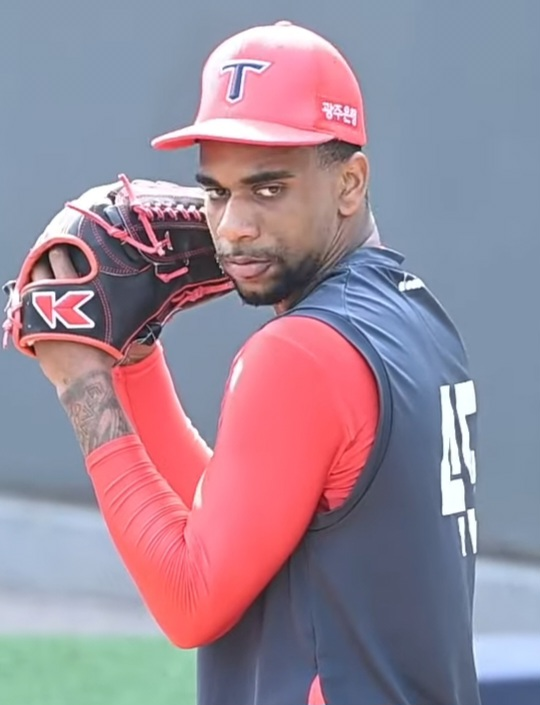
- Williams with the Kia Tigers

Olmecas de Tabasco – No. 0
- Pitcher
- Born: January 6, 1996 (age 30); Miami, Florida, U.S.
- Bats: Right Throws: Right

KBO debut
- April 5, 2022, for the Kia Tigers

KBO statistics (through 2022 season)
- Win–loss record: 3-3
- Earned run average: 5.89
- Strikeouts: 32
- Stats at Baseball Reference

Teams
- Kia Tigers (2022)

Ronnie Ellis Williams (born January 6, 1996) is an American professional baseball pitcher for the Olmecas de Tabasco of the Mexican League. He has previously played in the KBO League for the Kia Tigers. He was drafted by the St. Louis Cardinals in the second round of the 2014 Major League Baseball draft.

== Career ==
Williams attended American Senior High School in Miami, Florida, where he played baseball and went 8–2 with a 0.97 ERA as a senior.

=== St. Louis Cardinals ===
After his senior year, he was selected by the St. Louis Cardinals in the second round with the 68th overall selection of the 2014 Major League Baseball draft. He made his professional debut with the rookie–level Gulf Coast League Cardinals, posting a 4.71 ERA in 10 appearances. Williams spent the 2015 season with the rookie–level Johnson City Cardinals, making 12 starts and going 3–3 with a 3.70 ERA and 43 strikeouts in 56.0 innings of work. He split the 2016 season between the Low–A State College Spikes and Single–A Peoria Chiefs. In 13 total starts, he accumulated a 5–5 record and 3.40 ERA with 69 strikeouts in 82.0 innings pitched.

Williams returned to Peoria in 2017, making 36 appearances out of the bullpen but struggling to a 6.94 ERA with 95 strikeouts in 83.0 innings of work. In 2018, he pitched in 8 games for the High–A Palm Beach Cardinals and the Double–A Springfield Cardinals of the Texas League, registering a cumulative 3.45 ERA with 15 strikeouts it s in 15 2/3 innings pitched. Unfortunately missed nearly all of the season with an elbow injury. He spent the 2019 season again split between Palm Beach and Springfield. In 44 relief outings, he logged a 5–5 record and 4.01 ERA with 58 strikeouts and 2 saves in 58 1/3 innings pitched. Williams did not play in a game in 2020 due to the cancellation of the minor league season because of the COVID-19 pandemic.

=== San Francisco Giants ===
On December 10, 2020, Williams was selected by the San Francisco Giants in the minor league phase of the Rule 5 Draft. He was assigned to the Richmond Flying Squirrels of the Double-A Northeast to begin the 2021 season and was promoted to the Sacramento River Cats of the Triple-A West in early September. Over 29 games (five starts) between the two clubs, Williams went 6–4 with a 2.77 ERA and 69 strikeouts over 78 innings. Williams elected minor league free agency after the season on November 7, 2021.

=== Kia Tigers ===
On December 26, 2021, Williams signed with the Kia Tigers of the KBO League on a $300,000 contract that included a $100,000 signing bonus. In 10 games (9 starts) for the Tigers, he registered a 3–3 record and 5.89 ERA with 32 strikeouts in 44 1/3 innings pitched. On June 29, 2022, Williams was released by Kia following the signing of Thomas Pannone.

=== San Francisco Giants (second stint) ===
On July 14, 2022, Williams signed a minor league contract with the San Francisco Giants organization. He made 10 appearances (9 starts) for the Triple-A Sacramento River Cats, posting a 1–2 record and 7.64 ERA with 31 strikeouts in 33.0 innings pitched. He elected free agency following the season on November 10.

=== Diablos Rojos del México ===
On May 2, 2023, Williams signed with the Diablos Rojos del México of the Mexican League. In 16 starts for the Diablos, he compiled a 4–4 record and 3.24 ERA with 68 strikeouts across 80 2/3 innings pitched.

Williams made 16 starts for México in 2024, registering a 5–1 record and 5.13 ERA with 60 strikeouts across 72 innings of work. With the team, he won the Serie del Rey.

=== Tigres de Quintana Roo ===
On February 5, 2025, Williams was traded to the Guerreros de Oaxaca. He was released by the Guerreros on April 11. The same day as his release from Oaxaca, Williams signed with the Tigres de Quintana Roo of the Mexican League. In six starts for Quintana Roo, he struggled to an 0–3 record and 8.77 ERA with 14 strikeouts across 25 2/3 innings pitched. On May 30, Williams was released by the Tigres.

=== Leones de Yucatán ===
On June 3, 2025, Williams signed with the Leones de Yucatán of the Mexican League. In 26 appearances (one start) for Yucatán, Williams compiled a 4–1 record and 3.99 ERA with 39 strikeouts across 38 1/3 innings pitched.

=== Cleburne Railroaders ===
On August 21, 2025, Williams signed with the Cleburne Railroaders of the American Association of Professional Baseball. In 6 games he threw 9 innings of relief going 1–0 with a 3.00 ERA with 11 strikeouts and one save.

=== Leones de Yucatán (second stint) ===
On February 26, 2026, Williams returned to the Leones de Yucatán of the Mexican League. In 15 starts, he registered a 5–2 record with a 2.43 ERA and 72 strikeouts across 70 1/3 innings pitched.

=== Olmecas de Tabasco ===
On July 17, 2026, Williams was traded to the Olmecas de Tabasco of the Mexican League in exchange for P Raúl Carrillo.

== See also ==
- Rule 5 draft results
