= National Alliance for Public Charter Schools =

American nonprofit organization

- Formation: 2005; 21 years ago
- Type: 501(c)(3)
- Location: Washington, D.C.
- Revenue: $16,255,666 (2019)
- Website: www.publiccharters.org

The National Alliance for Public Charter Schools is an American non-profit trade association for charter schools in the United States. NAPCS advocates for public charter schools, including those that contract with charter management organizations and education management organizations. Their mission is to ensure all children have access to a high-quality public education regardless of their zip code.

== History ==
The organization was founded in 2005 with the support of the Doris & Donald Fisher Fund, Walton Family Foundation, the Annie E. Casey Foundation and the Bill & Melinda Gates Foundation.

== Activities ==
NAPCS publishes an annual guide to state charter school laws, Measuring Up to the Model: A Ranking of State Charter School Laws.

NAPCS once published an annual report on the enrollment of charter schools, Estimated Charter Public School Enrollment. They now have an interactive dashboard that can be found at data.publiccharters.org.

Critics describe the organization as cheerleading for charter schools, rather than drilling down to academic performance statistics.
