= Barbara Goleman =

American teacher from Florida

Barbara Ann Goleman is an American secondary-school teacher of English literature and winner of the 1969 National Teacher of the Year award.

== Biography ==
Goleman was born and raised in Florida. She earned her B.A. in 1952 and M.A. in 1954 at Florida State University.

She began teaching at Miami Jackson High School in 1954 to help repay her college loan. When she began, the school's enrollment was 90% white middle-class students, but after the 1954 Supreme Court ruling on school desegregation, Florida began to admit black students to white schools beginning in 1963. By 1966 the student body at Miami Jackson High School was 85% black poor. Goleman helped develop new programs and demonstrated a caring attitude toward students to build academic success.

She was awarded the 1969 National Teacher of the Year Award for her achievements. She was the first southerner to win the award in 18 years. She received the award on 28 April 1969 from President Richard M. Nixon in a White House ceremony.

Barbara Goleman High School, opened in 1995, was named in her honor.

== Bibliography ==
- A. E. Housman: Proud Rebel. Florida State University. 1954.
