= Catapult Learning =

US instructional services provider

Catapult Learning, Inc
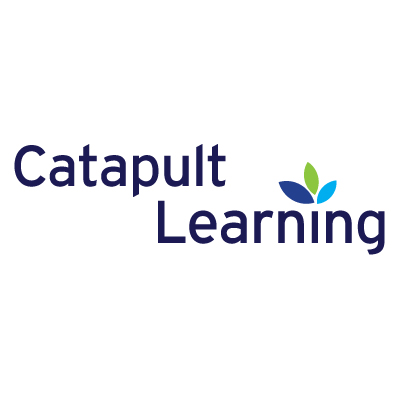
- Industry: Education
- Founded: 1976
- Founder: Stephen K. Freeman
- Headquarters: Pennsylvania, Philadelphia, U.S.
- Key people: Jeffrey Cohen(CEO)
- Website: catapultlearning.com

Catapult Learning, Inc. is a provider of K−12 contracted instructional services to public and private schools in the United States. The company’s portfolio of products and services includes intervention, professional development, school improvement, assessment, dropout prevention and recovery, alternative education, and special education programs. The firm is headquartered in Philadelphia, PA, and serves over 160,000 students and 26,000 teachers in 39 states.

== History ==
Catapult Learning was founded in Philadelphia, Pennsylvania, in 1976 under the name READS as an educational services business for private and religious schools. The company was co-founded by Stephen K. Freeman, who was the Executive Director. and later be President and CEO, serving in that role until 2011. READS was acquired in 1995 by Sylvan Learning Systems, Inc., and the company’s name was changed to Sylvan Education Solutions. In 2003, Sylvan sold its K−12 businesses to Apollo Management LP, which formed Educate Inc.

In 2004, Educate renamed the Sylvan Education Solutions division as Catapult Learning to distinguish the in-school unit from Sylvan’s retail unit, Sylvan Learning Centers. In 2008, the Catapult Learning division was sold to private investors, making Catapult Learning a private, independent company. In 2010, the firm began a series of acquisitions— including Literacy First (2011), Nonpublic Education Services, Inc. (NESI)(2012), Newton Alliance, LLC (2014), and Drop Back In Academy (2014) —and in 2015, the company merged with Specialized Education Services, Inc. (SESI). In September 2015, Jeffrey Cohen was named CEO of Catapult Learning, Inc.
