= Barbara Goleman Senior High School =

Coordinates: 25.9018°N 80.3458°W

Barbara Goleman Senior High
- 14100 NW 89th Ave. Miami Lakes, Florida, U.S. United States

Information
- Type: Public
- Established: August 28, 1995
- School district: Miami-Dade County Public Schools
- Principal: Dr. Manuel Sánchez
- Staff: 110.00 (FTE)
- Faculty: 191
- Grades: 9-12
- Enrollment: 3,071 (2023-2024)
- Student to teacher ratio: 27.92
- Colors: Burgundy and Las Vegas Gold
- Athletics: Football, soccer, baseball, softball, volleyball, bowling, swimming, cross-country, badminton, tennis wrestling, and track and field
- Mascot: Gator
- Campus: Suburban
- Hours: 7:20am – 2:20pm
- Teacher: student ratio: 1:25
- Logo
- Website: barbaragolemansenior.com

Barbara Goleman Senior High School is a secondary school located at 14100 NW 89th Ave in Miami Lakes, Florida; its principal is Manuel Sanchez. Goleman is part of Miami-Dade County Public Schools Region I, and is school number 7751.

The school is named after Barbara Goleman, the 1969 National Teacher of the Year and the only Miami-Dade County Public School teacher to receive this title.

Due to the construction of a new senior high school, Hialeah Gardens High School (located in nearby Hialeah Gardens), Barbara Goleman welcomed sophomores-to-be from American Senior High for the 2008-2009 school year, replacing a portion of the class of 2011, which was transferred to the new school.

== Overview ==
Barbara Goleman Senior High School has studies related to forensic sciences, cybersecurity, law, digital marketing, and college research. They have many activities and events that students and parents can attend also giving students community service hours towards their requirements. They have school volunteer programs, and students help those who are in need. There are a lot of clubs to join, and they even have college assistance for those who have trouble in college applications.

== History and location ==
Barbara Goleman Senior High School was first established on August 28, 1995. The school is the first school in Miami-Dade County Public Schools named after one of its teachers. In 1969, Barbara Goleman was named the National Teacher of the Year, a recognition awarded at the White House by former President Richard Nixon. The first students to enter the school were freshmen and sophomores who were all transferred from Jose Marti Middle School and Henry H. Filer Middle School. The mascot along with the school colors, burgundy and Las Vegas gold, were chosen by the first graduating class. Barbara Goleman Senior High School was named after one of its teachers, Barbara Goleman. The school sits in the town of Miami Lakes on 37.5 acres of land and contains 12 buildings within the school. The one thousand seat auditorium provides plenty of space for any theatrical/musical productions, it also houses a gymnasium with the capacity of 3,000 people. The school also provide extra-curricular activities as well as service clubs, honor societies, and athletic teams. Students are also encouraged to join one of three academies that are part of the National Academy Foundation (NAF), which are the Academy of Finance, Academy of Hospitality and Tourism, and the Academy of Information Technology.

In April 1995, the MDCPS school board denied a proposed boundary for the school as too few students would be African-American.

== Layout ==
Barbara Goleman Senior High has twelve buildings. Buildings 1, 2, 11, and 12 are stand-alone, whereas Buildings 3-10 are interconnected. Building 1 is the largest building in the school, as well as the only one with three floors, it is also referred to as the “regulars” building. It is located on the northern side of the school, directly opposite from Building 2, which houses administrative offices on the first floor, and the school's media center on the second floor. Building 3 is the auditorium, located to the south of Building 2. Buildings 4, 5, 7, 8, and 9 have a combined student capacity near that of Building 1, and are located on the south side of the campus. Most elective courses are located in Buildings 4 and 5, while most science courses are located in Buildings 8 and 9. Building 6 is the cafeteria. Building 10 is the Jorge O. BGHS's gym is named the Sotolongo Gymnasium, in honor of the school's founding principal.

In addition to the original buildings, the school also had twenty-five portables located to the west of Building 1. These portables were commonly referred to as Building 11, although they were not one unified structure. The portables were inhabited by Hialeah Gardens High School rather than Barbara Goleman High School. Building 12 is commonly referred to as the "C" building, the modular, or the Cambridge/Capstone building. It is a modular building recently added to the school, just to the west of Buildings 8-9.

As of 2017, the portables have been removed.

== Demographics ==
Barbara Goleman's student body is 63% Hispanic (of any race), 1% White non-Hispanic, 34% Black, and 2% Asian.

== Grade status ==
The school currently has an "A" grade as of the 2024-2025 academic school year.

School year	Grade
1998-99	D
1999-00	D
2000-01	C
2001-02	C
2002-03	C
2003-04	C
2004-05	C
2005-06	C
2006-07	D
2007-08	C
2008-09	C
2009-10	C
2010-11	B
2011-12	C
2012-13	B
2013-14	B
2014-15	A
2015-16	C
2016-17	B
2017-18	B
2018-19	A
2021-22	A
2022-23	A
2023-24	A
2024-25	A

== Championships ==
Boys' wrestling team:

- 1996 - Francisco Benitez, 152 lbs., District Champion
- 2002 District Champions
- 2016 District Champions
- 2019 District Champions
- 2001 - 2003 - Allan Herrera, 160 lbs., three-time State Champion
- 2007 - Gabriel Espinosa, 125 lbs., State Champion
- 2008 - Rey Parrado, 140 lbs., State Champion

Boys' soccer team:

- 2002 District Champions
- 2007 GMAC Champions

Boys' football team:

- 2004 District Champions

Boys' baseball team:

- 9 district championships
- 2008 Regionals

Girls' soccer team:

- 2007 District Championships

Boys' basketball

- 1999 District Champions

Badminton

- 2008 GMAC Girls' Doubles Champions
- 2009 GMAC Girls' Doubles Champions
- 2009 GMAC Boys' Single Runner-up
- 2009 GMAC Mixed Doubles Runner-up
- 2009 GMAC Mixed Doubles Champions
- 2010 GMAC Boys' Doubles Champions
- 2010 GMAC Mixed Doubles Champions

Softball

- 2004 District Champions
- 2007 District Champions
- 2009 District Champions and Regional Runner-up
- 2010 District Champions and Regional Runner-up

== Overcrowding ==
Beginning in the early 2000s, the school suffered from overcrowding due to a population explosion in the area. The school's population during the 2001-2002 school years surpassed 5,000; this was 1,000 more students than the school's official capacity of 4,015. Goleman's population problems have been alleviated thanks to the creation of nearby Hialeah Gardens High School. The school population now stands under 1,500, in contrast to the situation several years ago when it was near 4,500.

== Title Winning E-Sports Team ==
The Gaming Gators e-sports team was first petitioned for in the 2020/2021 academic school year; It was heavily supported and would be officially established in the following (2021/2022) academic school year. Within only a few weeks, the reported member count was over 300, however due to size and budget restraints, only 10 selected members can be registered for tournaments. The team competes in games including many games in the Call of Duty franchise and Fortnite.

=== Titles ===
The Gaming Gators have been extremely successful. The team has won, as of April 2024, over 60 tournament titles, the most of any school in the county. The most notable titles include:

- (2x) FHSAA High-School E-Sports State Title
- ESL Play R6 Xbox Tournament
- ACGL Rainbow 2v2
- Blast R6 Majors
- Six Invitational
- Jynxzi's "Part-Time Streamer" McDonald's Trophy

== See also ==
- Education in the United States
