= Hialeah Gardens, Florida =

City in Florida

- City
- City of Hialeah Gardens
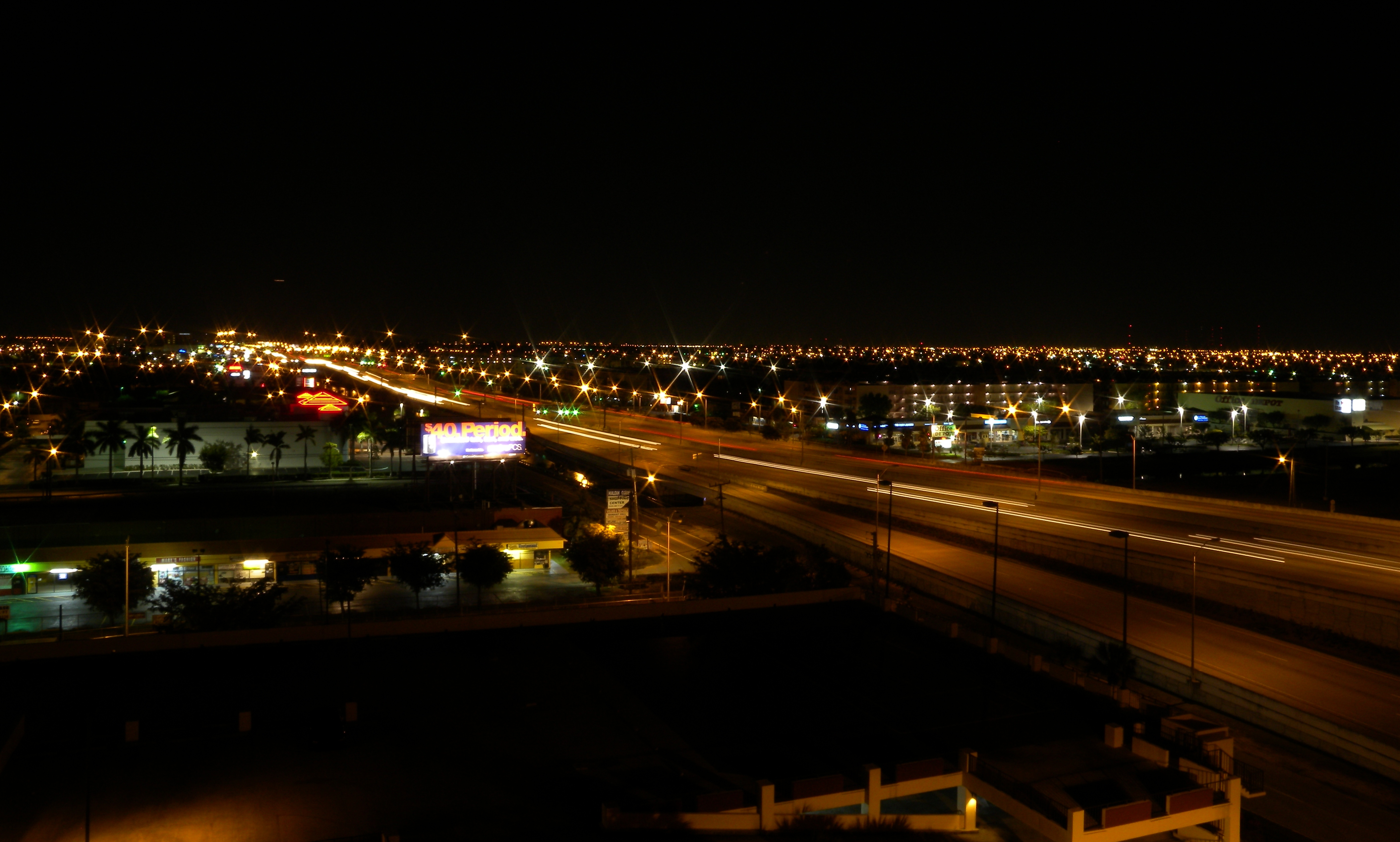
- Palmetto Expressway at night in the direction toward Hialeah Gardens

- Flag Seal

- Location in Miami-Dade County and the state of Florida

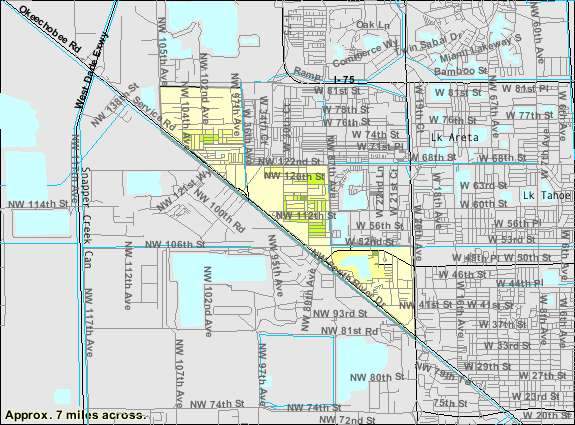
- U.S. Census Bureau map showing city limits prior to the most recent annexation
- Coordinates: 25°53′40″N 80°21′20″W
- Country: United States
- State: Florida
- County: Miami-Dade
- Incorporated: December 1, 1948

Government
  - Type: Council-Mayor

Area
  - Total: 3.67 sq mi (9.51 km^{2})
  - Land: 3.22 sq mi (8.34 km^{2})
  - Water: 0.45 sq mi (1.16 km^{2})
- Elevation: 7 ft (2.1 m)

Population (2020)
  - Total: 23,068
  - Density: 7,159.7/sq mi (2,764.36/km^{2})
- Time zone: UTC-5 (EST)
  - Summer (DST): UTC-4 (EDT)
- ZIP Codes: 33018, 33016
- Area codes: 305, 786, 645
- FIPS code: 12-30025
- GNIS feature ID: 2404690
- Website: www.cityofhialeahgardens.com

Hialeah Gardens is a city in Miami-Dade County, Florida, United States. The city is part of the Miami metropolitan area of South Florida. The population was 23,068 at the 2020 US census, up from 21,744 in 2010. The population density is mostly made up of single-story development.

== History ==
The municipality sprouted from humble beginnings at Walter C. Ohlerts Tourist Camp. By way of 26 unanimous votes, the town of Hialeah Gardens achieved incorporation in December 1948.

In February 1949, Hialeah Gardens adopted its first building code, its first traffic ordinance, and the first laws regarding hunting. Hialeah Gardens served mainly as a rural community in which one of its main industries was raising horses. This existed until 1968 when the city adopted an aggressive land use and zoning master plan to lead the growth of the city. Only a small number of small businesses existed along the Okeechobee Road corridor. The city's close proximity to major roadways, such as Okeechobee Road (U.S. Route 27 / State Road 25) and the Palmetto Expressway (State Road 826), provided the opportunity for Hialeah Gardens to become one of the fastest growing municipalities in the county.

== Geography ==
Hialeah Gardens is located northwest of downtown Miami. It is bordered to the north and east by the city of Hialeah and to the southwest by the town of Medley. U.S. Route 27 (Okeechobee Road) runs along the border with Medley, leading southeast 10 miles (16 km) to its southern terminus at U.S. Route 1 in eastern Miami, and northwest 22 miles (35 km) to Interstate 75 at the former Andytown.

According to the United States Census Bureau, Hialeah has a total area of 3.67 square miles (9.5 km^{2}). 3.22 square miles (8.3 km^{2}) of it are land, and 0.45 square miles (1.2 km^{2}) of it (12.21%) are water.

=== Surrounding areas ===
- Unincorporated Miami-Dade County, Hialeah
- Unincorporated Miami-Dade County Hialeah
- Unincorporated Miami-Dade County, Medley Hialeah
- Medley Hialeah
- Medley

== Demographics ==
Historical population
| Census | Pop. | Note | %± |
|---|---|---|---|
| 1950 | 121 | | — |
| 1960 | 172 | | 42.1% |
| 1970 | 492 | | 186.0% |
| 1980 | 2,700 | | 448.8% |
| 1990 | 7,713 | | 185.7% |
| 2000 | 19,297 | | 150.2% |
| 2010 | 21,744 | | 12.7% |
| 2020 | 23,068 | | 6.1% |
U.S. Decennial Census

=== 2020 census ===
As of the 2020 census, Hialeah Gardens had a population of 23,068. The median age was 44.5 years. 18.0% of residents were under the age of 18 and 18.5% of residents were 65 years of age or older. For every 100 females there were 91.8 males, and for every 100 females age 18 and over there were 89.4 males age 18 and over.

100.0% of residents lived in urban areas, while 0.0% lived in rural areas.

There were 7,258 households and 5,657 families in Hialeah Gardens; 37.9% had children under the age of 18 living in them. Of all households, 50.2% were married-couple households, 13.1% were households with a male householder and no spouse or partner present, and 26.8% were households with a female householder and no spouse or partner present. About 12.9% of all households were made up of individuals and 6.7% had someone living alone who was 65 years of age or older.

There were 7,395 housing units, of which 1.9% were vacant. The homeowner vacancy rate was 0.3% and the rental vacancy rate was 2.5%.

Hialeah Gardens racial composition (Hispanics excluded from racial categories) (NH = Non-Hispanic)
| Race | Number | Percentage |
|---|---|---|
| White (NH) | 1,117 | 4.84% |
| Black or African American (NH) | 51 | 0.22% |
| Native American or Alaska Native (NH) | 3 | 0.01% |
| Asian (NH) | 102 | 0.44% |
| Pacific Islander or Native Hawaiian (NH) | 1 | 0.00% |
| Some Other Race (NH) | 57 | 0.25% |
| Two or more races/Multiracial (NH) | 63 | 0.27% |
| Hispanic or Latino (any race) | 21,674 | 93.96% |
| Total | 23,068 | |

Racial composition as of the 2020 census
| Race | Number | Percent |
|---|---|---|
| White | 5,500 | 23.8% |
| Black or African American | 168 | 0.7% |
| American Indian and Alaska Native | 28 | 0.1% |
| Asian | 116 | 0.5% |
| Native Hawaiian and Other Pacific Islander | 1 | 0.0% |
| Some other race | 3,144 | 13.6% |
| Two or more races | 14,111 | 61.2% |
| Hispanic or Latino (of any race) | 21,674 | 94.0% |

=== 2010 census ===
Hialeah Gardens Demographics
| 2010 Census | Hialeah Gardens | Miami-Dade County | Florida |
|---|---|---|---|
| Total population | 21,744 | 2,496,435 | 18,801,310 |
| Population, percent change, 2000 to 2010 | +12.7% | +10.8% | +17.6% |
| Population density | 6,690.1/sq mi | 1,315.5/sq mi | 350.6/sq mi |
| White or Caucasian (including White Hispanic) | 92.9% | 73.8% | 75.0% |
| (Non-Hispanic White or Caucasian) | 4.1% | 15.4% | 57.9% |
| Black or African-American | 2.2% | 18.9% | 16.0% |
| Hispanic or Latino (of any race) | 94.9% | 65.0% | 22.5% |
| Asian | 0.7% | 1.5% | 2.4% |
| Native American or Native Alaskan | 0.1% | 0.2% | 0.4% |
| Pacific Islander or Native Hawaiian | 0.0% | 0.0% | 0.1% |
| Two or more races (Multiracial) | 1.4% | 2.4% | 2.5% |
| Some Other Race | 2.7% | 3.2% | 3.6% |

As of the 2010 United States census, there were 21,744 people, 6,344 households, and 5,123 families residing in the city.

=== 2000 census ===
In 2000, 47.5% had children under the age of 18 living with them, 64.7% were married couples living together, 15.7% had a female householder with no husband present, and 13.0% were non-families. 9.7% of all households were made up of individuals, and 4.7% had someone living alone who was 65 years of age or older. The average household size was 3.38 and the average family size was 3.56.

In 2000, the city population was spread out, with 27.7% under the age of 18, 8.1% from 18 to 24, 32.9% from 25 to 44, 20.9% from 45 to 64, and 10.5% who were 65 years of age or older. The median age was 34 years. For every 100 females, there were 92.9 males. For every 100 females age 18 and over, there were 88.1 males.

In 2000, the median income for a household in the city was $38,858, and the median income for a family was $39,804. Males had a median income of $25,540 versus $20,862 for females. The per capita income for the city was $14,043. About 10.9% of families and 13.3% of the population were below the poverty line, including 16.4% of those under age 18 and 21.0% of those age 65 or over.

As of 2000, Hialeah Gardens has the highest percentage of Spanish speakers of any city in the United States (neighboring Hialeah is the second). As of 2000, 95.69% of the population spoke Spanish at home as a first language, while those who spoke only English as a mother tongue made up 4.31% of the population.

== Education ==
Miami-Dade County Public Schools serves Hialeah Gardens.

From 2007 to 2009 construction began on 3 new schools in the Area along Hialeah Gardens Blvd and Okeechobee. West Hialeah Gardens Elementary School opened in the 2007–2008 school year and was used to Alleviate nearby Hialeah Gardens Elementary School and Ernest R Graham Elementary School. Hialeah Gardens Middle opened in 2008–2009 school year to alleviate Jose Marti Middle School in neighboring West Hialeah as well as Mater Academy Middle School and Youth Co-Op Charter School. Hialeah Gardens High was opened in the Fall of 2009 to alleviate Barbara Goleman Senior High in Miami Lakes

Hialeah Gardens High School serves Hialeah Gardens.

Mater Academy Middle/High School also serves the Hialeah Gardens area

== Notable people ==
- Albert Almora, baseball player for the New York Mets
- Manny Machado, baseball player for the San Diego Padres
- Omar Mateen, perpetrator of the Pulse nightclub shooting, buried in Hialeah
