= American Senior High School (Miami-Dade County, Florida) =

American public high school

Coordinates: 25.94014°N 80.307083°W

Location
- 18350 NW 67th Avenue; Miami, Florida; United States

Information
- Type: Public
- Established: September 1976
- School district: Miami-Dade County Public Schools
- Principal: Humberto Brito
- Teaching staff: 77.00 (FTE)
- Grades: 9–12
- Enrollment: 1,627 (2023–2024)
- Student to teacher ratio: 21.13
- Campus: Suburban
- Colors: Red; White; Blue
- School hours: 7:20 AM to 2:20 PM
- Average class size: 22
- Student-faculty ratio: 19.8
- Website: americanshs.net

American Senior High School, or American High School, is a high school located in Country Club, unincorporated Miami-Dade County, Florida. Its principal is Humberto Brito. It has been named a Blue Ribbon School of Excellence.

== Overview ==
American was opened in 1976 (the year of America's bicentennial); its name, sports teams (Patriots) and colors (red, white, and blue) were chosen to reflect this.

The school uses a Hialeah address but mainly serves northern Miami Lakes, including Palm Springs North and The Country Club of Miami.

American's main athletic rival is Barbara Goleman High School. Other rivals include Hialeah-Miami Lakes High School, Miami Carol City High School, Hialeah High School and Miramar High School.

American is composed of three buildings: the main building which houses most of the classrooms, and the buildings which house the freshman class in order for there to be enough room for the rest of the student body in the main building.

== History ==
At the time the school was built, cow pastures were in the area. It opened with grades 9–11 with 12th added the next year. Its projected initial enrollment was 1,800. Glenda Graham Harris, then one of two women to be principal of a Dade County senior high school, was the initial principal. In December 1976 the school had 1,846 students, with about 33% each Hispanic/Latino, African-American, and non-Hispanic white.

Robert Bork of The Miami Herald wrote that upon opening and by December of that year, American SHS was "troubled by violence". Parents who were non-Latino white organized a boycott in December to show frustration at the violence situation. On Monday December 6, 1976, 791 students, or 42% of the student body, boycotted school. The next day 36% boycotted. By Thursday December 9 the percentage was down to 28%, or about 500 students. The school board assigned two employees to defuse the situation.

== Demographics ==
American High's student population is 67% Hispanic, 28% Black, 1% Caucasian, and 1% Asian. About 81% of the students receive free or reduced-priced lunch, compared to a district average of 43%. The gender breakdown is 50% male, 50% female.

== American feeder pattern ==
Middle schools that feed into American include:

- Bob Graham Education Center
- Lake Stevens Middle School
- Lawton Chiles Middle School
- Mater Gardens Academy Middle
- Miami Lakes Middle School

Elementary schools that feed into American include:

- Charles D. Wyche Elementary
- Joella C. Good Elementary
- Lake Stevens Elementary
- Mater Gardens Academy Elementary
- Palm Springs North Elementary
- Spanish Lake Elementary

== Notable alumni ==
- Larry Brown – professional football player, Minnesota Vikings (1987)
- Tyrese Cooper – track athlete
- Romy González - professional baseball player
- James Jones – former professional basketball player and 3x champion for the Miami Heat and Cleveland Cavaliers currently the vice president of basketball operations for the Phoenix Suns. Played collegiately at the University of Miami
- Dascha Polanco - American Dominican actress
- Darnell Sweeney - professional baseball player
- Olivier Vernon – professional football player, New York Giants, played collegiately at the University of Miami
- Darryl Williams – defensive back, Cincinnati Bengals (1992–1995, 2000–2001), Seattle Seahawks (1996–1998), played collegiately at the University of Miami
- Ronnie Williams - professional baseball player
- Smokepurpp - Rapper
