= Ria Cheruvu =

American actress, child prodigy

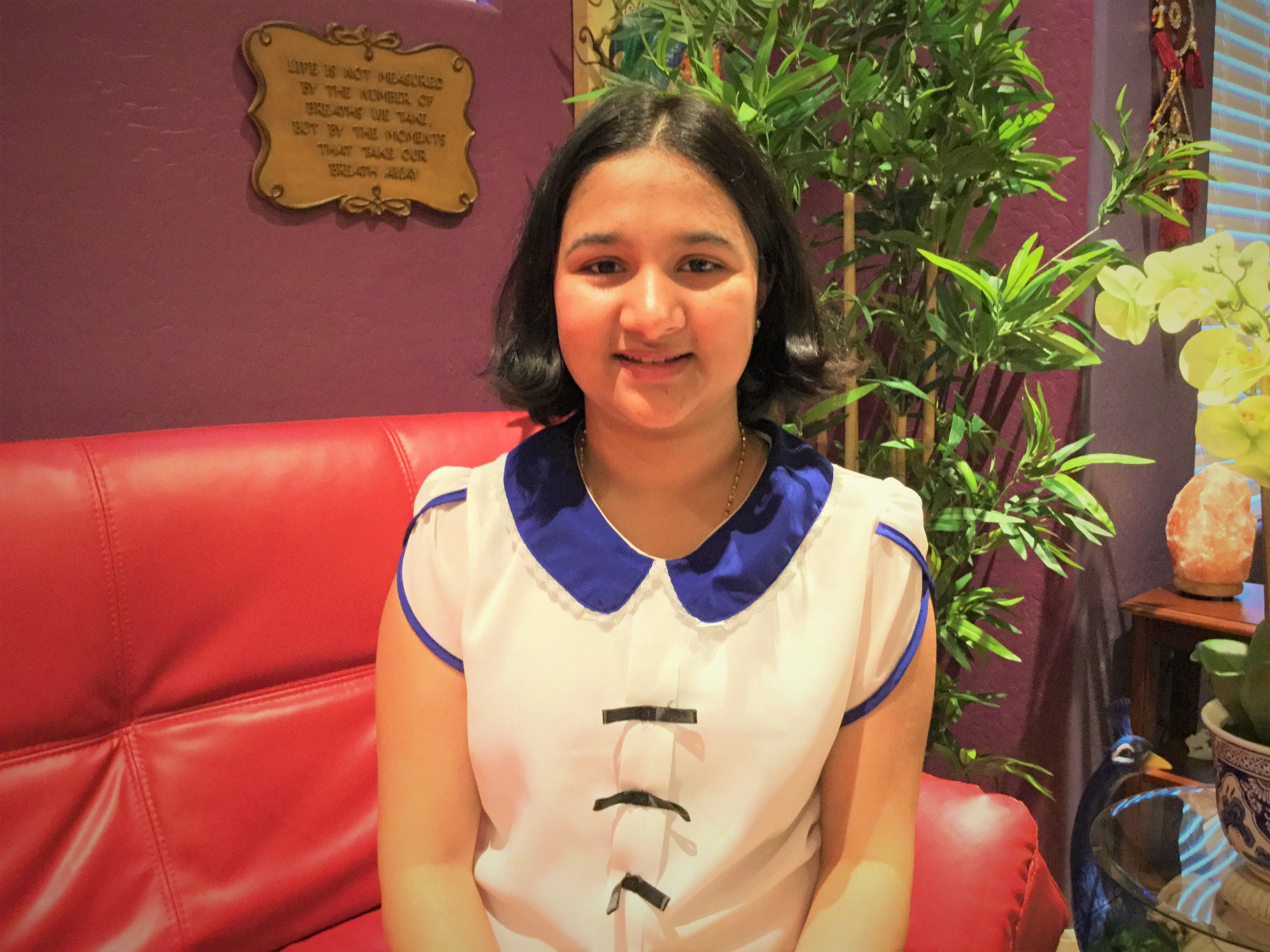
- Cheruvu in 2016
- Born: Gilbert, Arizona, U.S.
- Education: Harvard University (ALB, ALM)

Ria Cheruvu is an American child prodigy from Gilbert, Arizona (U.S.). She graduated from high school in May 2015 at age 11. She received an undergraduate and a graduated degree from Harvard Extension School. She is also an actress and has appeared in stage and film productions in the United States and India.

== Early life ==
Cheruvu's parents came to the United States from India. Her father, Sunil, is a computer programmer. Her mother, Sunitha, is a former software engineer.

Cheruvu's parents suspected she was a prodigy when she was nine months old. When she was 18 months old, a news station in Seattle, Washington, produced a segment about her ability to name 43 U.S. presidents.

== Education ==
Cheruvu enrolled in Arizona Connections Academy, a free, online public school, when she was four years old, and she graduated in 2015 at the age of 11 as a valedictorian. As of 2016, she is the youngest person to graduate from the school.

After graduating high school, Cheruvu enrolled in computer science courses at Harvard University's Extension School. She on the dean's list for academic excellence (cum laude) in 2016 and 2017. She plans to pursue a career in neural cryptography.

Cheruvu graduated from the Harvard University Extension School in her third year at age 14 with an ALB in computer science in 2018, making her the youngest ALB graduate in Harvard history. She is currently enrolled in the Harvard University Extension School's Master of Liberal Arts, or ALM, program in data science. She is set to graduate in 2020.

== Career ==
Cheruvu has appeared in two commercials and has acted in stage productions of "The King and I" and "Annie." She has also appeared in a South Indian film called "Karma," and as of 2012 she was contracted to appear in two Hollywood movies.

After graduating with her ALB degree in 2018, Cheruvu became an intern at Intel who works on "simulating model topologies on future generation hardware."

Cheruvu and her mother volunteer with the Make-a-Wish Foundation. The family also owns farmland in India on which a government school is run. Cheruvu's family provides aid to that school and have been doing so for many years.
