= Doral Academy Preparatory School =

Doral Academy Preparatory Charter Middle & High School

Location
- 11100 NW 27 ST, Doral, FL, 33172; Doral, Florida; United States; 25.797953°N 80.3773587°W

Information
- Type: Charter
- Established: 1999
- Founder: Doral Academy, Inc.
- School district: Miami-Dade County Public Schools
- Principal: Carlos A. Ferralls
- Teaching staff: 69.00 (FTE)
- Grades: 6–12 (Including Middle & High School)
- Enrollment: 2,003 (2022–23)
- Student to teacher ratio: 29.03
- Colors: Red and White (High School); Navy blue and Gray (Middle School)
- Mascot: Firebird
- Nickname: Doral
- Rival: Downtown Doral Charter Upper School
- Website: doralacademyprep.org

Doral Academy Preparatory High School is a public charter middle/high school located in Doral, Florida, United States. The school is supported by Academica, an education service provider.

== Curriculum ==
The school offers twenty-nine Advanced Placement (AP) courses and several honors courses. Dual enrollment courses at Miami Dade College and Florida International University are available beginning in sophomore year. The goal of the Scholars Program is for students to simultaneously graduate with an Associates of Arts degree and a high school diploma. The school also offers a Pre-Advanced Placement program for selected middle school students.

In the 2016–2017 school year, an International Baccalaureate (IB) program was added to the school's curriculum. Doral Academy Charter is a school with an independently managed academic organization, approved and monitored by the local school board. Unlike private schools, which charge tuition fees, Doral Academy is funded by the Florida Department of Education and provides free education to any student eligible to attend public school in Miami-Dade County Public Schools.

== Extracurricular activities ==
Doral Academy offers interscholastic sports for boys and girls at the high school and middle school level. The 2015-2016 Boys' swim team won the Class 3A state championship. The 2018 Boys Basketball team also won the class 6A state championship.

Clubs and honor societies at the school including the National Honor Society, Future Business Leaders of America, Mu Alpha Theta mathematics honor society, Model United Nations, and Key Club. Most of these clubs have been involved in competitions, and have been involved in helping out the community. At the 2017 Mu Alpha Theta National Convention, the Math Honor Society placed third in the country.

== Notable alumni ==
- Owen Green (2017), soccer player for Chattanooga Red Wolves SC
- Zach Neto (2015—transferred), baseball player for the Los Angeles Angels
- Devin Carter (2020), basketball player for the Atlanta Hawks
- Pietra Tordin (2022), soccer player for the Princeton Tigers
