= Ben Gamla Charter School =

Coordinates: 26.0100°N 80.1599°W

Location
- 2620 Hollywood Blvd; Hollywood, Florida; United States

Information
- Type: Charter school
- Established: August 20, 2007
- School district: Broward County Public Schools
- Grades: K-12 (across all 5 campuses)
- Enrollment: ~2000 (across all 5 campuses)
- Language: English and Hebrew
- Campus: Suburban
- Website: www.bengamla-charter.com www.bengamlapreparatoryacademy.org www.bengamlaplantation.org

The Ben Gamla Charter School is an English-Hebrew charter school, the first of its kind in the U.S., located in Hollywood, Florida. It opened August 20, 2007, with approximately 400 enrolled students from kindergarten through eighth grade, though the Ben Gamla system has expanded to 5 campuses in South Florida in both the Ben Gamla Charter Schools, as well as the Ben Gamla Preparatory Academy. The entire Ben Gamla system currently enrolls students from grades K-12 across all 5 campuses, with a total enrollment of about 2,000 students. Of the five total schools in the Ben Gamla system, three schools are in Broward County, one is in Miami-Dade County and one is in Palm Beach County. The school's director is an Orthodox rabbi and at least 50% of the students accepted to the school are Jewish. The name of the school is taken from an Israelite high priest (Yehoshua Ben Gamla), known in the Talmud for his campaign to establish yeshivas throughout Judaea.

== Controversy ==
On August 23, 2007, the Broward County school board ordered the school to suspend its Hebrew classes because the curriculum referred to a website that discussed religion. Supporters of the Hebrew classes compare the program to hundreds of other dual-language schools in the United States that provide lessons on foreign culture and language such as the Spanish, French and Greek language charter schools already operating in Broward County and elsewhere.

Parallels have been drawn between Ben Gamla and the Khalil Gibran International Academy, an Arabic public school in New York City that also opened in autumn 2007. But some say the Hebrew school could be more problematic. Since it is a charter school it receives public funding but is exempt from certain rules of public schools and is subject to less oversight. Their founders are often teachers, parents, or activists who feel restricted by traditional public schools. Basically, the operators are private contractors who make a deal with the government to educate the children. In contrast, the Arabic school is under the direct management of the NYCDOE system and subject to all its rules, regulations, and statutes. Others, such as Jeffrey Wiesenfeld, a trustee of the City University of New York feel that Hebrew language schools do not pose the kind of "potential threat to the society" posed by Arabic language schools.

Opposition to the school is led by Broward County Jewish day schools who have lost students to Ben Gamla and therefore suffer losses in tuition income. The South Florida Sun-Sentinel reported that "an advertisement distributed in kosher restaurants" in the area of the Hebrew school reads: "Excellent Academic Program. Dual language (English/Hebrew) curriculum teaching Jewish history and culture. Rabbi Adam Siegel, Principal (formerly executive director of Yeshiva Elementary School)." This school was clearly marketed in the Jewish community in a way to suggest that it will be similar to a yeshiva, a traditional religious school where Judaism's authoritative texts are studied, but the tuition there is about $10,000 per student per year.

According to an article in The New York Times, "Opponents say it is impossible to teach Hebrew – and aspects of Jewish culture – outside a religious context, and that Ben Gamla, billed as the nation's first Hebrew-English charter school, violates one of its paramount legal and political boundaries."Harvard Law School professor and constitutional scholar Noah Feldman has criticized the school's Hebrew curriculum as violating of the Establishment Clause of Constitution on the grounds that the school "seems poised to teach religion as a set of beliefs to be embraced rather than as a set of ideas susceptible to secular, critical examination."

Abraham Foxman, national director of the Anti-Defamation League said of the school, "[c]harter schools have greater autonomy than a school being run by the Board of Education. Let’s give it a shot, but let’s watch it very, very carefully."

On September 11, 2007 the Broward County School Board approved a Hebrew-language curriculum and Hebrew instruction resumed at the school on September 17, 2007.

In 2026, the foundation affiliated with the school, the National Ben Gamla Jewish Charter Foundation, was involved in a legal dispute to open a virtual charter school in Oklahoma using taxpayer money.

== Campuses ==
Ben Gamla currently has expanded to include multiple campuses in the split between the Ben Gamla Charter Schools (grades K–8) and the Ben Gamla Preparatory Academy Charter Schools (grades 6–12). In total, the entire system has 4 campuses serving about 1,800 students in total . The charter numbers connected to Ben Gamla are: #5001/5410 Ben Gamla Charter (grades K-8, Hollywood), #5392 Ben Gamla Charter South (grades K-8, Plantation), #5182 Ben Gamla Preparatory Academy (grades 9–12, Hollywood), #5204 Ben Gamla Preparatory Academy (grades 6–8, Hollywood).

Ben Gamla has received school grades of C, B and A over the years, and school #5001 (Hollywood K-8) currently meets the criteria for 'high performing charter school status' (pursuant to section 1002.331, Florida Statutes). The known grades for each school are below:

1. 5001 (BG Charter North K-5): A (2014–2015)
2. 5410 (BG Charter North 6-8): B (2014–2015)
3. 5392 (BG Charter South K–5):
4. 5182 (BG Preparatory Academy Charter 7–12):

== Ben Gamla Preparatory Academy ==
Ben Gamla Preparatory Academy is currently the only high school that offers high school grades in the various Ben Gamla campuses. It is directly across the street to the original Ben Gamla Charter School which originally offered Kindergarten to 8th Grade, but now only offers Kindergarten to 6th Grade due to the addition of the school.

The school is led by Gayle Iaocono, alongside Danielle Guski as acting Vice Principal with 19 teachers in all of the classrooms.

The governing board selected by the local government to manage Ben Gamla Preparatory Academy include 5 directors:

- Debra Klien
- Daniel Fernandez
- Henry Ellenbogen
- Gary Puckrein
- Michelle Gerson
- Sharon Miller
- Jack Zucker

== See also ==
- Hebrew Language Academy Charter School
- Language/culture based charter school
