= Okeechobee Youth Development Center =

Coordinates: 27°18′26.5″N 80°49′26.5″W

The Okeechobee Youth Development Center (formerly known as Eckerd Youth Development Center) is a high-risk residential program that treats male inmates ages 13–21 who are sentenced by the courts. Most inmates stay in the program for 9 to 12 months and it includes a transitional program which includes a less secure "cottage" setting outside of the fenced-in area.

The program offers education and vocational training, mental health services, substance abuse counseling, case management, social training, behavior modification, transition planning.

It is considered a level 8 program in the state of Florida, often referred to as a juvenile detention center. It was once administrated by Eckerd Youth Services but as of 2012 it is administrated by G4S Youth Services, LLC. For organizational purposes, it is under the purview of Washington County Public Schools, although the facility is located in Okeechobee County.
