= Pathway Academy =

Coordinates: 30.3337°N 81.6594°W

Pathways Academy
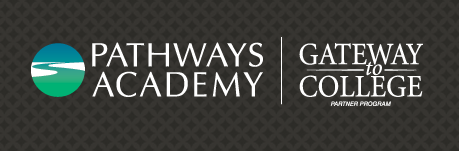

Location
- 101 W. State Street, Suite 3001; Jacksonville, Florida; United States

Information
- Type: Charter School
- Motto: Putting You on the Right Path to a Better Life
- Established: 2006
- School board: Duval County Public Schools
- Principal: Erick Trent
- Grades: 9th–12th
- Enrollment: 200+
- Campus: Urban Area
- Website: Official School Webpage

Pathways Academy is a Charter School located in Jacksonville, Florida, part of the Duval County Public Schools. It is located in the Downtown Campus of Florida State College at Jacksonville (FSCJ) at 101 W. State Street, Suite 3001, which is on the top floor at the college. This school is accredited with Southern Association of Colleges and Schools (SACS).

Pathways Academy opened in August 2006 and "was geared for high school dropouts or students considered high risk", stated FSCJ spokeswoman Jill Johnson. As of April 2014, the school has closed "so the college can better focus on its core mission of providing quality higher education" says Johnson, "Charter schools are typically not run through state colleges. It's important we remain focused on what we began doing, which is higher education".

== Graduation rates ==
- 2006 to 2007: 9 Students Graduating with Exit High School Diplomas
- 2007 to 2008: 25 Students Graduating with Exit High School Diplomas
- 2008-2009: 37 Students Graduating with Exit High School Diplomas
- 2009-2010: 45 Students Graduating with Exit High School Diplomas

== Programs ==
- Automotive
- Aviation Mechanics
- Building Construction
- Child Care
- Cosmetology
- Distribution
- Fire Science
- Health Care
- Law Enforcement
- Massage Therapy
- Transportation
