= Kid's Community College =

Coordinates: 27.830100°N 82.303046°W

- Logo of Kid's Community College
- Riverview, Florida; United States

Information
- Type: Charter and Private Preschool
- Motto: Dedicated to the well-being and educational success of EVERY child.
- Established: 2003
- School district: Hillsborough and Orange County
- President: Timothy B. Kilpatrick, Sr.
- Grades: 4 months - 12th grade
- Colors: White, Gray, and Gold
- Athletics: Volleyball, Soccer, Cross Country, Flag Football, Street Hockey, Cheer and Basketball
- Mascot: Cougar
- Rivals: Bell Creek Academy (Valrico Academy), Winthrop Charter School
- Information: (813) 671-1440
- Address: 11513 McMullen Road; Riverview, FL 33569
- Website: Official website

Kid's Community College, also referred to as KCC, is a public charter school and private preschool based in Riverview, Florida. Established in 2003 by Timothy B. Kilpatrick, Sr., Kid's Community College provides educational services and care for children six weeks of age through grade 12.

== History ==
In March 2003, Timothy B. Kilpatrick, Sr. founded the first Kid's Community College (KCC) preschool campus in Riverview, Florida. During the 2005-2006 school year, Kilpatrick expanded the KCC educational offerings to include the Kid's Community College Elementary Charter School, serving grades kindergarten through fifth. Kid's Community College Franchises formed on November 21, 2006, and began offering KCC preschool franchises in November 2007. During the 2009-2010 school year, the Kid's Community College Middle Charter School (KCCMCS) opened its doors providing services for sixth grade, grew to sixth and seventh grade in 2010-2011, and expanded to sixth through eighth grade in 2011-2012.

As of December 2017, there were eight KCC schools serving PreK through K12 students in Hillsborough and Orange counties. KCC subscribes to the Multiple Intelligence Theory of Howard Gardner, offers full PYP International Baccalaureate programs and one national and one international accreditations.

== Campuses ==
KCC Winter Program

KCC 5th Grade Graduation

As of December 2017, there were six Kid's Community College campuses.

=== KCC Lake Saint Charles Preschool ===
In September 2017, the LSC Preschool moved into a facility shared with KCC Prep High.

=== KCC Riverview South Preschool ===
KCC Preschool Riverview South was established in 2012 and is located in the emergent Southern part of Riverview, Florida. The RS facility houses 15 employees and 75 preschool children ranging from one to five years of age and includes VPK and an after school program. The RS campus is an expansion of its nearby LSC campus and shares the KCC tradition of high- performance and stellar program offerings.

As of 2011, the KCC-RS campus was franchise owned and operated by Vandrese and Michael Williams, DBA Adventures-n-Babysitting, Inc.

=== KCC Riverview South Campus, Riverview, FL ===
Kid's Community College Riverview South Charter School, a tuition-free campus, was established in 2005 within the Lake Saint Charles community located in Riverview, Florida. The campus initially served 54 students in kindergarten through second grade and expanded to a complete elementary school by the 2008-2009 school year, serving 348 students in grades kindergarten through fifth. In 2012, the school moved into a newly constructed, 40,000sf facility at 10030 Mathog Road in Riverview. Riverview South was recognized as a high-performing charter school by the State of Florida, has received numerous awards and Governor recognitions for student achievement, many athletic championships and as of 2014, it had a B grade. Florida School Grade The Riverview South campus has also achieved and maintained accreditation since 2010 through the North Central Association Commission on Accreditation and School Improvement (NCA-CASI). Riverview South is in its 12th year as a free public Hillsborough County elementary school of choice. Prior to

=== KCC Middle Charter School, Riverview FL ===
The Kid's Community College Middle Charter School (KCCMCS) tuition-free campus was established in 2009 in Riverview, Florida. The campus initially served 22 students in sixth grade and expanded to a complete middle school by the 2011-2012 school year, serving 198 students in grades sixth through eighth. KCCMCS is an "A" rated school that consistently performs as one of the highest middle schools in Hillsborough County. It merged with KCC Elementary in 2015-16 to form KCC Riverview South.

=== KCC Elementary Orange County, Ocoee, FL ===
The Orange County School Board approved the Kid's Community College Elementary Orange County Campus in October 2010. The tuition-free campus opened during the 2012-2013 school year and as of 2017, it was serving 266 students in grades kindergarten through fourth grade. In 2014, KCC Orange students ranked 2nd in proficiency of all elementary schools in Orange County of FCAT 2.0 reading.

=== KCC Riverview Southeast IB Elementary and Middle Schools, Riverview, FL ===
KCC RSE International Baccalaureate school represents KCC's first tuition-free, public international educational offering. The school moved into a state-of-the-art campus in the summer of 2012 and as of 2014, it was serving 260 IB students in grades kindergarten through fifth grade. The campus has an active waiting list of more than 600 students and is fully authorized by the IBO World Organization for its PYP programming.

KCC RSE Middle School is in the authoring process of IB candidacy and serves 6th though 8th grade students in its new 17,000sf facility next door to the elementary campus.

=== KCC Preparatory High School, Riverview, FL ===
KCC Preparatory High School opened its doors in the fall of 2017 in a new 30,000sf campus in Lake Saint Charles.

== Kid's Community College Franchises ==
Kid's Community College Franchises formed on November 21, 2006, and began offering KCC preschool franchises in November 2007. Only a select group of 85 Kid's Community College Franchises will be awarded in the Eastern U.S.

== Awards ==
KCC Receives the Ultimate Management Team Award

- 2007 - Small Business of the Year Award
- 2008 - Best Places to Work Finalist
- 2008 - Best of Riverview Award in the Private and Parochial Schools Category by the US Local Business Association
- 2009 - Best Places to Work 2nd Place Winner
- 2009 - Ultimate Management Teams
