= Mater Academy Charter School =

Location
- 7901 Northwest 103rd Street; Hialeah Gardens, Florida 33016; United States
- 25°52′6″N 80°19′32″W

Information
- Type: Charter
- Established: August 2002
- Founder: Fernando Zulueta
- School district: Miami-Dade County Public Schools
- Principal: Alex Tamargo
- Teaching staff: 50.00 (FTE)
- Grades: 6-12
- Enrollment: 1,650 (2023–2024)
- Student to teacher ratio: 33.00
- Campus: Suburban
- Colors: Green and gold
- Athletics: Yes
- Mascot: Marty The Lion
- Rival: Jose Marti MAST 6-12 Academy
- National ranking: 331
- Test average: SAT: 1140; ACT: 23
- Newspaper: "Lions Roar"
- Yearbook: "Picture This"
- School hours: 7:30 AM to 2:30 PM
- Website: www.matermiddlehigh.org

Mater Academy Charter Middle/High School (often called Mater by students and alumni) is a coeducational charter school for day students in grades 6 through 12, and offers more than twenty-seven AP courses to students. Located in Hialeah Gardens, Florida, it ranks #33 in the state, and #331 in the nation.

== Performing Arts Pavilion ==
The Performing Arts Pavilion, adjacent to the main campus, was completed in February 2007 and initiated in April 2007. The building provides classroom and multimedia support for the main campus. Classes such as Guitar and Beginning Band are held in the building. It is also used to host presentations by guests — one notable example being Pitbull — faculty meetings, and administrative functions. The Pavilion also includes space for outdoors eating and vending machines.

== Other building additions ==
Since its opening in 2002, the school's campus has been substantially expanded, with one of the earliest of additions being a new building to the north of the main one. Early in the 2014–2015 school year, two new buildings were opened on campus, one of which was dedicated to Mater Academy's sister school, Mater Academy Charter Elementary School. Further expansions continue to take place, primarily to the main building. Including the addition of the new building, the STEM Building.

== Recognitions ==
Mater Academy won the Silver Medal from U.S. News & World Report's America's Best High Schools two years in a row, and the College Board's 2011 Inspiration Award. In the 2008–2009 school year, the Middle School, High School, and Performing Arts and Entertainment Academy divisions all received an "A" rating in the state's FCAT examination.

== Notable events ==
In September 2021 Conor McGregor paid the school a surprise visit to Mater where students cheered as he entered "The Lion Den."

Shedeur Sanders visited Mater Academy to work out with his Colorado teammates in preparation for the 2025 NFL Draft and to engage with students. During his visit in March 2025, he shared his experiences and the importance of hard work, provided pizza for the students, and hosted a Q&A session

== Notable alumni ==
- Albert Almora, MLB outfielder for the Chicago Cubs
- Julio Horrego, Honduran swimmer and Olympic representative
- Zack Moss, NFL running back for the Buffalo Bills
