= Cheron Brylski =

American writer and activist

Cheron Michelle Brylski, (born 1958 in Cheektowaga, New York) is a writer, speechwriter, public relations director and activist who built a career helping minorities and women enter the political mainstream in Louisiana and improve their quality of life through education, health and economic reform. She was the first woman to be appointed to the chartered position Public Information Director for the City of New Orleans by the late Mayor Ernest Nathan Morial. She worked in city government from 1980 to 1986, when she started her own consulting business. headquartered in New Orleans

== Personal life ==
Ms. Brylski was married to the late Harold F. Baquet, a celebrated photographer in New Orleans. They lived in the Touro Bouligny neighborhood. Ms. Brylski attended Gregory Junior High and graduated from John F. Kennedy High of New Orleans. Both public schools were destroyed in the 2005 levee failure following Hurricane Katrina. She received her Bachelors in Journalism and Political Science from Loyola University of the South in 1980 and a Masters in Political Science from the University of New Orleans in 1983.
