= Charter management organization =

A charter management organization (CMO) is an educational organization that operates charter schools in the United States. Charter schools are public schools that operate independently of the local government school district.

A CMO contracts with a charter school to provide a specific service or set of services. They may not hold the charter except for in AZ. By convention, a CMO manages at least three schools and serves at least 300 students. Additionally, they must be a separate business entity from the school.

== History ==
Economist Milton Friedman in 1955 proposed that education could be improved by a universal school voucher program. A free market in primary and secondary education would allow consumers (parents) to choose among alternatives, stimulating competition and improvement. In 1974, Ray Budde, a professor at the University of Massachusetts Amherst, floated the idea of a charter school. In 1991, Minnesota enacted legislation that enabled charter schools. Other states followed.

Some commercial charter management organizations operate large networks of schools.

EdisonLearning was founded in 1992.

== Variants ==
=== Non-profit CMOs ===
Many states have adopted laws that require that the holder of the school charter be a non-profit organization. In these instances, a charter school must form a 501(c)(3) non-profit organization. Typically this new business entity forms a school board to oversee the operations of the new public charter school. However, they may then choose to contract with a CMO to provide management related services.

Examples include:

- Knowledge Is Power Program
- Imagine Schools

=== For-profit EMOs ===
Wisconsin, California, Florida, Michigan, and Arizona allow for-profit corporations to manage charter schools.

Examples include:

- Stride, Inc.
- Academica

=== Vendor operated school ===
In some cases a school's charter is held by a non-profit that chooses to contract all of the school's operations to a third party, often a for-profit CMO. This arrangement is defined as a vendor-operated school, (VOS).

== Distinction from education management organization ==
CMOs in some usages are distinct from EMOs (education management organizations). One authority on schools, Stanford University's Center for Research on Education Outcomes makes no distinction between terms. In its recent reports it describes CMO -- non-profit and CMO -- for-profit.

The National Alliance for Public Charter Schools makes a clear distinction. CMOs are non-profit; EMOs are for-profit.
