= For-profit education =

Education from a profit-making business

For-profit education (also known as the education services industry or proprietary education) refers to educational institutions operated by private, profit-seeking businesses. For-profit education is common in many parts of the world, constituting more than 70% of the higher education sector in Malaysia, Japan, South Korea, Indonesia and the Philippines.

== Australia ==
In 2011, Australia had over 170 for-profit higher education institutions, representing 6% of the total student population. Their qualifications are legally equivalent to those issued by the public universities, but there have been concerns raised by external audits about the quality of education and standards in for-profit colleges.

There are concerns over the low representation of Indigenous students, students from low socio-economic status backgrounds and students from non-English speaking backgrounds in for-profit colleges, which lag public universities. However, for-profit colleges do provide a second chance to many students who would not otherwise have access to higher education. Partnerships between for-profit "pathway" colleges and public universities have also proven effective in recruiting overseas students. In this model, students spend a year at the pathway college before transferring to the university to complete their degree; 70% of students at pathway colleges are foreign, going on to make up 45% of foreign students recruited by partner universities.

== China ==
In 2021, China banned for-profit tutoring companies.

== United Kingdom ==
The UK does not permit for-profit schools (independent schools are mostly non-profit making trusts), but there are a number of for-profit institutions in higher education. In 2013, Michael Gove, then secretary of state for education, was said to have drawn up plans to allow free schools and academies to become for-profit businesses, and in 2014, his successor Nicky Morgan refused to rule out for-profit schools. However, the Conservative manifesto for the 2015 General Election committed the party not to introduce for-profit schools, and after the Conservative victory, Morgan ruled out any place for for-profit schools in the UK education system.

In higher education, by contrast, there are a large number of for-profit providers. A study by the Department for Business, Innovation and Skills identified 674 privately funded institutions and estimated that the majority were for-profit businesses (based on survey returns from 249 providers, of which 136 identified as for-profit). Most of the 136 for-profit colleges that returned the survey were either non-specialist (56) or specialized in business, management and accountancy (49). There are three for-profit universities in the UK: the University of Law, BPP University and Arden University, which are the only for-profit institutions with degree-awarding powers.

== United States ==
There are two types of for-profit schools. The first major category of for-profit schools is post-secondary institutions, which operate as businesses, receiving fees from each student they enroll. The second type of for-profit schools, which is less prevalent in the United States, are K–12 private schools which often operate as businesses.

However, in many public schools, private and for-profit forces still exist. One such force is known as an education management organization (EMO); these are management organizations for primary and secondary educational institutions. EMOs work with school districts or charter schools, using public funds to finance their operations. They typically offer schools back-office services, but may also provide teacher training, facility support, and other management related services. In the 2018–19 school year, roughly 10% of charter schools contracted with a for-profit EMO, while about 30% contracted with a non-profit charter management organization.

While supporters of EMOs argue that the profit motive encourages efficiency, this arrangement has also drawn controversy and criticism.

Kevin Carey of the New America Foundation said in a 2010 column in The Chronicle of Higher Education that "For-profits exist in large part to fix educational market failures left by traditional institutions, and they profit by serving students that public and private nonprofit institutions too often ignore." He also said that "There's no doubt that the worst for-profits are ruthlessly exploiting the commodified college degree. But they didn't commodify it in the first place."

== See also ==
- List of for-profit universities and colleges
- List of unaccredited higher education institutions in Switzerland
- Proprietary colleges

== Bibliography ==
- Brown, H.; Henig, J.; Holyoke, T.; Lacireno-Paquet, N. (2004). "Scale of Operations and Locus of Control in Market- Versus Mission-Oriented Charter Schools" Social Science Quarterly; 85 (5) Special Issue Dec 2004. pp. 1035–1077
- Halperin, D. (2014). Stealing America's Future: How For-Profit Colleges Scam Taxpayers and Ruin Students' Lives
- Hentschke, G. et al. (2010). For-Profit Colleges and Universities: Their Markets, Regulation, Performance, and Place in Higher Education
- Mettler, S. (2014). "Degrees of Inequality"
- Blumenstyk, G. (2014). American Higher Education in Crisis?: What Everyone Needs to Know
- Breneman, D. et al. (2006). Earnings from Learning: The Rise of For-profit Universities
- Halperin, D. (2014). Stealing America's Future: How For-Profit Colleges Scam Taxpayers and Ruin Students' Lives
- Hentschke, G. et al. (2010). For-Profit Colleges and Universities: Their Markets, Regulation, Performance, and Place in Higher Education
- Kinser, K. (2006). From Main Street to Wall Street: The Transformation of For-Profit Higher Education
- McGuire, M. (2012). Subprime Education: For-profit Colleges and the Problem with Title IV Student Aid Duke Law Journal, 62 (1): 119–160
- Morey, A. (2004). Globalization and the Emergence of For-profit Education
- Murphy, J. (2013). Mission Forsaken—The University of Phoenix Affair With Wall Street
- Natale, S., Libertella, A., & Doran, C. (2015;2013). "For-profit education: The sleep of ethical reason." Journal of Business Ethics, 126(3), 415–421. doi:10.1007/s10551-013-1938-1
- Ruch, R. (2003). Higher Ed Inc.: The Rise of the For-Profit University
