= Academica (charter school) =

American charter school service and support organization

Academica Dade LLC
- Type: Privately held company
- Industry: Education
- Founded: 1999; 27 years ago
- Headquarters: Miami, Florida
- Revenue: $39.8 million (modelled) (2021)
- Owner: Fernando Zulueta
- Number of employees: 165 (modelled) (2021)
- Website: www.academica.org

Academica is a for-profit private education company headquartered in Miami, Florida. As an education service provider (ESP), it services over 200 public charter schools in the United States. It is owned and managed by CEO Fernando Zulueta and is considered one of Florida's largest school management companies. In 2011 it reported $158 million in revenue.

Mater Academy, a charter school operator headquartered in Miami is "linked" to Academica.

== Origins ==
Fernando Zulueta had created a Miramar, Florida housing development in 1997 that needed a local school for the residents. He recruited Ruth Jacoby, who had over twenty years experience with Miami-Dade County Public Schools to be the first principal for Somerset Neighborhood School, a non-profit Charter school authorized by the Florida legislature in 1996. Zulueta incorporated Academica in 1999 as a for-profit provider of services to charter schools. With the help of his brother, they grew an empire of 200 charter schools that rely on Academica for curriculum, tests, facilities, security, staff recruitment, budgeting, accounting and other services. The company also assists clients in launching independent charter schools by writing charter school applications, establishing corporate structures, providing experts to advocate and lobby government agencies, managing public relations & marketing, and ensuring regulatory compliance. The “Academica umbrella” schools are from networks including Somerset Academy, Doral Academy, Pinecrest Academy and Mater Academy.

== Political connections ==
While Erik Fresen was in the Florida legislature (2008–2016) he chaired the House Education Appropriations Subcommittee. His architectural firm had financial ties to Academica and his brother-in-law was Fernando Zulueta. He had also worked as an Academica lobbyist prior to his election. A conflict of interest ethics complaint was filed against him in 2011 for voting on a proposal that would give benefits to some charter schools, and in the 2016 legislative session he fast-tracked a bill to force Florida public school districts to share their construction tax money with charters.

While serving the in Florida Legislature, Anitere Flores and Manny Díaz Jr. both worked as corporate officers at Doral College and helped ease restrictions on charter schools. Doral College is associated with Academica.

== Controversy ==
In 2007, Miami-Dade school district auditors asked the Miami-Dade state attorney's office to investigate a multi-million construction contract to build an Academica charter school given to a contractor which served on the same school's board.

The owners of Academica have significant real estate assets housing the charter schools. The properties are exempt from property tax. In 2010, the owners of Academica owned more than 20 companies doing business with Academica schools. Moreover, it was claimed that the school boards, which approve the real estate contracts, are financially connected to Zulueta.

Between 2013 and 2014, the Office of the Inspector General (OIG) of the US Department of Education conducted an audit of the relationship between charter schools and ESP's, including Academica's schools in Florida, identifying related party transactions between the for-profit Academica and a real estate company that leased both buildings and security services to the schools.
