= Education management organization =

For-profit entity that manages schools

An education management organization (EMO) is a term of art describing a for-profit entity that manages schools. It provides a distinction from charter management organization which is a non-profit manager of charter schools. The terms are often used interchangeably, with resulting confusion.

Other and older usages of the term describe an organization that develops and distributes school curricula. These organizations in the United States provide the curricula for public schools, charter schools, virtual schools, and homeschooling parents.

== History ==
In 1991, Minnesota enacted legislation that enabled charter schools. Other states followed.

The state or its delegate issues a charter to a school. In most states, the charter-holder has the privileges and responsibilities of a school board, but not the taxing authority. Many states have adopted laws that require that the holder of the school charter be a non-profit organization. As a result, the most common form of a charter management organization is a 501(c)(3) non-profit organization. The charter holder may contract all aspects of school operation to an education management organization. The EMO accepts the full amount of state subsidy per student. If it can operate at a lower cost, the difference is profit for the EMO. The school may advertise that it is a non-profit, which it is, even if there is a for-profit entity operating in the background.

== For-profit EMOs ==
Wisconsin, California, Michigan, Massachusetts, and Arizona allow for-profit corporations to manage charter schools.

Examples include:

- Stride, Inc.
- Academica
- Pansophic Learning
- Connections Academy

== Vendor operated school ==
In some cases a school's charter is held by a non-profit that chooses to contract all of the school's operations to a third party, often a for-profit CMO. This arrangement is defined as a vendor-operated school, (VOS).

== Distinction from charter management organization ==
One authority on schools, Stanford University's Center for Research on Education Outcomes makes no distinction between terms. In its recent reports it describes CMO -- non-profit and CMO -- for-profit.

The National Alliance for Public Charter Schools makes a clear distinction. CMOs are non-profit; EMOs are for-profit.
