= Doral Senior High School =

Doral Senior High School or Doral High School may refer to one of three different schools in Doral, Florida:

- Doral Academy Preparatory School
- J. C. Bermudez Doral Senior High School
- Ronald W. Reagan/Doral Senior High School
