= J.C. Bermudez Doral Senior High School =

Location
- 5005 NW 112th Avenue; Doral, Florida 33178; United States
- 25.81981631464938°N 80.37654120635192°W

Information
- School type: Public, high school
- Established: August 2020
- School district: Miami-Dade County Public Schools
- Teaching staff: 42.00 (FTE)
- Grades: 9–12
- Enrollment: 1,153 (2023-2024)
- Student to teacher ratio: 27.45
- Campus type: Small City
- Mascot: Thunder (Thor)
- Website: jcbdoralthunder.com

J.C. Bermudez Doral Senior High School is a public comprehensive high school in Doral, Florida. It is a part of Miami-Dade County Public Schools.

Its namesake is Juan Carlos Bermudez, the Mayor of Doral. Its attendance boundary map includes central Doral and points west to the boundary of Miami-Dade County.

== History ==
The school opened in fall of 2001 as Doral Middle School, changing its name to John I. Smith Middle School in fall 2012.

In 2011, due to overcrowding of students, Ronald W. Reagan/Doral Senior High School moved 9th graders to the third floor of the building, known as Reagan’s South Campus, while the bottom two floors were John I. Smith Middle School until the 2019-2020 school year.

The Miami-Dade Public Schools Board of Trustees voted to name the school after Bermudez in June 2020.

It opened in fall 2020. Initially it only enrolled students in grade 9, adding another grade level each year. The founding principal, previously employed at Miami Springs Senior High School, is Ed Smith.

== Feeder patterns ==
Eugenia B. Thomas K-8 Center and John I. Smith K-8 Center in Doral are Bermudez's feeder schools.
