= Miami-Dade Animal Services =

Agency of the government of Miami-Dade County

Miami-Dade County Animal Services is an agency of the government of Miami-Dade County. Its main animal shelter facility is in Doral. It has an overflow facility in Medley.

== History ==
In 2023 Douglas Hanks of the Miami Herald described the main shelter as having been "overwhelmed" in 2021 due to more people giving up dogs.

Bronwyn Stanford was the director of the department from 2021 to 2023.

In 2024, due to a large number of dogs in the agency's placement, the department began having weekend operation hours for the Medley overflow facility.

In 2026 the agency stated that it was to build a second animal shelter in the "South Dade" area. It is scheduled to open in 2027. It is not scheduled to take animal surrenders, with the Doral facility still being the countywide surrender facility.
