= Miami Springs Senior High School =

Miami Springs 6-12 Preparatory Academy
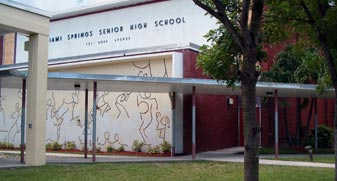
- Miami Springs 6-12 Preparatory Academy in 2013 as Miami Springs Senior High School

Location
- 751 Dove Ave; Miami Springs, Florida 33166; United States; 25.83071°N 80.29467°W

Information
- School type: Public, high school middle school
- Established: September 1964
- School district: Miami-Dade County Public Schools
- Principal: Nelson Gonzalez
- Staff: 44.00 (FTE)
- Grades: 6-12
- Enrollment: 1,067 (2023-2024)
- Student to teacher ratio: 24.25
- Campus type: Suburban
- Colors: Garnet and Gold
- Mascot: Golden Hawk (Hank the Hawk)
- Newspaper: Zeitgeist
- Website: miamispringshawks.net

Miami Springs 6-12 Preparatory Academy (formerly Miami Springs Senior High School) is a secondary school located at 751 Dove Avenue in Miami Springs, Florida, United States; its principal is Nelson Gonzalez (2022–Present). The school is part of Miami-Dade County Public School's nationally accredited magnet program, specializing in travel and tourism, the oldest of its kind in the state of Florida (established in 1987).

As of 2011, Miami Springs offers IGCSE (International General Certificate of Secondary Education) courses and the iTech academy; hosting advanced computer programming and mechanical engineering courses.

Miami Springs serves sixth through twelfth grade students in the city of Miami Springs, the village of Virginia Gardens, the town of Medley, the southern portion of the city of Hialeah (south of 29th Street, and south of 25th Street after Hialeah Park) and a small unincorporated residential neighborhood east of Miami International Airport. It used to serve the western Miami suburb of Doral until 2006, when a new high school was built in that area.

Beginning in the 2007-2008 school year, the opening of Westland Hialeah High School in the southern portion of Hialeah removed the entire portion of southern Hialeah served by the school and located West of Palm Avenue; however, all portions of the boundary located east of Palm Avenue in Hialeah remained served by the school.

== History ==
Construction at Miami Springs 6-12 Preparatory Academy began in 1963 with the clearing of a large wooded lot at the site of the current campus. There were no homes built directly on the site, which was one of the last areas of thick jungle growth in the incorporated Miami Springs. The first day of classes at Springs was delayed due to Hurricane Cleo striking Miami on August 27, 1964. Springs first opened its doors after Labor Day the following week, in September, as an overcrowding reliever for nearby Hialeah High School. The first school year, 1964–65, served 9th 10th and 11th grade students, and the second, 1965–66, offered classes for 10th, 11th and 12th grades. Therefore, the first graduating class of Miami Springs was the Class of 1966.

This was one of three high schools in the district seriously affected by overcrowding in the early 2000s during the county's largest population growth since 1980. Its student population in the 2001-02 school year peaked at 4,750. The same year, it implemented a "split shifts" schedule in which 9th and 10th grade students would attend classes in the afternoons, while 11th and 12th grade students, as well as student-athletes, attended in the morning. Despite being the third most populous school in the district after G. Holmes Braddock High School and Barbara Goleman Senior High School, Springs was considered the most overcrowded, as its capacity was only 2,500 students, while Braddock and Goleman's capacities each surpassed 4,000. The school resumed a regular schedule for the 2003-2004 school year as overcrowding was relieved upon the opening of Ronald W. Reagan Doral High School, a school in the nearby suburb of Doral that was previously served by Miami Springs.

Miami Springs 6-12 Preparatory Academy has been a Title I school since the program was expanded to Miami-Dade Public Schools in 2002, due to its extremely high rate of foreign-born students (66.9% in 2013, 70.7% in 2005 and 52.2% in 1997). In 2013, Miami Springs was ranked as the public high school with the highest proportion of foreign-born students nationwide, followed closely by Ronald W. Reagan Doral High School at 65.8% and Miami Senior High School at 61.2%.

This exceptionally high rate makes Miami Springs one of the most unusual public schools in the US, with over 70% of its course offerings either in Spanish or reformulated in English for Spanish speakers. This has been a boon to its extensive Advanced Placement program, and Springs was ranked among the top 10 high schools nationwide for Hispanic students performance in the AP program - 65% passing rate across all subjects - with first-generation immigrant Hispanic students receiving the highest scores.

The school has a strict policy to remove students not living within its boundaries. As a result, the school's overcrowding has been significantly reduced. This policy may have helped improve Miami Springs' test scores, helping raise it from a D rating in 2003 to a B rating in 2005 and 2006, an A School in 2013, and an A+ school in 2024, only for it to become a C school by the end of the 2024-25 school year. As of 2026 Miami Springs is a B school

In 2009 Hialeah Gardens High School opened, taking attendance boundary territory from Barbara Goleman High School and Miami Springs 6-12 Preparatory Academy. In turn, Goleman took territory from American High School.

Prior to January 2012, many students had left, going to magnet schools and charter schools. In late October 2011, Principal Tom Ennis moved to Miami Killian High School. Under his term, the school's MCAT rating went from B to C, and Bill Daley of the Miami Herald stated that there was a low morale at the end of Ennis' term. Anna Rodriguez became principal in 2011. Daley stated that Rodriguez, at the beginning, "invigorated the school."

As of August 2015, Miami Springs 6-12 Preparatory Academy switched to the common - period, 32-credit schedule and graduation requirements to meet the standards and requests of the PTSA and other high schools in the district who had already adopted the schedule.

In 2015 a plaque honoring Bruce Wayne Carter, an alumnus of the school who became Private First Class and died in the Vietnam War, was installed.

As of August 2026, Miami Springs Senior High School officially merged with Miami Springs Middle School, closing the middle school campus and turning it into a 6-12 academy.

== School uniforms ==
The school uniform policy was first implemented in 2003, but updated in 2022, 2024, 2025, and 2026 As of August 2026, shirts must be collared and must be burgundy (middle school) and black (high school), Pants must be khakis.

Miami Springs is one of the few entirely closed campuses in the Miami metropolitan area. It was one of the most expensive high schools to build because it was also the first to include climate control (unlike the Mediterranean courtyard-style architecture used in most other high schools), and thus was able to succeed in the humid, tropical climate of Miami.

== Publications ==
- The school's monthly newspaper is the Zeitgeist, meaning "Spirit of the Times" in German.
- The school's yearbook is the Spectre, which celebrated its 50th edition in 2015.

== Notable clubs and extracurricular activities ==
- Anchor Service Club: The Miami Springs Anchor Club is a tradition of excellence that stretches back for many years. This club is dedicated to the surrounding communities, and donates time, money and volunteer efforts to those in need. Their annual projects range from school supply and Christmas toys drives to the recycling project at the River Cities Festival. They also perform Brainminders Puppet Shows, to help promote brain safety to children. In 2010, the club was awarded "Outstanding International Club of the Year" and attended the International Pilot Convention in Louisville, Kentucky.
- Color Guard
- Eco-Hawks Environmental Club
- HOSA
- Marching band: 2nd place in 2011
- Medical Hawks
- Mu Alpha Theta: Since the mid to late 1990s, the Miami Springs Senior High School Mu Alpha Theta chapter has had the distinction of being first in the county and ranking in the top ten statewide. In the 06-07 season, Springs Mu Alpha Theta team won 5th place in the National Mu Alpha Theta math competition, beating powerhouses nationwide. The team maintained a top-ten ranking since 2001, producing several national champions in diverse topics such as Advanced Calculus and Number Theory.
- National Honor Society
- Odyssey of the Mind
- Orchestra: This club performs at the annual Fall and Spring Concerts, as well as Christmas at the Circle for the past four years. In 2005-2006 and 2006-2007 they received three Superior ratings and went to state competition, and in 2008-2009 and 2009-2010 they received two Superior ratings and an Excellent.
- Thespian Troupe 1466: The school's Thespian Troupe is part of the International Thespian Society. They work in conjunction with the school's Drama club, The Golden Players. In recent years, they have won numerous Critic's Choice Awards at the district and state levels with monologues, duet acting scenes, ensemble acting scenes, and student-directed scenes. The group also had the honor of presenting a mainstage production at the Florida State Thespian Festival with their performance of Anatomy of Gray by Jim Leonard Jr. In the 2008-2009 school year, they won Superior ratings at the Florida Theatre Conference and the District 8 One-Act Play Festival with their 40-minute version of Yemaya's Belly by Quiara Alegría Hudes. This marked the first time that the school received Superiors at both competitions.
- Winter Drumline: As of the 2010-2011 school year, the drumline has not participated in any competitions due to instructor absence.
- Winter Guard

== Academics ==
The State's Accountability program grades a school by a complex formula that looks at both current scores and annual improvement on the State Exams from ELA, Math, Science and Social Studies.

The school's grades by year since the FCAT began in 1998 are:

- 1998-99: D
- 1999-00: D
- 2000-01: D
- 2001-02: D (316 points)
- 2002-03: D (306 points)
- 2003-04: C (328 points)
- 2004-05: B (385 points)
- 2005-06: B (386 points)
- 2006-07: C (459 points)
- 2007-08: B (507 points)
- 2008-09: B
- 2009-10: B
- 2010-11: C
- 2011-12: A
- 2012-13: B
- 2013-14: B
- 2014-15: B
- 2015-16: C
- 2016-17: C
- 2017-18: C
- 2018-19: B
- 2021-22: B
- 2022-23: B
- 2023-24: A
- 2024-25: C
- 2025-26: B
- 2026-27: Possibly B, likely C

== Notable alumni ==
=== Government ===
- Kendrick Meek - former Democratic member of the United States House of Representatives since 2003, representing Florida's 17th congressional district, US Senate candidate 2010
- Manny Díaz, Jr. (born 1973), Republican member of the Florida House of Representatives, Florida Senate and Appointed as the 28th Commissioner of Education for the State of Florida in 2022.
- Ric Prado - CIA operative

=== Entertainment ===
- Sean Carrigan - Soap opera actor who starred on The Young and the Restless; Starred in movies such as John Carter and The Single Moms Club
- Erik Courtney - Bravo TV personality, starring on Newlyweds: The First Year
- David Fumero - Soap opera actor who starred on One Life to Live and on Power; former male fashion model

=== Sports ===
==== Football ====
Current NFL players:

- None.

Former NFL players:

- T. Y. Hilton - Indianapolis Colts; Florida International University; 4x NFL Pro-Bowler, 2016 NFL Receiving Yards Leader
- Devin Aromashodu - Chicago Bears, Minnesota Vikings, Indianapolis Colts, and drafted by the Miami Dolphins; Auburn University; Super Bowl Champion
- Lomas Brown - Detroit Lions, Arizona Cardinals, Tampa Bay Buccaneers, New York Giants; University of Florida; Consensus All-American; 7x NFL Pro-Bowler; Super Bowl Champion
- Hector Gray - Detroit Lions; Florida State University
- Craig Jay - Green Bay Packers; Mount Senario
- Gartrell Johnson - San Diego Chargers, Atlanta Falcons, New York Giants; Colorado State University
- Vince Kendrick - Atlanta Falcons, Tampa Bay Buccaneers; University of Florida
- Reggie Kinlaw - Oakland Raiders, Seattle Seahawks; Oklahoma University; 2x Super Bowl Champion
- Willis McGahee - Buffalo Bills, Baltimore Ravens, Denver Broncos, Cleveland Browns; University of Miami; Consensus All-American; NCAA National Champion; 2x NFL Pro-Bowler
- Eddie Miles - Pittsburgh Steelers; University of Minnesota
- Orpheus Roye - Pittsburgh Steelers, Cleveland Browns; Florida State University; Super Bowl Champion

==== Baseball ====
Current MLB players:

- Yasmani Grandal - Chicago White Sox, Milwaukee Brewers, Los Angeles Dodgers, San Diego Padres; University of Miami; drafted in the 1st round, # 12 overall, of the 2010 MLB Draft by the Cincinnati Reds; 2x MLB All-Star

Former MLB players:

- John Cangelosi - Chicago White Sox, Pittsburgh Pirates, Florida Marlins; 1997 World Series champion

== See also ==
- Miami-Dade County Public Schools
- Education in the United States
