= Divieto Ristorante =

Restaurant information
- City: Miami and Cape Coral
- State: Florida
- Country: United States
- Reservations: Yes
- Website: www.divietoristorante.com

Divieto Ristorante is a chain of Italian restaurants in Miami and Cape Coral, Florida.

== Overview ==
Divieto, Italian for "prohibition," offers a modern version of 1920's New York decor. Its locations offer both casual dining and special occasions.

The original restaurant was established in Doral, Florida. Its founders have operated Mexican, Argentinian, Mediterranean and Italian restaurants since 1995.

Its menu features a variety of classic Italian dishes.
