= Hector Gray (American football) =

American football player (born 1957)

No. 26
- Position: Defensive back

Personal information
- Born: January 2, 1957 (age 69); Miami, Florida, U.S.
- Listed height: 6 ft 1 in (1.85 m)
- Listed weight: 192 lb (87 kg)

Career information
- High school: Miami Springs (Miami Springs, Florida)
- College: Florida State
- NFL draft: 1980: undrafted

Career history
- Detroit Lions (1980–1983)
- Stats at Pro Football Reference

Hector Gray (born January 2, 1957) is an American former professional football player who was a defensive back for the Detroit Lions of the National Football League (NFL) from 1981 to 1983. He played college football for the Florida State Seminoles.
