= Ric Prado =

Cuban-American businessman and intelligence operative

Enrique Alejandro Prado
- Born: May 3, 1950 (age 76); Santa Clara, Cuba
- Education: Miami Springs High School
- Occupations: businessman, intelligence operative

Enrique Alejandro “Ric” Prado is a Cuban-American businessman and former intelligence operative, who worked for the Central Intelligence Agency in multiple roles.

== Early life ==
Enrique Alejandro “Ric” Prado was born on May 3, 1950, in Santa Clara, Cuba. His family fled Cuba after Fidel Castro’s 1959 revolution, settling in Miami, Florida. In Miami Prado attended Miami Springs High School, where he became friends with Alberto “Albert” San Pedro, a fellow Cuban-American who would later become a notorious drug trafficker. After high school Prado enlisted in the U.S. Air Force in 1971. Enrique Prado entered the Air Force Special Operations Command branch, earning combat-diver and survival qualifications.

== Career in the CIA ==
Prado joined the Central Intelligence Agency in 1980 and served in a covert, paramilitary capacity. In total he spent about 24 years with the Agency. His first assignments were as a “ground branch” paramilitary officer; for example, Prado spent three years embedded in Central America's Contra guerrilla camps during the 1980s. He also directed counterinsurgency and counterterrorist programs in South America and Southeast Asia – including operations in Peru and the Philippines.

Over time Prado rose through the clandestine ranks. By the mid-1990s he held senior leadership posts. Prado headed the CIA's intelligence liaison and operations in East Asia – for example, he led the Agency's Korea Operations and was Chief of CIA Liaison in Seoul. He later served as Chief of Station in a “hostile” Middle Eastern country. During the late 1990s Prado moved into counterterrorism management. He was Deputy Chief of Station at one overseas post and was a founding member of the CIA's original Bin Laden Task Force (also known as the Bin Laden Issue Station) under Cofer Black in 1995. At the time of the September 11, 2001 attacks, he was Chief of Operations in the CIA's Counterterrorist Center, coordinating the Agency's special-operations activities with other U.S. military and federal agencies. He is said to have participated in a secret CIA assassination squad targeting al-Qaeda terrorists after 9/11. Prado retired in the early 2000s as a Senior Intelligence Service officer (SIS-2, equivalent to a two-star general).

== Later life ==
After leaving the CIA, Prado entered the private sector. He served as a vice president of the private military contractor Blackwater (later renamed Academi) from 2004 to 2008. In that role he helped organize Special Operations teams and overseas security programs. According to the International Spy Museum, Prado “worked as an executive at a private military contractor where he built a specialized operations team” after retiring from the U.S. government. Following his Blackwater tenure Prado co-founded Camp X Training, a Virginia-based special-operations training company.

Prado also turned to writing and speaking about his career. In 2022 he published a memoir, Black Ops: The Life of a CIA Shadow Warrior (St. Martin's Press), recounting his experiences. In retirement he has appeared on podcasts and lecture panels, and he remains active in security-training circles.

== Controversy ==
In a 2012 report journalist Evan Wright alleged that Prado had once been a mob hitman before joining the CIA. According to Wright's reporting in How to Get Away with Murder in America (2012), Prado was a longtime enforcer for Alberto “Albert” San Pedro – a Cuban-American drug trafficker and reputed Miami mob figure – dating back to Prado's youth. Wright wrote that Prado and San Pedro met in high school, and that Prado “started out [his] career as a hitman for [a] notorious Miami mobster”. Investigators quoted in these reports described Prado as suspected in multiple murders in Miami during the 1970s–80s. For example, Wright's reporting alleges that Prado participated in the 1977 killing of Richard Schwartz (Meyer Lansky’s stepson). In all, one Miami detective told Wright he had evidence suggesting Prado was “technically a serial killer” and linked to at least seven homicides.

Wright's 2012 exposé reported that local and federal investigators built RICO and murder cases around Prado's ties to San Pedro – even convening a grand jury in 1991 – but ultimately no charges were brought. According to Wright, FBI and Miami-Dade task-force detectives drafted a 30-page indictment of racketeering and murder counts. However, Wright quotes investigators (including detective Mike Fisten) as saying the case was dropped after Prado's move to the CIA. Fisten is quoted saying it was a “miscarriage of justice that Prado never faced charges,” and that the CIA “fought us tooth and nail” when they tried to question Prado.

== Awards ==
- Distinguished Career Intelligence Medal
- George HW Bush Award for Excellence in Counterterrorism

== See also ==
- Bin Laden Issue Station
