= Devin Aromashodu =

American football player (born 1984)

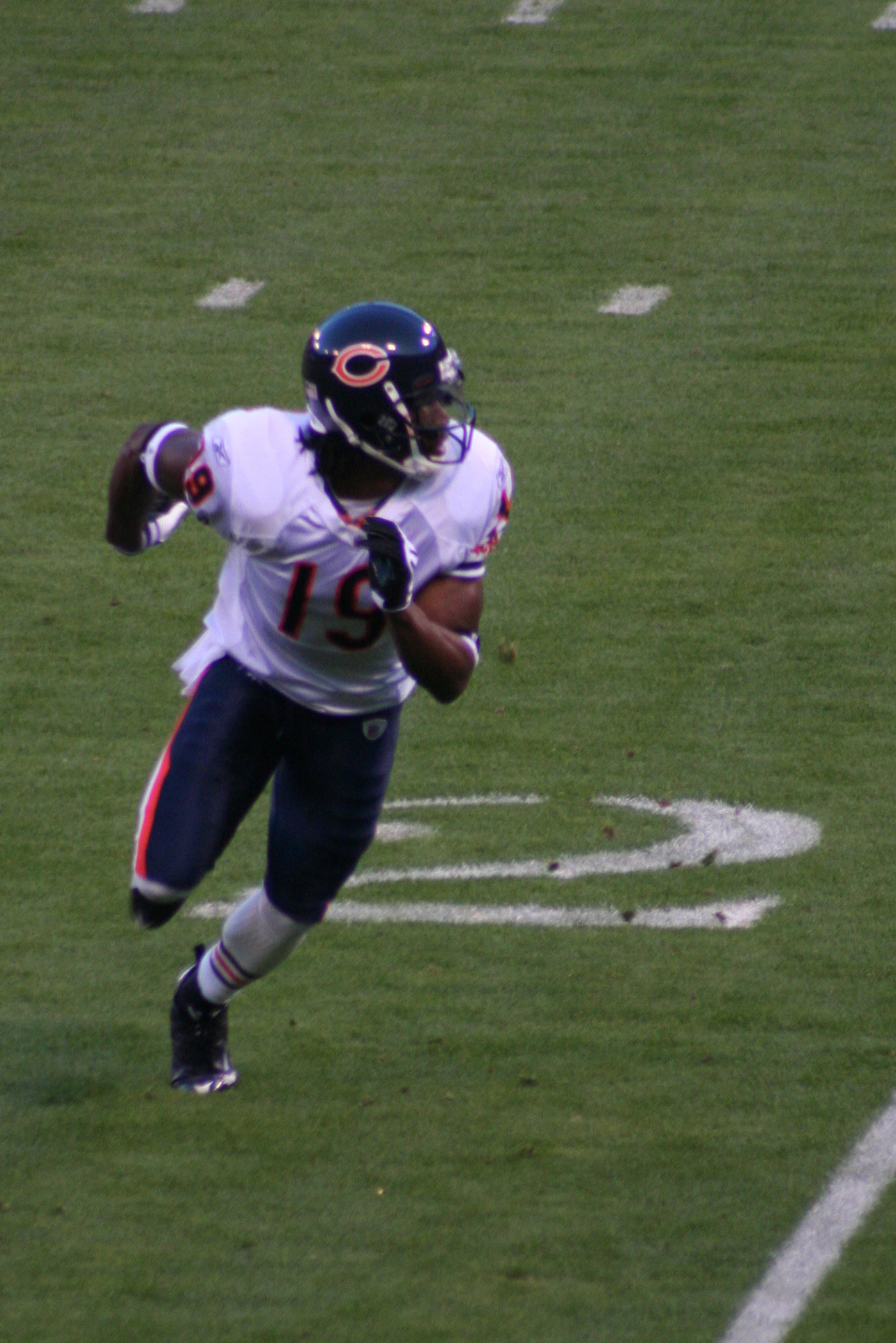
- Aromashodu with the Chicago Bears in 2009

No. 19, 80
- Position: Wide receiver

Personal information
- Born: May 23, 1984 (age 42); Miami, Florida, U.S.
- Listed height: 6 ft 2 in (1.88 m)
- Listed weight: 201 lb (91 kg)

Career information
- High school: Miami Springs (Miami Springs, Florida)
- College: Auburn (2002–2005)
- NFL draft: 2006: 7th round, 233rd overall pick

Career history
- Miami Dolphins (2006)*; Indianapolis Colts (2006–2007)*; Houston Texans (2007)*; Indianapolis Colts (2007); Washington Redskins (2008)*; Chicago Bears (2008–2010); Minnesota Vikings (2011–2012); Chicago Bears (2013)*
- * Offseason or practice squad member only

Awards and highlights
- Super Bowl champion (XLI)

Career NFL statistics
- Receptions: 78
- Receiving yards: 1,193
- Receiving touchdowns: 5
- Stats at Pro Football Reference

Gbolahan Devin Aromashodu (uh-ROHM-uh-shuh-doo; born May 23, 1984) is an American former professional football player who was a wide receiver in the National Football League (NFL). He was selected by the Miami Dolphins in the seventh round of the 2006 NFL draft. He played college football for the Auburn Tigers.

Aromashodu was also a member of the Indianapolis Colts, Houston Texans, Washington Redskins, Chicago Bears, and Minnesota Vikings.

== Early life ==
Aromashodu was born and raised in Miami, Florida. His father, who immigrated to the United States from Nigeria, was deeply fond of football, but was reluctant to let his son play. Aromashodu eventually convinced his father to let him join a youth football team, where he surprised his father by becoming one of the team's best players. Aromashodu attended Miami Springs High School, where he was a three-sport star in football, basketball and track. In football, he played as a wide receiver, defensive back and kickoff returner. As a junior, he caught 29 passes for 620 yards and seven touchdowns and returned two kickoffs for touchdowns. As a senior, he caught 17 passes for 417 yards and four touchdowns and rushed for 372 yards and four scores on offense, while also totaled 45 tackles and one interception on defense. He frequently played against future teammate Devin Hester.

Also a standout track and field athlete, Aromashodu was one of the state's top sprinters. At the 2002 FHSAA State T&F Championships, he earned second-place finishes in both 100-meter dash (10.62 s) and 200-meter dash (22.28 s) events. In addition, he also ran a 4.4-second 40-yard dash, bench-pressed 250 lb, squatted 285 and had a 42-inch vertical jump.

=== College career ===
Aromashodu expressed interest in attending North Carolina State, Auburn University, and Florida. After much deliberation, he chose to play for Auburn. Devin played a critical role in Auburn's offense during three of the four years he spent there, logging 71 catches for 1,333 yards and 9 touchdowns in 51 games with the Tigers.

== Professional career ==
Pre-draft measurables
Height	Weight	Arm length	Hand span	40-yard dash	10-yard split	20-yard split	20-yard shuttle	Three-cone drill	Vertical jump	Broad jump
6 ft 2 1/2 in (1.89 m)	201 lb (91 kg)	32 3/4 in (0.83 m)	9 1/8 in (0.23 m)	4.35 s	1.53 s	2.55 s	4.16 s	7.04 s	39 in (0.99 m)	10 ft 0 in (3.05 m)
All values from NFL Combine

=== Miami Dolphins ===
After being selected by the Miami Dolphins with the 233rd overall pick in the seventh round of the 2006 NFL draft, Aromashodu failed to make the team's opening day roster.

=== Indianapolis Colts ===
After being cut from the Dolphins, Aromashodu would begin his early career as a practice squad member for a number of NFL teams. A member of the Indianapolis Colts and Houston Texans's practice teams in 2007, Devin was signed to the active roster of the Colts on November 14, 2007. He would make appearances in six regular season games that season, amassing 96 yards on seven receptions.

=== Washington Redskins ===
Aromashodu was later waived by the Colts on August 7, 2008, and soon signed with the Washington Redskins practice squad.

=== Chicago Bears (first stint) ===
After remaining on the inactive list during his first year with the Chicago Bears, Jay Cutler lobbied to the team's offensive coordinator, Ron Turner, to give Aromashodu playing time.

He caught his first pass as a Bear on November 12, 2009, against the San Francisco 49ers. Aromashodu began to play a larger role in the team's offense after wide receiver Devin Hester was sidelined with a calf injury. He caught his first NFL career touchdown from Cutler on December 13, against the Green Bay Packers. Aromashodu played an integral part in the Bears Monday Night Football upset victory over the Minnesota Vikings, catching seven passes for 150 yards, including the game-winning touchdown in overtime. During the 2009 season finale, Aromashodu caught two touchdowns and amassed 46 yards on five receptions in a 37–23 win over the Detroit Lions. He finished the season with 24 catches, 298 yards, and four receiving touchdowns.

His remarkable finish sparked criticism of the Bears' front office regarding why it took until Week 14 for Aromashodu to see significant playing time. Former Bears offensive coordinator Ron Turner responded, "[Aromashodu] got hurt in the last preseason game. He hurt his hamstring, and he was out a couple weeks. When he came back, he wasn't back 100 percent. When he got back to the point that he was practicing at full speed and playing, we started to get him in the lineup. Could we have done it a couple weeks earlier? Possibly. But once he got healthy and started playing well in practice, we started getting him in the mix."

=== Minnesota Vikings ===
On July 26, 2011, Aromashodu and the Vikings came to agreement on a one-year contract. He caught 26 passes for 468 yards and one touchdown during the season, while starting six games. He became an unrestricted free agent Following the 2011 NFL season, but signed a 1-year to contract to remain with the Vikings on March 23, 2012. He caught 11 passes for 182 yards in the 2012 season.

=== Chicago Bears (second stint) ===
On June 10, 2013, Aromashodu returned to the Bears. On August 25, 2013, Aromashadu was released in a wave of preseason roster cuts.
