= Christi Fraga =

American politician and mayor of Doral

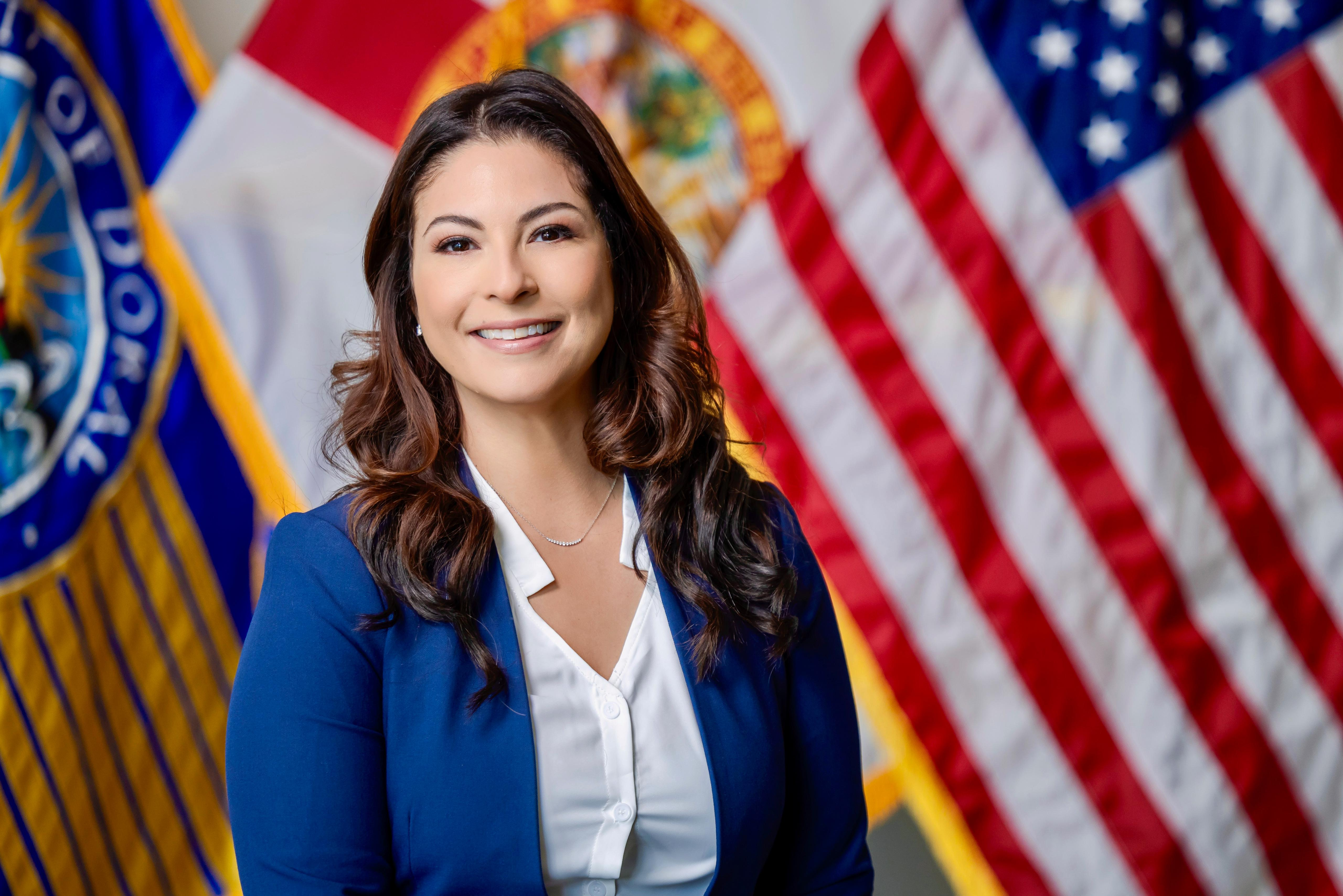

Mayor of Doral
- Incumbent
- Assumed office 2022
- Preceded by: Juan Carlos Bermudez

Personal details
- Party: Republican
- Website: www.christifraga.com

Christi Fraga (born December 22, 1986) is a Cuban-American politician who has served as mayor of Doral, Florida, since 2022. Fraga was re-elected in 2024 with over 79% of the vote.

== Early life and education ==
Fraga has lived in Doral for more than two decades. She earned an associate degree in Business Administration from Miami Dade College and a bachelor's degree in Financial Management and Accounting from Florida International University. In 2014, she completed the Good Government Initiative's Leaders in Excellence program at the University of Miami.

== Early career ==
Fraga was elected to the Doral City Council in 2012 and later served as vice mayor during three of her eight years on the council. In 2013, she proposed the creation of a Youth Advisory Board to increase student civic involvement; the council established the board that year.

In 2020, Fraga was elected to the Miami-Dade County School Board (District 5).

== Mayor of Doral ==
Fraga won a December 2022 runoff to become Doral's first female mayor. She was re-elected in 2024.

During her mayoral term, the city opened major phases of Doral Central Park in 2024–2025 following voter-approved bond work. The administration also advanced transportation planning to expand the city's trolley network and update the transit plan.

=== Pension reform ===
In 2023, the City Council voted to move toward repealing a lifetime pension program for elected officials and to suspend payments while a new ordinance was prepared; the vote was unanimous. Former officials subsequently sued. In October 2024, a Miami-Dade Circuit Court judge ruled that the city had not followed the required procedures to terminate benefits already being paid and ordered the city to use the proper mechanism; the ruling did not affect the city's ability to eliminate the program for future officeholders. In 2024, Fraga urged four former officials to return payments they had received and to drop their lawsuit.

== Politics and views ==
In April 2025, the Doral City Council approved a cooperation agreement under a federal immigration enforcement program. According to Fraga, the agreement was intended to comply with existing law; she stated the city would continue to treat all residents with respect.

== Personal life ==
Fraga lives in Doral with her family.
