= Luigi Boria =

American politician

2nd Mayor of Doral, Florida
- In office November 2012 – December 2016
- Preceded by: Juan Carlos Bermudez
- Succeeded by: Juan Carlos Bermudez

Personal details
- Born: April 23, 1958 (age 68) Caracas, Venezuela
- Party: Republican
- Spouse: Graciela Boria
- Children: 2
- Education: Andrés Bello Catholic University
- Occupation: Businessman, politician

Luigi Boria (born April 23, 1958) is a Venezuelan-born American politician who served as mayor of Doral, Florida from 2012 to 2016. Boria defeated former Miami-Dade School Board member Frank Bolaños in the 2012 elections, obtaining 54% of the vote.

== Biography ==
Boria, who is also an evangelical Christian pastor, was born in Caracas in 1958 to Italian parents who emigrated to that country. He studied accounting at the Andrés Bello Catholic University, a private institution, in 1982. In 1989 he left Venezuela to settle in Doral, Florida, where he currently lives. Boria has run various companies in both Venezuela and the United States since the 1980s.

He was elected mayor of Doral in the 2012 elections as a non-partisan, becoming the second Venezuelan to be elected mayor in the US, after Philip Giordano, of Waterbury, Connecticut.

Boria was investigated for corruption in 2015 after renting a campaign office at an extremely high price compared to the market price, but was not charged. Boria gave the key to the city to future President Donald Trump in March 2015, after he brought the Miss Universe 2015 (although it ultimately did not take place) to Doral, and supported his candidacy.

Boria lost reelection to former mayor Juan Carlos Bermúdez in the 2016 elections. Boria got 33% of the vote in the first round, but lost in the second round, in which Mayor Bermúdez reached 66% of the vote. Since 2016, Boria has been a member of the Miami-Dade Beacon Council.
