= Juan Carlos Bermudez =

American politician

3rd Mayor of Doral, Florida
- In office 2016–2022
- Preceded by: Luigi Boria
- Succeeded by: Christi Fraga

1st Mayor of Doral
- In office 2003–2012
- Succeeded by: Luigi Boria

Personal details
- Born: February 20, 1962 Cuba
- Education: Notre Dame Law
- Occupation: Attorney

Juan Carlos 'JC' Bermudez (born February 20, 1962) is an American attorney and Florida politician serving as County Commissioner to District 12, Miami-Dade County. Prior to this election, he was the first and third mayor of the city of Doral.

He was succeeded in 2012 by entrepreneur and ordained minister, Luigi Boria.
