= Ronald W. Reagan/Doral Senior High School =

Location
- 8600 NW 107th Ave; Doral, Florida 33178; United States; 25.85259°N 80.37146°W

Information
- School type: Public, high school
- Established: August 2006
- School district: Miami-Dade County Public Schools
- Principal: Dr. Dillon Williams
- Teaching staff: 51.00 (FTE)
- Grades: 9–12
- Enrollment: 1,313 (2023–2024)
- Student to teacher ratio: 25.75
- Campus type: Small City
- Colors: Navy Blue, Forest Green, and Gold
- Mascot: Bison
- Website: https://ronaldwreagandoralshs.net/

Ronald W. Reagan/Doral Senior High School is a secondary school located at 8600 NW 107 Avenue, in Doral, Florida, United States, a Miami suburb; its principal is Dr. Dillon Williams. The school offers, alongside Advanced Placement courses, International General Certificate of Secondary Education (IGCSE) courses, Advanced Subsidiary (AS) courses, and A-level courses, which are international examinations valid across the world.

Within its attendance boundary are portions of Doral and the residential areas in Medley.

== History ==
The school's construction broke ground on February 1, 2005. It was built as a relief school for overcrowded Miami Springs Senior High School, which used to the serve the area. The school was also opened to relieve a distance problem, as high school students would have to commute seven to nine miles (14 km) to reach Miami Springs High School. It was named after Ronald Reagan, a former President of the United States. It opened with 815 students. The first principal, Douglas Rodriguez, was the former principal at Miami Springs.

The campus is located on 20 acres (81,000 m^{2}), has a capacity of about 2,000 students, and contains approximately 250,000 square feet (23,000 m^{2}) of space. Outdoor facilities include football, softball, baseball and soccer fields, as well as basketball, racquetball, and tennis courts. The facilities also include an 800-seat auditorium, a 700-seat cafeteria, a state-of-the-art Media Center, and an indoor gymnasium. The school opened its doors to students on August 14, 2006. In the 2008–2009 school year, 12th-grade students located within the boundaries of the school who used to be zoned to Miami Springs Senior High School were zoned to Reagan/Doral, making this the first year that the school had all four grade levels (9-12). Reagan/Doral's first graduating class was the class of 2009.

Reagan/Doral's athletic rivals are Miami Springs High School and Doral Academy Charter High School. A more informal rival is Mater Academy Charter School. At the 2007 homecoming pep rally, the classes of 2009, 2010, and 2011 named the mascot "Tyson D. Bison." (formerly known as Tyson Bison)

The school yearbook is Tatanka ("American Bison" in the Lakota language) and the monthly free newspaper is the Reagan Advocate.

In 2011-2020 due to overcrowding of students Reagan moved 9th graders to South Campus at the former Doral Middle School Building until the new JC Bermudez High School Opened in the fall of 2020.

In February 2008, the City of Doral Trolley began service to Reagan/Doral.

On December 12, 2008, Douglas Rodriguez's tenure as principal of the school ended and he became principal of Miami Central High School.

The current principal is Dr. Dillon Williams.

== Campus ==
The school has a mural honoring two students and former students who died in automobile accidents: 21-year old Andrea Castillo, a member of the Class of 2009 who died in 2012; and 17-year old Raphael Acevedo, a fourth-year student (senior) who died in 2014. Area artist Tony Mendoza designed the murals in 2016.

== Academic achievements ==
- The State's Accountability program grades a school by a complex formula that looks at both current scores and annual improvement on the Reading, Math, Writing and Science FCATs.
- 2006-2007: A
- 2007-2008: A
- 2017-2018: C
- 2018-2019: A
- Reagan/Doral was the only non-magnet high school within the Miami-Dade County Public School system to receive an A grade for its opening school year (2006–2007). School ranking is based on student FCAT performance.
- It is also the only school in Miami-Dade County Public Schools' history, thus far, to have received an A grade for its opening year.

== School clubs ==
Since the first graduation in 2009, Ronald Reagan Doral Senior High TV production (RTV) has recorded all school graduations done out of Florida International University, including those of other schools. RTV began recording other schools' graduations after it discovered that nobody else was filming them.

== See also ==
- Miami-Dade County Public Schools
- Education in the United States
