= Medley, Florida =

Town in the state of Florida, United States

- Town
- Town of Medley
- Flag Seal
- Motto: "The perfect place for industrial development"
- Location in Miami-Dade County and the state of Florida

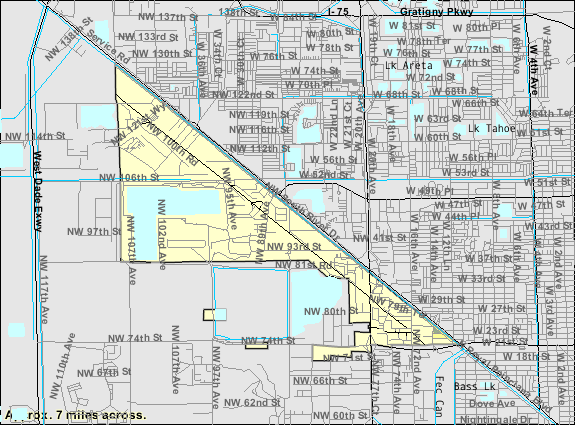
- U.S. Census Bureau map showing town boundaries
- Coordinates: 25°52′50″N 80°21′48″W
- Country: United States
- State: Florida
- County: Miami-Dade
- Settled: 1905
- Incorporated: May 1, 1949

Government
  - Type: Mayor-Council
  - Mayor: Ana “Lily” Stefano
  - Vice Mayor: Arturo “Artie” Jinete
  - Councilpersons: Lizelh Rodriguez, Edgar Ayala, and Lourdes Rodriguez
  - Town Clerk: Victoria Martinez
  - Town Attorney: Michael A. Pizzi Jr.

Area
  - Total: 5.98 sq mi (15.48 km^{2})
  - Land: 5.08 sq mi (13.17 km^{2})
  - Water: 0.89 sq mi (2.31 km^{2}) 12.09%
- Elevation: 3 ft (0.91 m)

Population (2020)
  - Total: 1,056
  - Density: 208/sq mi (80.2/km^{2})
- Time zone: UTC-5 (EST)
  - Summer (DST): UTC-4 (EDT)
- ZIP Codes: 33178, 33166
- Area codes: 305, 786, 645
- FIPS code: 12-43900
- GNIS feature ID: 2406140
- Website: www.townofmedley.com

Medley is a town in Miami-Dade County, Florida, United States. The town is part of the Miami metropolitan area of South Florida. As of the 2020 census, the population was at 1,056.

== History ==
The community was named after its founder, Sylvester Medley. The Town of Medley was officially incorporated as a municipality on May 1, 1949, but Sylvester had settled the current town in 1905, and farmed there until his death in 1950. Located in the western part of the county, its primary tax base is industrial development, explaining its small population and high density. The town is home to a Rinker plant, one of its largest businesses. It is also home to the Titan America Pennsuco Cement Plant.

== Geography ==
The approximate coordinates for the Town of Medley is located 12 miles (19 km) northwest of downtown Miami.

It is bordered to the north by Hialeah Gardens and to the east by Hialeah. Doral is to the south. The Miami Canal forms the border between Medley and the cities of Hialeah Gardens and Hialeah.

According to the United States Census Bureau, the town has a total area of 6.0 square miles (16 km^{2}). 5.1 square miles (13 km^{2}) of it are land and 0.9 square miles (2.3 km^{2}) of it (14.95%) are water.

=== Surrounding areas ===
- Hialeah Gardens, Hialeah
- Unincorporated Miami-Dade County Hialeah Gardens, Hialeah
- Unincorporated Miami-Dade County Hialeah Gardens, Hialeah
- Unincorporated Miami-Dade County Miami Springs
- Doral

=== Climate ===
The Town of Medley has a tropical climate, similar to the climate found in much of the Caribbean. It is part of the only region in the 48 contiguous states that falls under that category. More specifically, it generally has a tropical savanna climate (Köppen climate classification: Aw), bordering a tropical monsoon climate (Köppen climate classification: Am).

== Demographics ==
Historical population
Census	Pop.	Note	%±
1950	106		—
1960	112		5.7%
1970	351		213.4%
1980	537		53.0%
1990	663		23.5%
2000	1,098		65.6%
2010	838		−23.7%
2020	1,056		26.0%
U.S. Decennial Census

=== Racial and ethnic composition ===
Medley racial composition (Hispanics excluded from racial categories) (NH = Non-Hispanic)
Race	Pop 2010	Pop 2020	% 2010	% 2020
White (NH)	62	43	7.40%	4.07%
Black or African American (NH)	0	1	0.00%	0.09%
Native American or Alaska Native (NH)	0	0	0.00%	0.00%
Asian (NH)	0	0	0.00%	0.00%
Pacific Islander or Native Hawaiian (NH)	0	0	0.00%	0.00%
Some other race (NH)	0	2	0.00%	0.19%
Two or more races/Multiracial (NH)	3	2	0.36%	0.19%
Hispanic or Latino (any race)	773	1,008	92.24%	95.45%
Total	838	1,056		

=== 2020 census ===
As of the 2020 census, Medley had a population of 1,056. The median age was 51.6 years. 12.7% of residents were under the age of 18 and 28.6% of residents were 65 years of age or older. For every 100 females there were 95.9 males, and for every 100 females age 18 and over there were 92.9 males age 18 and over.

100.0% of residents lived in urban areas, while 0.0% lived in rural areas.

There were 388 households in Medley, of which 22.9% had children under the age of 18 living in them. Of all households, 38.9% were married-couple households, 21.1% were households with a male householder and no spouse or partner present, and 32.5% were households with a female householder and no spouse or partner present. About 21.6% of all households were made up of individuals and 12.7% had someone living alone who was 65 years of age or older.

There were 422 housing units, of which 8.1% were vacant. The homeowner vacancy rate was 1.6% and the rental vacancy rate was 5.3%.

The United States Census Bureau's 2016-2020 American Community Survey estimated that there were 255 families in Medley.

=== 2010 census ===
As of the 2010 census, there were 838 people, 287 households, and 227 families residing in the town.

=== 2000 census ===
In 2000, 34.7% had children under the age of 18 living with them, 54.3% were married couples living together, 12.7% had a female householder with no husband present, and 26.4% were non-families. 20.7% of all households were made up of individuals, and 9.1% had someone living alone who was 65 years of age or older. The average household size was 2.76 and the average family size was 3.15.

In 2000, the town population was spread out, with 23.7% under the age of 18, 4.9% from 18 to 24, 29.1% from 25 to 44, 26.7% from 45 to 64, and 15.6% who were 65 years of age or older. The median age was 40 years. For every 100 females, there were 100.0 males. For every 100 females age 18 and over, there were 101.4 males.

In 2000, the median income for a household in the town was $23,167, and the median income for a family was $25,909. Males had a median income of $26,964 versus $18,409 for females. The per capita income for the town was $11,955. About 14.3% of families and 20.0% of the population were below the poverty line, including 16.0% of those under age 18 and 33.5% of those age 65 or over. New households (condominiums) are being constructed along the Miami River in order to raise house quality.

As of 2000, speakers of Spanish as a first language accounted for 83.65%, and English as a mother tongue made up 16.35% of the population.

== Education ==
Medley is in the Miami-Dade County Public Schools system. Residents are zoned to Ronald W. Reagan/Doral Senior High School.
