= Doral, Florida =

- City
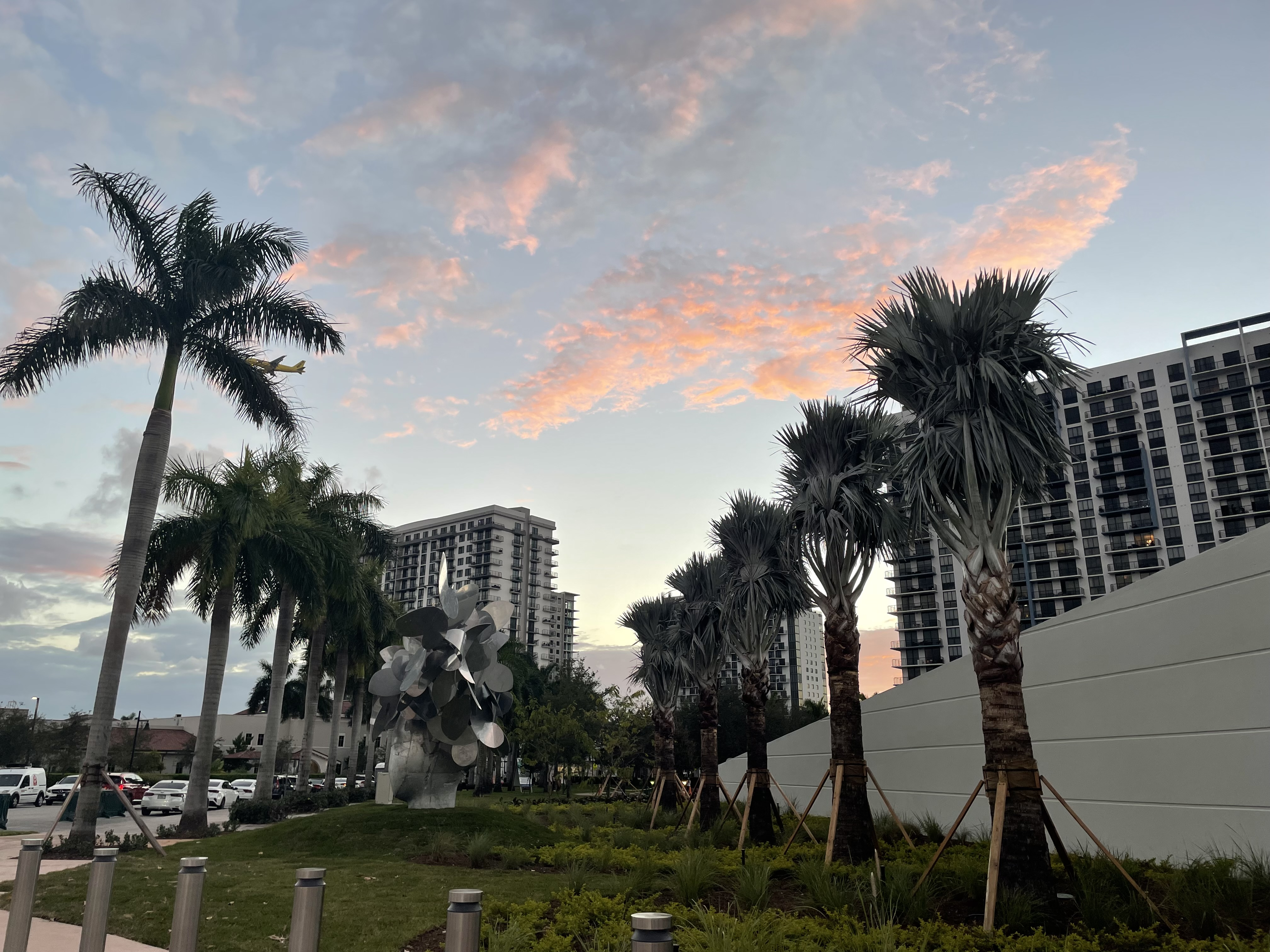
- Downtown Doral

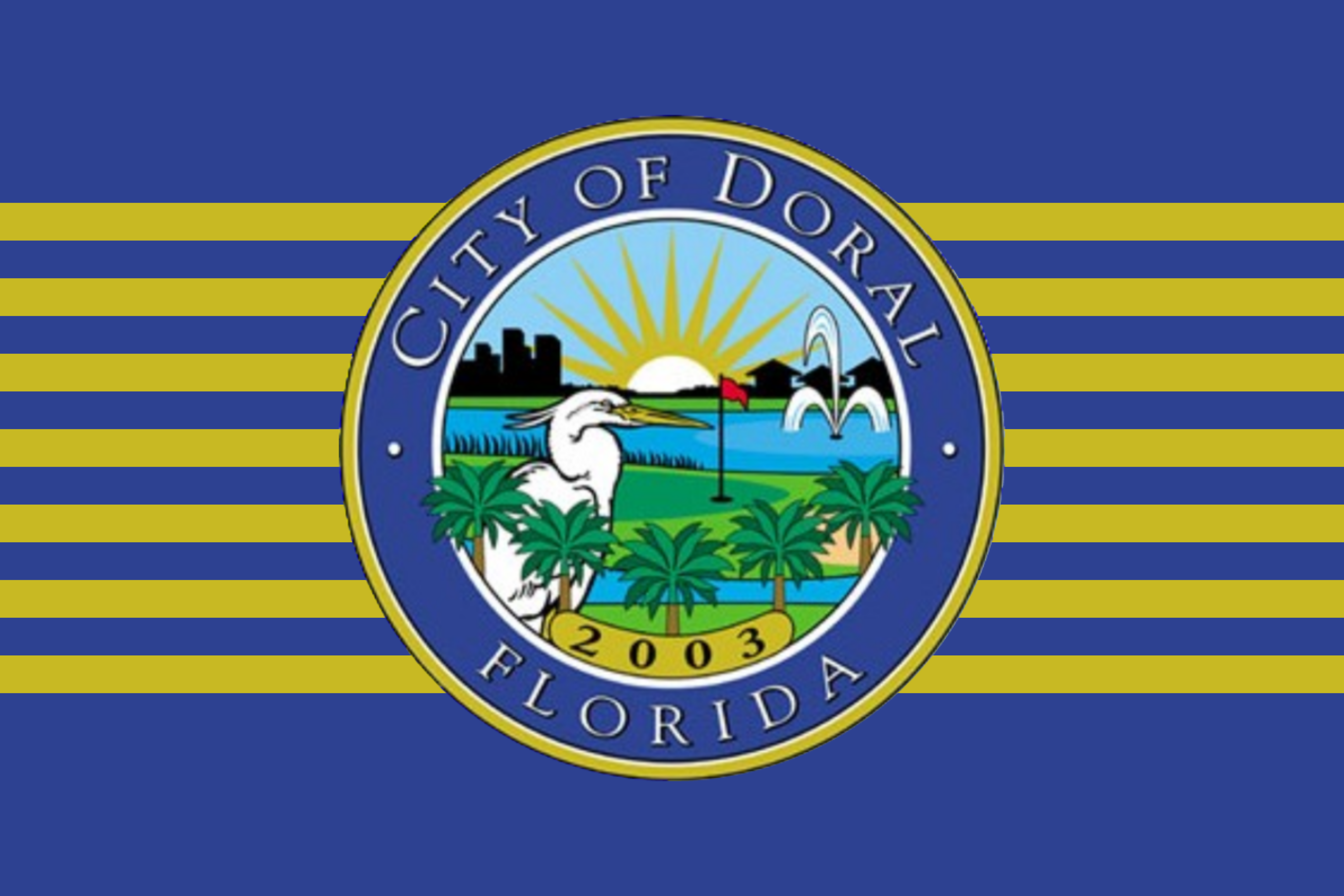
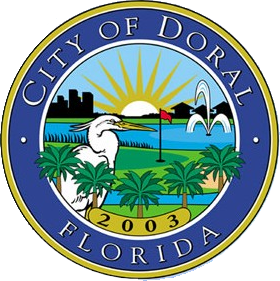
- Flag Seal
- Motto: "Live, Work, Learn and Play!"
- Location in Miami-Dade County and the state of Florida
- Coordinates: 25°49′26″N 80°22′18″W
- Country: United States
- State: Florida
- County: Miami-Dade
- Incorporated: June 24, 2003

Government
  - Type: Council-Manager
  - Mayor: Christi Fraga (R)
  - Councilman/Vice mayor: Rafael Pineyro
  - Councilmembers: Maureen PorrasNicole Reinoso, and Peter Espinosa,
  - City manager: Zeida Sardiñas
  - City clerk: Connie Diaz

Area
  - Total: 15.08 sq mi (39.05 km^{2})
  - Land: 13.83 sq mi (35.83 km^{2})
  - Water: 1.24 sq mi (3.22 km^{2}) 3.52%
- Elevation: 0 ft (0 m)

Population (2020)
  - Total: 75,874
  - Density: 5,484.7/sq mi (2,117.64/km^{2})
- Time zone: UTC−5 (EST)
  - Summer (DST): UTC−4 (EDT)
- ZIP Codes: 33122, 33126, 33166, 33172, 33178
- Area codes: 305, 786, 645
- FIPS code: 12-17935
- GNIS feature ID: 2404236
- Website: www.cityofdoral.com

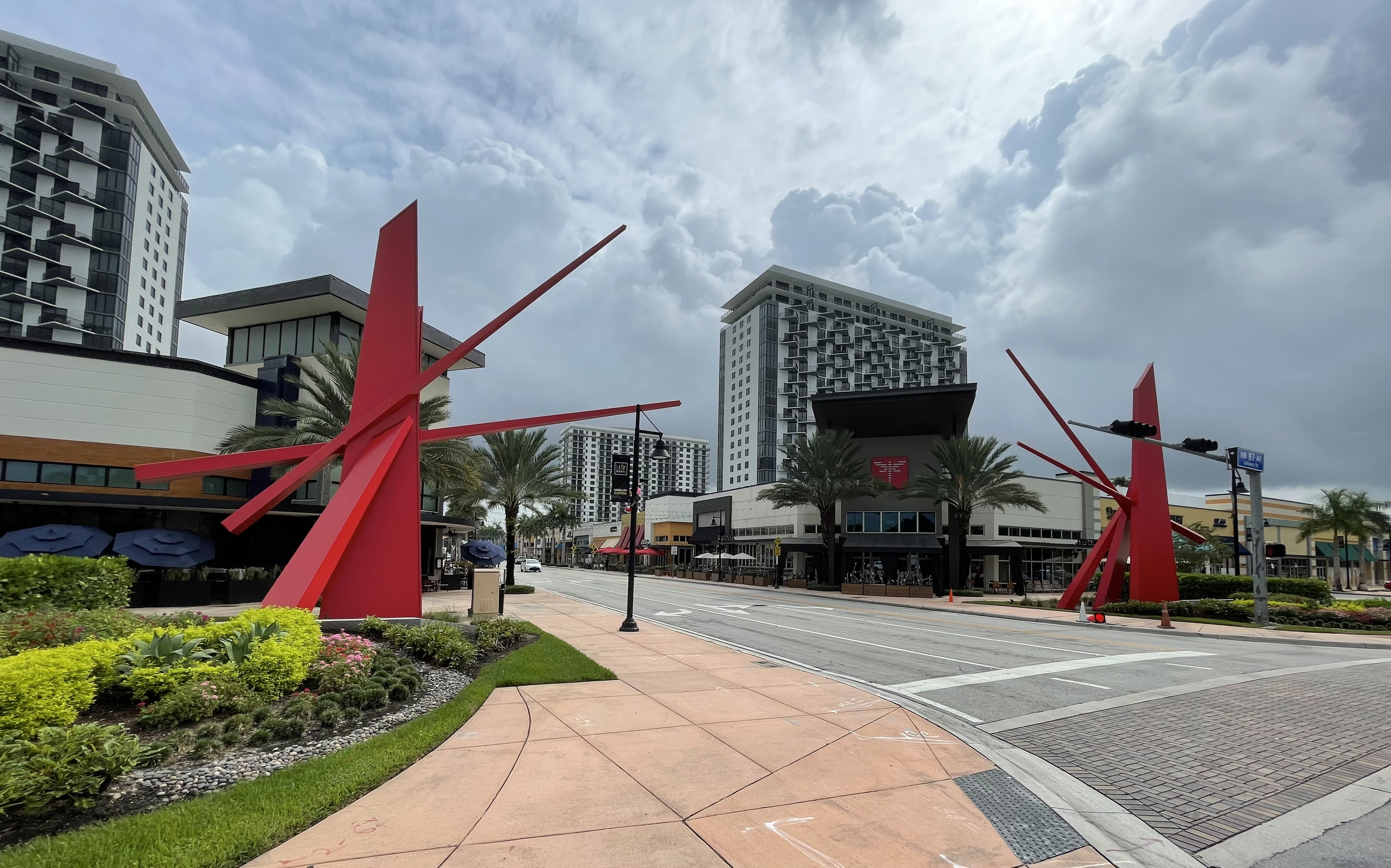
Downtown Doral, the city's new urban core

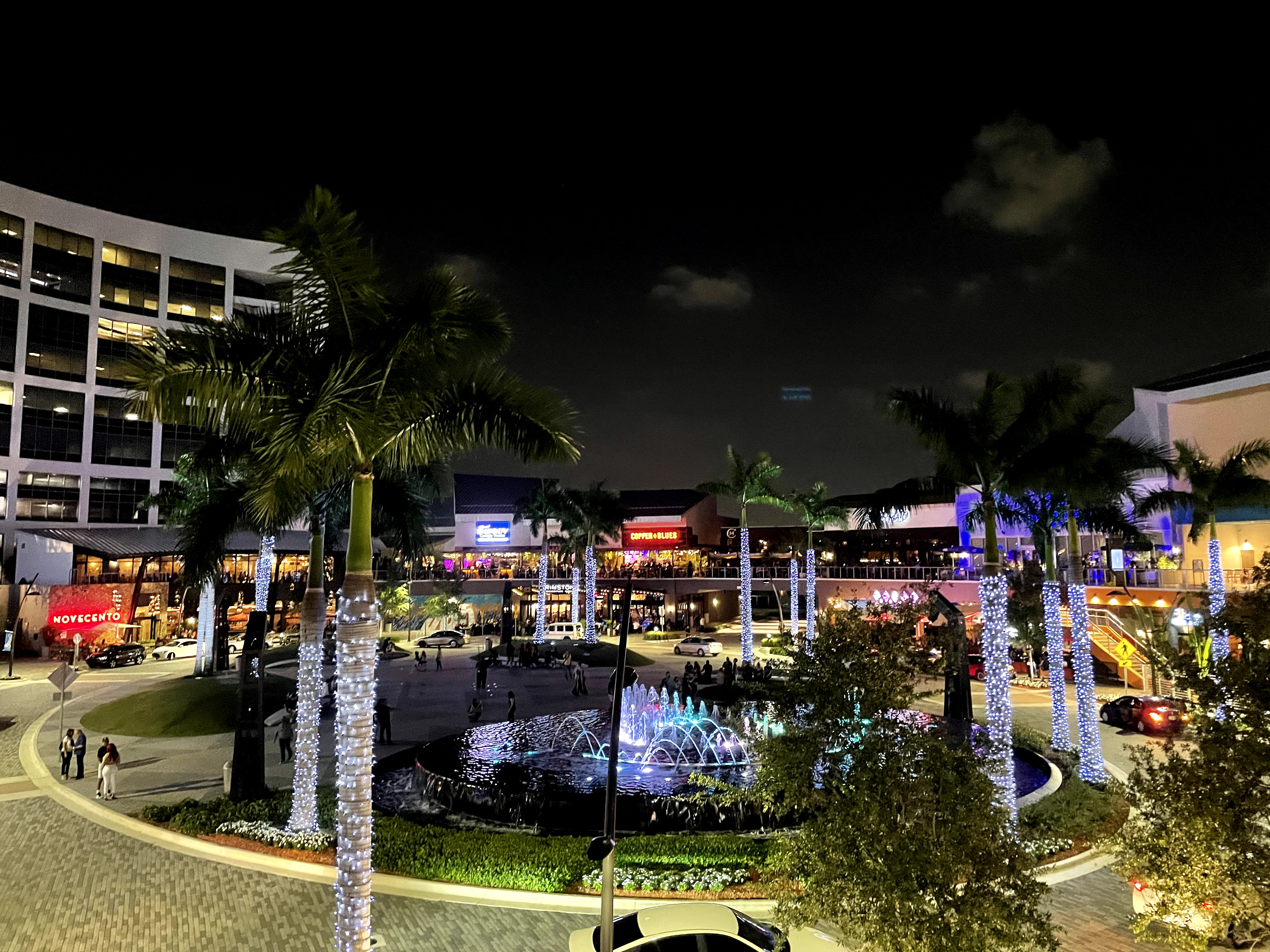
View of CityPlace Doral in the east of the city

Doral is a city in Miami-Dade County, Florida, United States. One of 34 municipalities in the county, it is a principal city in the Miami metropolitan area that is located 5 miles (8 km) west of Miami International Airport and 13 miles (21 km) west of Downtown Miami. Doral occupies 15 square miles (39 km^{2}) bordered on the west by the Ronald Reagan Turnpike and the Florida Everglades, on the north by the town of Medley, on the east by the Palmetto Expressway and on the south by the Dolphin Expressway and the city of Sweetwater. The city is part of the Miami metropolitan area of South Florida. As of the 2020 census, Doral had a population of 75,874, up from 45,704 in 2010.

Doral has operated under the mayor-council-manager form of government since incorporation. Policymaking and legislative authority are vested in a governing council consisting of the mayor and four other councilmembers. The council, which is elected at large, is responsible for passing ordinances and resolutions, adopting the annual budget, and appointing the city manager, city clerk and city attorney. The city manager is responsible for carrying out the council's policies and ordinances, overseeing the government's daily operations, and appointing the heads of various departments.

For a city of its size, Doral has many shops, financial institutions and businesses, especially importers and exporters, primarily because of its proximity to the airport. In 2008, Fortune Small Business and CNN Money ranked Doral 51st on a list of 100 cities with the best mix of business advantages and lifestyle appeal. The city was named a 2019 All-America City Award finalist and one of the "Best Places to Live" in 2018 by Money magazine.

== History ==
In the late 1950s, real estate pioneers Alfred and Doris Kaskel purchased 2,400 acres (9.7 km^{2}) of swampland between Northwest 36 Street and Northwest 74 Street and from Northwest 79 Avenue to Northwest 117 Avenue for about $49,000, intending to build a golf course and hotel. In 1962, the Doral Country Club opened in western Dade County, featuring the blue, red, and par-3 golf courses, along with a hotel on Miami Beach. The "Doral" name is a combination of Doris and Alfred's names. As Doral's first structure, the Doral Hotel, and Country Club became the area's hot spot: guests were transported from the beach to the country club for a day on the golf course.

In the second year of operations, the Kaskels hosted the first Doral Open Invitational, Florida's major PGA event. Alfred offered $50,000 in prize money to attract well-known golfers and add credibility to the course. According to the South Florida Golf Foundation, at the time, only three other tournaments were held in Florida, offering a combined total of $65,000 prize money.

By the early 1980s, Doral experienced its first residential growth spurt, when Alfred's and Doris' grandson Bill developed Doral Estates, followed by a joint venture with Lennar to build Doral Park. Both communities were named after the hotel, a trend that was to be repeated many more times. Although younger families started flooding the area, there were no stores, schools, or parks. Initially, most new homes were investment properties or second homes, but early full-time residents started coming together as a community.

From 1983 to 1985, Miami-Dade County imposed a building moratorium to protect the area's water wells. Once the ban was lifted, Doral experienced tremendous growth. In 1989, Morgan Levy helped organize the West Dade Federation of Homeowner Associations to stand strong against proposals that threatened the community's welfare. Thus, they secured a police station instead of a jail and convinced county officials to implement higher development standards and more lighting, roads, and landscaping.

In 1995, residents began lobbying for incorporation in earnest, dissatisfied with the high tax rate relative to the services they received, as well as unchecked growth. The county met the first attempt at incorporation with a year's deferral. Some classified Doral as a "donor community", meaning that the taxes paid were more than the cost of operations. With the deferral, incorporation efforts intensified even more. In 1996, the community elected its first community council: Jose "Pepe" Cancio Sr., Mario Pita, and Barbara B. Thomas were elected, and three other members were appointed. The council initially met once every month.

In 2002, Governor Jeb Bush appointed Cancio to fill the remainder of Miami-Dade Commissioner Miriam Alonso's term of office. Doral residents hoped that his appointment would bring the community closer to incorporation, and their hopes were realized. Although Cancio endorsed Juan Carlos Bermudez, the City of Doral's first elected Mayor, as his replacement on the Community Council, Bermudez declined the offer, ran for the seat, and was elected. At the time, Bermudez was president of One Doral, a civic organization formed to counteract the perceived influence of the West Dade Federation on the new Council. However, both One Doral and the West Dade Federation proved essential to the incorporation process.

In January 2003, following a seven-year battle, 85% of Doral's voters voted in favor of incorporation. In June of the same year, 92% voted to accept the city charter, and elected their first mayor and city council.

The new City of Doral was named as an attractive location for entrepreneurs with an interest in the Latin America market. Mayor Luigi Boria, elected in November 2012, became the second Venezuelan-American mayor in the United States. He was replaced by Juan Carlos Bermudez who won a reelection bid in 2016. Mayor Bermudez was again reelected in November 2020 with 69.85% of votes for four more years to lead the community.

On December 13, 2022, during a run-off election, Doral voters made history by electing Doral's first female mayor, Christi Fraga, with 54.5% of the votes.

In 2025, Trump National Doral Miami was chosen to host the 2026 G20 Miami summit. The announcement was made by Miami Mayor Francis Suarez in the Oval Office and later confirmed by Doral Mayor Christi Fraga.

== Media ==
Doral Community Newspapers, which is published bi-weekly and is part of Miami Community Newspapers, is one of the local publications in Doral. Another long-standing publication is Doral Family Journal, also published bi-weekly.

Two big media outlets have their headquarters in Doral: Univision Network/Fusion and CBS-owned and operated affiliate WFOR-TV, Channel 4. Several studios and other TV operations work out of Doral. The Telemundo chain has a presence in the city, with one of its main office and production units located there.

== Geography ==
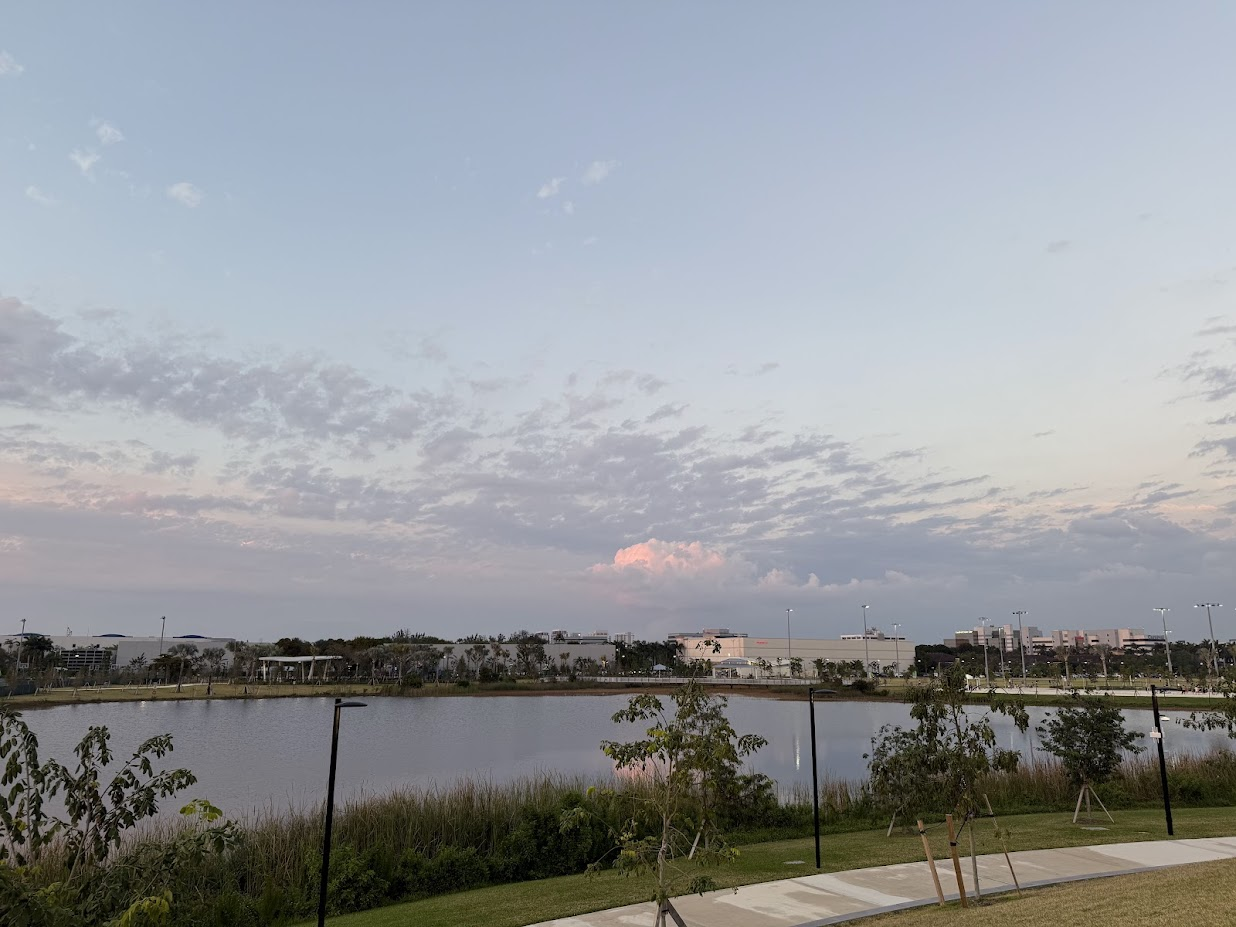
Doral Central Park in the afternoon

According to the United States Census Bureau, the city has a total area of 15.08 square miles (39.1 km^{2}). 13.85 square miles (35.9 km^{2}) of it are land and 1.23 square miles (3.2 km^{2}) of it (8.14%) are water.

=== Surrounding areas ===
Town of Medley
Unincorporated Miami-Dade County Hialeah
Unincorporated Miami-Dade County, Tamiami Miami Springs
Tamiami West Miami
Fontainebleau

=== Climate ===
According to the Köppen climate classification, Doral has a tropical monsoon climate (Am) bordering a tropical savanna climate (Aw).

Doral has hot-humid summers with the heat index regularly surpassing 100 °F (37 °C) and higher. The rainy season in Doral runs from May through October when the majority of the city's rainfall occurs. Winters are short, dry, and warm with occasional dips in temperatures during the passage of cold fronts.

Climate data for Doral, Florida, 2006–2020 normals, extremes 2003–present
Month	Jan	Feb	Mar	Apr	May	Jun	Jul	Aug	Sep	Oct	Nov	Dec	Year
Record high °F (°C)	90 (32)	92 (33)	93 (34)	96 (36)	98 (37)	98 (37)	98 (37)	99 (37)	98 (37)	97 (36)	93 (34)	90 (32)	99 (37)
Mean daily maximum °F (°C)	78.3 (25.7)	79.2 (26.2)	81.6 (27.6)	83.7 (28.7)	85.6 (29.8)	90.9 (32.7)	91.6 (33.1)	92.0 (33.3)	91.1 (32.8)	87.2 (30.7)	82.1 (27.8)	79.5 (26.4)	85.2 (29.6)
Mean daily minimum °F (°C)	61.5 (16.4)	63.5 (17.5)	65.7 (18.7)	70.3 (21.3)	73.2 (22.9)	76.7 (24.8)	77.1 (25.1)	78.0 (25.6)	77.1 (25.1)	74.2 (23.4)	68.3 (20.2)	65.4 (18.6)	70.9 (21.6)
Record low °F (°C)	35 (2)	38 (3)	44 (7)	53 (12)	56 (13)	63 (17)	65 (18)	66 (19)	61 (16)	51 (11)	45 (7)	36 (2)	35 (2)
Average precipitation inches (mm)	1.41 (36)	1.37 (35)	1.26 (32)	3.08 (78)	5.86 (149)	10.39 (264)	8.94 (227)	10.23 (260)	11.84 (301)	8.86 (225)	3.29 (84)	2.60 (66)	69.13 (1,757)
Average precipitation days	2.1	2.3	2.9	3.7	9.4	15.2	16.5	17.2	15.8	7.7	2.6	2.3	97.7
Source: NOAA

== Demographics ==
Historical population
Census	Pop.	Note	%±
1990	3,126		—
2000	20,438		553.8%
2010	45,704		123.6%
2020	75,874		66.0%
U.S. Decennial Census

=== Racial and ethnic composition ===
Doral city, Florida – Racial composition Note: the US Census treats Hispanic/Latino as an ethnic category. This table excludes Latinos from the racial categories and assigns them to a separate category. Hispanics/Latinos may be of any race.
Race (NH = Non-Hispanic)	2020	2010	2000	1990
White alone (NH)	9.8% (7,446)	14.6% (6,659)	24% (4,912)	53.3% (1,666)
Black alone (NH)	1.1% (869)	1.6% (745)	2.1% (433)	1.4% (45)
American Indian alone (NH)	0.1% (41)	0% (17)	0% (5)	0.1% (4)
Asian alone (NH)	2.9% (2,180)	3.4% (1,566)	5% (1,015)	3.3% (102)
Pacific Islander alone (NH)	0% (8)	0% (3)	0% (0)	
Other race alone (NH)	0.7% (497)	0.3% (127)	0.2% (32)	0.1% (3)
Multiracial (NH)	2.5% (1,890)	0.5% (243)	1.3% (257)	—
Hispanic/Latino (any race)	83% (62,943)	79.5% (36,344)	67.4% (13,784)	41.8% (1,306)

=== 2020 census ===
As of the 2020 census, Doral had a population of 75,874. The median age was 36.5 years. 24.4% of residents were under the age of 18 and 8.3% of residents were 65 years of age or older. For every 100 females there were 91.5 males, and for every 100 females age 18 and over there were 88.2 males age 18 and over.

100.0% of residents lived in urban areas, while 0.0% lived in rural areas.

There were 24,981 households in Doral, of which 46.5% had children under the age of 18 living in them. Of all households, 57.9% were married-couple households, 14.0% were households with a male householder and no spouse or partner present, and 22.6% were households with a female householder and no spouse or partner present. About 14.5% of all households were made up of individuals and 2.7% had someone living alone who was 65 years of age or older. There were 15,311 families residing in the city.

There were 28,097 housing units, of which 11.1% were vacant. The homeowner vacancy rate was 2.2% and the rental vacancy rate was 9.4%.

Racial composition as of the 2020 census
Race	Number	Percent
White	19,827	26.1%
Black or African American	1,042	1.4%
American Indian and Alaska Native	181	0.2%
Asian	2,324	3.1%
Native Hawaiian and Other Pacific Islander	13	0.0%
Some other race	11,690	15.4%
Two or more races	40,797	53.8%
Hispanic or Latino (of any race)	62,943	83.0%

The most reported ancestries in 2020 were:

- Venezuelan (38.8%)
- Colombian (11.2%)
- Cuban (7.9%)
- Italian (5.5%)
- Puerto Rican (3.4%)
- Dominican (3.3%)
- Peruvian (2.2%)
- Ecuadorian (2.2%)
- Brazilian (1.9%)
- German (1.9%)

=== 2010 census ===
As of the 2010 United States census, there were 45,704 people, 13,462 households, and 10,583 families residing in the city.

=== 2000 census ===
As of 2000, 38.0% of residents had children under the age of 18 living with them, 57.0% were married couples living together, 9.5% had a female householder with no husband present, and 28.6% were non-families. 22.2% of all households were made up of individuals, and 1.7% had someone living alone who was 65 years of age or older. The average household size was 2.66 and the average family size was 3.12.

In 2000, 25.1% of the city population was under the age of 18, 7.7% from 18 to 24, 43.6% from 25 to 44, 18.7% from 45 to 64, and 4.8% who were 65 years of age or older. As of 2000, the median age was 33 years. For every 100 females, there were 97.8 males. For every 100 females age 18 and over, there were 96.0 males.

In 2000, the median income for a household in the CDP was $53,060, and the median income for a family was $57,193. Males had a median income of $46,324 versus $32,827 for females. The per capita income for the CDP was $27,705. About 9.5% of families and 11.7% of the population were below the poverty line, including 14.8% of those under age 18 and 10.6% of those age 65 or over.

In 2000, 16.2% of residents spoke only English at home, while 74.5% spoke Spanish, 5.0% spoke Portuguese 1.0% Chinese, 0.6% Tamil, 0.5% Japanese, and 0.5% Arabic.

== Economy ==
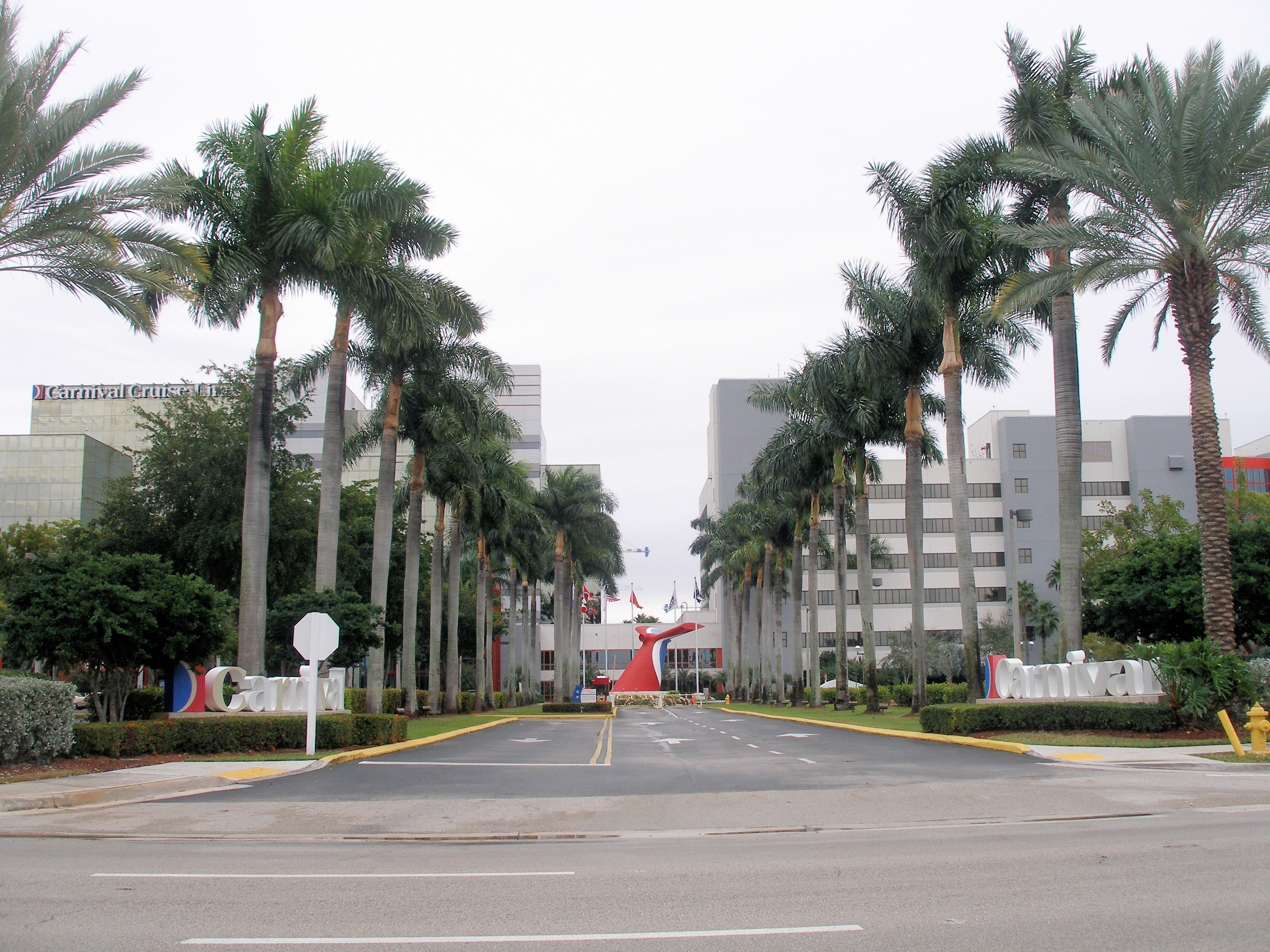
Carnival Corporation and Carnival Cruise Lines headquarters in Doral

In 2005, Doral had over 10,000 businesses. During that year, Carnival Cruise Lines, Ryder, and Univision had operations in Doral. For years leading into 2005, Doral attracted businesses of various sizes.

Carnival Corporation and subsidiary Carnival Cruise Lines have their headquarters in Doral. In addition, Amadeus North America, AAXICO, Benihana, and Perry Ellis International have their headquarters in Doral.

The Federal Reserve Bank of Atlanta Miami Branch Office, one of the five Federal Reserve Bank of Atlanta branch offices, is located in Doral. United States Southern Command is also based in Doral.

Dutch cargo airline Martinair operates its Americas headquarters in the Doral Corporate Center One in Doral. Avianca operates a Miami-area sales office in Doral. Grupo TACA operates a Miami-area TACA Center in Doral. El Al has its Miami-area office in Doral. Hellmann Worldwide Logistics has its US head office in Doral.

Before Doral was incorporated, the second Pan American World Airways (1996–1998) had its headquarters in Doral. At one time Ryder had its headquarters in Doral. In 2002 Ryder announced that it would move its headquarters to a new site in Miami-Dade County. The Miami Herald (along with El Nuevo Herald) moved its headquarters to Doral in 2013, and the headquarters stayed there until the newspaper vacated the facility in August 2020.

Portions of CSI: Miami episodes were filmed at CBS's Doral studios, which is home to its owned-and-operated affiliate, WFOR-TV, as well as MyNetworkTV affiliate WBFS-TV.

In September 2017, Doral published a comprehensive economic study which noted that "The City is home to 6,802 establishments employing 102,235 workers. The total volume of sales revenue from these companies, concentrated in such a small geographic area, represents $679,634 per worker, or over $1.35 million per resident making Doral one of South Florida's and the State's most productive local economies."

=== Principal employers ===
According to Doral's 2017 Comprehensive Annual Financial Report:

#	Employer	# of employees
1	Carnival Corporation	2,380
2	The Trump Organization	900
3	Univision	800
4	Leon Medical Centers	760
5	Supreme International	525
6	World Fuel Services	500
7	Amadeus	450
8	Perry Ellis International	420
9	Blue Cross and Blue Shield of Florida	412
10	Brinks Incorporated	366

== Government and infrastructure ==
The Doral Police Department was started on June 2, 2008, with 93 officers. Previously, the Miami-Dade Police Department served the area with stickers on the sides of its cars showing Doral's logo.

On January 20, 2015, former basketball star Shaquille O'Neal was sworn in as a reserve officer for Doral's police force.

=== List of mayors ===
Mayor	Term
Juan Carlos Bermudez	2003–2012
Luigi Boria	2012–2016
Juan Carlos Bermudez	2016–2022
Christi Fraga	2022–present

=== County government ===
The Miami-Dade Police Department's headquarters and Midwest District Station are in Doral. The Miami-Dade Fire Rescue Department's headquarters is in Doral. The Miami-Dade County Pet Adoption and Animal Protection Center (of Miami-Dade Animal Services) is in Doral.

=== State and federal representation ===
The Florida Department of Law Enforcement operates the Miami Regional Operations Center in an unincorporated area that was formerly a part of the Doral CDP and is outside Doral's city limits.

The National Transportation Safety Board operates the Miami Aviation Field Office in Doral.

== Transportation ==
The City of Doral Trolley was launched on February 1, 2008, and offers free travel for residents and visitors. The pilot program involved a weekday route that ran from 7:00 am to 7:00 pm with one trolley servicing one route. Currently the system has four routes, including a route servicing Florida International University, and the fleet includes 12 trolleys. In 2019, the City of Doral added the Freebee service, an on-demand transportation service which uses electric vehicles. Areas of service covered by the Freebee continues to expand with hot spot locations like Downtown Doral, CityPlace, Intercontinental Hotel and more being included.

== Education and institutions ==
=== Colleges and universities ===
- Carlos Albizu University
- Cesar Vallejo College
- Miami Dade College-West Campus
- Millennia Atlantic University
- Polytechnic University
- San Ignacio University
- West Coast University

=== Primary and secondary schools ===
==== Public schools ====
Doral is a part of the Miami-Dade County Public Schools system.

Residents are zoned to the following education facilities:

Public schools (MDCPS)

- Eugenia B. Thomas K–8 Center
- Ronald W. Reagan/Doral Senior High School
- Dr. Rolando Espinosa K–8 Center
- John I. Smith K–8 Center
- Toni Bilbao Preparatory Academy
- J.C. Bermudez Doral Senior High School
- Andrea Castillo Preparatory Academy

Charter schools

- Doral Academy Charter High School
- Doral Academy Charter Middle School
- Doral Academy of Technology
- Downtown Doral Charter Elementary School
- Downtown Doral Charter Upper School
- Just Arts and Management Charter Middle School
- Renaissance Elementary and Middle Charter School
- BridgePrep Academy
- Academir Charter School East
- Doral International Academy of Math & Science

==== Private schools ====
- Divine Savior Academy
- Joy of Learning Child Care Center
- Kids Corner
- Shelton Academy

==== Weekend schools ====
The Miami Hoshuko, a weekend school for Japanese people, has its school office in Doral. Classes are held in Westchester.

=== Public libraries ===
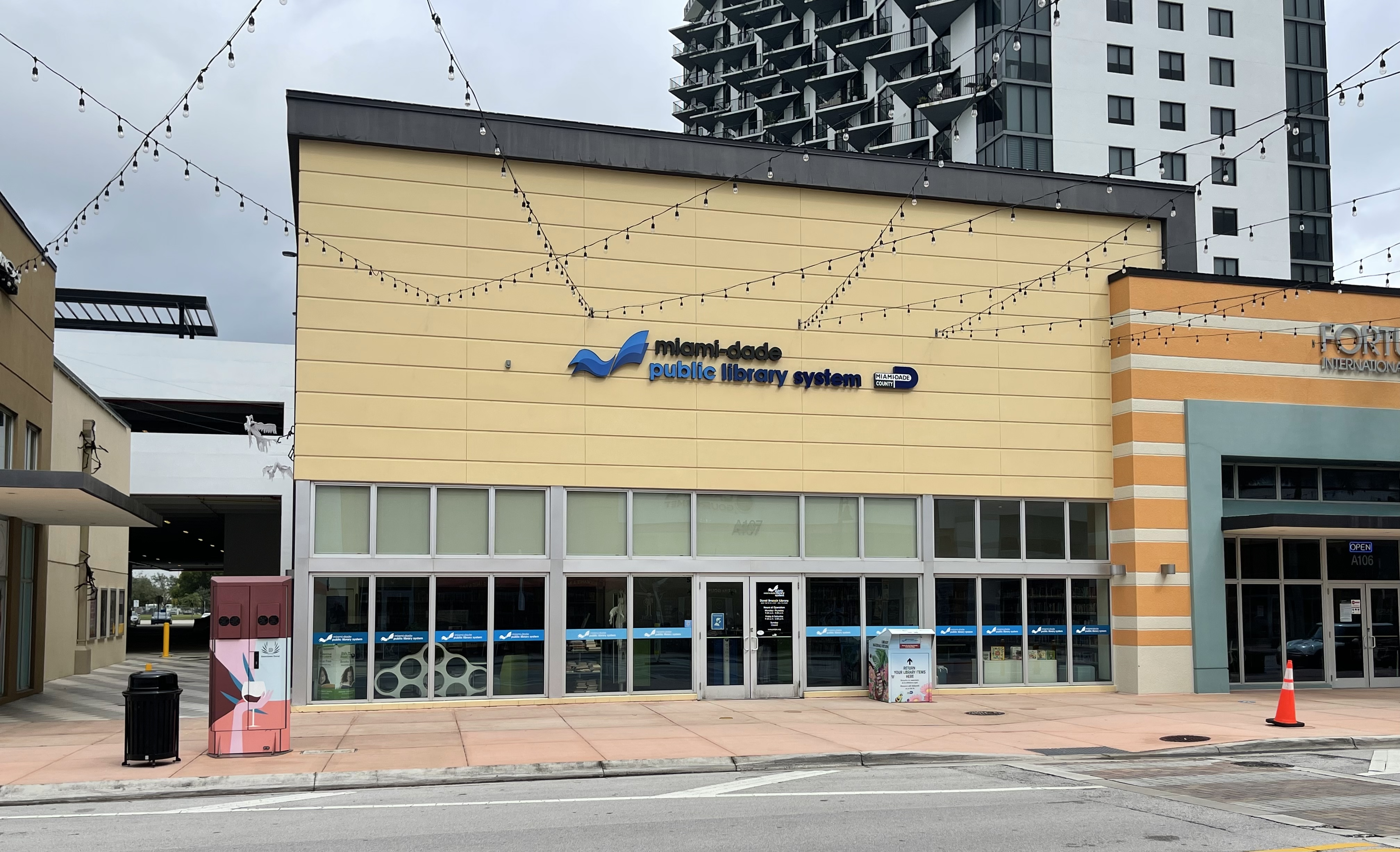
Miami-Dade Public Library System Doral Branch

The Miami-Dade Public Library System operates the Doral Branch, which reopened on July 5, 2003, after an expansion, in the Doral Isles Shopping Center. In addition the system operates the 7,500-square-foot (700 m^{2}) International Mall Branch in Doral. The library was the second to be built after the opening of the Main Library in 1985. In June 2019, the Miami-Dade Public Library System's Doral Branch was moved to Downtown Doral, the city's new dynamic urban core.

=== Parks and recreation ===
- Doral Central Park
- Doral Cultural Arts Center
- Doral Glades Park
- Doral Legacy Park
- Doral Meadow Park
- Downtown Doral Park
- MAU Park
- Morgan Levy Park
- Trails & Tails Park
- Veterans Park
- White Course Park
