= Milam =

Milam, can refer to:

- Dream yoga, (T:rmi-lam; S:svapnadarśana).

== People ==
- Benjamin Milam, Texas Revolution figure
- Blaine Milam, American murderer executed in Texas
- Carl H. Milam, American librarian
- J. B. Milam, chief of the Cherokee Nation
- Lorenzo Milam, American writer and activist
- Marcus A. Milam, businessman from Florida
- William Milam, American diplomat

== Places ==
- Milam, Texas
- Milam County, Texas
- Milam, Hardy County, West Virginia
- Milam, Wyoming County, West Virginia
- Milam Glacier, Kumaon Division, Uttarakhand, India
- Milam, India, a village in India
- Milam Branch, a river in Tennessee

== Schools ==
- M.A. Milam K-8 Center in Hialeah, Florida
- Milam Street Trade School in Shreveport, Louisiana
