= MAST @ FIU Biscayne Bay Campus =

Coordinates: 25.9070°N 80.1425°W

MAST@FIU Biscayne Bay Campus

Location
- 14301 Bay Vista Boulevard; North Miami, Florida 33181; United States

Information
- Type: Public Magnet
- Motto: Be Worlds Ahead!
- Established: August 2013
- School district: Miami-Dade County Public Schools
- Principal: Robert Sarmiento (2023-present)
- Staff: 16.00 (FTE)
- Grades: 9-12
- Enrollment: 369 (2018–19)
- Student to teacher ratio: 23.06
- Colors: Blue and Gold
- Mascot: Manta Ray
- Newspaper: The Marine Echoes
- School Hours: 7:20 AM to 2:20 PM
- Website: MAST @ FIU website

MAST@FIU Biscanye Bay Campus, also known as MAST@FIU, and MAST@ FIU BBC, is a public magnet secondary school. The school is located in North Miami, Florida, on Florida International University (FIU)'s Biscayne Bay Campus. It is the fourth MAST school to open, after MAST Academy (in Virginia Key), MAST Medical (in Homestead), and José Martí MAST (in Hialeah).

In 2013, it was reported that opening the school would depend on funding from the community. On August 19, 2013, MAST@FIU opened.

The school takes advantage of its location on the bay, similar to the Virginia Key MAST Academy. MAST@FIU offers the studies of a public magnet, while shifting the setting to a university atmosphere for dual enrollment classes at FIU.
