= Young Women's Preparatory Academy =

Location
- 1150 SW 1 ST; Miami, FL 33130
- Coordinates: 25°46′21.36″N 80°12′49.85″W

Information
- Type: Public school, all-girls
- Established: 2007
- Teaching staff: 23.00 (FTE)
- Grades: 6 to 12
- Enrollment: 399 (2018–19)
- Student to teacher ratio: 17.35
- Colors: Azure blue and white
- Mascot: Monarch butterfly
- Principal: Concepcion I. Martinez
- Website: ywpa.dadeschools.net

Young Women's Preparatory Academy (YWPA) is a grade 6-12 magnet school for girls, located in the Little Havana neighborhood of Miami, Florida, United States. It is a part of Miami-Dade County Public Schools (MDCPS).

YWPA was the first public school established in South Florida that was only for girls.

The school was established in 2006, with a focus on mathematics, science, and technology. It had about 400 students as of 2012, and as of 2014 had about the same number.

As of 2015 Concepción I. Martinez is the principal.

== Programs ==
Young Women's Preparatory Academy is not a selective public secondary school in Miami, Fl, and enrollment is a constant issue for this school.

== Academic achievements ==
Circa 2012, U.S. News & World Report ranked YWPA #26 in the United States and #2 in Florida. As of that year, 300 girls were on the school's waiting list.

In 2013, YWPA won a Magnet Schools of Excellence Award from the Magnet Schools of America.
