= Air Base K–8 Center =

Coordinates: 25.476231°N 80.465652°W

Air Base K-8 Center For International Education
- Miami-Dade County, FL; United States

Information
- Type: Public
- Motto: Soaring on the Wings of Cultural Discovery
- Established: 1958
- NCES District ID: 1200390
- NCES School ID: 120039000367
- Principal: Alonza Pendergrass
- Mascot: Falcon
- Website: airbasek8.net

Air Base K–8 Center, The Center for International Education, (formerly Air Base Elementary School) is a K-8 school located at 12225 SW 280th Street in unincorporated Miami-Dade County, Florida, United States, northeast of Homestead. Its principal is Alonza Pendergrass and it is part of the Miami-Dade County Public Schools System. The school's mascot is the Falcon, and its colors are black, teal, and white. Its total enrollment for the 2005-2006 school year was 451 students in kindergarten through fifth grade. The school has been recognized as a National Magnet School of Merit.

The school opened in 1958. The following year, on September 7, 1959, Air Base Elementary and Orchard Villa Elementary became the first two desegregated schools in the system.

The school originally was built to serve children of families at Homestead Air Force Base. After Hurricane Andrew damaged the air base in 1992, many Air Force personnel were relocated and student population dropped. To maintain enrollment, in the 1996-97 school year the school was converted to a magnet school offering an international program. Extensive foreign language instruction is offered, including English for Speakers of Other Languages (ESOL), Spanish for Spanish speakers, and Spanish and French as second languages. It offers a fee-based pre-Kindergarten program and has special before and after school care programs.

== Awards and recognition ==
The school has been recognized with the Magnet Schools of America Award every year from 1998 through 2007. The school has also participated in events such as STEAM BOWL 2016-2017, where they placed 2nd, thanks to Juan Roldan, Robert Lageyre, James Morice, Bryant Marrero, Anshika Motiani, and Ann Prakash. The school has been rated as an "A" school for five consecutive years.

== School uniforms ==
The school requires its students to wear school uniforms. Elementary students wear teal, black, and white while middle school students wear royal blue and grey.
