= Marcus A. Milam =

M.A. Milam
- Born: Marcus Alexander Milam; March 8, 1876; Paris, Tennessee, U.S.
- Died: May 6, 1940 (aged 64); Miami, Florida, U.S.
- Occupation(s): President of Milam Dairy Farm, Inc.
- Years active: 1909 – 1940
- Spouse: Omega W. Milam (m. 1907–1940; his death)
- Children: 4

Marcus Alexander Milam Sr. (March 8, 1876 – May 6, 1940) was a Miami-based pioneer and businessman, who established a successful Florida dairy farm.

== Early life ==
Milam was born on March 8, 1876, in Paris, Tennessee, before immigrating to Florida in 1881, at the age of five.

Milam married Omega Wigginton on September 18, 1907.

== Career ==
He opened his first dairy farm in Northwest Miami-Dade County in 1909, before organizing the Milam Dairy Farm in 1920. Milam found success as a dairy tycoon and pioneer during the early 20th-century Florida land boom. In 1929, it was documented that Milam's dairy ventures led several Dade county youth to successful livelihood paths.

Aside from his dairy business ventures, Milam was a junior partner of Railey-Milam Hardware Co., and had collaborated with Gaston Drake to organize the Drake Lumber Company.

== Death and legacy ==
Milam died of a heart attack, on May 6, 1940. His spouse, Omega W. Milam, died on April 21, 1946.

The Dressel Brothers purchased the Milam Dairy in 1941, renaming it Dressel's Dairy.

Milam would become the namesake of Florida State Road 969, which is locally known as Milam Dairy Road. Additionally, in 1961, an elementary school in Hialeah was built on his grounds that were used as pasture land, and named after him. The school expanded to become a K-8 institution in 1998.
