= David Menasche =

David Menasche (August 1, 1973 – November 20, 2014) was an American educator and a cofounding teacher of Coral Reef Senior High School in South Miami-Dade, Florida.

Menasche began his teaching career at Coral Reef after earning his teaching certificate at Florida International University in 1997. In the fall of 2006, he was diagnosed with glioblastoma multiforme, a lemon-size brain tumor in his right temporal lobe indicative of Stage IV brain cancer, and given a few months to live. After undergoing three surgeries, two and a half years of chemotherapy, and 30 rounds of radiation, he was able to teach at Coral Reef for six more years until he suffered a seizure in 2012 that greatly reduced his peripheral vision in both eyes and weakened his left side, forcing him to give up teaching.

Unable to return to Coral Reef, Menasche decided to embark on a quest to reconnect with some of the 3,000 students he had taught during his 15-year career. Calling it The Vision Quest, Menasche posted his plans to his old friends and students on Facebook with a call for couches, and ended up with 73 offers within three days.

Menasche departed from Miami on November 2, 2012, with a list of 150 available couches across the country, filming and chronicling his journey along the way. Completing his trek in February 2013, he spent a total of 101 days on the road, visiting 31 cities, and seeing over 75 former students.

Following his trip, he published an autobiography, The Priority List: A Teacher’s Final Quest to Discover Life’s Greatest Lessons. The title of the memoir comes from an exercise Menasche used with his high school students when studying Othello. It is a list of values that he asked students to prioritize for the play’s main characters in order to develop an understanding of motivation.

Menasche had two older brothers, Maurice and Jacques. He separated from his wife, Paula, after the Vision Quest. Menasche’s story gained national attention when Lidia Dinkova, a former student, contacted him to write a story for the Miami Herald. NBC, USA Today, and CNN then quickly picked up the story of Menasche’s Vision Quest and struggle with brain cancer. Menasche died on November 20, 2014, aged 41.
