= List of 2020 cyberattacks on U.S. schools =

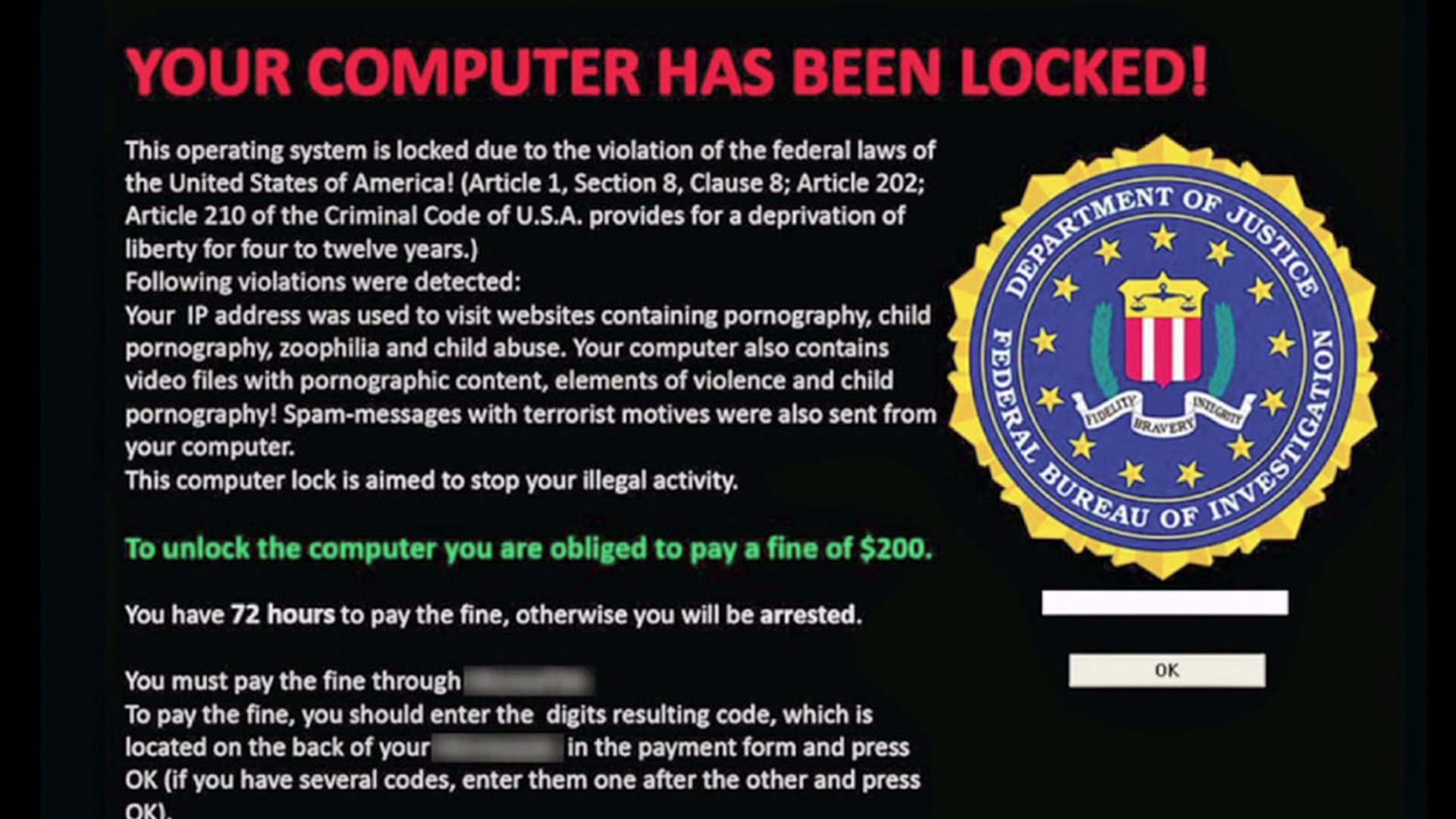
Ransomware, an example of a locked computer screen

List of cyberattacks on schools From 2016 to 2019 there have been 855 cyberattacks on US school districts. Microsoft Security Intelligence has said there are more attacks on schools and school districts than any other industry. There were 348 reported cyberattacks on school districts in 2019. School districts were allocating millions of dollars for their computer systems to support virtual learning in the wake of the COVID-19 pandemic. The Miami Dade Public Schools invested in a $15.3 million online learning system. In 2020 their system was hacked with a Denial of Service Cyber attack.

The two main types of cyberattacks on schools are distributed denial of service (Ddos) - an attack which overwhelms the target's internet bandwidth, and ransomware - where the hacker takes control of the target's computer system and demands money. In 2020, because of reliance on distance learning, schools braced for cyberattacks. The average cost for organizations that do not pay the ransomware demands was $730,000.

== Legislation ==
US Representative Josh Harder introduced a bill in congress entitled: Protecting Students from Cybercrimes Act. The bill's goal is to give schools $25 million in grants to implement cyber security. In 2019 US Senators Gary Peters and Rick Scott also authored a bill to safeguard school computer systems, The K-12 Cybersecurity Act.

== Affected schools ==
- Allegheny County Schools (NC) ransomware attack
- Athens Independent School District (Texas) ransomware attack
- Burke County Public Schools (NC) ransomeware attack
- Baugo Community Schools (Indiana) cyberattack
- Conejo Valley Unified school district (California) DDoS
- Cherry Hill School District Philadelphia malware attack
- Gadsden Independent School District (Sunland Park NM) ransomware attack
- Hartford Public Schools ransomware attack
- Hamden school district (Connecticut) malware attack
- Haywood County Schools ransomeware attack
- Humble Independent School District (Texas) DDoS attack
- Huntington Beach Unified High School District (California) ransomeware attack
- Jackson Public School District (Mississippi) malware attack
- Jay Public School District (Oklahoma) virus
- King George County Schools ransomware attack
- Lumberton Township Public Schools in Burlington County (New Jersey) Zoom malicious pornographic intrusion
- Madison Public Schools (Connecticut) Zoombombing attack
- Miami-Dade Public Schools System cyberattack
- Mitchell County Schools (North Carolina) ransomware attack
- The Mountain View-Los Altos High School District (California) ransomware attack
- Community School Corporation of New Palestine Indiana (DDoS) cyberattack
- Penncrest School District (Pennsylvania) ransomware attack (paid $10,000)
- Pittsburg Unified School District of Pennsylvania ransomeware attack
- Ponca City Public Schools (Oklahoma) ransomware attack
- Richmond school district (Michigan) ransomware attack
- Surry County Schools ransomeware attack
- South Adams Schools (Indiana) ransomware attack
- Southern Hancock School District (Indiana) DDoS attack
- St. Landry Parish schools (Louisiana) malware attack
- Toledo Public School district (Ohio) cyberattack
- Ventura Unified school district (California) DDoS

=== Colleges ===
- Capital University Law School in (Columbus, Ohio)
- Columbia College Chicago ransomware attack
- Michigan State University ransomware attack
- New Mexico State University and the school's foundation virus
- Regis University (Denver Colorado) ransomware attack paid ransom.
- University of California at San Francisco School of Medicine ransomware attack paid 1.14 million
- University of New Mexico School of Law (Albuquerque, New Mexico)
- Wallace State Community College (Alabama) virus

== See also ==
- Application layer DDoS attack
- Fork bomb
- Hit-and-run DDoS
- List of computer criminals
- List of cyberattacks
- List of hacker groups
- Hacks at the Massachusetts Institute of Technology
- XML denial-of-service attack
- Xor DDoS
- Zombie (computing)
