= Coral Reef Senior High School =

Location
- 10101 SW 152nd Street; Miami, Florida 33157; United States; 25°37′48″N 80°21′23″W

Information
- Type: Public magnet
- Established: August 1997
- School district: Miami-Dade County Public Schools
- Principal: Nicole Bergé-MacInnes
- Teaching staff: 126.00 (FTE)
- Grades: 9–12
- Enrollment: 3,296 (2023–2024)
- Student to teacher ratio: 26.16
- Campus size: 2,742 sq.ft
- Campus type: Suburban
- Colors: Teal, black, grey, and white
- Mascot: Barry the Barracuda
- Nickname: Barracudas
- Newspaper: Baitline
- Website: Coral Reef Senior High School homepage

Coral Reef Senior High School is a secondary school located at 10101 S.W. 152nd Street in Richmond Heights, Florida, United States. The principal is Nicole Bergé-MacInnes. Coral Reef is locally known as "Miami's Mega Magnet School" since it offers six different magnet programs.

According to Newsweek's list of the 1,000 Top U.S. Schools in 2008, the school was ranked 19th in the nation, making it 4th in the state of Florida at the time. In 2007, 2006 and 2005, it ranked 22nd, 29th and 13th, respectively. This ranking is based on a ratio devised by Jay Mathews, which takes the number of Advanced Placement or International Baccalaureate tests taken by all students at a school in that school year and divides it by the number of graduating seniors. Coral Reef was ranked #134 of all high schools in the nation in 2010.

== History ==
The school does not primarily serve the surrounding neighborhoods, but instead takes applications from middle school students all over the county. Selection is done via a lottery system for all magnet programs except for Visual & Performing Arts, for which acceptance is based on ability; students must audition for this program. Most students living around the Coral Reef area attend Miami Palmetto Senior High School or Miami Killian Senior High School.

Coral Reef has received an "A" grade for its performance on the FCAT examination on ten occasions since the annual test was first administered in 1998.

Coral Reef has three publications: the newspaper, Baitline; the yearbook, Tsunami; and the literary magazine, Elysium. The newspaper is published monthly while, the yearbook and literary magazine are published annually. The daily morning newscast, CRTV Live (originally known as Cudavision, and later adapted to include the channel number as Cudavision 21), airs on closed-circuit channel 21.

Coral Reef has six magnets: International Baccalaureate, Health Sciences, Business & Finance, Legal & Public Affairs, Agriscience & Engineering Technology, and Visual & Performing Arts.

== Athletics ==
In the 2019-2020 marching season, the Barracuda Marching Band won straight superiors at the Marching Band Music Performance Assessment with their show "Storms of Africa" by Gary P. Gilroy and Shawn Glyde.

In the 2021-2022 school year, the Barracuda Band won the Otto J. Kraushaar Award for achieving straight superiors at the Marching Band Music Performance Assessment with their show "Pirates!" by Gary P. Gilroy and Shawn Glyde, straight superiors at the District Concert Band Music Performance Assessment, and straight superiors at the State Concert Band Music Performance Assessment.

== Demographics ==
Coral Reef is 49% Hispanic (of any race), 31% White non-Hispanic, 25% Black, 5% Asian, and 5% other races.

== Notable people ==
=== Alumni ===
- Jessica Darrow, actress/singer, Disney’s Encanto
- JD Natasha, singer

=== Faculty ===
- David Menasche, author

== See also ==
- Miami-Dade County Public Schools
- Education in the United States
