= Hialeah, Florida =

City in Florida, United States

- City
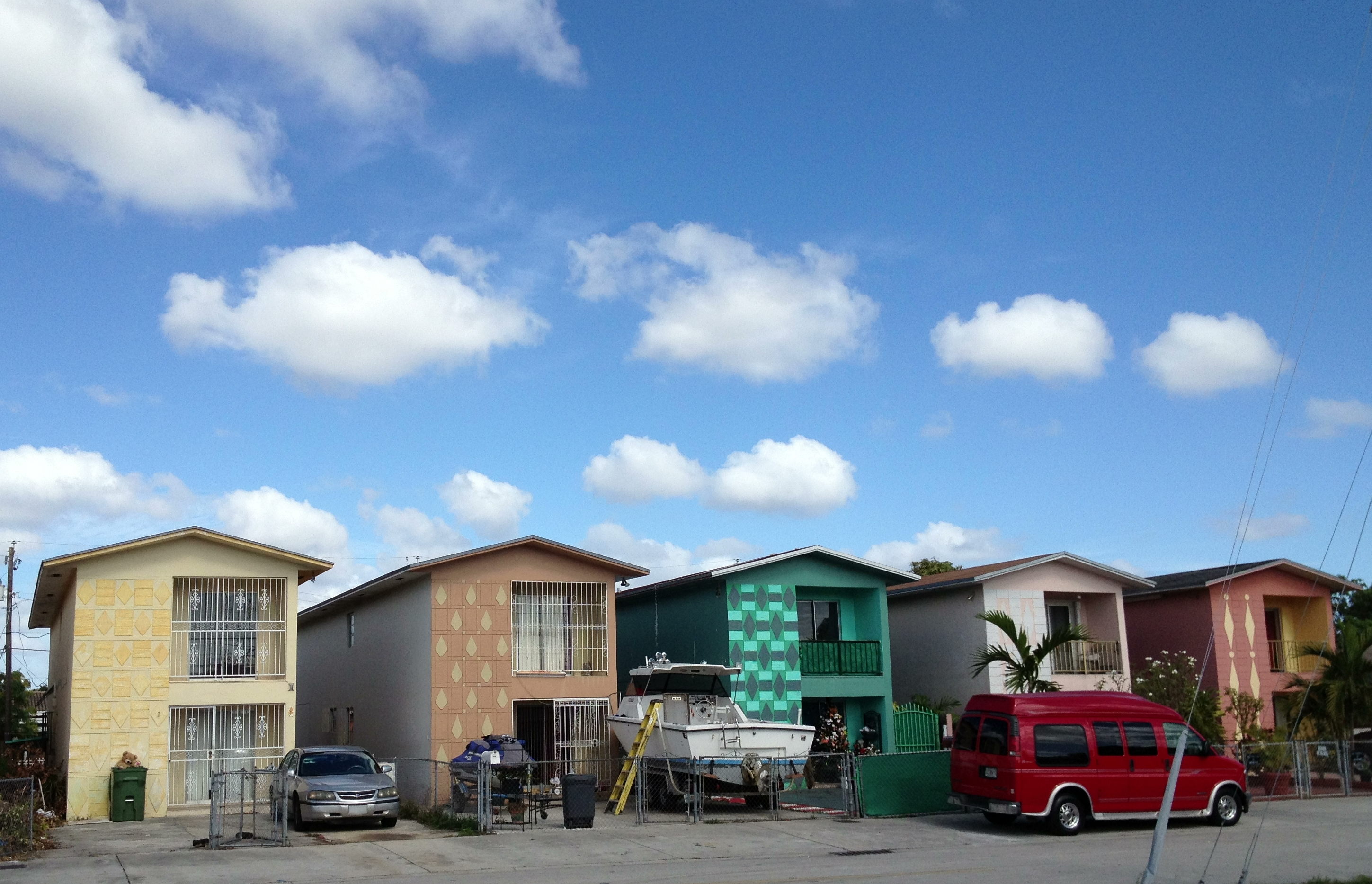
- Houses in Hialeah

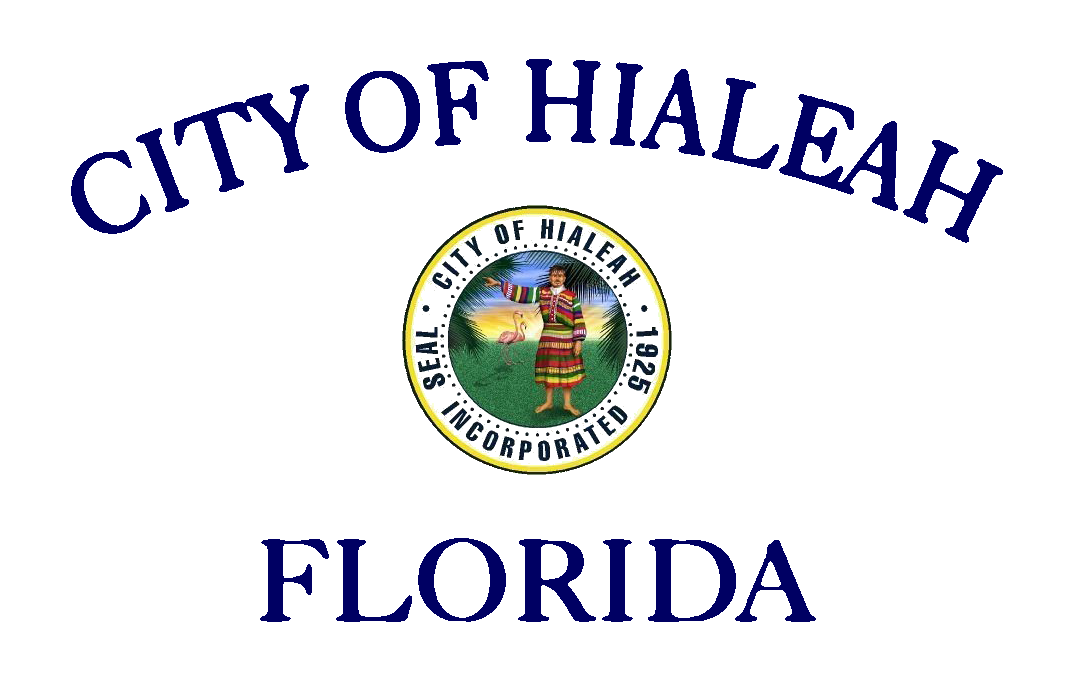
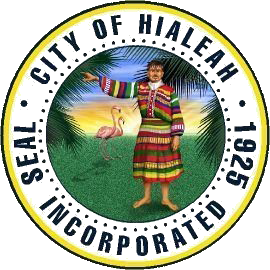
- Flag Seal
- Nickname: "The City of Progress"
- Location in Miami-Dade County and the state of Florida

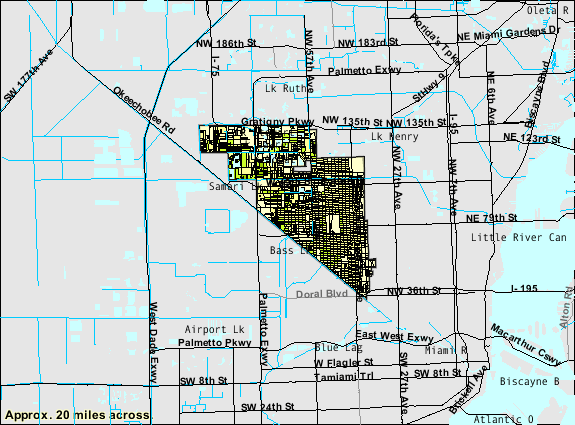
- U.S. Census Bureau map showing city limits prior to most recent annexation
- Coordinates: 25°52′38″N 80°18′50″W
- Country: United States
- State: Florida
- County: Miami-Dade
- Incorporated: September 10, 1925

Government
  - Type: Mayor-Council
  - Mayor: Bryan Calvo

Area
  - City: 22.81 sq mi (59.09 km^{2})
  - Land: 21.58 sq mi (55.90 km^{2})
  - Water: 1.24 sq mi (3.20 km^{2})
- Elevation: 0 ft (0 m)

Population (2020)
  - City: 223,109
  - Estimate (2023): 221,300
  - Density: 10,338.0/sq mi (3,991.52/km^{2})
  - Metro: 6,166,488
- Time zone: UTC-5 (EST)
  - Summer (DST): UTC-4 (EDT)
- ZIP codes: 33002, 33010-33018
- Area codes: 305, 786, 645
- FIPS code: 12-30000
- GNIS feature ID: 2404689
- Website: hialeahfl.gov

Hialeah (/ˌhaɪəˈliːə/ HY-ə-LEE-ə; Latin American Spanish: [xaʝaˈli.a]) is a city in Miami-Dade County, Florida, United States. With a population of 223,109 as of the 2020 census, it is the sixth-largest city in Florida. It is the second largest city by population in Miami-Dade County, in the Miami metropolitan area of South Florida, which was home to an estimated 6,198,782 people at the 2018 census. It is located west-northwest of Miami, and is one of a few places in the county—others being Homestead, Miami Beach, Surfside, Bal Harbour, Sunny Isles Beach, and Golden Beach—to have its own street grid numbered separately from the rest of the county (which is otherwise based on Miami Avenue at Flagler Street in Downtown Miami, the county seat). Hialeah was incorporated in 1925.

The city is notable for its high Hispanic proportion, which was 94% in 2020; this was the second-highest proportion of Hispanic Americans in the contiguous United States, and the highest proportion among incorporated communities outside of Puerto Rico. Hialeah also has the highest proportion of Cuban and Cuban-American residents of any city in the United States, at 84.1% of the population, making them a prominent feature of the city's culture. In 2023, 89.5% of residents reported speaking Spanish at home, and the language is an important part of daily life in the city.

Hialeah is served by the Miami Metrorail at the Okeechobee, Hialeah, and Tri-Rail/Metrorail Transfer stations. The Okeechobee and Hialeah stations serve primarily as park-and-ride commuter stations for commuters and residents going into Downtown Miami, and the Tri-Rail station for Miami International Airport and north to West Palm Beach.

== History ==
The city's name is most commonly attributed to Muskogee origin, "Haiyakpo" (prairie) and "hili" (pretty) combining in "Hialeah" to mean "pretty prairie". Alternatively, the word is of Seminole origin meaning "Upland Prairie". The city is located upon a large prairie between Biscayne Bay and the Everglades.

This "high prairie" caught the eye of pioneer aviator Glenn Curtiss and Missouri cattleman James H. Bright in 1921. Together, they developed not only the town of Hialeah but also Hialeah Park Race Track. In 1921, the first plat was drawn up, and the town was named.

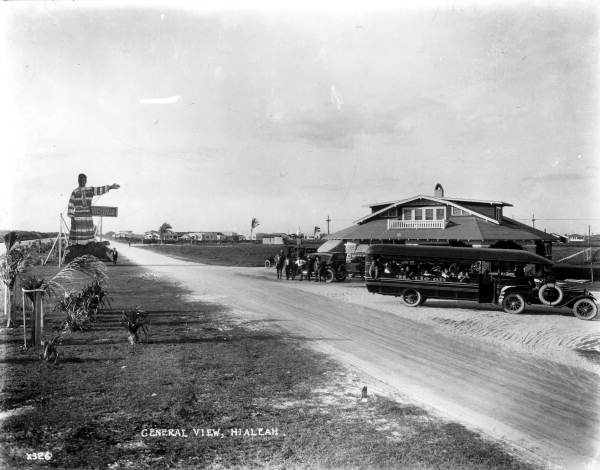
Downtown Hialeah in 1921

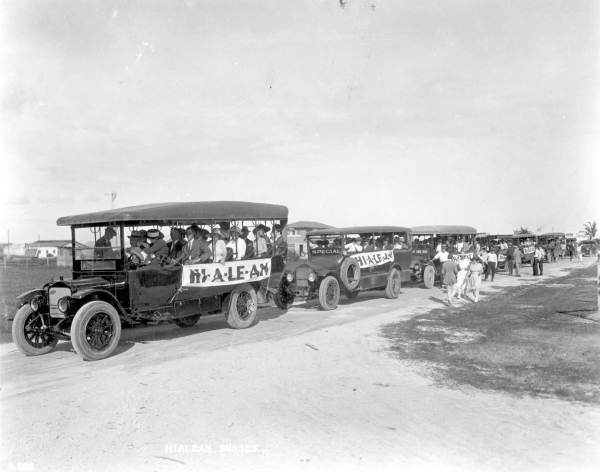
Group of tour buses sponsored by real estate developers in Hialeah in 1921

In the early "Roaring '20s", Hialeah produced significant entertainment contributions. Sporting included the Spanish sport of jai alai and greyhound racing, and media included silent movies like D.W. Griffith's The White Rose which was made at the Miami Movie Studios located in Hialeah. However, the 1926 Miami hurricane brought many of these activities to an end.

In the years since its incorporation in 1925, many historical events and people have been associated with Hialeah. The local Miccosukee leader Jack Tigertail is in the official seal of the City of Hialeah. The opening of the horse racing course at Hialeah Park Race Track in 1925 (which was nicknamed the "Grand Dame") received more coverage in the Miami media than any other sporting event in the history of Dade County up to that time and since then there have been countless horse racing histories played out at the world-famous 220-acre (0.89 km^{2}) park. It was considered one of the most grand thoroughbred horse racing parks with its majestic Mediterranean style architecture and was considered the Jewel of Hialeah at the time.

The park's grandeur has attracted millions, included among them are names known around the world such as the Kennedy family, Harry Truman, General Omar Bradley, Winston Churchill, and J.P. Morgan. The Hialeah Park Race Track also holds the dual distinction of being an Audubon Bird Sanctuary due to its famous pink flamingos and being listed on the National Register of Historic Places. The famous aviator Amelia Earhart in 1937 said her final good-byes to the continental U.S. from Hialeah as she left on her ill-fated flight around the world in 1937.

While Hialeah was once envisioned as a playground for the elite, Cuban exiles fleeing Fidel Castro's 1959 revolution, as well as World War II veterans and city planners, transformed the city into a working-class community. Hialeah historian Patricia Fernández-Kelly explained, "It became an affordable Eden." She further describes the city as "a place where different groups have left their imprint while trying to create a sample of what life should be like." Several waves of Cuban exiles, starting after the Cuban Revolution in 1959 and continuing through to the Freedom Flights from 1965 to 1973, the Mariel boatlift in 1980, and the Balseros or boat people of the late 1990s, created what at least one expert has considered the most economically successful immigrant enclave in U.S. history as Hialeah is the only American industrial city that continues to grow.

From a population of 1,500 in 1925, Hialeah has grown faster than most of the 10 larger cities in the state of Florida since the 1960s and holds the rank of Florida's sixth-largest city, with more than 224,000 residents. The city is also one of the largest employers in Dade County.

In January 2009, Forbes magazine listed Hialeah as one of the most "boring" cities in the United States; Forbes defined this by low media presence in the city.

== Geography ==
According to the United States Census Bureau, the city has a total area of 19.7 square miles (51 km^{2}). 19.2 square miles (50 km^{2}) of it is land and 0.5 square miles (1.3 km^{2}) of it (2.53%) is water.

=== Climate ===
According to the Köppen climate classification, Hialeah has a tropical monsoon climate (Am).

Climate data for Hialeah, Florida, 1991–2020 normals, extremes 1940–present
Month	Jan	Feb	Mar	Apr	May	Jun	Jul	Aug	Sep	Oct	Nov	Dec	Year
Record high °F (°C)	89 (32)	96 (36)	98 (37)	96 (36)	99 (37)	99 (37)	100 (38)	99 (37)	97 (36)	97 (36)	92 (33)	90 (32)	100 (38)
Mean maximum °F (°C)	84.2 (29.0)	86.4 (30.2)	88.7 (31.5)	90.7 (32.6)	92.9 (33.8)	93.7 (34.3)	94.9 (34.9)	94.3 (34.6)	93.0 (33.9)	91.5 (33.1)	87.4 (30.8)	85.5 (29.7)	96.2 (35.7)
Mean daily maximum °F (°C)	75.7 (24.3)	77.7 (25.4)	79.8 (26.6)	83.2 (28.4)	86.1 (30.1)	88.4 (31.3)	89.9 (32.2)	90.1 (32.3)	88.5 (31.4)	85.6 (29.8)	80.9 (27.2)	77.6 (25.3)	83.6 (28.7)
Daily mean °F (°C)	67.4 (19.7)	69.8 (21.0)	72.1 (22.3)	75.9 (24.4)	79.1 (26.2)	82.0 (27.8)	83.3 (28.5)	83.5 (28.6)	82.1 (27.8)	79.2 (26.2)	73.9 (23.3)	70.2 (21.2)	76.6 (24.8)
Mean daily minimum °F (°C)	59.1 (15.1)	61.9 (16.6)	64.5 (18.1)	68.5 (20.3)	72.2 (22.3)	75.5 (24.2)	76.7 (24.8)	76.9 (24.9)	75.8 (24.3)	72.8 (22.7)	66.8 (19.3)	62.9 (17.2)	69.5 (20.8)
Mean minimum °F (°C)	44.8 (7.1)	48.0 (8.9)	52.0 (11.1)	58.9 (14.9)	65.4 (18.6)	70.3 (21.3)	71.2 (21.8)	71.5 (21.9)	71.4 (21.9)	63.9 (17.7)	55.3 (12.9)	48.7 (9.3)	41.9 (5.5)
Record low °F (°C)	28 (−2)	30 (−1)	32 (0)	38 (3)	44 (7)	52 (11)	62 (17)	57 (14)	55 (13)	45 (7)	37 (3)	29 (−2)	28 (−2)
Average precipitation inches (mm)	2.03 (52)	2.29 (58)	2.81 (71)	3.81 (97)	6.08 (154)	11.45 (291)	7.92 (201)	9.98 (253)	11.53 (293)	8.23 (209)	4.00 (102)	2.80 (71)	72.93 (1,852)
Average precipitation days (≥ 0.01 in)	7.5	6.5	6.5	7.2	10.4	17.6	17.6	18.5	18.7	14.2	8.5	7.9	141.1
Source: NOAA

=== Surrounding areas ===
Miami Lakes, Opa-locka
Unincorporated Miami-Dade County Westview
Hialeah Gardens, Medley, Miami Springs Westview, West Little River, Gladeview, Brownsville
Miami Springs Miami
Hialeah Gardens, Medley, Miami Springs

== Demographics ==
Historical population
Census	Pop.	Note	%±
1930	2,600		—
1940	3,958		52.2%
1950	19,676		397.1%
1960	66,972		240.4%
1970	102,452		53.0%
1980	145,254		41.8%
1990	188,004		29.4%
2000	226,419		20.4%
2010	224,669		−0.8%
2020	223,109		−0.7%
2022 (est.)	220,292	▼	−1.3%
U.S. Decennial Census

Historical demographics	2020	2010	2000	1990	1980
White (non-Hispanic)	4.3%	4.2%	8.1%	10.9%	23.9%
Hispanic or Latino	94.0%	94.7%	90.3%	87.6%	74.3%
Black or African American (non-Hispanic)	0.6%	0.5%	0.9%	0.9%	1.1%
Asian and Pacific Islander (non-Hispanic)	0.4%	0.3%	0.4%	0.4%	0.7%
Native American (non-Hispanic)	< 0.1%	< 0.1%	< 0.1%	< 0.1%	0.7%
Some other race (non-Hispanic)	0.2%	0.1%	< 0.1%	0.1%	0.7%
Two or more races (non-Hispanic)	0.3%	0.1%	0.2%	N/A	N/A
Population	223,109	224,669	226,419	188,004	145,254

=== Racial and ethnic composition ===
Hialeah, Florida – Racial and ethnic composition Note: the US Census treats Hispanic/Latino as an ethnic category. This table excludes Latinos from the racial categories and assigns them to a separate category. Hispanics/Latinos may be of any race.
Race / Ethnicity (NH = Non-Hispanic)	Pop 2000	Pop 2010	Pop 2020	% 2000	% 2010	% 2020
White alone (NH)	18,267	9,511	9,684	8.07%	4.23%	4.34%
Black or African American alone (NH)	2,127	1,209	1,380	0.94%	0.54%	0.62%
Native American or Alaska Native alone (NH)	92	73	68	0.04%	0.03%	0.03%
Asian alone (NH)	814	697	877	0.36%	0.31%	0.39%
Native Hawaiian or Pacific Islander alone (NH)	14	2	12	0.01%	0.00%	0.01%
Other race alone (NH)	68	119	534	0.03%	0.05%	0.24%
Mixed race or Multiracial (NH)	494	253	770	0.22%	0.11%	0.35%
Hispanic or Latino (any race)	204,543	212,805	209,784	90.34%	94.72%	94.03%
Total	85,781	93,853	223,109	100.00%	100.00%	100.00%

=== 2020 census ===
As of the 2020 United States census, there were 223,109 people, 76,459 households, and 56,047 families residing in the city.

=== 2010 census ===
In 2015 through 2016, the population in Hialeah grew from 234,714 to 235,626, a 0.4% increase. The median household income grew from $29,249 to $29,817, a 1.9% increase.

As of the 2010 United States census, there were 224,669 people, 73,826 households, and 56,896 families residing in the city.

In 2010, Hialeah was the tenth-largest city in the United States among cities with a population density of more than 10,000 inhabitants per square mile (3,900 inhabitants per square kilometer).

=== Census data ===
As of 2000, 36.2% had children under the age of 18 living with them, 57.4% were married couples living together, 17.4% had a female householder with no husband present, and 18.7% were non-families. 14.7% of all households were made up of individuals, and 7.8% had someone living alone who was 65 years of age or older. The average household size was 3.15 and the average family size was 3.39.

In 2000, the age distribution of the population showed 23.0% under the age of 18, 8.2% from 18 to 24, 29.4% from 25 to 44, 22.9% from 45 to 64, and 16.6% who were 65 years of age or older. The median age was 43.5 years. For every 100 females, there were 92.7 males. For every 100 females age 18 and over, there were 89.6 males.

In 2000, the median income for a household in the city was $29,492, and the median income for a family was $31,621. Males had a median income of $23,133 versus $17,886 for females. The per capita income for the city was $12,402. About 16.0% of families and 18.6% of the population were below the poverty line, including 22.2% of those under age 18 and 22.4% of those age 65 or over.

As of 2022, 89.5% of the population spoke Spanish at home, while those who spoke only English made up 9.0% of the population. All other languages spoken were below 1% of the population.

== Economy ==
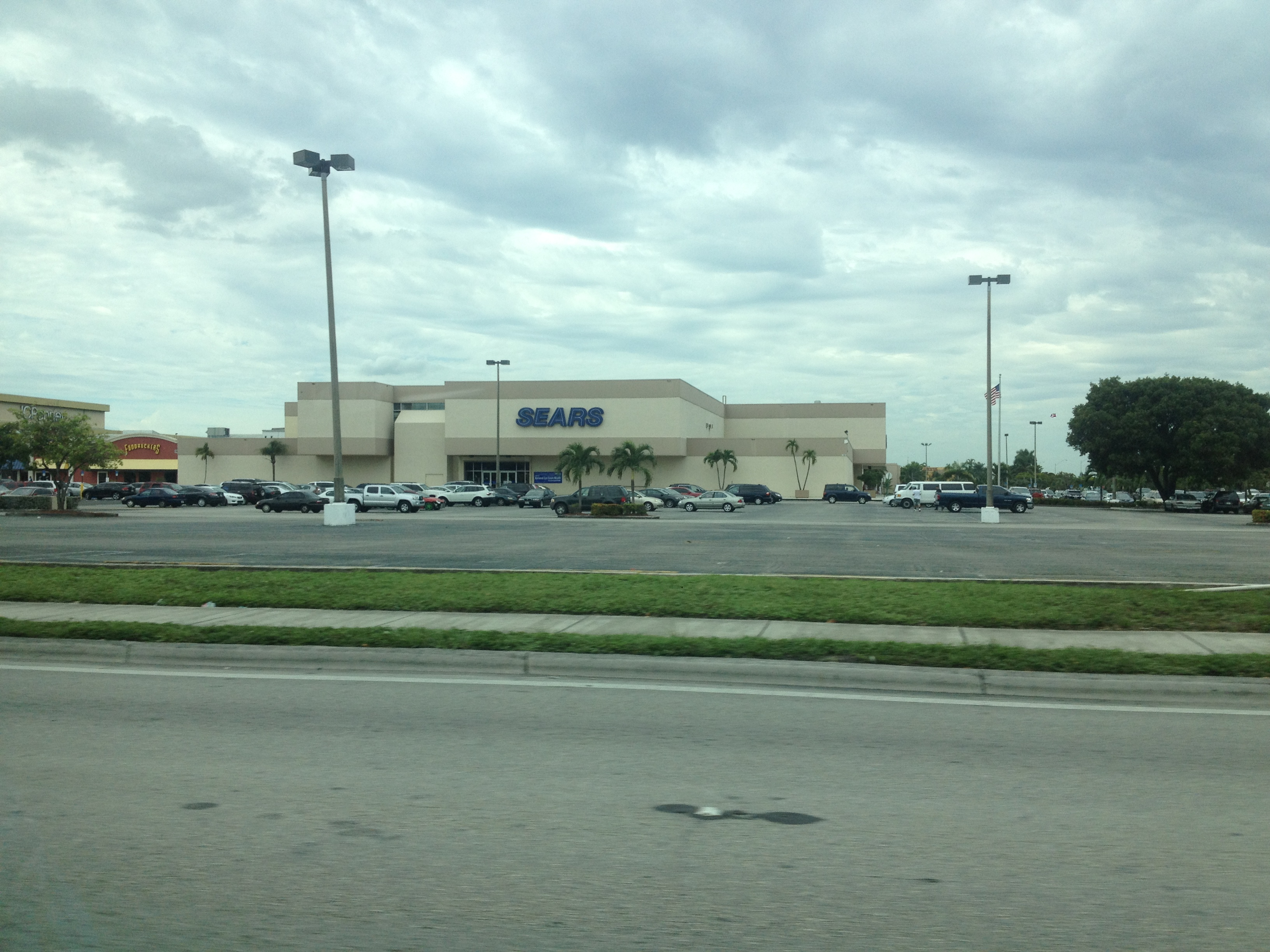
Sears entrance to Westland Mall

The city of Hialeah is a commercial center in Miami-Dade County. The city is host to many national retailers.

Hialeah has many mom-and-pop stores and supermarkets operating on the city's main streets, including those which cater to Latin American and Hispanic clientele.

While most of the manufacturing and cloth industries that made Hialeah an industrial city in the 1970s–1980s have disappeared, new electronics and technology businesses have reinvigorated the local economy. Westland Mall contains over 100 stores and several restaurants. Telemundo, the second largest Spanish-language TV network in the United States, was headquartered at 2340 West 8th Avenue in Hialeah until 2018.

== Parks and recreation ==
In March 2009, it was announced that a $40–$90 million restoration project was set to begin within the year on the Hialeah Park Race Track. On May 7, 2009, the Florida legislature agreed to a deal with the Seminole Tribe of Florida that allowed Hialeah Park to operate slot machines and run Quarter Horse races. The historic racetrack reopened on November 28, 2009, but only for Quarter Horse races. The park installed slot machines in January 2010 as part of a deal to allow for two calendar seasons of racing. The races went on all the way until February 2, 2010. Only a portion of the park has been restored, and an additional $30 million will be needed to complete this first phase of the project. The full transformation is expected to cost $1 billion since the plan includes a complete redevelopment of the surrounding area including the construction of an entertainment complex to include a hotel, restaurants, casinos, stores and a theater. In June 2010 concerns were raised over the preservation of Hialeah Park's historical status, as the planned development threatens to hurt Hialeah Park's status as a National Historic Landmark.

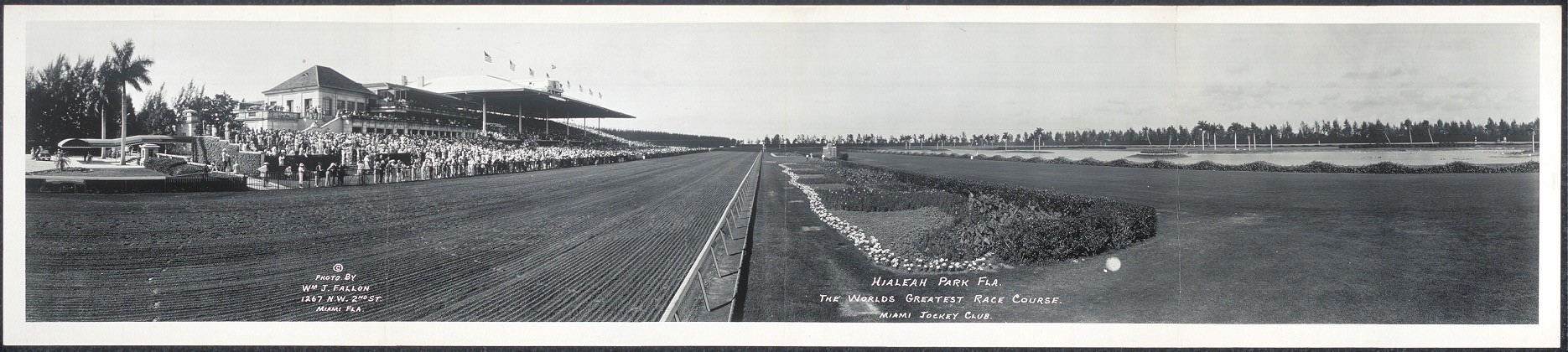
"Hialeah Park, Fla., the world's greatest race course, Miami Jockey Club"

The City of Hialeah is home to three tennis centers, five public swimming pools and aquatic centers, and more than 14 public parks totaling more than 100 acres (0.40 km^{2}) combined. Milander Park features a municipal auditorium and a 10,000 seat football stadium.

Amelia Earhart Park also serves the Hialeah community. Located just south of the Opa Locka Airport, the park consists of 515 acres, including a five-acre Bark Park for dogs. It offers a variety of amenities, programs and activities including mountain biking, soccer, Tom Sawyer's Play Island and Bill Graham Farm Village. It also houses the new Miami Watersports Complex, which offers cable and boat wakeboarding, waterskiing, wake surfing, kneeboarding and paddleboarding.

Starting in 2022 the city has worked on developing the "Leah Arts district" centered around the Factory Town concert venue including bars, music venues, and other entertainment themed businesses.

== Government and infrastructure ==
The University of Florida College of Dentistry operates the Hialeah Dental Clinic. It opened in 1997 to serve Hispanic populations in South Florida.

=== Politics ===
Hialeah is located within Florida's 26th congressional district. It is currently represented in the House of Representatives by Mario Díaz-Balart, a Republican. A 2005 study by the nonpartisan Bay Area Center for Voting Research (BACVR) ranked Hialeah, Florida as the fourth most conservative city in the United States. The current mayor of Hialeah is Bryan Calvo.

As of 2020, Hialeah leaned towards Republican politics. In the 2016 United States presidential election in Florida each of the two major candidates received about half of the vote. For the 2020 United States presidential election in Florida, about two thirds of residents of Hialeah voted for Trump. In 2024, that number increased as 76% of Hialeah voters voted for Trump.

List of mayors of Hialeah, Florida
Dates	Mayor	Notes
1925–1930	John Peter Grethen	Died in office
1930–1933	Robert W. Marshall	Acting Mayor due to vacancy
1933–1935	Grover Cleveland (Doc) Sparks	Namesake of Sparks Park
1935–1937	Dr. Leon H. O'Quinn	
1937–1943	Carl Ault	3 consecutive terms, twice unopposed
1943–1945	Henry Milander	Namesake of Milander Park
1945–1947	Carl Ault	Returned for one term
1947–1975	Henry Milander	Re-elected 8 times; died in office
1975–1981	Dale G. Bennett	
1981–1991	Raúl L. Martínez	Convicted of extortion and racketeering
1991–1993	Julio J. Martinez	Acting mayor
1993–2005	Raúl L. Martínez	
2005–2011	Julio Robaina	
2011–2021	Carlos Hernández	Acting Mayor after Robaina resigned; later elected as Mayor
2021–2025	Esteban Bovo	
2025–2026	Jacqueline Garcia-Roves	Acting Mayor after Bovo resigned
2026–present	Bryan Calvo	

== Education ==
=== Public primary and secondary schools ===
Miami-Dade County Public Schools serves Hialeah.

Two high schools serving the Hialeah community, Mater Academy Charter High School and Miami Lakes Tech, were named as "Silver" award winners in U.S. News & World Report's "Best High Schools 2008 Search".

Institution	Type	Grades	Enrollment	Nickname/mascot
Amelia Earhart Elementary School	Elementary	K–5	473	Airplanes
Ben Sheppard Elementary School	Magnet	K–5	963	Silver Hawks
Bob Graham Education Center	K–8 Center	K–8	1696	Bobcats
City of Hialeah Educational Academy	Charter	9–12	450	Bulldogs
Earnest R. Graham K–8 Academy	K–8 Center	K–8	1455	Eagles
Flamingo Elementary School	Elementary	K–5	950	
Henry H. Filer Middle School	Middle	6–8	1093	Panthers
Hialeah Elementary School	Elementary	K–5	647	Tigers
Hialeah Middle School	Middle	6–8	872	Broncos
Hialeah High School	Senior High	9–12	2874	Thoroughbreds
Hialeah-Miami Lakes High School	Senior High	9–12	1668	Trojans
iPrep Academy @ Hialeah-Miami Lakes	Magnet	9–12	100	Trojans
James H. Bright/J.W. Johnson Elementary School	Elementary	K–5	690	Alligators
John G. DuPuis Elementary School	Elementary	K–5	637	Dolphins
José Martí MAST 6-12 Academy	Magnet	6–12	568	Silver Knights
M.A. Milam K-8 Center	K–8 Center	K–8	976	Colts
Mae M. Walters Elementary School	Elementary	K–5	625	Eagles
Meadowlane Elementary School	Elementary	K–5	985	Tigers
North Hialeah Elementary School	Elementary	K–5	573	Eagles
North Twin Lakes Elementary School	Elementary	K–5	554	
Palm Lakes Elementary School	Elementary	K–5	747	Dolphins
Palm Springs Elementary School	Elementary	K–5	701	Florida Panthers
Palm Springs Middle School	Middle	6–8	1233	Pacers
South Hialeah Elementary School	Elementary	K–5	1107	Sharks
Twin Lakes Elementary School	Elementary	K–5	565	Eagles
Westland Hialeah High School	Magnet	9–12	2137	Wildcats
Youth Co-Op Preparatory Charter School	Charter	K–12		Tigers

=== Private schools ===
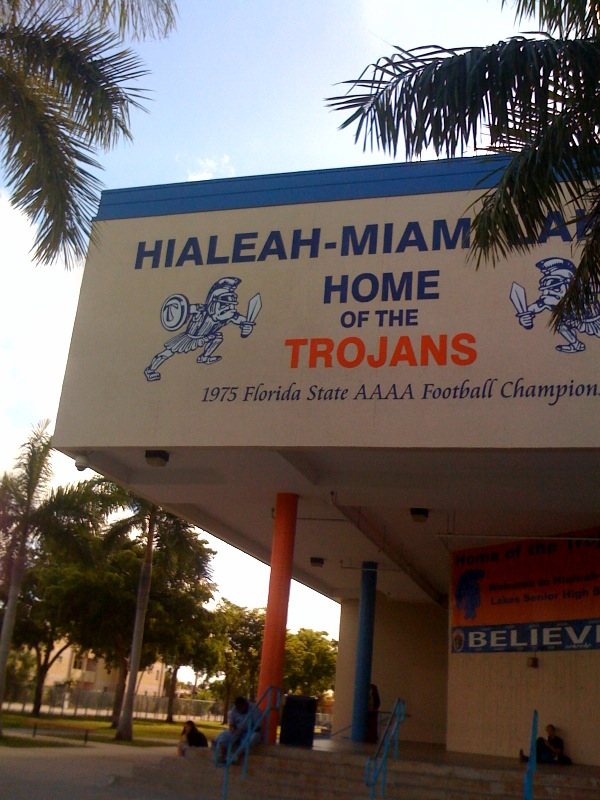
Hialeah-Miami Lakes High

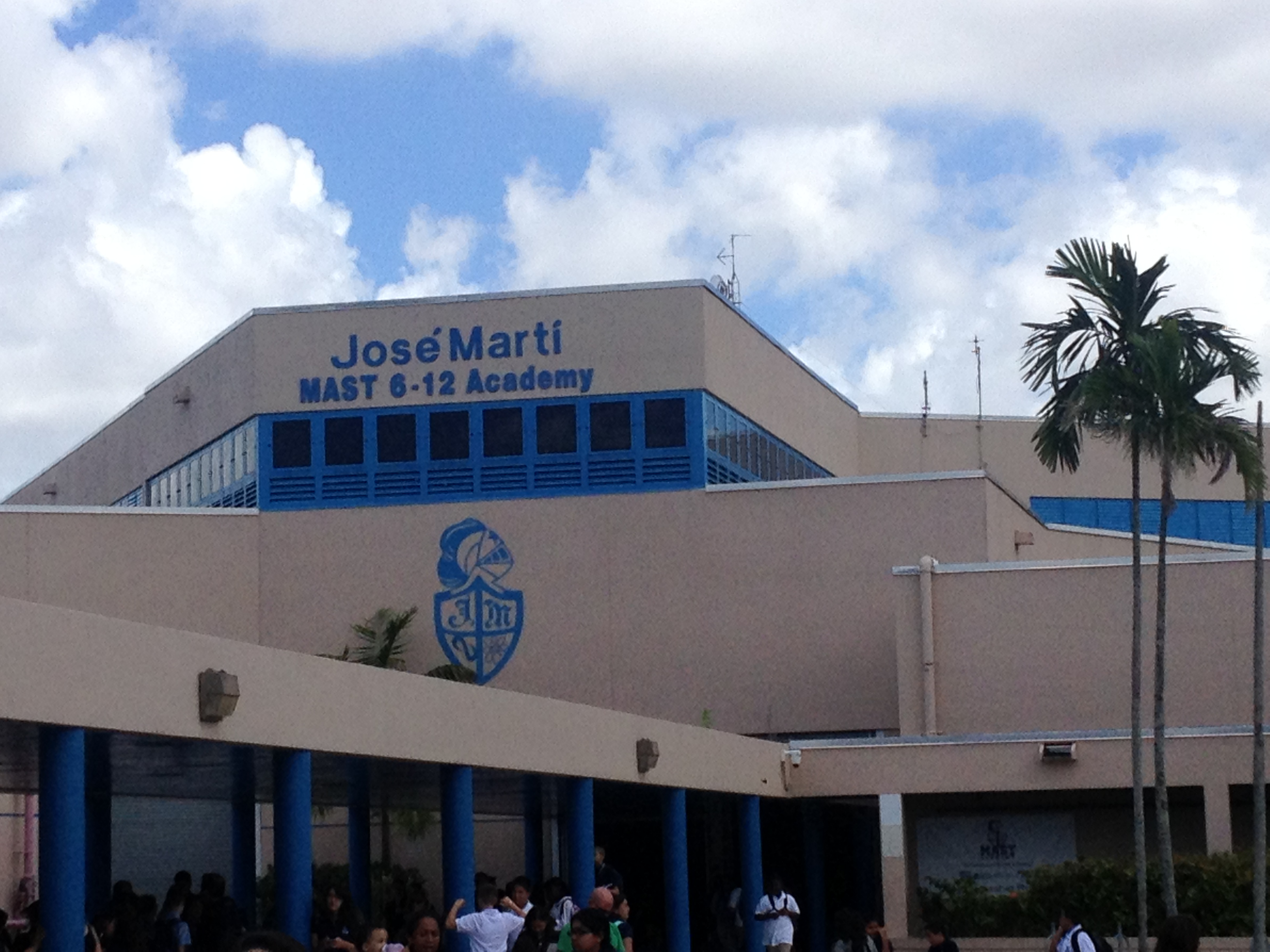
José Martí MAST 6-12 Academy

- Champagnat Catholic School – serves mainly southern and south-central Hialeah
- Edison Private School
- Horeb Christian School
- Immaculate Conception School
- Our Lady of Charity School – a private Catholic school not formally associated with the Roman Catholic Church, located in Hialeah
- St. John the Apostle School – serves mainly southern and south-central Hialeah

=== Post-secondary ===
==== Public colleges ====
- Miami-Dade College Hialeah Campus has served as the city's academic center since 1980. Besides its academic mission, the campus also sponsors numerous cultural and community events.

==== Private colleges and universities ====
- ASA College
- College of Business and Technology
- Florida National University

=== Public library ===
Hialeah's public library was founded in 1924, one year prior to the incorporation of the city. While over the years the county-wide Miami-Dade Public Library System has taken over the libraries of most of the cities in the county, Hialeah public libraries function independently from the county-wide system. The first branch was a donation by the Hialeah Women's Club. It was actually located in the house of one of the Hialeah Women's Club's home. The home of Ms. J Sommers Garwood. The club was founded by Ms. Lua Adams Curtiss, who was the late mother of the famous aviator Glenn Curtiss. The club asked for donations to get the library started and was fortunate enough to receive enough to get the system started. The latest branch, John F. Kennedy Library is now the main library for Hialeah and is easily recognizable for its grand murals. In 2017, the branch set out to renovate the entire library and they added new furniture, the art murals, polished terrazzo floors, and new sculptures. (Note: In 2017, the branch set out to renovate the entire library and they added new furniture, the art murals, polished terrazzo floors, and new sculptures.) The library hosts a print collection, digital resources, and a Hialeah History Collection which collects, preserves and provides access to information about the City of Hialeah's history.

== Transportation ==
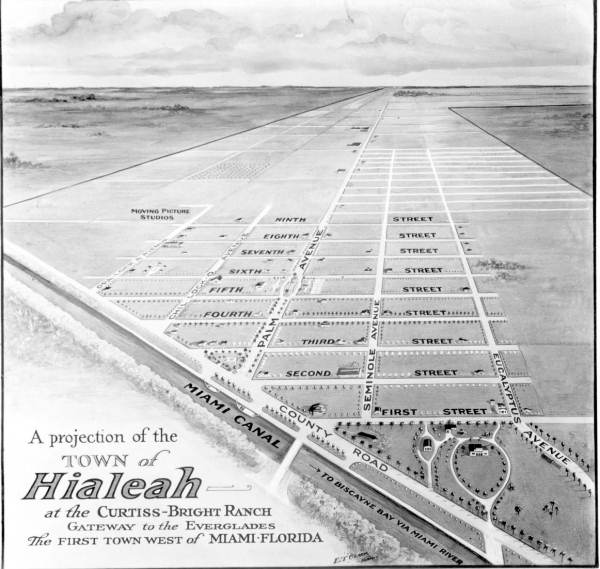
A projection from 1922 that reads "A projection of the town of Hialeah at the Curtiss-Bright Ranch: Gateway to the Everglades, the first town west of Miami, Florida"

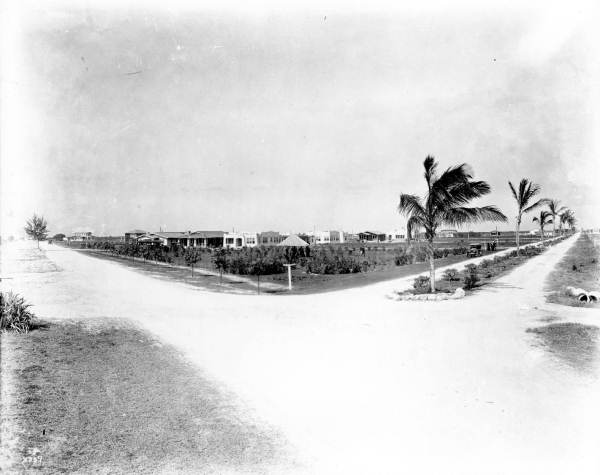
The intersection of Palm Avenue (now President Donald J. Trump Avenue) and County Road (now Okeechobee Road / U.S. 27) in 1921

In 2013, Hialeah was named a top five city with the worst drivers by Slate and Allstate.

=== Rail ===
Hialeah is served by Miami-Dade Transit along major thoroughfares by Metrobus, and by the Miami Metrorail, Tri-Rail, and Amtrak at:

Metrorail:

- Tri-Rail/Metrorail Transfer (North 79th Street and West 37th Avenue)
- Hialeah (East 21st Street and East 1st Avenue)
- Okeechobee (West 19th Street and South Okeechobee Road)

Tri-Rail:

- Tri-Rail/Metrorail Transfer (North 79th Street and West 37th Avenue)
- Hialeah Market (North 41st Street and West 38th Avenue)

Amtrak:

- Amtrak-Miami: Floridian and Silver Meteor service (North 79th Street and West 37th Avenue)

=== Road ===
"All Ways Lead to Hialeah" was one of the city's first slogans. At the time, Glenn Curtiss and James Bright could not have imagined the important link in the transportation chain provided by Hialeah's location. Sitting in the heart of northwest Dade, Hialeah has access to several major thoroughfares, linked by:

- Interstate 75
- State Road 826 (Palmetto Expressway)
- Homestead Extension of Florida's Turnpike
- U.S. Route 27 (Okeechobee Road)
- State Road 924 (Gratigny Parkway)

In November 2023, the Hialeah City Council voted to rename Palm Avenue as President Donald J. Trump Avenue, causing major controversy.

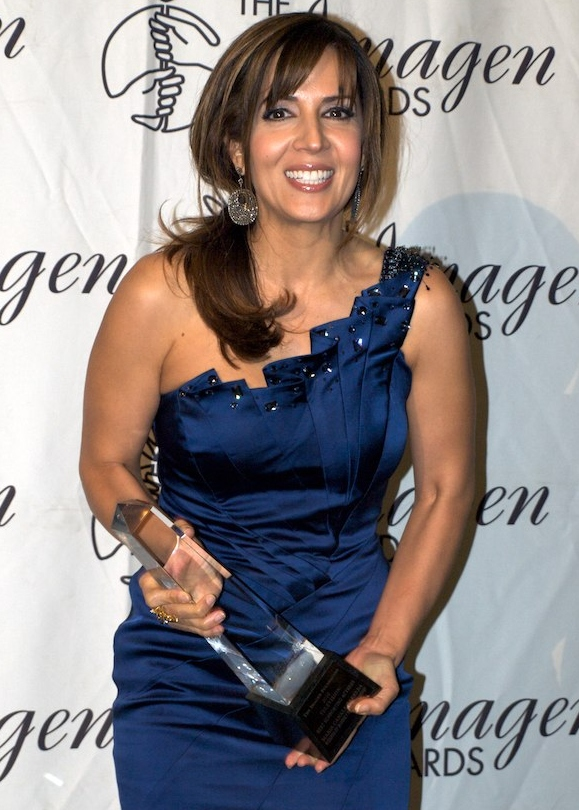
Maria Canals-Barrera

== Notable people ==
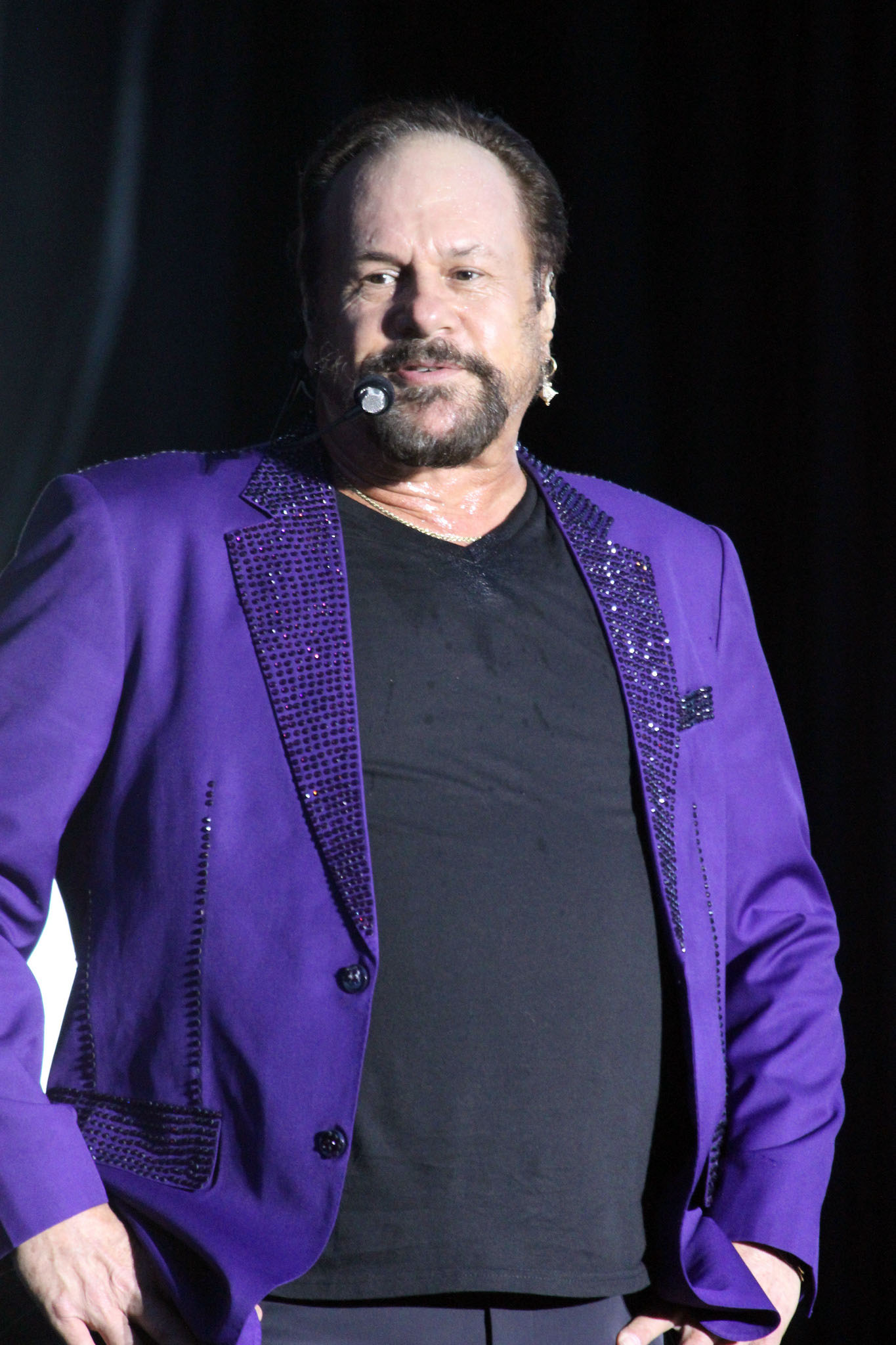
Harry Wayne Casey

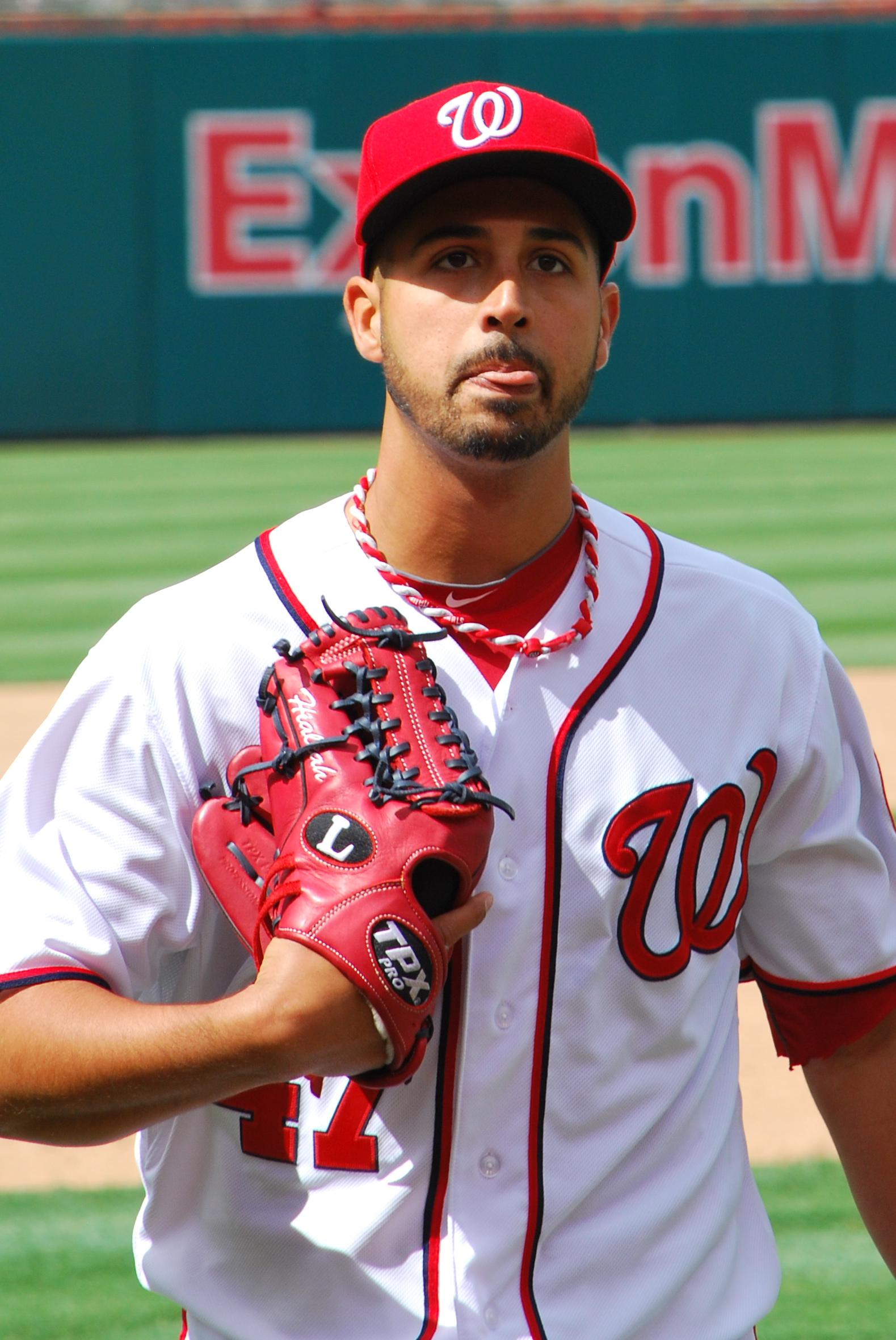
Gio González

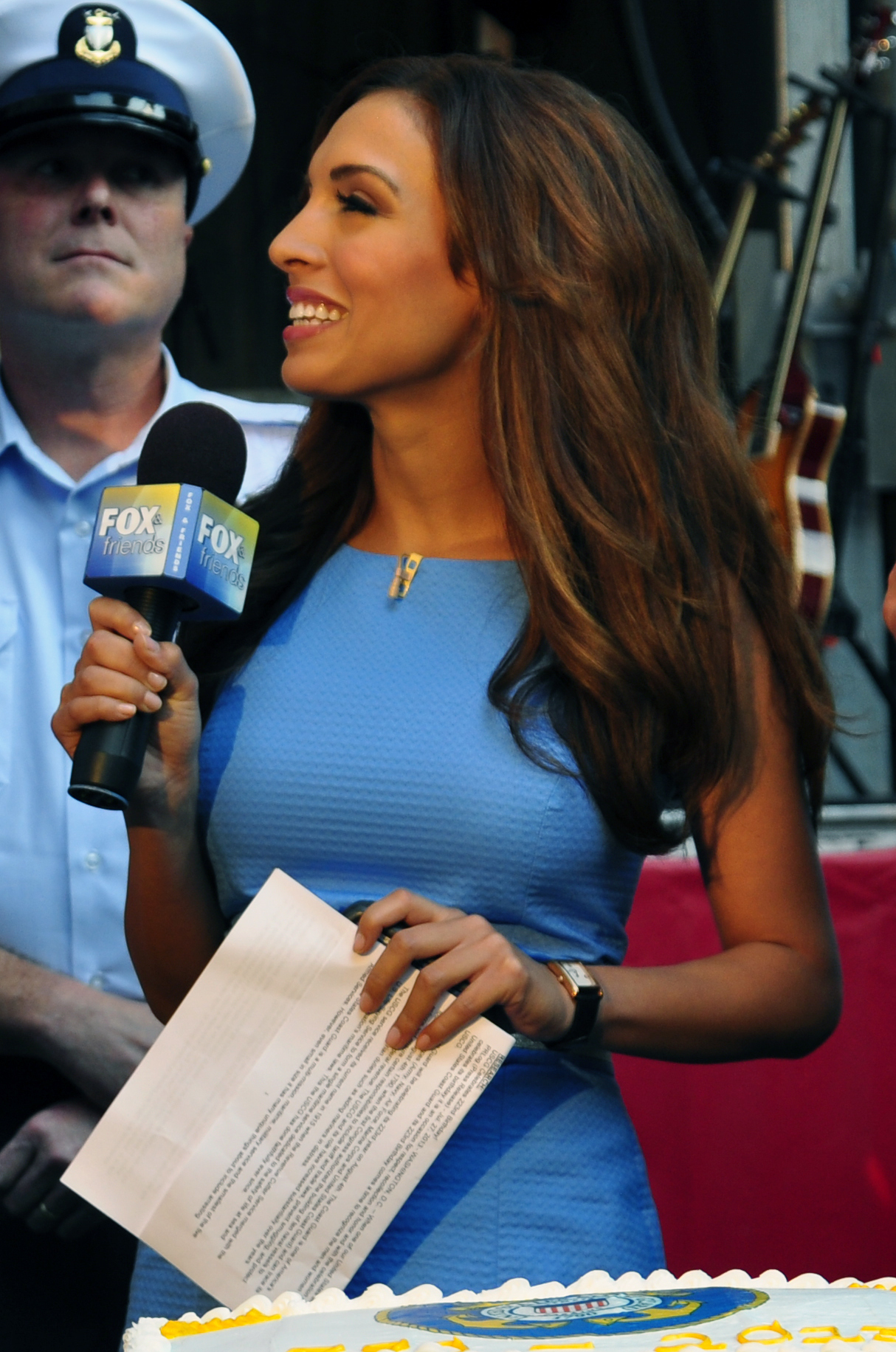
Maria Molina

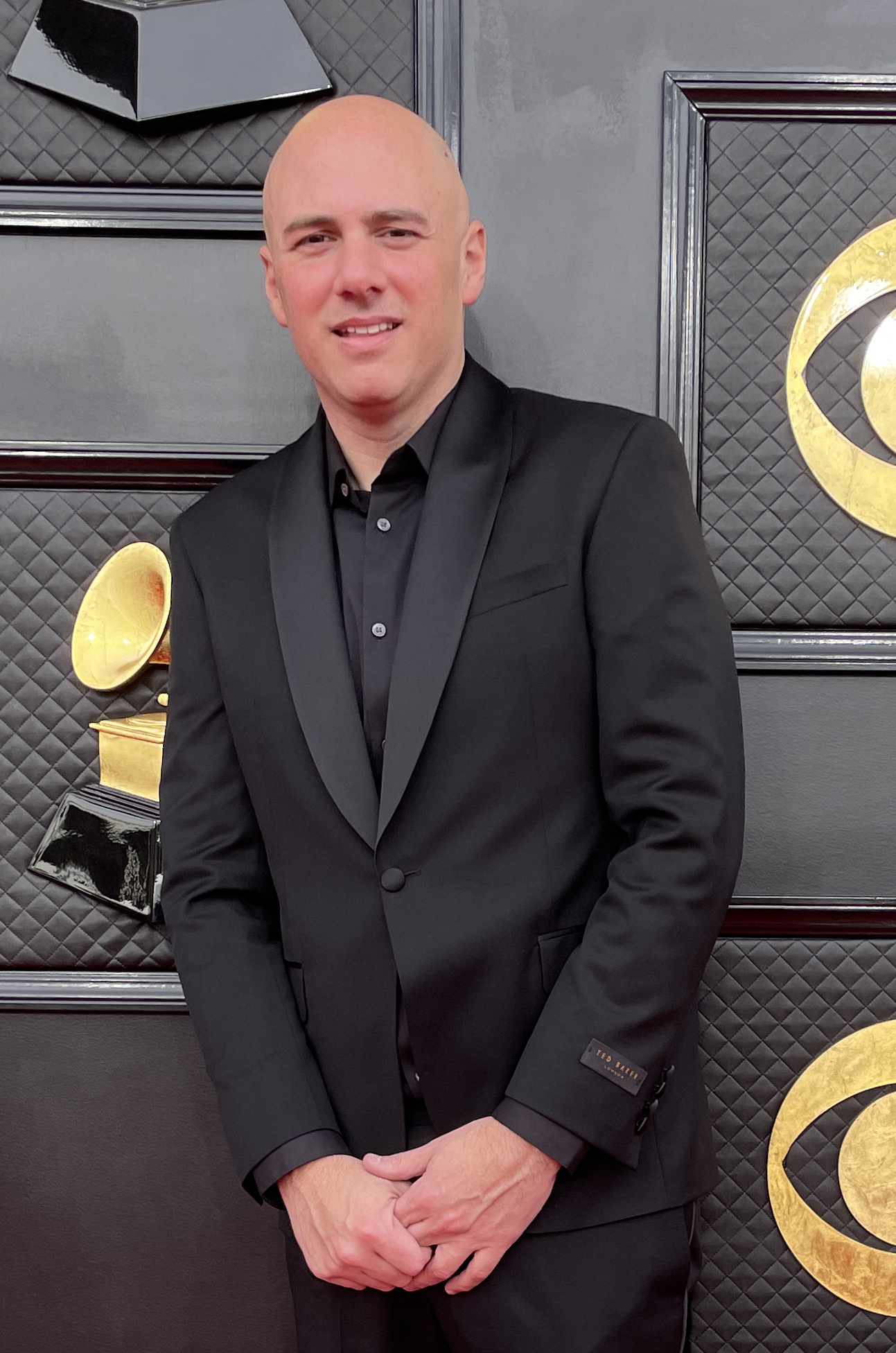
Rocco Valdes

- Agustin Anello, soccer player
- Alex Avila, Major League Baseball player for Arizona Diamondbacks
- Paul E. Beaudoin, composer and interdisciplinary artist
- Jacqueline Becerra, federal judge
- Terry Borcheller, racing driver
- Esteban Bovo, mayor of Hialeah, Florida (2021–2025)
- Devin Bush, NFL free safety for three teams
- Maria Canals-Barrera, actress
- Rene Capo, U.S. Olympic representative as a judoka
- Harry Wayne Casey, lead singer of KC and the Sunshine Band
- Chris Corchiani, NBA guard for three teams
- Nestor Cortes, MLB pitcher for the New York Yankees
- Erik Courtney, Bravo TV personality on Newlyweds: The First Year
- Jack Daugherty, MLB first baseman for three teams
- Rohan Davey, NFL quarterback for three teams
- Nick Davila, MLB pitcher for the Seattle Mariners
- Bucky Dent, professional baseball player for MLB New York Yankees
- Vincent D'Onofrio, actor and producer of stage, film and television
- Nick Esasky, MLB infielder for three teams
- J.C. Escarra, MLB Catcher for the New York Yankees
- Bobby Estalella, MLB catcher for six teams
- Luis Exposito, former Major League Baseball player
- Wifredo A. Ferrer, U.S. attorney for Southern District of Florida
- René García, Hialeah city councilman and Florida State House representative
- Gio González, MLB pitcher for two teams
- Luchi Gonzalez, coach of FC Dallas
- Ted Hendricks, former professional NFL football player
- Charlie Hough, former professional baseball player, Hialeah High graduate
- Richard Hough, former professional baseball player, Hialeah High graduate
- Greg Jackson, professional football player
- Catherine Keener, Oscar-nominated actress
- Barbara Lagoa, judge
- Corey Lemonier, Auburn University and NFL defensive end
- Manny Machado, Major League Baseball third baseman for the San Diego Padres
- Kiel Martin, played J. D. LaRue on Hill Street Blues, Hialeah High graduate
- Lizbet Martínez, Cuban violinist and teacher at M.A. Milam K-8 Center
- Raúl L. Martínez, longest-seated mayor in Hialeah history (1981–2005)
- Maria Molina, meteorologist
- Oscar Múñoz, MLB pitcher for Minnesota Twins
- Roell Preston, professional football player
- Mike Rio, professional mixed martial arts fighter
- Julio Robaina, mayor of Hialeah
- Rick Sánchez, CNN anchor/correspondent
- Jon Secada, Grammy Award–winning musician
- Michael Timpson, NFL wide receiver
- Ariel Torres, U.S. Olympic bronze medalist as a karateka
- Rocco Valdes, music producer, songwriter, music manager
- Pedro Zamora, HIV/AIDS educator, public speaker

== See also ==
- Camp Hialeah, a former base of the United States Forces Korea in Busan, South Korea
