= Lindsey Hopkins Technical College =

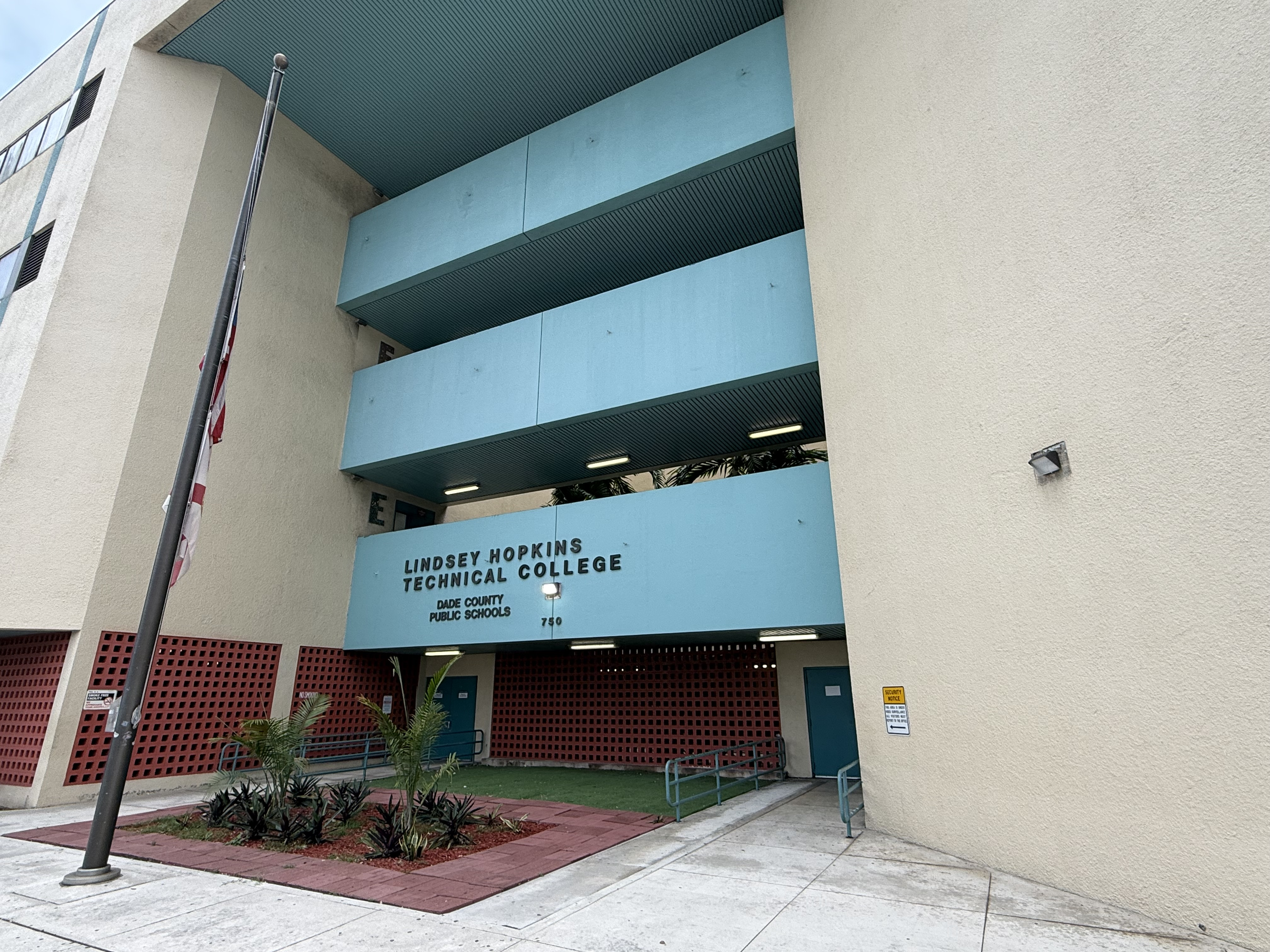
- Entrance to Lindsey Hopkins Technical College
- 750 NW 20th Street, Miami, Florida; United States

Information
- Type: Public, Technical college
- School district: Miami-Dade County Public Schools
- Director: Michael A. Muraro
- Grades: Postsecondary / Adult Education
- Colors: Blue and White
- Website: lindseyhopkins.edu

Lindsey Hopkins Technical College is a public technical college in Miami, Florida. It is part of Miami-Dade County Public Schools and offers career and technical education programs in areas such as health sciences, information technology, culinary arts, business, and trade occupations. The institution serves both adult learners and high school students seeking vocational training.

== History ==
The Roosevelt Hotel, a 15-story structure at 1410 NE Second Avenue, Miami, was left unfinished as a result of the 1926 Miami hurricane and the subsequent Great Depression. In 1936, Lindsey Hopkins Sr., along with Lindsey Hopkins Jr. and his business partner Oscar E. Dooley purchased the derelict building for $38,000.

Following Hopkins Sr.'s death in 1937, Hopkins Jr. sold the renovated Roosevelt Hotel building, valued at over $1 million after subsequent investment, to the Miami-Dade Public School district for a fraction of its value as a memorial to his father. The building was subsequently renamed the Lindsey Hopkins Vocational School, in honor of Lindsey Hopkins Sr.

In 1983 the school relocated to its current, more modern facilities at 750 NW 20th Street. This transition was intended to allow expansion of its programs and the enhancement of its training capabilities. The original building on NE Second Avenue was demolished in 1988.

The new campus at 750 NW 20th Street, is near the Miami Health District. The campus includes specialized labs, workshops, and classrooms designed for hands-on technical and career training.
