= Miami-Dade County Public Schools =

Public school system of Miami-Dade County, Florida, serving Miami

Coordinates: 25°47′19.82″N 80°11′27.95″W

Location
- 1450 NE 2nd Ave., Suite 912, Miami, Florida Florida United States

District information
- Type: Public
- Motto: Giving our students the world.
- Grades: Pre K-12
- Established: July 9, 1885; 141 years ago
- Superintendent: José Dotres
- Schools: 522 (2021–22)
- Budget: $7 billion (2022–23)
- NCES District ID: 1200390

Students and staff
- Students: 337,172 (2023–24) (3rd-largest in U.S.)
- Teachers: 17,365 (on an FTE basis) (2021–22)
- Student–teacher ratio: 18.92

Other information
- Teachers' union: United Teachers of Dade
- Website: dadeschools.net

Miami-Dade County Public Schools (M-DCPS) is the public school district serving Miami-Dade County in the U.S. state of Florida. Founded in 1885, it is the largest school district in Florida, the largest in the Southeastern United States, and the fourth-largest in the United States with a student enrollment of 356,589 as of August 30, 2021.

The district includes all of Miami-Dade County. It is managed by the School Board of Miami-Dade County, which appoints a superintendent to head the administrative portions of the district. Dr. Jose Dotres has been superintendent since February 2022.

Miami-Dade County Public Schools is one of a few public school districts in the U.S. to offer optional international studies programs and bilingual education. Bilingual education is offered in Spanish, French, German, Haitian Creole, and Mandarin Chinese. M-DCPS is the only school district in Florida to offer bilingual education in Mandarin.

As of 2014, 35% of MDCPS teachers are graduates of Florida International University.

== History ==
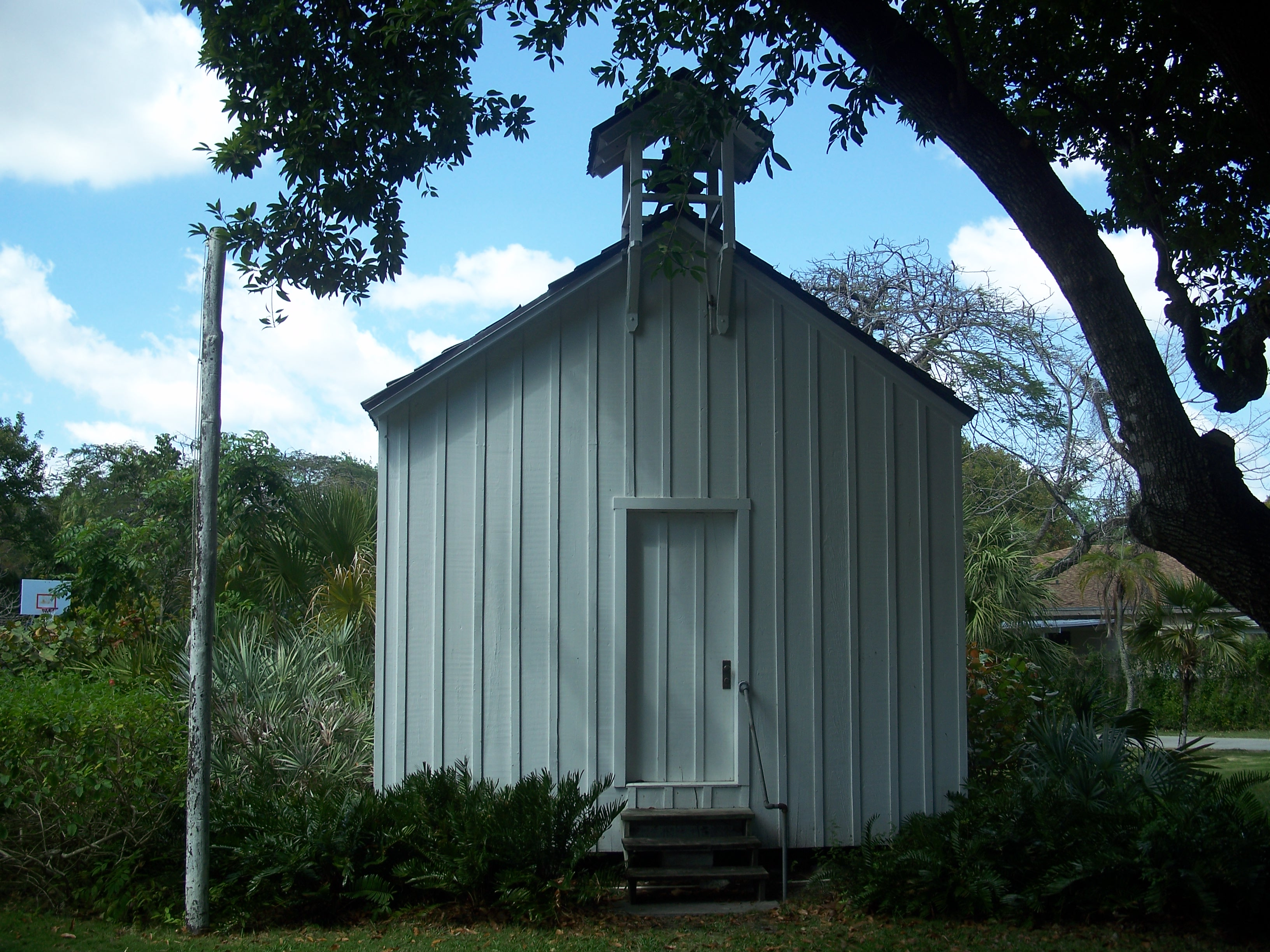
First Coconut Grove Schoolhouse on the grounds of Plymouth Congregational Church in Coconut Grove, Florida

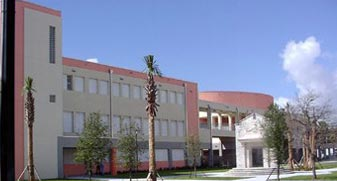
Booker T. Washington High School in Overtown, founded in 1926

=== Beginnings (1800s) ===
The Board of Education for Dade County first met in Miami on June 27, 1885. Those present at the first Board of Education meeting were Superintendent C.H. Lumm, and members of the board, W.H. Benest, Joseph F. Frow, and Adam C. Richards. The main order of business consisted of dividing the county, which at the time included all of what are now Miami-Dade, Broward, Palm Beach and Martin counties, into districts. The board divided Dade County into four districts. The area around Lake Worth was declared District #1, while Miami became known as District #2. Coconut Grove fell within the boundaries of District #3, with Elliott Key, and all other islands or keys, comprising District #4.

The First Coconut Grove School, built in 1887, served as both the religious and educational center of the pioneer community. In 1889, the building was rented to the School Board for the purpose of servicing children in District #3. The first teachers at the First Coconut Grove Schoolhouse included C.L. Trapp and Flora McFarlane. The first students in attendance included Annie and Harry Peacock; John, James, Trinni, and Mary Pent; and Lillian, Grace, Charlie, and Joseph Frow.

The First Coconut Grove Schoolhouse is a one-story, one-room, rectangular structure with a wood frame and a gable roof covered with shingles. In 1970, the schoolhouse was moved from its original location to its current home on the grounds of the Plymouth Congregational Church, at 3429 Devon Road, Coconut Grove, Florida, 33133. The school was added to the National Register of Historic Places in 1975.

=== 1900s to 1930s ===
The turn of the 20th century launched Miami and its school system into decades of growth. By 1924, the county lines had shifted with the creation of Broward, Palm Beach, Lee, and Hendry counties. Despite losing jurisdiction over many of its schools in just twenty years, the school system still boasted 33 separate schools and a student population of nearly 5,000.

Following the 1926 Miami hurricane, many schools were destroyed. The hurricane ended the 1920s land boom in Miami, and ushered in the Great Depression to the area long before the actual market crash of 1929. The crash forced many more schools not destroyed by the hurricane to be closed. Beginning in 1930 the school board faced its first overcrowding and funding problems.

In 1928, Miami Senior High, the district's first secondary school, moved into its fifth and current location. The building cost over $1 million to construct.

In 1926, the original Booker T. Washington Senior High School building opened in what is now the Overtown district. It was the only secondary black high school at the time in South Florida, enrolling students from as far away as Broward and Palm Beach counties.

In 1938, George Washington Carver Sr. High opened in Coral Gables for the black residents of the Coconut Grove and Coral Gables area.

=== 1940s to 1970s ===
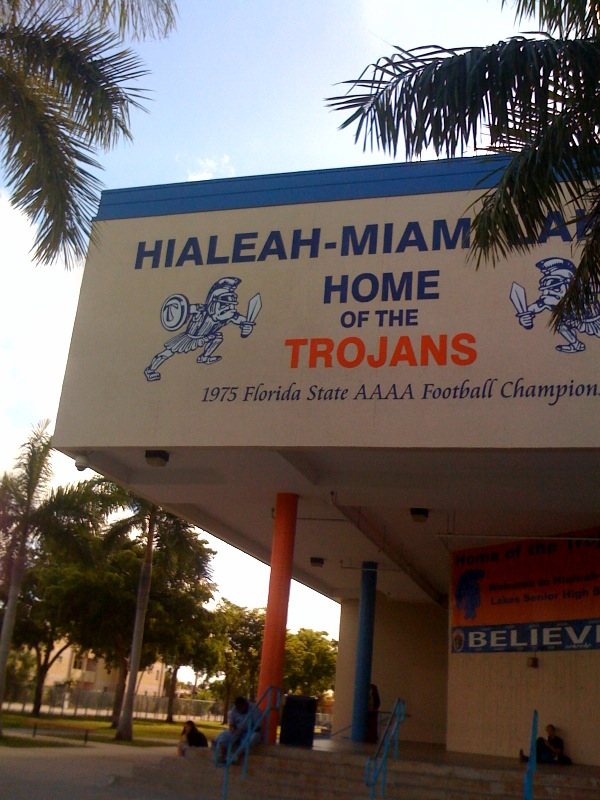
Hialeah-Miami Lakes Senior High School in Hialeah, founded in 1971

In 1936, Lindsey Hopkins Jr. and his father, Lindsey Hopkins Sr., acquired the skeleton of the bankrupt, unfinished Roosevelt Hotel at 1410 NE Second Avenue at public auction for $38,000. They spent a million dollars fixing it up.

In 1941, four years after the elder Lindsey Hopkins' death, Hopkins sold the building to the school board for $225,000 as a memorial to his father.

First classes were held at Lindsey Hopkins Vocational Center in 1941. (The school would later be renamed Lindsey Hopkins Technical College.)

World War II brought another population boom for Miami. Between 1945 and 1975, 16 high schools, 30 middle schools, and 45 grade schools were opened.

Miami Northwestern opened in 1951 to replace D.A. Dorsey, which was converted into a junior high until schools were desegregated. Dade County Public Schools found that it was not operable anymore as a secondary school, so it was turned into an adult educational center.

In 1957, North Dade Jr./Sr. High School opened for grades seven through tenth grades. As the years progressed, the grades went higher, until North Dade graduated its first class in 1960. After the class of 1966, it became a junior high school, and it has remained so since junior high schools were phased out. Also in this year, Miami Dade Schools established the position of Security Assistant, which would evolve into the Miami-Dade Public Schools Police Department.

On the morning of September 7, 1959, 25 African-American students stepped onto the grounds of Orchard Villa Elementary School and Air Base Elementary schools, officially ending segregation within the school system. By the end of the academic year, nearly half the schools in the county had been desegregated when parents were given the option of enrolling their children in any school in the district, providing they had the proper transportation. Despite this law, many schools in Dade County did not become fully integrated until the late 1960s.

In 1961 the school system started a "Spanish for Spanish" program. With help from the Ford Foundation, the program was modified into a full bilingual education curriculum, with a pilot program at Coral Way Elementary School. The program was successful and paved the way for the Bilingual Education Act of 1968.

Beginning in 1962, Dade County schools began to receive their first influx of Hispanic students, mainly from Cuba. This was significant in shaping the school system into what it is today.

The county school system was desegregated in 1970 under school board chairman G. Holmes Braddock.

In 1975, school boundaries were created, forcing students to attend the schools located within their respective areas. This law allowed for any student to attend the closest school, regardless of race or ethnicity.

School populations had flourished throughout most of the 1960s and 70s, but in the late 70s, a teacher walk-out forced a sudden drop in school population, ending rampant overcrowding, and forcing the closing of 11 schools. The sudden drop didn't last very long, as students who had left the school system for private schools began to return by the mid-1980s.

=== 1980s to 1990s ===
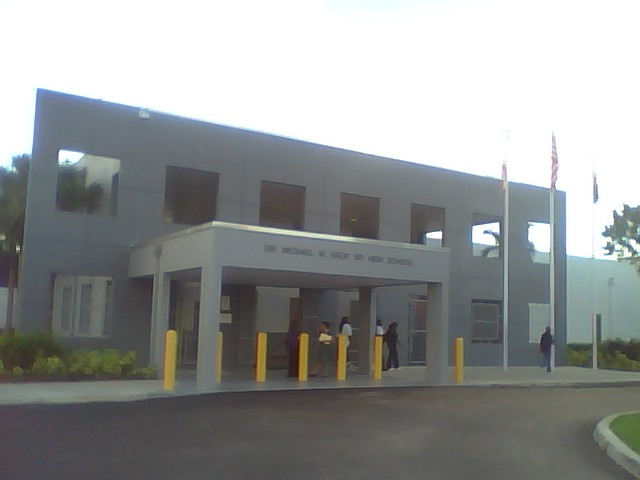
Dr. Michael M. Krop Senior High School in Ives Estates, founded in 1998

Throughout the 1980s, the school district was recognized for expertly assimilating wave after wave of new immigrants, particularly children from Nicaragua and Haiti, and from Cuba's Mariel Boatlift. It was highly regarded for its handling of displaced students after the 1982 Miami riot, in which 14 schools were badly damaged due to fire and vandalism. The Haitian students who came during the 1980s and 1990s were mostly low income, and high school-aged students generally attended Miami Edison High School.

In 1986, the district started the first International Studies Magnet Program at Sunset Elementary School, one of the first such programs in the U.S. This program won the prestigious 2008 Goldman Sachs Prize for Excellence in International Education. It focuses on implementing a challenging curriculum in Spanish, French, and German, in addition to English. This challenging world language curriculum is fully accredited by the governments of Spain, France, and Germany, and is implemented through comprehensive agreements between the Ministries of Education of the partner countries and Miami-Dade County Public Schools. The district, through the International Studies Magnet Program at Sunset Elementary School, started to produce bicultural, bilingual and biliterate students in English and their choice of Spanish, French, or German.

Following Hurricane Andrew in 1992, Dade County was commended for its speed at rebuilding and reopening schools. Most schools reopened within two weeks of the storm, and students who attended schools that had been completely destroyed were quickly displaced with free and efficient bus transportation. The district also used funding from the disaster to redo its entire curriculum, adding sex education to elementary schools, and foreign language programs to middle schools. It opened fully funded magnet schools such as Coral Reef High School and Southwood Middle School, which take in students from all over the county based on school performance (some schools are partial magnets, which also enroll students from surrounding neighborhoods, while some are full magnets that only take students based on merit). The district also re-opened Coral Way Elementary as its first bilingual school, which teaches its curriculum in both English and Spanish.

In 1996, the school board revamped itself under pressure to boost minority representation, expanding from seven to nine members, all elected for the first time from single-member districts. Due to this, its number of black members doubled, and its Hispanic members quadrupled. The board also began a new program to create K-8 centers as a way of relieving overcrowding in middle schools.

In 1997, Dade County formally changed its name to Miami-Dade County, and the school board subsequently changed its name as well.

=== 2000s to 2010s ===
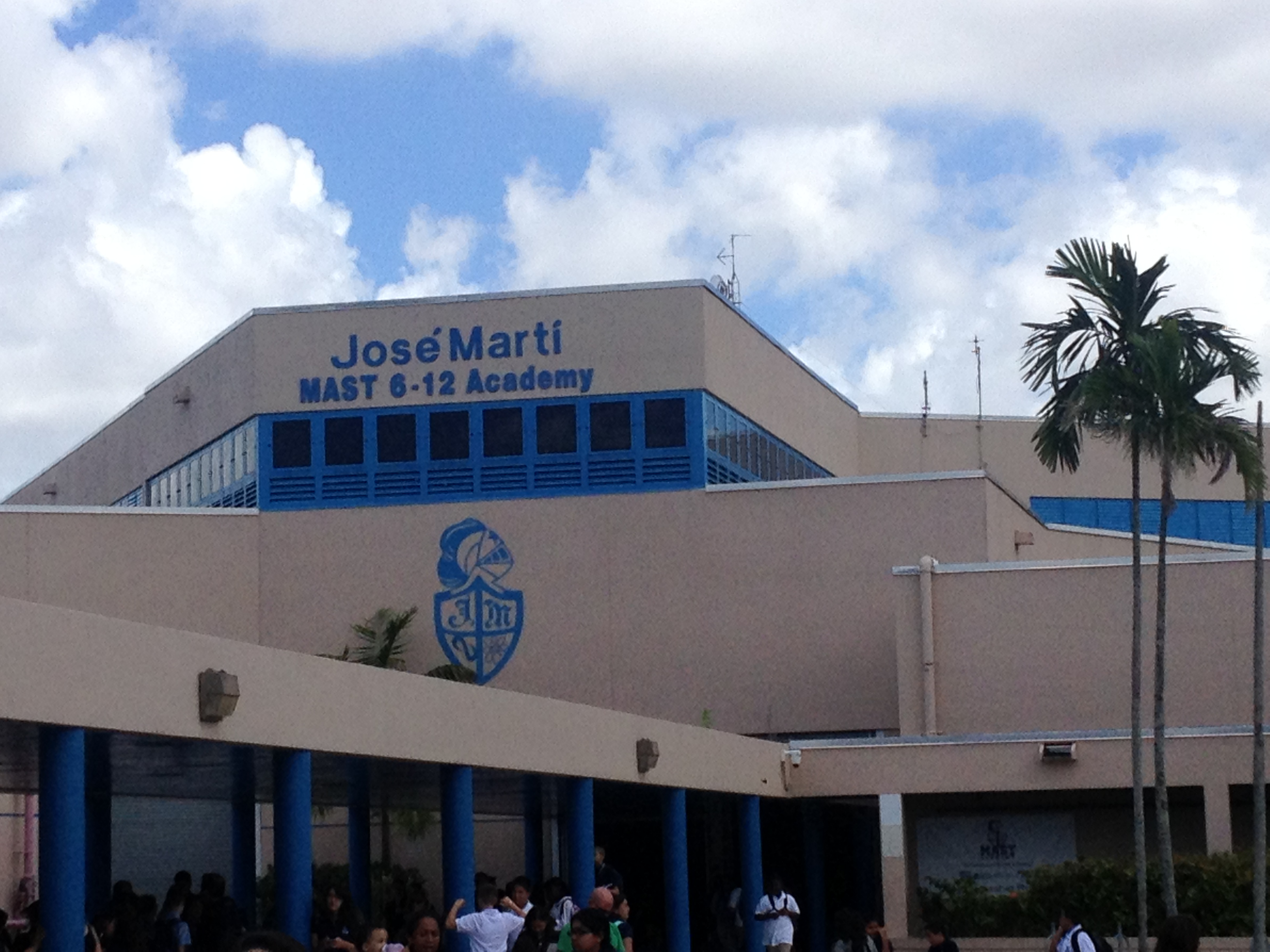
José Martí MAST 6-12 Academy in Hialeah expanded to become a magnet school in 2011.

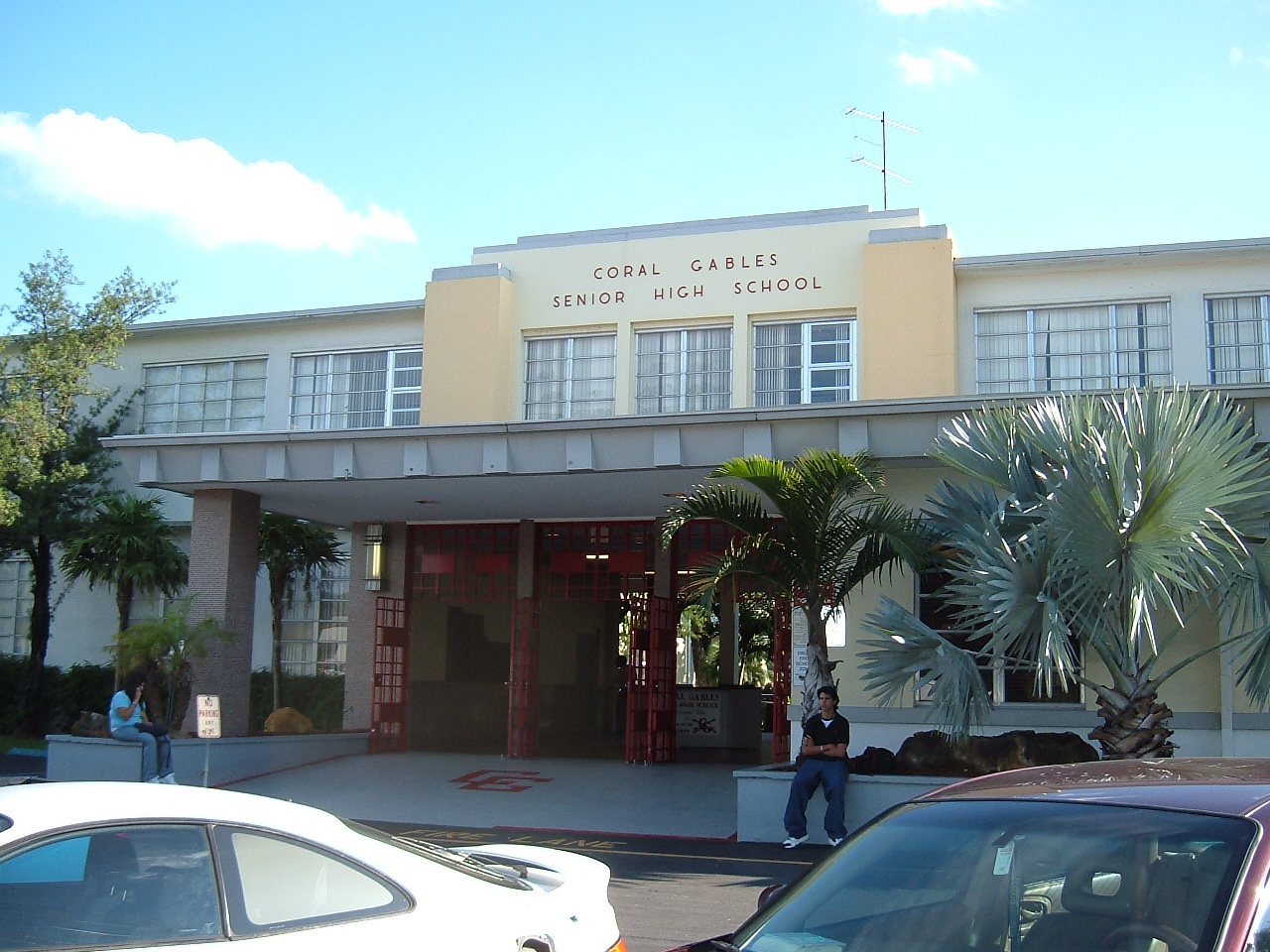
Coral Gables Senior High School in Coral Gables, founded in 1950

The early 21st century was characterized by the widespread adoption of information technology for everyday use by classroom teachers, students, and parents. One noteworthy process was the phased introduction of Excelsior Software's Electronic Gradebook, Riverdeep software, BrainPOP, TeenBiz and FCAT Explorer. During the 2010s, Edmodo was also phased into the classrooms of Miami-Dade.

School population became a problem again in the early 21st century, with G. Holmes Braddock High School, Barbara Goleman High School, and Miami Springs High School reaching student populations of over 4,500. The sudden influx in student population has forced the school system to build and open nearly 40 new schools in many parts of the county – an ongoing project today.

In October 2001, Deputy Superintendent Henry Fraind retired under pressure after it was discovered that a clique of longtime administrators and powerful outsiders had exploited the district's vast resources. Fraind had received his Ph.D. from Pacific Western University (Hawaii) in 1982, a noted diploma mill.

Beginning April 26, 2004, under then new superintendent Dr. Rudy Crew, the school year was begun three weeks earlier in order to synchronize the school district with the rest of the state. Until this point, Miami-Dade County Schools was the only district whose students began school the last week of August rather than the first. This measure was also implemented to allow schools more time to ready themselves for the state's FCAT exam.

In accordance with measures set forth by the state, any school that had been graded as a D or F on the FCAT the previous academic year were put on an academic probation by the school board, giving the administration three years to bring the school's grade up to a C or higher before taking drastic measures, such as firing all teachers and administrators or removing funding for extracurricular activities.

In September 2008, the school board bought out Dr. Rudy Crew's contract with the district due to mismanaging the budget and his relations with other board members. He was replaced by Alberto Carvalho, who was previously a science teacher in this school system.

The school district is currently being monitored by the Florida Department of Education due to having extremely low monetary reserves. Since Carvalho's appointment, reserves have increased from 0.5% to 1.3% of the operating budget; however, this is well below the 5% recommended practice.

After the 2010 Haiti earthquake the district leadership anticipated that there would be thousands of survivors arriving, that most students arriving would be poor, and that most high school-aged students would be going to Miami Edison High School. The district planned to establish housing for refugees at a Baptist hospital in Homestead. By January 2011, there were 1,403 survivors from that earthquake enrolled at M-DCPS, which was below the predicted number, and most of them were in the middle and upper classes. The hospital was never needed. The largest number of high school-aged students, 88, enrolled at North Miami High School. 51 enrolled at Felix Varela High School, and only six enrolled at Miami Edison. MDCPS had the highest number of 2010 Haiti earthquake survivors of any U.S. school district.

In the early 2010s, a larger emphasis was placed on advanced education and magnet programs. New magnet schools and programs were opened. Schools that were already opened also made the decision to introduce magnet programs within the school, such as HML's iPrep Academy, and some schools decided to rebrand themselves as full-on magnet schools, such as José Martí Middle becoming José Martí MAST 6-12 Academy. In 2013, 100 new programs, including 49 iPrep Academies, were opened.

In 2013, the state of Florida announced it would replace the FCAT statewide with Partnership for Assessment of Readiness for College and Careers (PARCC) exams. The PARCC exams were planned for introduction during the 2014–2015 school year. Concerns over PARCC include longer testing times. In comparison to the FCAT's 12-day testing window, PARCC would be spread out over 20 days. There were concerns over the fact that PARCC had not yet, as of 2013, been "developed, designed, nor tested."

=== 2020s ===
In September 2020, during the COVID-19 pandemic, the school district experienced a DDoS attack against their network.

In December 2021, Carvalho announced he would be departing from his position as the school district's superintendent. School board members voted Jose L. Dotres as his replacement in a 6–3 vote in January 2022.

In 2023, Bob Graham Education Center in Miami Lakes within the Miami-Dade system banned the inaugural poem of Amanda Gorman, following the complaint of a parent.

== Superintendent of schools ==
- Rudy Crew (2004–2008)
- Alberto M. Carvalho (2008–2022)
- José L. Dotres (2022–present)

== School board members ==
- Steve Gallon III – District 1
- Dorothy Bendross-Mindingall - District 2
- Joseph S. Geller – District 3
- Roberto J. Alonso – District 4
- Danny Espino – District 5
- Mari Tere Rojas – District 6 (chair)
- Mary Blanco – District 7
- Monica Colucci – District 8 (vice-chair)
- Luisa Santos – District 9

== Student advisor to the school board ==
The student advisor is elected by the Miami-Dade County District Student Government Association, and sits as an advisor to the board during meetings as a representative of the organization. The student advisor speaks and responds to questions from the board on student-related issues.

== Student enrollment ==
The total student enrollment of Miami-Dade County Public Schools as of August 30, 2016 was 370,656.

The breakdown of students is shown below.

- Active students: 345,545
- Pre-K students: 6,931
- Part-time students: 476
- Current adult/vocational students: 17,124
- Co-enrolled in high school: 580

Pre-K: 1,533
Kindergarten: 23,555
Grade 1: 25,014
Grade 2: 26,423
Grade 3: 28,679
Grade 4: 26,056
Grade 5: 27,110
Grade 6: 25,784
Grade 7: 26,053
Grade 8: 26,654
Grade 9: 27,211
Grade 10: 27,740
Grade 11: 27,341
Grade 12: 26,392

The district is the second-largest minority-majority public school system in the country. As of 2012, 62% of MDCPS students were of Hispanic origin (of any race), 25% Black, 10% Non-Hispanic White, 3% other and multiracial. Of the students enrolled in MDCPS, 54% spoke Spanish at home, 5% spoke Haitian Creole, and less than 1% spoke French and Portuguese at home. 45% of students were enrolled in bilingual Spanish language programs, and an additional 23% were enrolled in other bilingual programs in French, German, Italian, Mandarin, Portuguese, and Haitian Creole.

== Schools ==
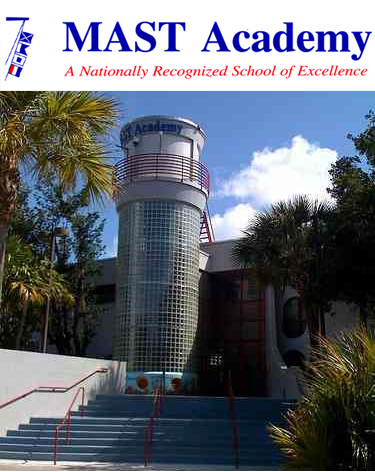
MAST Academy on Virginia Key, founded in 1991

As of 2006 most newly named schools received names after people working for or involved with M-DCPS, and district rules allow schools to be named after people who are still alive. Relatively few schools were named after highly famous people.

=== School rankings ===
==== U.S. News & World Report ====
The following MDCPS high schools were ranked in U.S. News & World Report's annual "America's Best High Schools" rankings:

National ranking		Top 200 public high schools in the United States		
2012	2009	School	Enrollment	Location
16	15	Design and Architecture Senior High School (DASH)	483	Design District, Miami
26	NR	Young Women's Preparatory Academy	304	Little Havana, Miami
50	NR	International Studies Charter High School	304	Little Havana, Miami
73	66	Maritime and Science Tech High School (MAST)	550	Virginia Key, Miami
131	95	Coral Reef Senior High School	3,007	Richmond Heights, Unincorporated Miami-Dade County
183	NR	Doral Performing Arts and Entertainment Academy	104	Doral
186	82	New World School of the Arts	489	Downtown, Miami

Florida ranking	Top 50 public high schools in Florida	
2012	School	Location
1	Design and Architecture Senior High School (DASH)	Design District, Miami
2	Young Women's Preparatory Academy	Little Havana, Miami
7	International Studies Charter High School	Little Havana, Miami
11	Maritime and Science Tech High School (MAST)	Virginia Key, Miami
15	Coral Reef Senior High School	Richmond Heights, Unincorporated Miami-Dade County
16	Doral Performing Arts and Entertainment Academy	Doral
17	New World School of the Arts	Downtown Miami
28	Miami Beach Senior High School	South Beach, Miami Beach
43	Mater Academy East High School	Little Havana, Miami
47	Doral Academy High School	Doral

National ranking	Top 10 U.S. magnet high schools	Location
2 (2009)	Design and Architecture Senior High School (DASH)	Design District, Miami

==== Newsweek ====
In 2011, Newsweek's rankings of the 500 Best High Schools in America, eight MDCPS schools were ranked:

National ranking	School	Enrollment	Location
28. (4th in Florida)	School for Advanced Studies	525	North, South, Wolfson and Homestead campuses, at Miami Dade College, Miami-Dade County
46. (7th in Florida)	Maritime and Science Tech High School (MAST)	550	Virginia Key, Miami
53.	Coral Reef Senior High School	3,007	Richmond Heights, Unincorporated Miami-Dade County
251.	Miami Palmetto Senior High School	4,093	Pinecrest
374.	Doctors Charter School of Miami Shores	525	Miami Shores
404.	Mater Academy Charter School	4,000	Hialeah Gardens
427.	Mater Academy Lakes High School	2,000	Unincorporated Miami-Dade County
456.	Doral Academy Charter High School	2,000	Doral

== Broadcasting ==
MDCPS owns and operates WLRN-TV (Channel 17), a PBS member television station, and WLRN-FM (91.3 FM), an NPR member radio station.

== Notable employees ==
- Tombi Bell (1979–), played for the Florida Gators, 1997–2001; drafted by the Minnesota Lynx in the 2001 WNBA draft; physical education teacher at José Martí MAST 6-12 Academy as of 2013
- Jay W. Jensen (1931–2007), taught drama at Miami Beach Senior High School for 32 years; students included movie stars Mickey Rourke and Andy Garcia actor who appeared in 27 films, 1958–2006
- Lizbet Martinez (1982–), as of 2013, teaches music and language arts at the M.A. Milam K-8 Center; became famous after playing "The Star-Spangled Banner" on her violin when the U.S. Coast Guard picked her and her family out of a raft in 1994
- Bertha Vazquez (1990–), teaches science at G. W. Carver Middle School and directs the Teacher Institute for Evolutionary Science

== See also ==
- Education in Florida
- Broward County Public Schools
