= MAST Academy =

Coordinates: 25.7388889°N 80.1663889°W

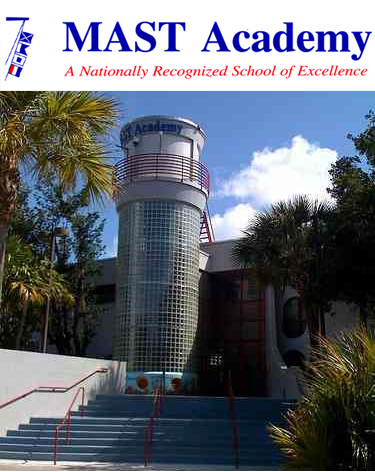
- Virginia Key, Miami, Florida; United States

Information
- Type: Public magnet
- Established: 1990
- School district: Miami-Dade County Public Schools
- Principal: Michael Gould
- Teaching staff: 79.00 (FTE)
- Grades: 6-12
- Enrollment: 1,538 (2023-2024)
- Student to teacher ratio: 19.59
- Colors: Red, Blue, and White
- Mascot: Isurus
- Nickname: Mako Sharks
- Newspaper: The Beacon
- Yearbook: Mako Fuka
- School hours: 8:00AM to 3:00PM
- Website: https://www.gomakos.net/

Maritime and Science Technology Academy, commonly referred to as MAST Academy, or MAST, is a public high school on Virginia Key in Miami, Florida. MAST Academy is a magnet school under the governance of Miami-Dade County Public Schools. The school's principal is Dr. Michael Gould. U.S. News & World Report ranked MAST as the 42nd best high school in the nation as of 2015.

The academic focus of MAST Academy is primarily marine studies. Students choose one of three major areas of study in which a traditional U.S. high school curriculum is infused with maritime-related subjects. These areas are Oceanic and Atmospheric Sciences (OAS), Maritime Studies and Culture (MSC), and Marine Related Industries (MRI). Special course offerings include Marine Science, Oceanography, Solar Energy, Environmental Science, Swimming, and Water Safety.

MAST Academy is located on Virginia Key, a barrier island between Miami and Key Biscayne, across the street from the Miami Seaquarium and within walking distance of the University of Miami's Rosenstiel School of Marine, Atmospheric, and Earth Science.

== History ==
In 1990, MAST Academy was established in Key Biscayne.

In 2012, the school announced that it would expand by 1,100 seats, with preference given to eligible Key Biscayne residents. It was controversial and highly debated whether residents of the Village of Key Biscayne should be opened up to all Key Biscayne high school students. A former student was reported as claiming, "I can't believe they are going to turn over the school to the affluent residents of Key Biscayne in return for $9 million," adding, "it will really destroy what MAST is all about."

In April 2015, a school shooting threat was posed toward MAST Academy, as a note was found reading, "On April 17, 2015 I will walk into this school and shoot everyone I see." Some students decided to attend school on the day of the supposed shooting. In an interview with NBC 6 South Florida, one student was claimed his reasoning for attending to be, "I just really like learning, so I like going to class, and I'm not afraid." Miami-Dade County Public Schools Superintendent Alberto M. Carvalho later tweeted, "I am always impressed by the composure of our student body. 'I am not scared. I am here to learn.'"

MAST Academy now is a secondary school from 6-12 grade. Tours are available on Tuesdays during the academic year and are provided by their leadership students. No registration required.

=== Franchising ===
Due to the reputation of the school, Miami-Dade County Public Schools began "franchising" MAST. In 2010, MAST Medical @ Homestead was established. In 2011, José Martí Middle School introduced its magnet program with a high school expansion in 2011, before completely re-branding itself as José Martí MAST 6-12 Academy in 2013. In 2013, another MAST high school opened at a Florida International University campus, called MAST @ FIU Biscayne Bay Campus.

=== Awards and recognition ===
During the 1994–96 and 2006-07 school years, MAST Academy was recognized with the Blue Ribbon School Award of Excellence by the United States Department of Education, the highest award an American school can receive.

MAST Academy was one of six national finalists in the 2010 White House "Commencement Challenge". People from across the nation voted to determine which school would host President Barack Obama as a commencement speaker.

MAST has established a tradition of academic excellence, and has been ranked among Newsweek's Top 100 High Schools several times. It has been listed as one of "Miami-Dade's Best Schools", and, as of 2014, is ranked 10th in Florida.

=== Planet Ocean ===
MAST Academy is currently housed in the former Planet Ocean museum. Planet Ocean was an 80,000 sq.ft., interactive oceanographic museum featuring state of the art, hands on exhibits about the ocean (such as a giant piece of touchable iceberg), displays of deep sea submersibles, multi-media presentations, and other educational experiences.

The museum opened in the mid-seventies and was located across the street from the Miami Seaquarium on Virginia Key. Planet Ocean had trouble attracting enough visitors to be self-sustaining; it closed in 1991.

== Demographics ==
As of 2024, the school has an enrollment of 1548 students. As of 2013, the breakdown of the student's ethnicity is 60% Hispanic, 23% White, 10% Black, 5% Asian, and 2% unknown.

== Extracurricular activities ==
The school's primary sports are water polo and swimming. The school also offers a boys' basketball team, boys' and girls' cross country teams, boys' and girls' soccer teams, boys' and girls' golf teams, boys' and girls' tennis teams, and a girls' volleyball team as of 2019.

MAST is active in the National Ocean Sciences Bowl Competition, where it placed first in the region and fifth place in the nation in 2006. The Black History Brain Bowl team won the 2006 Regional Championships.

MAST is home to the first Coast Guard JROTC unit in the country.

The school's mascot is a mako shark named Isurus, after retiring a pelican named Pete.

The robotics and engineering team, the MAST Academy Mecha Makos, founded in 2006, has competed in numerous competitions including Youth Fair, MATE, FIRST, and FIU's Wall of Wind competition. The Mecha Makos qualified for the VEX World Championship in the 2011, 2012, and 2013 school years.

== Publications ==
The Beacon, MAST's student-run newspaper, and the yearbook, Mako Fuka, have received gold medals from the Columbia Scholastic Press Association.

== Notable alumni ==
- Akierra Missick, Deputy Premier of the Turks and Caicos Islands
