= José Martí MAST 6-12 Academy =

Coordinates: 25°52′29″N 80°19′50″W

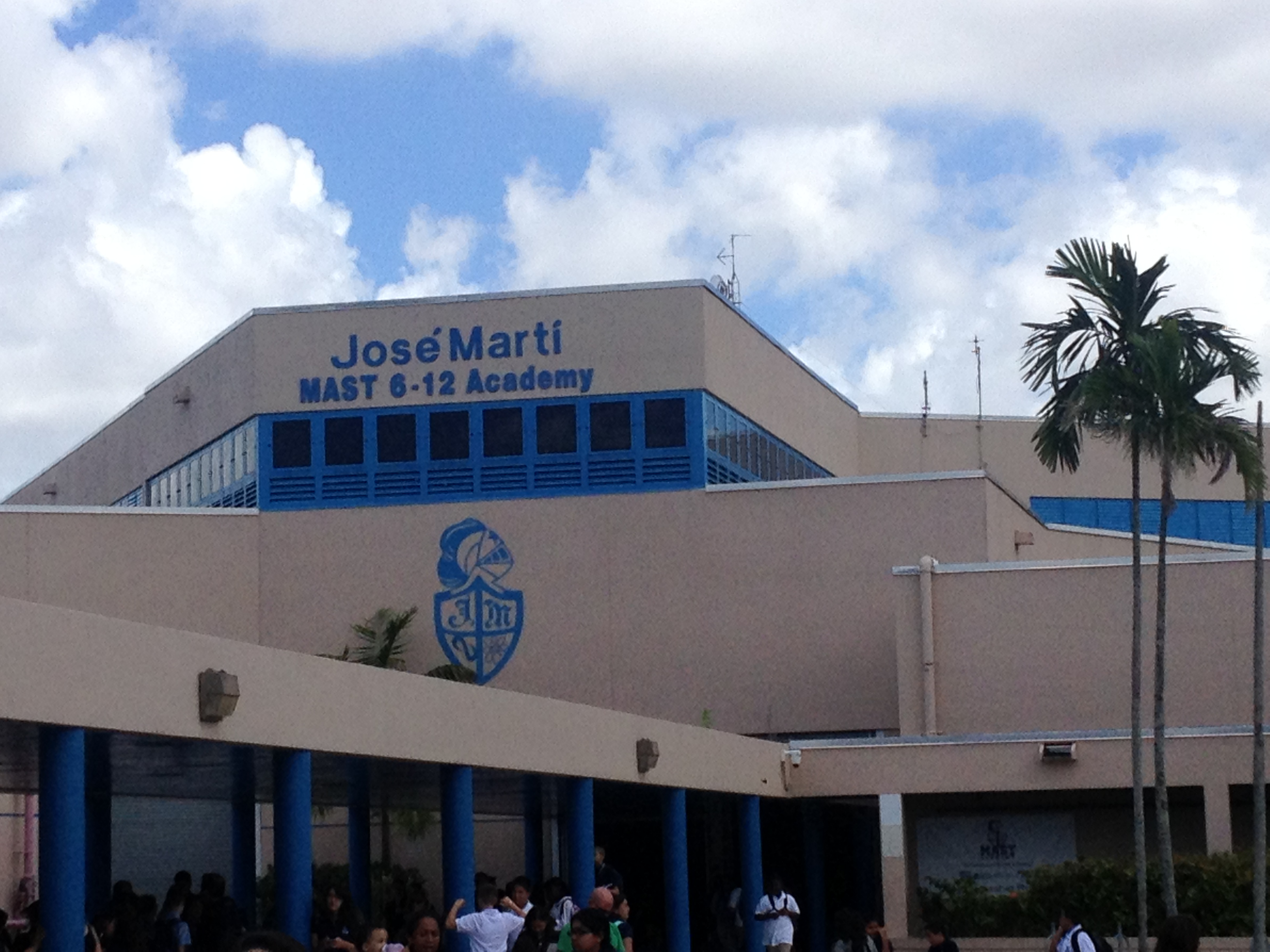
José Martí MAST 6-12 Academy

Location
- 5701 W. 24 Ave; Hialeah, Florida 33016; United States

Information
- Type: Public magnet
- Motto: Where Learning Means More Doing. That’s the Power of MAST!
- Established: as José Martí Middle: 1987 as José Martí MAST: August 2011
- School district: Miami-Dade County Public Schools
- Principal: José Enriquez Jr.
- Staff: 42.00 (FTE)
- Grades: 6-12
- Enrollment: 902 (2022–2023)
- Student to teacher ratio: 21.48
- Colors: Silver, Navy Blue, White
- Mascot: Marty the Knight
- Nickname: Silver Knights
- School Grade: A (as of 2023–24)
- School hours: 7:20 AM to 2:20 PM
- Website: JMMA website

José Martí MAST 6-12 Academy (often shortened as José Martí MAST, JMMA, or JMMA 6-12), is a magnet school incorporating grades 6 through 12 in Hialeah, Florida. Established in 1987 as José Martí Middle School, it expanded into a middle and high school in 2011, re-establishing itself as a magnet school.

== History ==
=== As a middle school (1987–2011) ===
The school was established in 1987 as José Martí Middle School, by José Enriquez Sr., the school's first principal. Eventually, Enriquez's son became the principal of the school.

Prior to its transition to a magnet school, José Martí Middle experienced troubling events such as the intentional setting of a fire in 1999. In November 2010, the school earned over $6,000 by saving energy, which they used to help tutor students.

=== As a magnet school (2011-present) ===
After the superintendent of M-DCPS opened a MAST in Homestead, he decided to "franchise" MAST Academy. Following this, José Martí was converted to a magnet high school in August 2011, with 6th through 9th grades present in the 2011–12 school year.

In November 2011, an incident involving pepper spray being sprayed in a stairwell caused 20 students to go to a hospital for non-life-threatening concerns. That November, the school also became one of three schools—the other two being EA and Hialeah Middle—to be enrolled into the Afterschool Nutrition Program.

In May 2012, the school received a grant from the National Wildlife Federation, which was used to initialize the planting of the school's native arboretum.

In May 2013, the Committee for Economic Development visited MAST.

In 2013–14, the middle and high schools were both fully converted into a magnet school. The school has maintained a relatively small population since this transition, in order to offer its students a richer one-on-one learning experience. In April 2014, The Miami Laker wrote, "the founding class for José Martí MAST Academy contains 50 students scheduled to graduate in 2015." During that school year, the school's Green Club hosted an Earth Day celebration which involved planting trees, mulching grass, and collecting trash. Maintenance of an aquaponics lab also began. The lab and the arboretum are used for research.

The school was selected and featured by the local NBC station's "Brag About Your School" Initiative in 2014. During that school year, a Silver Knight mascot was introduced. The school was also granted an AP Capstone program, set to begin during the 2015–16 school year.

The Green Club at the school has planted and maintained a native arboretum, which includes 38 species of trees, shrubs, and grasses. The Fairchild Challenge is also a component of the school's Green Club. On occasion, QR codes and digital devices have been utilized for research in the arboretum. Fairchild Tropical Botanic Garden also partnered with the school in order to conduct the Million Orchid Project. The project is meant to re-establish the Cyrtopodium punctatum, commonly known as the Florida Cowhorn orchid. In 2017, NBC Miami reported that a botany class continued working on the Million Orchid Project, and wrote, "the kids are learning real science, aided by technology. They use iPads with Google Sheets to keep track of and share data with each other. It's invaluable experience for the students."

== Demographics ==
Jose Marti Mast 6-12 academy has a population of 47% female students and 3% male students. Of these students, 90.9% are Hispanic or Latino. The school hs a 22:1 student to teacher ratio. The school's math and reading proficiency is above an 89%.

== Academics ==
As the MAST (Mathematics and Science Technology) name implies, the school centers its focus around mathematics and science classes, or STEM classes. Martí MAST integrates and combines its middle and high schools into one building. The high school has three academies for its students to choose from: the Life Science Academy, the Physical Science Academy, and Mathematics/Computer Science. The school connects with its students through social media outlets such as Twitter, Edmodo, and teachers' personal websites.

The school collaborates with several organizations, universities, and partners, such as Florida International University, Zoo Miami, and the LARC Technical Institute. As a "No Excuses University" school, visiting Florida International University as part of a joint FIU and McDonald's initiative.

Since the 2001–02 school year, José Martí Middle was consistent in scoring a "C" grade, achieving the grade 8 out of 12 years. It became a "B" school under Lorenzo Ladaga's administration in the 2002–03 school year. It became an "A" school in 2005–06 under Principal Jose Bueno. Since transitioning into MAST Academy, the school has never achieved a school grade lower than an "A".

== Extracurricular activities ==
=== Clubs ===
The school offers a wide range of clubs, including science, mathematics, nature, and art-related clubs. Although not officially listed as a club, the school's aquaponics lab has also been used for research. The effect of tilapia waste on the fertilization of plants has been one research topic in the lab. The following is a full list of the extracurricular clubs offered for students at the school.

=== Athletics ===
In the 2014–15 school year, the school introduced middle school athletics. Among the sports offered are:

- Boys' basketball
- Girls' basketball
- Cross country
- Golf
- Girls' soccer
- Softball
- Swimming
- Tennis
- Track and Field
- Boys' volleyball
- Girls' volleyball

The school does not offer athletics for highschoolers

== Awards and honors ==
In the 2012–13 school year and again in 2013–14, MAST was named a Merit School of Excellence. This award placed Jose Martí MAST in the top 1% of magnet schools in the country.

=== Rankings ===
JMMA has ranked within U.S. News & World Report's top 100 best high schools in the United States list on multiple occasions. USN&WR also gave the school a score of 85.4 on their College Readiness Index.

JMMA ranked 19th out of 2,323 schools in a 2017 Washington Post study of "America's Most Challenging High Schools". Additionally, JMMA was the highest-ranking South Florida school on the list. (Note: This Miami Herald source states that The Washington Post (WP) ranked JMMA 20th on its 2017 "America's Most Challenging High Schools" list, but WP ranked JMMA 19th.)

In 2025 Jose Marti Mast 6-12 academy was ranked 73rd in the nation and 3rd in the Miami Dade School district.

== Notable people associated with Martí MAST ==
- Tombi Bell, physical education teacher, former WNBA player
