= M.A. Milam K–8 Center =

M.A. Milam K-8 Center
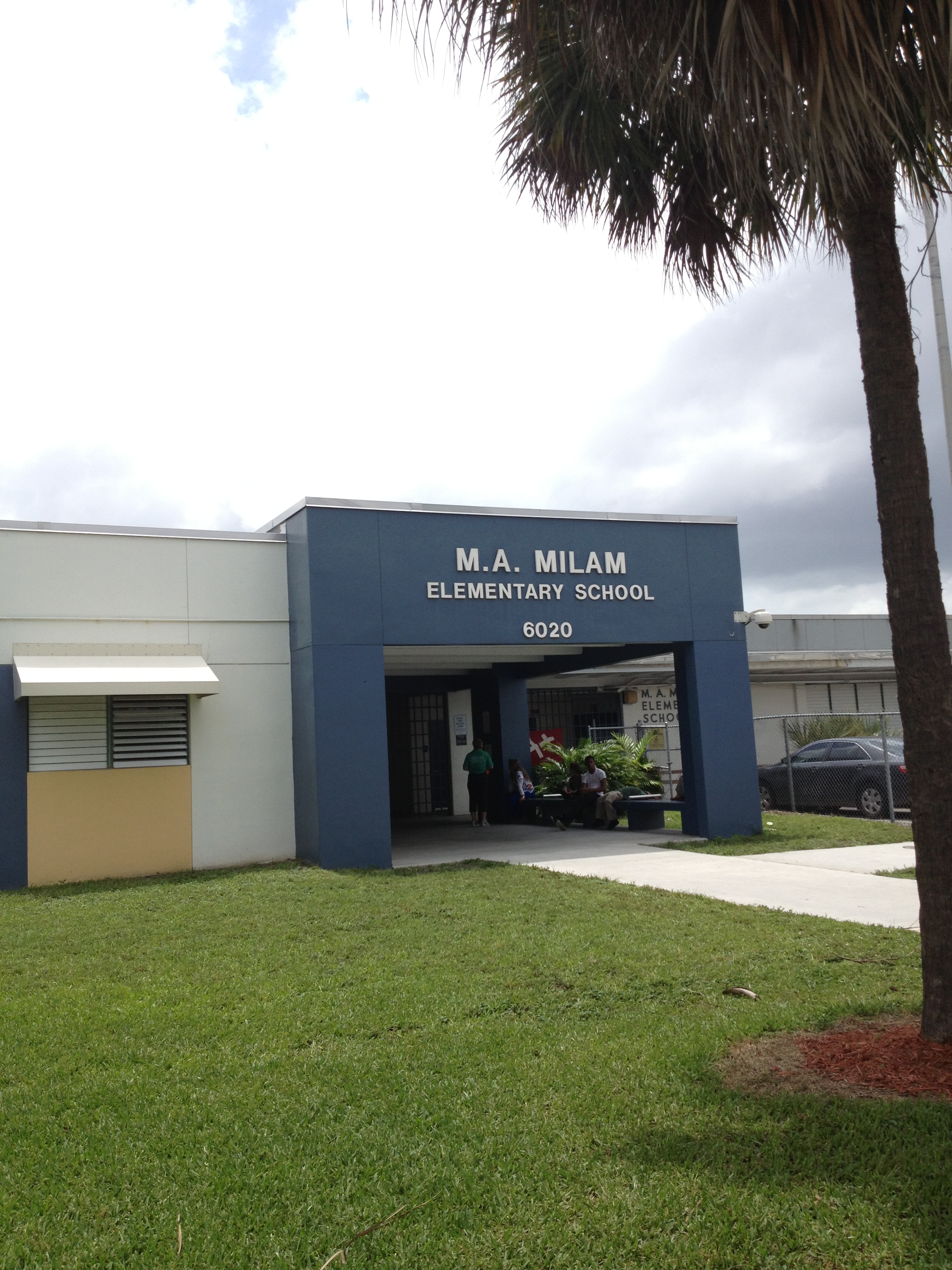

Location
- 6020 W. 16th Avenue; Hialeah, Florida 33012; United States; 25°52′42″N 80°18′58″W

Information
- Type: Public
- Established: September of 1961
- School district: Miami-Dade County Public Schools
- Principal: Mrs. Anna M. Hernandez
- Staff: 60.00 (FTE)
- Grades: K-8
- Enrollment: 1019 (2025-26)
- Student to teacher ratio: 15.75
- Colors: Hunter green, White
- Nickname: Colts
- School Grade: C (2025-2026)
- School Hours: 8:35 AM to 3:05 PM (Mon, Tue, Thu, Fri) 8:35 AM to 1:50 PM (Wed)
- Website: M.A. Milam K–8 Center

Marcus A. Milam K-8 Center, usually referred to as M.A. Milam K–8 Center, or Milam, is an elementary middle school or "K-8 center" in Hialeah, Florida. Established as an elementary school in 1961 to serve the West Hialeah area, the school was expanded to serve as a K-8 school in 1998. It was named after Marcus A. Milam, a dairy pioneer and businessman. The school mascot is the colt. The school colors are white and hunter green, which are incorporated into the mandatory uniform policy.

Anna M. Hernandez assumed the position of principal at the beginning of the 2008–2009 school year, succeeding Dr. Robert G. Valenzuela.

== History ==
In 1961, the school was built on the grounds of the former pasture land used by businessman M.A. Milam, and was established as M.A. Milam Elementary School. In the school's inaugural year, 10 teachers educated 340 students.

The school's conversion from an elementary to a K-8 institution was initiated on December 10, 1997. The Middle Learning Center, often referred to as the MLC, was opened in the 1998–1999 school year, and the first Milam eighth grade class was the Class of 2001.

During the 2001–2002 school year's 4th grading period, the school had 100% attendance.

The MLC was named in honor of former principal, Dr. Valenzuela's semifinal status for Principal of the Year during the 2004–2005 school year.

=== School grades ===
Milam has a consistent record of scoring as an "A" or "B" school in the State FCAT grading system. This consistency began in the 2000–01 school year, when the school grade went from a "D" to an "A".

School year	Grade
1998-99	D
1999-00	D
2000-01	A
2001-02	B
2002-03	A
2003-04	B
2004-05	B
2005-06	A
2006-07	C
2007-08	A
2008-09	A
2009-10	A
2010-11	B
2011-12	A
2012-13	B
2013-14	C
2014-15	C
2015-16	B
2016-17	C
2017-18	B
2018-19	B
2021-22	B
2022-23	B
2023-24	B
2024-25	B
2025-26	C

=== Traditions ===
The school's 8th grade Leadership Circle announces and passes down their position to the new leadership circle on the final day of the school year.

M.A. Milam K–8 Center hosts an annual prom, exclusive to 8th graders.

Every year, the school's administration announces the annual chocolate fundraiser hosted by World's Finest Chocolate. In January 2012, World's Finest Chocolate unveiled their record-setting 12,000 pound chocolate bar at the school to start the 2011-2012 fundraiser.

The school's drama class puts on a winter and end-of-the-year spring show each school year. The school's level two and three drama students are also known as Troupe 88685. The school performs a Cuban Independence "Veinte de Mayo" show in May for the Miami-Dade County School Board. The show is performed to celebrate Cuban culture and history, as many of the students in the school are from Cuba.

== Honors ==
Milam was the "Do The Right Thing" winner, for having the most finalists in the program for all of the Dade Middle Schools, in the 2004–2005 school year. In the years since, Milam students have consistently placed in the top ten winners.

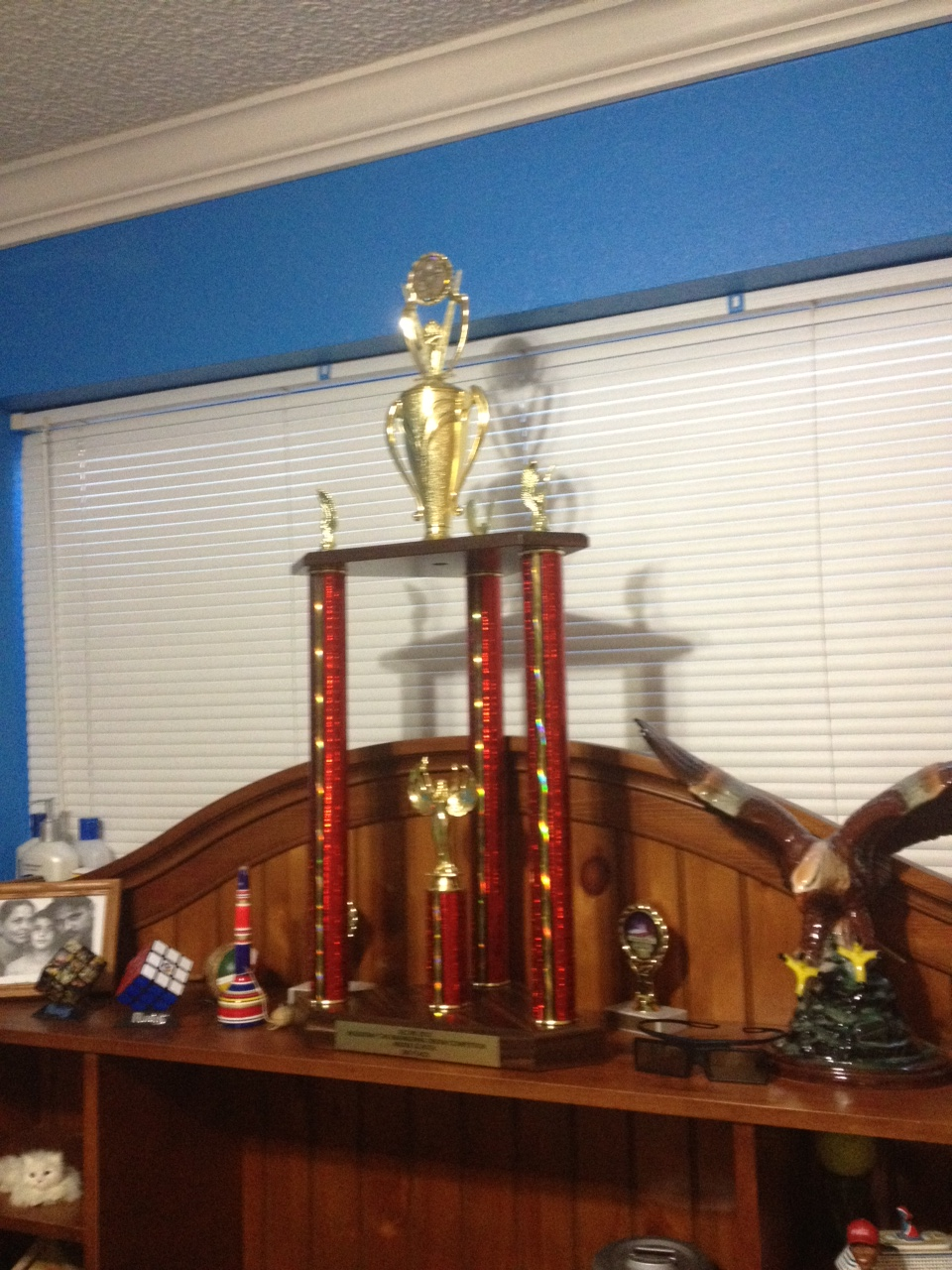
The 2012 SECME National Mousetrap Competition first-place trophy

During the 2004–2005 school year, Milam's principal, Dr. Robert G. Valenzuela, was a finalist for Principal of the Year.

Milam was the district winner for the middle school division of SECME in Miami-Dade County during the 2004–2005 school year. The 2004-2005 Milam Mousetrap team won SECME nationals in North Carolina. The 2010-2011 Milam Mousetrap team was the district winner for the middle and high school division of SECME in regionals, and placed second in nationals. The 2011-2012 Milam Mousetrap team was the district winner for the middle and high school division of SECME in Florida regionals, and placed second in nationals.

In April 2013, the school's Chess Club participated in the largest chess tournament in history, located in Nashville, Tennessee, taking home the seventh-place trophy in the K-9 Unrated Section.

In January 2014, Principal Hernandez was chosen as one of the six best principals in Florida, according to an analysis released by Florida State University and Florida TaxWatch. The analysis recognized the principals from at-risk schools which displayed major learning gains in reading and math.

== Notable people associated with Milam ==
=== Educators ===
- Lizbet Martínez, language arts teacher who became famous in 1994

=== Alumni ===
- Willy Ferrer, politician

== See also ==
- Miami-Dade County Public Schools
- Education in the United States
