= Milam Branch =

Stream in Hickman County, Tennessee, U.S.

Coordinates: 35.741457°N 87.537238°W

Milam Branch is a stream in Hickman County, Tennessee, in the United States. It is a tributary to Beaverdam Creek.

Milam Branch was named for Jordan Milam, a pioneer who settled on the creek in 1819.

== See also ==
- List of rivers of Tennessee
