= Lizbet Martínez =

- Born: Lizbet Martínez; 1981 or 1982 (age 43–44); Cuba
- Education: Florida International University
- Occupation: Elementary English educator
- Known for: playing "The Star-Spangled Banner" after being rescued by the U.S. Coast Guard

Lizbet Martínez is a Cuban violinist and English teacher at M.A. Milam K-8 Center.

During the ""balsero crisis" of 1994, over 30,000 Cubans immigrated to the United States from Cuba on rafts. Seen as a symbol of the balsero exodus, Martínez first became known on August 21, 1994, as a 12-year-old rafter from Cuba. This was when the U.S. Coast Guard picked her and her family out of her raft. The Coast Guard wanted to take her violin because they thought the case might contain a weapon. She then opened the case and started to play "The Star-Spangled Banner" on her violin. She spent five months at the Guantanamo Bay Naval Base before being relocated to Miami.

Martínez attended Florida International University and received a Bachelor of Science degree in music education. At her graduation at Florida International University she played the anthem in front of her fellow graduates to kick off the university's commencement ceremony. Martínez later played on her violin in front of United States Presidents Bill Clinton and George W. Bush. Martínez also performed alongside Gloria Estefan and Jon Secada.

She later became a teacher at Emerson Elementary, before teaching at M.A. Milam K-8 Center. She taught music, until budget cuts took away Milam's music program, leading her to teach English. Martínez has two children. Martínez was also featured in the film Voices from Cuba. After 20 years passed since Martínez emigrated from Cuba, a follow-up article was published about the situation.
