= List of middle schools in Florida =

A middle school is a school for students older than elementary school, but not yet in high school. This is a list of public middle schools in Florida serving grades six through eight and does not include schools of online education and private schools. A list of private schools by county can be found here.

== Alachua County ==
School	Location	Website
Howard Bishop Middle School	Gainesville	http://bishop.sbac.edu/pages/BIS0121
Fort Clarke Middle School	Gainesville	http://www.edline.net/pages/FTC0481
Kanapaha Middle School	Gainesville	http://kanapaha.sbac.edu/pages/KAN0502
Lincoln Middle School	Gainesville	http://lincoln.sbac.edu/pages/LIN0112
Alachua	Gainesville	http://mebane.sbac.edu/pages/MEB0221
Oak View Middle School	Newberry	http://mebane.sbac.edu/pages/MEB0221
Westwood Middle School	Gainesville	http://westwood.sbac.edu/pages/WES0141
Hawthorne High School and Middle School (grades 6-12)	Hawthorne	http://hawthorne.sbac.edu/pages/HAW0201

== Baker County ==
School	Location	Website
Baker County Middle School	Macclenny	http://bcms.baker.k12.fl.us/

== Bay County ==
School	Location	Website
Everitt Middle School	Panama City	http://www.bayschools.com/ems/Home.aspx
Jinks Middle School	Panama City	http://www.bayschools.com/jms/Home.aspx
Merritt Brown Middle School	Panama City	http://www.bayschools.com/bms/Home.aspx
Mowat Middle School	Lynn Haven	http://www.bayschools.com/mms/Home.aspx
Surfside Middle School	Panama City Beach	http://www.bayschools.com/sms/Home.aspx
Deane Bozeman School (unincorporated area)	Panama City	http://www.bayschools.com/dbs/Home.aspx
North Bay Haven Charter Academy	Panama City	
Breakfast Point Academy	Panama City Beach	http://www.bayschools.com/bpa/OurSchool/BreakfastPointAcademy.aspx
Bay Haven Charter Academy	Panama City	http://www.bayhaven.org/

== Bradford County ==
School	Location	Website
Bradford Intervention Center (grades K-12)	Starke	
Bradford Middle School	Starke	
Rainbow Center	Starke	

== Brevard County ==
School	Location	Website
Central Middle School	West Melbourne	http://www.edline.net/pages/Central_Middle/
Clearlake Middle School	Cocoa	https://web.archive.org/web/20160304103555/http://www.clearlake.brevard.k12.fl.us/index.htm
Cocoa Beach High School (grades 7-12)	Cocoa Beach	https://www.c2cschools.com/?site=C67EEFA79CD3448081A5972974E3EA39
DeLaura Middle School	Satellite Beach	http://www.edline.net/pages/DeLaura_Middle_School
Edgewood High School	Merritt Island	http://www.edline.net/pages/Edgewood_JSH/
Hoover Middle School	Indialantic	http://www.edline.net/pages/HooverMS
Jackson Middle School	Titusville	http://www.edline.net/pages/JacksonMS/
Jefferson Middle School	Merritt Island	http://www.edline.net/pages/Jefferson_MiddleSchool
Johnson Middle School	Melbourne	http://www.edline.net/pages/Johnson_MS/
Kennedy Middle School	Rockledge	http://www.edline.net/pages/Kennedy_middle_school
Madison Middle School	Titusville	http://www.edline.net/pages/Madison_MiddleSchool
McNair Middle School	Rockledge	http://www.edline.net/pages/McNair_Middle/
Southwest Middle School	Palm Bay	http://www.edline.net/pages/Southwest__MS/
Space Coast High School	Cocoa	http://www.edline.net/pages/SpaceCoast/
Stone Middle School	Melbourne	http://www.edline.net/pages/StoneMS
West Shore Junior – Senior High School	Melbourne	http://www.edline.net/pages/West_Shore_JSH

== Broward County ==
School	Location	Website
Apollo Middle School	Hollywood	http://apollo.browardschools.com/
Arthur Robert Ashe Jr. Middle School	Fort Lauderdale	http://arthurashe.browardschools.com
Attucks Middle School	Hollywood	http://attucks.browardschools.com
Bair Middle School School	Sunrise	http://bair.browardschools.com/
Coral Springs Middle School	Coral Springs	http://coralspringsmiddle.browardschools.com/
Crystal Lake Middle School	Crystal Lake	http://crystallake.browardschools.com
Deerfield Beach Middle School	Deerfield Beach	http://deerfieldbeachmiddle.org
Driftwood Middle School	Hollywood	http://driftwoodmid.browardschools.com
Falcon Cove Middle School	Weston	http://falconcove.net/
Forest Glen Middle School	Coral Springs	http://forestglen.browardschools.com/
Glades Middle School	Miramar	http://glades.browardschools.com/
Gulfstream Middle School	Hallandale Beach	http://www.gulfstreammiddle.com
Henry D. Perry Middle School	Miramar	http://www.broward.k12.fl.us/perrymiddle/
Indian Ridge Middle School	Davie	http://www.broward.k12.fl.us/indianridgems/
Lauderdale Lakes Middle School	Lauderdale Lakes	http://lauderdalelakes.browardschools.com/
Lauderhill Middle School	Lauderhill	http://lauderhill612.browardschools.com
Lyons Creek Middle School	Coconut Creek	http://www.lyonscreekmiddle.com
Margate Middle School	Margate	http://margate.browardschools.com
McNicol Middle School	Hollywood	http://mcnicolmiddleschool.org
New Renaissance Middle School	Miramar	http://newrenaissance.browardschools.com
New River Middle School	Fort Lauderdale	http://newriver.browardschools.com
Nova Middle School	Davie	http://novamid.browardschools.com
Olsen Middle School	Dania Beach	http://olsen.browardschools.com
Parkway Middle School of the Arts	Lauderhill	http://parkwaymiddlesota.com/
Pines Middle School	Pembroke Pines	http://www.pinesmiddle.com/
Pioneer Middle School	Cooper City	http://pne.browardschools.com/
Plantation Middle School	Plantation	http://plantationmiddle.browardschools.com
Pompano Beach Middle School	Pompano Beach	http://pompanobeachmid.browardschools.com
Ramblewood Middle School	Coral Springs	http://ramblewoodmid.browardschools.com
James S. Rickards Middle School	Oakland Park	http://rickards.browardschools.com
Sawgrass Springs Middle School	Coral Springs	http://www.ssms.org
Seminole Middle School	Plantation	http://www.pcsb.org/seminole-ms
Silver Lakes Middle School	North Lauderdale	http://silverlakes.browardschools.com
Silver Trail Middle School	Fort Lauderdale	http://silvertrail.browardschools.com
Sunrise Middle School	Fort Lauderdale	http://sunrise.browardschools.com
Tequesta Trace Middle School	Weston	http://tequestatrace.browardschools.com
Walter C. Young Middle School	Pembroke Pines	http://waltercyoung.browardschools.com
Westglades Middle School	Parkland	http://www.westgladesmiddle.com/
Westpine Middle School	Sunrise	http://westpine.browardschools.com
William Dandy Middle School	Fort Lauderdale	http://williamdandy.browardschools.com

== Calhoun County ==
School	Location	Website
Altha Public School	Altha	http://www.althaschool.org/
Blountstown Middle School	Blountstown	http://www.blountstownmiddle.org/
Carr Elementary & Middle School	Clarksville	http://www.carrschool.org/

== Charlotte County ==
School	Location	Website
A. Ainger Middle School	Rotonda West	http://www.edline.net/pages/L_A__Ainger_Middle_School
Murdock Middle School	Port Charlotte	http://www.edline.net/pages/Murdock_Middle_School
Community Christian School	Port Charlotte	http://www.ccacougars.net/
Port Charlotte Middle School	Port Charlotte	http://portcharlottemiddle.net/
Punta Gorda Middle School	Punta Gorda	http://www.edline.net/pages/Punta_Gorda_Middle_School

== Citrus County ==
School	Location	Website
Citrus Springs Middle School	Citrus Springs	http://www.citrus.k12.fl.us/csm/
Crystal River Middle School	Crystal River	https://web.archive.org/web/20110401043754/http://www.citrus.k12.fl.us/crm/
Inverness Middle School	Inverness	http://ims.citrusschools.org/
Lecanto Middle School	Lecanto	http://lms.citrusschools.org/

== Clay County ==
Clay County has Junior High Schools listed here.

== Collier County ==
School	Location	Website
Oaklead Junior High School	Orange Park	https://web.archive.org/web/20100603230703/http://www.clay.k12.fl.us/ols/
Corkscrew Middle School	Naples	http://www.collierschools.com/cms
Cypress Palm Middle School	Naples	http://www.collierschools.com/cpm
East Naples Middle School	Naples	http://www.collierschools.com/enm
Everglades City Middle School	Ochopee	http://www.collierschools.com/evg
Golden Gate Middle School	Naples	http://www.collierschools.com/ggm
Gulfview Middle School	Naples	http://www.collierschools.com/gvm
Immokalee Middle School	Immokalee	http://www.collierschools.com/ims
Manatee Middle School	Naples	http://www.collierschools.net/Domain/41
North Naples Middle	Naples	http://www.collierschools.com/nnm/
Oakridge Middle	Naples	http://www.collierschools.net/Domain/46
Pine Ridge Middle	Naples	http://www.collierschools.com/prm

== Columbia County ==
School	Location	Website
Fort White Middle-High School	Fort White	https://web.archive.org/web/20150801174202/http://fortwhitehighschool.org/
Lake City Middle School	Lake City	https://web.archive.org/web/20150821022337/http://www.columbia.k12.fl.us/lakecitymiddle/
Richardson Middle School	Lake City	https://web.archive.org/web/20101206073338/http://columbia.k12.fl.us/richardson/

== DeSoto County ==
School	Location	Website
Desoto County Middle School	Arcadia	http://dms.desotoschools.com/

== Dixie County ==
School	Location	Website
Ruth Rains Middle School	Cross City	

== Duval County ==
School	Location	Website
Alred L. Dupoint Middle School	Jacksonville	http://www.duvalschools.org/dupont
Arlington Middle School	Jacksonville	https://web.archive.org/web/20150704014720/http://arlingtonms.acsk-12.org/School_Website/Home.html
Baldwin Middle-High School	Baldwin	http://dcps.duvalschools.org/bmsh
Darnell-Cookman School of the Medical Arts	Jacksonville	http://dcps.duvalschools.org/darnellcookman
Duval Academy	Jacksonville	http://dcps.duvalschools.org/youthdev
Fletcher Middle School	Jacksonville	http://www.duvalschools.org/fms
Fletcher Middle School	Neptune Beach	http://dcps.duvalschools.org/fms
Fort Caroline Middle School	Jacksonville	http://dcps.duvalschools.org/fcm
Highlands Middle School	Jacksonville	http://www.duvalschools.org/HMS
Jefferson Davis Middle School	Jacksonville	http://www.duvalschools.org/jeffdavis
John E. Ford Pre K-8th School	Jacksonville	http://www.duvalschools.org/johneford
Kernan Middle School	Jacksonville	http://www.duvalschools.org/kms
Kirby-Smith Middle School	Jacksonville	http://www.duvalschools.org/kirbysmith
Lake Shores Middle School	Jacksonville	http://www.duvalschools.org/lakeshore
Landmark Middle School	Jacksonville	http://www.duvalschools.org/landmark
Landon Middle School	Jacksonville	http://www.duvalschools.org/landmark
LaVilla School of the Arts	Jacksonville	http://www.duvalschools.org/lavilla
Mandarin Middle School	Jacksonville	http://www.duvalschools.org/mandarin
Matthew W. Gilbert Middle School	Jacksonville	http://www.duvalschools.org/matthewgilbert
Mayport Middle School	Atlantic Beach	http://www.duvalschools.org/mayportmiddle
Northwestern Middle School	Jacksonville	http://www.duvalschools.org/northwestern
Oceanway Middle School	Jacksonville	http://www.duvalschools.org/oceanwayschool
Jean Ribault Middle School	Jacksonville	http://www.duvalschools.org/rms
Southside Middle School	Jacksonville	http://www.duvalschools.org/southside
Joseph Stilwell Middle School	Jacksonville	http://www.duvalschools.org/stilwell
JEB Stuart Middle School	Jacksonville	http://www.duvalschools.org/stuart
Twin Lakes Middle School	Jacksonville	http://www.duvalschools.org/tlam
Westview K-8th School	Jacksonville	http://www.duvalschools.org/westview
Young Women's Leadership Academy	Jacksonville	http://www.duvalschools.org/ywla

== Escambia County ==
School	Location	Website
Bellview Middle School	Pensacola	http://bms-ecsd-fl.schoolloop.com/
Brown-Barge Middle School	Pensacola	http://www.escambiaschools.org/
Ernest Ward Middle School	Walnut Hill	http://ewms-ecsd-fl.schoolloop.com/
Ferry Pass Middle School	Pensacola	http://fpms-ecsd-fl.schoolloop.com/
Jim C. Bailey Middle School	Pensacola	http://jbms-ecsd-fl.schoolloop.com/
Ransom Middle School	Cantonment	http://rms-ecsd-fl.schoolloop.com/
Warrington Middle School	Pensacola	http://wms-ecsd-fl.schoolloop.com/
Woodham Middle School	Pensacola	http://woodham-ecsd-fl.schoolloop.com/
Workman Middle School	Pensacola	http://jhwms-ecsd-fl.schoolloop.com/

== Flagler County ==
School	Location	Website
Buddy Taylor Middle School	Palm Coast	http://btmseagles.com
Indian Trails Middle School (Palm Coast)	Palm Coast	http://www.indiantrails.scps.k12.fl.us

== Franklin County ==
School	Location	Website
Franklin County K-12 School		https://web.archive.org/web/20140328194541/http://www.franklincountyschools.org/FranklinCountySchool.aspx
Apalachicola Bay Charter School		http://www.abceagles.org/

== Gadsden County ==
School	Location	Website
Carter-Parramore Academy	Quicy	http://www.cpa.gcps.k12.fl.us/
Crossroad Academy Charter School	Quincy	http://www.crossroad.gcps.k12.fl.us/
Havana Middle School	Havana	http://www.hms.gcps.k12.fl.us/
James A. Shanks Middle School	Quincy	http://www.jasms.gcps.k12.fl.us/

== Gilchrist County ==
School	Location	Website
Bell Middle/High School	Bell	http://bhs.gilchristschools.schoolfusion.us/
Trenton Middle/High School	Trenton	http://ths.gilchristschools.schoolfusion.us/

== Glades County ==
School	Location	Website
Moore Haven High School	Moore Haven	http://mhhs.gladesedu.com/
West Glades School	LaBelle	http://wgs.gladesedu.com/

== Gulf County ==
School	Location	Website
Port St. Joe High School	Port St. Joe	http://psjhs-gcs-fl.schoolloop.com/
Wewahitchka High School	Wewahitchka	https://whs-gcs-fl.schoolloop.com/

== Hamilton County ==
School	Location	Website
Hamilton County High School	South Jasper	http://hch.hamiltonfl.com/

== Hardee County ==
School	Location	Website
Hardee County Pioneer Career Academy	Zolfo Springs	http://www.hardee.k12.fl.us/pca/
Hardee Junior High School	Wauchula	http://www.hardee.k12.fl.us/hjh/

== Hendry County ==
School	Location	Website
LaBelle Middle School	LaBelle	http://www.hendry-schools.org/domain/9
Clewiston Middle School	Clewiston	http://www.hendry-schools.org/domain/14

== Hernando County ==
School	Location	Website
D.S. Parrott Middle School	Brooksville	http://www.edline.net/pages/HCSB_DSPMS
Fox Chapel Middle School	Spring Hill	http://www.edline.net/pages/HCSB_FCMS
Powell Middle School	Brooksville	http://www.edline.net/pages/HCSB_PMS
West Hernando Middle School	Brooksville	http://www.edline.net/pages/HCSB_WHMS

== Highlands County ==
School	Location	Website
Avon Park Middle School	Avon Park	http://highmail.highlands.k12.fl.us/~apm/
Hill-Gustat Middle School	Sebring	http://highmail.highlands.k12.fl.us/~hgm/
Lake Placid Middle School	Lake Placid	http://highmail.highlands.k12.fl.us/~lpm/
Sebring Middle School	Sebring	http://highmail.highlands.k12.fl.us/~sms/

== Hillsborough County ==
School	Location	Website
Barrington Middle School	Riverview	http://barrington.mysdhc.org/
Benito Middle School	Tampa	http://benito.mysdhc.org
Buchanan Middle School	Tampa	http://buchanan.mysdhc.org
Burnett Middle School	Seffner	http://burnett.mysdhc.org
Burns Middle School	Brandon	http://burns.mysdhc.org
Coleman Middle School	Tampa	http://coleman.mysdhc.org
Davidsen Middle School	Tampa	http://davidsen.mysdhc.org
Dowdell Middle School	Tampa	http://dowdell.mysdhc.org
Eisenhower Middle School	Gibsonton	http://eisenhower.mysdhc.org
Farnell Middle School	Tampa	http://farnell.mysdhc.org
Ferrell Girls Preparatory Academy	Tampa	http://ferrell.mysdhc.org
Franklin Boys Preparatory Academy	Tampa	http://franklin.mysdhc.org
Giunta Middle School	Riverview	http://giunta.mysdhc.org
Greco Middle School	Temple Terrace	http://greco.mysdhc.org
Hill Middle School	Tampa	http://hill.mysdhc.org/
Jennings Middle School	Tampa	http://jennings.mysdhc.org
Liberty Middle School	Tampa	http://liberty.mysdhc.org
Madison Middle School	Tampa	http://madison.mysdhc.org
Mann Middle School	Brandon	http://mann.mysdhc.org
Marshall Middle School (Plant City, Florida)	Plant City	http://marshall.mysdhc.org/
Martinez Middle School	Lutz	http://martinez.mysdhc.org
Memorial Middle School	Tampa	http://memorial.mysdhc.org/
Mulrennan Middle School	Valrico	http://mulrennan.mysdhc.org
Orange Grove Middle School	Tampa	http://orangegrove.mysdhc.org
Pierce Middle School	Tampa	http://pierce.mysdhc.org
Progress Village Middle School	Tampa	http://progressvillage.mysdhc.org
Rampello Middle School	Tampa	http://rampello.mysdhc.org
Randall Middle School	Lithia	http://randall.mysdhc.org
Rodgers Middle School	Riverview	http://rodgers.mysdhc.org
Roland Park Middle School	Tampa	http://rolandpark.mysdhc.org
Shields Middle School	Ruskin	http://shields.mysdhc.org
Sligh Middle School	Tampa	https://sligh.mysdhc.org
Smith Middle School	Tampa	http://smith.mysdhc.org
Tinker Middle School	Tampa	http://www.sdhc.k12.fl.us
Tomlin Middle School	Plant City	http://tomlin.mysdhc.org
Turkey Creek Middle School	Plant City	http://turkeycreek.mysdhc.org
Turner/Bartels K-8 School	Tampa	https://web.archive.org/web/20150430035822/http://bartels.mysdhc.org/
Van Buren Middle School	Tampa	http://vanburen.mysdhc.org
Walker Middle School	Odessa	http://walker.mysdhc.org
Webb Middle School	Tampa	http://webb.mysdhc.org
Williams Middle School	Tampa	http://williams.mysdhc.org
Wilson Middle School	Tampa	http://wilsonms.mysdhc.org
Young Middle School	Tampa	http://young.mysdhc.org

== Holmes County ==
School	Location	Website
Bethlehem School	Bonifay	http://bhs.hdsb.org/
Bonifay Middle School	Bonifay	http://bms.hdsb.org/
Poplar Springs School	Graceville	http://pshs.hdsb.org

== Indian River County ==
School	Location	Website
Gifford Middle School	Vero Beach	https://gms.indianriverschools.org/
Oslo Middle School	Vero Beach	https://oms.indianriverschools.org/
Sebastian River Middle School	Sebastian	https://srms.indianriverschools.org/
Storm Grove Middle School	Vero Beach	https://sgms.indianriverschools.org/

== Jackson County ==
School	Location	Website
Grand Ridge School	Grand Ridge	http://grs.jcsb.org
Hope School	Marianna	http://hope.jcsb.org/
Malone School	Malone	http://malone.jcsb.org
Marianna Middle School	Marianna	http://mms.jcsb.org

== Jefferson County ==
School	Location	Website
Jefferson County Middle/High School	Monticello	http://www.jeffersonschooldistrict.org/1/Home

== Lafayette County ==
School	Location	Website
Lafayette Middle/High School	Mayo	http://lhs.lafayette.schooldesk.net/

== Lake County ==
School	Location	Website
Carver Middle School	Leesburg	http://www.lake.k12.fl.us/site/Default.aspx?PageID=9129
Clermont Middle School	Clermont	http://www.lake.k12.fl.us/site/Default.aspx?PageID=9632
East Ridge Middle School	Clermont	http://www.lake.k12.fl.us/site/Default.aspx?PageID=18906
Eustis Middle School	Eustis	http://www.lake.k12.fl.us/site/Default.aspx?PageID=10109
Cecil E. Gray Middle School	Groveland	http://www.lake.k12.fl.us/site/Default.aspx?PageID=10357
Mount Dora Middle School	Mount Dora	http://www.lake.k12.fl.us/site/Default.aspx?PageID=10664
Oak Park Middle School	Leesburg	http://www.lake.k12.fl.us/site/Default.aspx?PageID=10882
Tavaras Middle School	Tavares	http://www.lake.k12.fl.us/site/Default.aspx?PageID=11325
Umatilla Middle School	Umatilla	http://www.lake.k12.fl.us/site/Default.aspx?PageID=11701
Windy Hill Middle School	Clermont	http://www.lake.k12.fl.us/site/Default.aspx?PageID=12048

== Lee County ==
School	Location	Website
Bonita Springs Middle Center for the Arts	Bonita Springs	http://bnm.leeschools.net/
Caloosa Middle School	Cape Coral	http://com.leeschools.net/
Challenger Middle School	Cape Coral	http://chm.leeschools.net/
Cypress Lake Middle School	Fort Myers	http://cym.leeschools.net/
Diplomat Middle School	Cape Coral	http://dpm.leeschools.net/
Fort Myers Middle Academy	Fort Myers	http://fmm.leeschools.net/
Gulf Middle School	Cape Coral	http://gfm.leeschools.net/
Harns Marsh Middle School	Lehigh Acres	http://hmm.leeschools.net/
James Stephens International Academy	Fort Myers	http://jsa.leeschools.net/
Lehigh Acres Middle School	Lehigh Acres	http://lhm.leeschools.net/
Lexington Middle School	Fort Myers	http://lxm.leeschools.net/
Mariner Middle School	Cape Coral	http://mrm.leeschools.net/
North Fort Myers Academy for the Arts	Fort Myers	http://nfa.leeschools.net/
Oak Hammock Middle School	Fort Myers	http://ohm.leeschools.net/
Paul Laurence Dunbar Middle School	Fort Myers	http://dun.leeschools.net/
The Alva School	Alva	http://alv.leeschools.net/
The Sanibel School	Sanibel	http://sbl.leeschools.net/
Three Oaks Middle School	Fort Myers	http://okm.leeschools.net/
Trafalgar Middle School	Cape Coral	http://tfm.leeschools.net/
Varsity Lakes Middle School	Lehigh Acres	http://vlm.leeschools.net/
Veterans Park Academy for the Arts	Lehigh Acres	http://vpa.leeschools.net/

== Leon County ==
School	Location	Website
Cobb Middle School	Tallahassee	https://web.archive.org/web/20160304105833/http://www.cobb.leon.k12.fl.us/default.aspx
Deerlake Middle School	Tallahassee	http://www.leonschools.net/deerlake
Fairview Middle School	Tallahassee	http://www.leonschools.net/fairview
Ft. Braden Middle School	Tallahassee	http://www.leonschools.net/ftbraden
Griffin Middle School	Tallahassee	https://web.archive.org/web/20150924150153/http://www.griffin.leon.k12.fl.us/default.aspx
Montford Middle School	Tallahassee	http://www.leonschools.net/montford
Nims Middle School	Tallahassee	http://www.leonschools.net/nims
Raa Middle School	Tallahassee	http://www.leonschools.net/raa
Swift Creek Middle School	Tallahassee	http://www.leonschools.net/swiftcreek
Woodville Middle School	Tallahassee	http://www.leonschools.net/swiftcreek

== Levy County ==
School	Location	Website
Bronson Middle/High School	Bronson	http://bronsonmiddlehigh.levyschools.org/r/
Levy Learning Academy	Bronson	
Cedar Key School	Cedar Key	http://cedarkey.levyschools.org/r/
Chiefland Middle High School	Chiefland	
Williston Middle School	Williston	https://web.archive.org/web/20151009093124/http://wms.levyschools.org/r/
Yankeetown School	Yankeetown	http://yankeetown.levyschools.org/r/
Whispering Winds Charter School	Chiefland	http://www.whisperingwindscharter.com/
Nature Coast Middle School	Chiefland	http://naturecoastmiddle.com/

== Liberty County ==
School	Location	Website
Hosford Elementary and Junior High School	Hosford	http://hsfd.lcsbonline.org/
W. R. Tolar K-8 School	Bristol	http://wrt.lcsbonline.org/

== Madison County ==
School	Location	Website
Madison County Central School	Madison	http://mccs.madison.k12.fl.us/

== Manatee County ==
School	Location	Website
Horizons Academy	Bradenton	http://www.manatee.k12.fl.us/sites/horizons
Manatee School for the Arts	Palmetto	http://www.msfta.org

== Marion County ==
School	Location	Website
Belleview Middle School	Belleview	http://www.marion.k12.fl.us/schools/bms/
Dunnellon Middle School	Dunnellon	http://www.marion.k12.fl.us/schools/dms
Ft. McCoy Middle School	Fort McCoy	http://www.marion.k12.fl.us/schools/fms
Fort King Middle School	Ocala	http://www.marion.k12.fl.us/schools/fkm
Horizon Academy At Marion Oaks	Ocala	http://www.marion.k12.fl.us/schools/HAM
Howard Middle School	Ocala	http://www.marion.k12.fl.us/schools/hms
Lake Weir Middle School	Summerfield	http://www.marion.k12.fl.us/schools/lwm
Liberty Middle School	Ocala	http://www.liberty.ocps.net
North Marion Middle School	Citra	http://www.marion.k12.fl.us/schools/nms
Osceola Middle School	Ocala	http://www.marion.k12.fl.us/schools/oms/
Marion Charter School	Ocala	http://www.edline.net/pages/Marion_Charter_School

== Martin County ==
School	Location	Website
Dr. David L. Anderson Middle School	Stuart	http://www.martinschools.org/pages/dlams
Hidden Oaks Middle School	Palm City	http://www.martinschools.org/pages/homs
Indiantown Middle School	Indiantown	http://www.martinschools.org/pages/ims
Murray Middle School	Stuart	http://www.martinschools.org/pages/Murray
Stuart Middle School	Stuart	http://sms.martinschools.org/pages/Stuart_Middle_School

== Miami-Dade County ==
School	Location	Website
Andover Middle School	Miami Gardens	http://andover.dadeschools.net/Andover/index.html
Arvida Middle School	Miami, Florida	http://arvidamiddle.org
Brownsville Middle School	Miami	http://brownsville.dadeschools.net
Carol City Middle School	Miami Gardens	http://carolcitymiddle.dadeschools.net
Citrus Grove Middle School	Miami	http://citrusgrovems.org/
Country Club Middle School	Miami	
Cutler Bay Middle School	Cutler Bay	http://www.crmschool.org
George Washington Carver Middle School	Coral Gables	http://gwcm.dadeschools.net
Georgia Jones-Ayers Middle School	Miami	https://web.archive.org/web/20150502185247/http://ams.dadeschools.net/pages/sidebar-right.html
Glades Middle School	Miami	https://web.archive.org/web/20150921185901/http://www.gladesgators.org/
Hammocks Middle School	Miami	http://hammocksmiddleschool.org
Henry H. Filer Middle School	Hialeah	http://filer.dadeschools.net
Herbert A. Ammons Middle School	Miami	http://ammons.dadeschools.net
Hialeah Gardens Middle School	Hialeah Gardens	http://hialeahgardensmiddle.org/
Hialeah Middle School	Hialeah	http://hms.dadeschools.net
Highland Oaks Middle School	Miami	http://hom.dadeschools.net
Homestead Middle School	Homestead	http://homesteadmiddle.org
Horace Mann Middle School	Miami	http://www.horacemanntrojans.com
Howard D. McMillan Middle School	Miami	http://hdmcmillan.dadeschools.net
John F. Kennedy Middle School	Miami	http://jfk.dadeschools.net
Jorge Mas Canosa Middle School	Miami	http://jmcmiddle.dadeschools.net
Jose De Diego Middle School	Miami	https://web.archive.org/web/20170926011315/http://jdiegoms.org/
Kinloch Park Middle School	Miami	http://www.kpmschool.com
Lake Stevens Middle School	Miami	http://lsms.dadeschools.net
Lamar Louise Curry Middle School	Miami	http://curry.dadeschools.net
Lawton Chiles Middle School	Miami	http://lawtonchilesmiddle.com
Madison Middle School	Miami	http://www.madisonmiddle.net/
Miami Lakes Middle School	Miami Lakes	http://mlms.dadeschools.net/
Miami Springs Middle School	Miami Springs	http://msms.dadeschools.net/
Nautilus Middle School	Miami Beach	http://nautilus.dadeschools.net/
Norland Middle School	Miami Gardens	http://nms.dadeschools.net/
North Dade Middle School	Miami Gardens	http://www.dadeschools.net/
North Miami Middle School	North Miami	http://nmiamid.dadeschools.net/
Palm Springs Middle School	Hialeah	http://palmspringsmiddleschool.net/
Palmetto Middle School	Pinecrest	http://palmettomiddleschool.org/
Paul W. Bell Middle School	Miami	http://pwbell.dadeschools.net/
Ponce De Leon Middle School	Coral Gables	http://ponce.dadeschools.net/
Redland Middle School	Miami	http://redlandmiddle.dadeschools.net/
Richmond Heights Middle School	Miami	http://richmondheightsmiddle.org/
Riviera Middle School	Miami	http://rivieramiddle.net/
Rockway Middle School	Miami	http://www.rockwaymiddleschool.org
Ruben Dario Middle School	Miami	http://rubendarioms.org
Shenandoah Middle School	Miami	
South Dade Middle School	Miami	http://sdm.dadeschools.net
South Miami Middle School	South Miami	http://southmiamimiddle.org/
Southwood Middle School	Palmetto Bay	http://www.southwoodmiddleschool.org
Thomas Jefferson Middle School	Miami	http://jefferson.dadeschools.net/
W.R. Thomas Middle School	Miami	http://wrthomas.dadeschools.net
West Miami Middle School	Miami	http://westmiamimiddle.org/
Westview Middle School	Miami	http://westviewmiddle.dadeschools.net/

== Monroe County ==
School	Location	Website
Big Pine Academy	Big Pine Key	http://www.bigpineacademy.com/
Horace O'Bryant Middle School	Key West	https://web.archive.org/web/20150822052400/http://hob.keysschools.com/
Key Largo School	Key Largo	http://kls.keysschools.com
Key West Montessori Charter School		http://keywestmontessori.com/?sessionid=4f4aaf8154df44fb170e0516dc67a549&t
Marathon Middle/High School	Marathon	https://web.archive.org/web/20160724114026/http://mhs.keysschools.com/
Plantation Key School	Tavernier	http://pks.keysschools.com
Sigsbee Charter School	Key West	http://www.sigsbee.org
Sugarload School	Key West	http://sls.keysschools.com/
Treasure Village Montessori Charter School	Islamorada	http://treasurevillagemontessori.com

== Nassau County ==
School	Location	Website
Callahan Middle School	Callahan	http://www.edline.net/pages/Callahan_Middle_School
Fernandina Beach Middle School	Fernandina Beach	http://www.edline.net/pages/Fernandina_Beach_Middle_School
Hilliard Middle-Senior High School	Hilliard	http://www.edline.net/pages/Hilliard_Middle-Senior_High
Yulee Middle School	Yulee	http://www.edline.net/pages/Yulee_Middle_School

== Okaloosa County ==
School	Location	Website
Baker School	Baker	http://www.okaloosaschools.com/baker/
Bruner Middle School	Fort Walton Beach	http://www.brunerspartans.com
Davidson Middle School	Crestview	http://www.okaloosaschools.com/davidson
Destin Middle School	Destin	https://web.archive.org/web/20150810085930/http://www.okaloosa.k12.fl.us/destinm/
Laurel Hill School	Laurel Hill	http://www.okaloosaschools.com/laurelhill
Lewis School	Valparaiso	http://www.okaloosaschools.com/lewis
Meigs Middle School	Shalimar	http://www.meigsmiddleschool.com
Northwest Florida Ballet Academie	Fort Walton Beach	http://www.nfballet.org
Okaloosa STEMM Center	Valparasio	http://www.okaloosaschools.com/STEMM
Pryor Middle School	Fort Walton Beach	http://www.okaloosa.k12.fl.us/pryor/
Richbourg School	Crestview	http://www.okaloosaschools.com/richbourg/
Ruckel Middle School	Niceville	http://www.okaloosa.k12.fl.us/ruckel/
Shoal River Middle School	Crestview	http://www.okaloosaschools.com/shoalriver
Silver Sands School	Fort Walton Beach	http://www.okaloosaschools.com/silversands/

== Okeechobee County ==
School	Location	Website
Okeechobee Achievement Academy	Okeechobee	http://okeechobeeachievementacademy.sites.thedigitalbell.com/
Osceola Middle School	Okeechobee	http://osceolamiddleschool.sites.thedigitalbell.com/
Yearling Middle School	Okeechobee	http://www.edline.net/pages/yearlingmiddle

== Orange County ==
School	Location	Website
Apopka Middle School	Apopka	http://www.amms.ocps.net/
Avalon Middle School	Orlando	https://web.archive.org/web/20150927034021/https://www.ocps.net/lc/east/mav/Pages/default.aspx
Bridgewater Middle School	Winter Garden	https://web.archive.org/web/20160304202009/https://www.ocps.net/lc/west/mbr/Pages/default.aspx
Carver Middle School	Orlando	https://web.archive.org/web/20150926192049/https://www.ocps.net/lc/west/mca/Pages/default.aspx
Chain of Lakes Middle School	Orlando	https://web.archive.org/web/20150924181537/https://www.ocps.net/lc/southwest/mch/Pages/default.aspx
Conway Middle School	Orlando	http://www.cms.ocps.net
Coner Lake Middle School	Orlando	https://web.archive.org/web/20150411034827/https://www.ocps.net/lc/east/mcl/Pages/default.aspx
Discovery Middle School (Orlando)	Orlando	https://web.archive.org/web/20150926030329/https://www.ocps.net/lc/east/mds/Pages/default.aspx
Freedom Middle School	Orlando	https://web.archive.org/web/20160611012435/https://www.ocps.net/LC/SOUTHWEST/MFR/Pages/default.aspx
Glenridge Middle School	Orlando	http://www.glenridge.ocps.net
Gotha Middle School	Windermere	http://www.gotha.ocps.net
Howard Middle School	Orlando	https://web.archive.org/web/20150927034030/https://www.ocps.net/lc/southwest/mho/Pages/default.aspx
Hunters Creek Middle School	Orlando	https://web.archive.org/web/20150928171511/https://www.ocps.net/lc/Southwest/mhc/Pages/default.aspx
Judson B Walker Middle School	Orlando	https://web.archive.org/web/20150411061845/https://www.ocps.net/lc/Southeast/mwa/Pages/default.aspx
Jackson Middle School	Orlando	http://www.stonewalljackson.ocps.net
Lake Nona Middle School	Orlando	https://web.archive.org/web/20151220204702/https://www.ocps.net/lc/southeast/mln/Pages/default.aspx
Lakeview Middle School	Winter Garden	https://web.archive.org/web/20150412034102/https://www.ocps.net/lc/west/mla/Pages/default.aspx
Lee Middle School	Orlando	https://web.archive.org/web/20081015062419/http://www.lee.ocps.net/
Legacy Middle School	Orlando	https://web.archive.org/web/20150927031051/https://www.ocps.net/lc/east/mlg/Pages/default.aspx
Liberty Middle School	Orlando	http://www.liberty.ocps.net
Lockhart Middle School	Orlando	https://web.archive.org/web/20150224064534/https://www.ocps.net/lc/north/mlo/Pages/default.aspx
Maitland Middle School	Maitland	http://www.mm.ocps.net
Meadow Woods Middle School	Orlando	https://web.archive.org/web/20160304201701/https://www.ocps.net/lc/southeast/mmw/Pages/default.aspx
Meadow Brook Middle School	Orlando	https://web.archive.org/web/20160304202104/https://www.ocps.net/lc/north/mme/Pages/default.aspx
Memorial Middle School	Orlando	https://web.archive.org/web/20150531010925/https://www.ocps.net/lc/southwest/mmm/Pages/default.aspx
Ocoee Middle School	Ocoee	https://web.archive.org/web/20140712105042/https://www.ocps.net/lc/west/moo/Pages/Default.aspx
Odyssey Middle School	Orlando	https://web.archive.org/web/20150925182435/https://www.ocps.net/lc/southeast/mod/Pages/Default.aspx
Piedmont Lakes Middle School	Apopka	https://web.archive.org/web/20160304212643/https://www.ocps.net/lc/north/mpd/Pages/default.aspx
Robert E Lee Middle School	Orlando	https://web.archive.org/web/20150812201949/https://www.ocps.net/lc/north/mle/Pages/default.aspx
Robinswood Middle School	Orlando	https://web.archive.org/web/20150531011324/https://www.ocps.net/lc/west/mro/Pages/default.aspx
South Creek Middle School	Orlando	https://web.archive.org/web/20170322094940/https://www.ocps.net/lc/Southeast/msc/Pages/default.aspx
Southwest Middle School	Orlando	http://www.swms.ocps.net
StoneWall Jackson Middle School	Orlando	http://www.stonewalljackson.ocps.net
Union Park Middle School	Orlando	https://web.archive.org/web/20150412033418/https://www.ocps.net/lc/east/mup/Pages/default.aspx
Westridge Middle School	Orlando	https://web.archive.org/web/20150926032753/https://www.ocps.net/lc/southwest/mwe/Pages/default.aspx
Wolf Lake Middle School	Apopka	https://web.archive.org/web/20160304201201/https://www.ocps.net/lc/north/mwl/Pages/default.aspx

== Osceola County ==
School	Location	Website
Denn John Middle School	Kissimmee	http://djms.osceola.k12.fl.us/SitePages/Home.aspx
Discovery Intermediate School	Kissimmee	https://web.archive.org/web/20150622075326/http://www.dis.osceola.k12.fl.us/
Horizon Middle School	Kissimmee	https://web.archive.org/web/20150731000824/http://www.hzms.osceola.k12.fl.us/SitePages/Home.aspx
Kissimmee Middle School	Kissimmee	https://web.archive.org/web/20150826085920/http://www.kms.osceola.k12.fl.us/
Narcoossee Middle School	St. Cloud	https://web.archive.org/web/20150823041433/http://www.ncms.osceola.k12.fl.us/
Neptune Middle School	Kissimmee	https://web.archive.org/web/20150822100835/http://www.nms.osceola.k12.fl.us/
Parkway Middle School	Kissimmee	http://pwms.osceola.k12.fl.us/SitePages/Home.aspx
St. Cloud Middle School	Kissimmee	https://web.archive.org/web/20150922234753/http://www.scms.osceola.k12.fl.us/

== Palm Beach County ==
School	Location	Website
Bak Middle School of the Arts School	West Palm Beach	http://www.edline.net/pages/Middle_School_of_the_Arts
Bear Lakes Middle School	West Palm Beach	http://www.edline.net/pages/Bear_Lakes_Middle_School
Boca Raton Community Middle School	Boca Raton	http://www.edline.net/pages/Boca_Raton_Middle_School
Carver Community Middle School	Delray Beach	http://www.edline.net/pages/Carver_Middle_School
Christa McAuliffe Middle School	Boynton Beach	http://www.edline.net/pages/Christa_McAuliffe_MiddleSchool
Congress Middle School	Boynton Beach	http://www.edline.net/pages/CongressMiddleSchool
Conniston Community Middle School	West Palm Beach	http://www.edline.net/pages/Conniston_Middle_School
Crestwood	Royal Palm Beach	http://www.edline.net/pages/Crestwood_MS
Don Estridge High Tech Middle School	Boca Raton	https://www.palmbeachschools.org/DonEstridgeMiddle
Eagles Landing Middle School	Boca Raton	http://schoolwires.henry.k12.ga.us/elm/domain/2691
Emerald Cove Middle School	Wellington	http://www.edline.net/pages/emerald_cove_middle_school
Howell L. Watkins Middle School	Palm Beach Gardens	https://web.archive.org/web/20151017082712/http://www.palmbeachschools.org/schools/howellwatkins.htm
Independence Middle School	Jupiter	http://www.edline.net/pages/Independence_Middle_School
Indian Ridge School	West Palm Beach	http://www.edline.net/pages/IndianRidge
Jeaga Middle School	West Palm Beach	http://www.edline.net/pages/Jeaga_Middle_School
John F. Kennedy Middle School	Riviera Beach	http://www.edline.net/pages/John_F_Kennedy_Middle_School
Jupiter Middle School	Jupiter	http://www.edline.net/pages/Jupiter_Middle_School
L. C. Swain Middle School	Greenacres	http://www.edline.net/pages/lcsms
Lake Shore Middle School	Belle Glade	http://www.edline.net/pages/Lake_Shore_Middle_School
Lake Worth Middle School	Lake Worth	http://www.edline.net/pages/Lake_Worth_Middle_School
Lantana Community Middle School	Lantana	http://www.edline.net/pages/Lantana_Middle_School
Loggers Run Community Middle School	Boca Raton	http://www.edline.net/pages/Loggers_Run_Community_Middle_
Odyssey Middle School	Boynton Beach	http://www.edline.net/pages/Odyssey_Middle
Okeeheelee Middle School	West Palm Beach	http://www.okeeheelee.org/
Omni Middle School	Boca Raton	http://www.edline.net/pages/oms
Osceola Creek Middle School	Loxahatchee	http://www.edline.net/pages/ocms
Pahokee Middle School	Pahokee	https://web.archive.org/web/20130130164656/http://www.palmbeach.k12.fl.us/pahokeemiddlesrhigh/
Palm Springs Community Middle School	West Palm Beach	http://www.edline.net/pages/Palm_Springs_C_M_S
Polo Park Middle School	Wellington	http://www.edline.net/pages/polo_park_middle_school
Roosevelt Community Middle School	West Palm Beach	http://www.edline.net/pages/Roosevelt_Middle_School
Royal Palm School	Royal Palm Beach	http://www.edline.net/pages/royal_palm_school
The Conservatory School @ North Palm Beach School	North Palm Beach	http://www.theconservatoryschool.org/
Tradewinds Middle School	Greenacres	http://www.edline.net/pages/Tradewinds_Middle_School
Village Academy on the Art & Sara Jo Kobacker Campus School	Delray Beach	http://www.edline.net/pages/Village_Academy
Watson B. Duncan Middle School	Palm Beach Gardens	http://www.edline.net/pages/Watson_B__Duncan_Middle_School
Wellington Landings Middle School	Wellington	http://www.edline.net/pages/Wellington_Landings_MS
Western Pines Middle School	West Palm Beach	http://www.edline.net/pages/Western_Pines_Middle_School
Woodlands Middle School	Lake Worth	http://www.edline.net/pages/Woodlands_Middle_School

== Pinellas County ==
School	Location	Website
Azalea Middle School	St. Petersburg	http://www.pcsb.org/azalea-ms
Bay Point Middle School	St. Petersburg	http://www.pcsb.org/baypoint-ms
Carwise Middle School	Palm Harbor	http://www.pcsb.org/carwise-ms
Clearwater Fundamental School	Clearwater	http://pcsb.org/clearwaterfund-ms
Dunedin Highland Middle School	Dunedin	http://www.pcsb.org/dunedin-ms
East Lake Middle School Academy of Engineering	Tarpon Springs	http://www.pcsb.org/eastlake-ms
John Hopkins Middle School	St. Petersburg	http://www.pcsb.org/hopkins-ms
Largo Middle School	Largo	http://www.pcsb.org/largo-ms
Meadowlawn Middle School	St. Petersburg	http://www.pcsb.org/meadowlawn-ms
Morgan Fitzgerald Middle School	Largo	http://www.pcsb.org/fitzgerald-ms
Oak Grove Middle School	Clearwater	http://www.pcsb.org/oakgrove-ms
Osceola Middle School	Seminole	http://www.pcsb.org/osceola-ms
Palm Harbor Middle School	Palm Harbor	http://www.pcsb.org/ph-ms
Pinellas Park Middle School	Pinellas Park	http://www.pcsb.org/pp-ms
Safety Harbor Middle School	Safety Harbor	http://www.pcsb.org/safetyharbor-ms
Seminole Middle School	Seminole	http://www.pcsb.org/seminole-ms
Tarpon Springs Middle School	Tarpon Springs	http://www.pcsb.org/tarpon-ms
Thurgood Marshall Fundamental School	St. Petersburg	http://www.pcsb.org/marshall-ms
Tyrone Middle School	St. Petersburg	http://pcsb.org/tyrone-ms

== Polk County ==
School	Location	Website
Bartow Middle School	Bartow	http://schools.polk-fl.net/BMS/
Berkley Accelerated Middle School	Auburndale	http://www.berkleymiddle.net
Bok Academy	Lake Wales	
Compass Middle Charter School	Bartow	http://www.compassmiddlecharter.net
Crystal Academy of Science and Engineering	Lakeland	http://schools.polk-fl.net/clms/academy.htm
Crystal Lake Middle School	Lakeland	http://schools.polk-fl.net/clms
Daniel Jenkins Academy of Technology	Haines City	http://schools.polk-fl.net/dja
Davenport School of the Arts	Davenport	http://www.davenportschoolofthearts.com
Denison Middle School	Winter Haven	http://schools.polk-fl.net/denisonmiddle
Discovery Academy of Lake Alfred	Lake Alfred	http://www.discoveryacademy.org
Doris A Sanders Learning Center	Lakeland	http://schools.polk-fl.net/dslc
Dundee Ridge Middle Academy	Dundee, Florida	http://dra.polk-fl.net
Fort Meade Middle-Senior School	Fort Meade	http://fmmshs.polk-fl.net
Frostproof Middle-Senior School	Frostproof, Florida	http://fmshs.polk-fl.net/
Gause Academy of Leadership	Bartow	http://schools.polk-fl.net/gause
Jean O'Dell Learning Center	Bartow	http://schools.polk-fl.net/jolc
Jere L. Sambaugh Middle School	Auburndale	http://www.stambaughmiddle.com
Jewett Middle Academy Magnet School	Winter Haven	http://www.jewettacademymagnet.com
Jewett School of the Arts	Winter Haven	http://jsa.polk-fl.net
Karen M. Siegel Academy	Lake Alfred	http://schools.polk-fl.net/kmsa
Kathleen Middle School	Lakeland	http://schools.polk-fl.net/kathleenmiddle
Lake Alfred-Addair Middle School	Lake Alfred	http://laams.polk-fl.net
Lake Gibson Middle School	Lakeland	http://www.lakegibsonmiddle.com
Lake Marion Creek Middle School	Poinciana	http://schools.polk-fl.net/lmcm
Lakeland Highlands Middle School	Lakeland	http://schools.polk-fl.net/LHMS
Lakeland Montessori Middle at The Polk Museum of Art	Lakeland	http://www.lakelandmontessorimiddle.com
Lawton Chiles Middle Academy	Lakeland	http://www.lcmaknightsonline.com
McKeel Academy of Technology	Lakeland	http://www.mckeelacademy.com
McLaughlin Middle School and Fine Arts Academy	Lake Wales	http://schools.polk-fl.net/mclaughlin
Mulberry Middle School	Mulberry	http://mms.polk-fl.net
New Beginnings High School	Winter Haven	http://www.newbhs.net
Rochelle School of the Arts	Lakeland	http://rochellearts.polk-fl.net
Roosevelt Academy	Lake Wales	http://schools.polk-fl.net/rooseveltacademy
Rosabelle W. Blake Academy	Lakeland	http://www.blakeacademy.com
Shelley S. Boone Middle School	Haines City	http://boonemiddle.polk-fl.net/
Sleepy Hill Middle School	Lakeland	http://schools.polk-fl.net/shms
Southwest Middle School	Lakeland	http://swms.polk-fl.net
Union Academy	Bartow	http://ua.polk-fl.net
Westwood Middle School	Winter Haven	http://westwood.polk-fl.net/

== Putnam County ==
School	Location	Website
C. H. Price Middle School	Interlachen	http://putnamprice.ss7.sharpschool.com/
C.L. Overturf, Jr. Sixth Grade Center	Palatka	http://putnamclo.ss7.sharpschool.com/
George C. Miller Intermediate School	Crescent City	http://putnammis.ss7.sharpschool.com/
Putnam Academy of Arts and Science Charter School	East Palatka	http://www.putnamacademy.org/
Robert Jenkins Middle School	Palatka	http://putnamjms.ss7.sharpschool.com/

== St. Johns County ==
School	Location	Website
Fruit Cove Middle School	St. Johns	http://www-fcs.stjohns.k12.fl.us
Alice B. Landrum Middle School	Ponte Vedra Beach	http://www.lms.stjohns.k12.fl.us
R.J. Murray Middle School	St. Augustine	http://www-mms.stjohns.k12.fl.us
Pacetti Bay Middle School	St. Augustine	http://www-pbm.stjohns.k12.fl.us
Gamble Rogers Middle School	St. Augustine	http://www-grms.stjohns.k12.fl.us
Sebastian Middle School	St. Augustine	http://www-sms.stjohns.k12.fl.us
Switzerland Point Middle School	St. Johns	http://www-raider.stjohns.k12.fl.us

== St. Lucie County ==
School	Location	Website
Allapattah Flats School	Port St. Lucie	http://schools.stlucie.k12.fl.us/apf/
Dan McCarty School	Fort Pierce	http://schools.stlucie.k12.fl.us/dmm/
Forest Grove Middle School	Fort Pierce	http://schools.stlucie.k12.fl.us/fgm/
Fort Pierce Magnet School of the Arts	Fort Pierce	http://schools.stlucie.k12.fl.us/fpm
Lincoln Park Academy	Fort Pierce	http://schools.stlucie.k12.fl.us/lpa
Manatee K-8 School	Port St. Lucie	http://schools.stlucie.k12.fl.us/man
NAU Charter School	Port St. Lucie	http://www.imagineschools.com/
Northport K-8 School	Port St. Lucie	http://schools.stlucie.k12.fl.us/npk/
Oak Hammock K-8 School	Port St. Lucie	http://schools.stlucie.k12.fl.us/oak
Palm Pointe Research School at Tradition School	Port St. Lucie	http://tradition.fau.edu
Renaissance Charter School	Port St. Lucie	http://www.stluciecharter.org
Renaissance Charter School at Tradition	Port St. Lucie	http://www.stluciecharter.org
Southern Oaks Middle School	Port St. Lucie	http://schools.stlucie.k12.fl.us/som
Southport Middle School	Port St. Lucie	http://schools.stlucie.k12.fl.us/spm
St. Lucie West K-8 School	Port St. Lucie	http://www.stlucie.k12.fl.us
Samuel S. Gaines Academy K-8 School	Fort Pierce	http://schools.stlucie.k12.fl.us/sga
West Gate K-8 School	Port St. Lucie	http://schools.stlucie.k12.fl.us/wgk

== Santa Rosa County ==
School	Location	Website
Avalon Middle School	Milton	https://www.santarosa.k12.fl.us/ams/
Central School	Milton	https://web.archive.org/web/20140407054024/https://www.santarosa.k12.fl.us/cs/
Gulf Breeze Middle School	Gulf Breeze	https://web.archive.org/web/20150813112113/https://www.santarosa.k12.fl.us/gbm/index.shtml
Hobbs Middle School	Milton	http://hobbsmiddleschool.weebly.com/
Holley-Navarre Middle School	Navarre	https://holleynavarremiddle.wixsite.com/hnmsbulldogs
King Middle School	Milton	https://web.archive.org/web/20150908091259/https://www.santarosa.k12.fl.us/kms/
Thomas L. Sims Middle School	Pace	https://web.archive.org/web/20150908092158/https://www.santarosa.k12.fl.us/sms/
Woodlawn Beach Middle School	Gulf Breeze	https://www.santarosa.k12.fl.us/wbm/

== Sarasota County ==
School	Location	Website
Booker Middle School	Sarasota	http://www.sarasotacountyschools.net/schools/bookermiddle/
Brookside Middle School	Sarasota	http://www.sarasotacountyschools.net/schools/brookside/
Heron Creek Middle School	North Port	http://www.sarasotacountyschools.net/schools/heroncreek/
Laurel Nokomis School	Nokomis	http://www.sarasotacountyschools.net/schools/laurelnokomis/
McIntosh Middle School	Sarasota	http://www.sarasotacountyschools.net/schools/mcintosh/
Sarasota Middle School	Sarasota	http://www.sarasotacountyschools.net/schools/sarasotamiddle/
Venice Middle School	Venice	http://sarasotacountyschools.net/schools/venicemiddle/
Woodland Middle School	North Port	http://sarasotacountyschools.net/schools/woodland

== Seminole County ==
School	Location	Website
Chiles Middle School	Oviedo	http://www.lcms.scps.k12.fl.us
Greenwood Lakes School	Lady Mary	http://www.greenwoodlakes.scps.k12.fl.us
Indian Trails School	Winter Springs	http://www.indiantrails.scps.k12.fl.us/
Jackson Heights School	Oviedo	http://www.jhms.scps.k12.fl.us
Markham Woods School	Lake Mary	http://www.mwms.scps.k12.fl.us
Millennium Middle School	Sanford	http://www.millennium.scps.k12.fl.us
Milwee Middle School	Longwood	http://www.milwee.scps.k12.fl.us
Rock Lake Middle School	Longwood	http://www.rocklakemiddle.scps.k12.fl.us
Sanford Middle School	Sanford	http://www.sanford.scps.k12.fl.us
South Seminole School	Casselberry	http://www.ssms.scps.k12.fl.us
Teague Middle School	Altamonte Springs	http://www.teague.scps.k12.fl.us
Tuskawilla Middle School	Oviedo	http://www.tuskawilla.scps.k12.fl.us

== Sumter County ==
School	Location	Website
South Sumter Middle School	Webster	http://www.sumter.k12.fl.us/Domain/12
Wildwood Middle High School	Wildwood	http://www.sumter.k12.fl.us/Domain/13

== Suwannee County ==
School	Location	Website
Branford High School	Branford	https://web.archive.org/web/20150706103726/http://suwannee.bhs.schooldesk.net/
Suwannee Middle School	Live Oak	https://web.archive.org/web/20150816002706/http://suwannee.sms.schooldesk.net/

== Taylor County ==
School	Location	Website
Taylor County Middle School	Perry	http://taylormiddle.fl.tcm.schoolinsites.com/

== Union County ==
School	Location	Website
Lake Butler Middle School	Lake Butler	http://union.lbms.schooldesk.net/

== Volusia County ==
School	Location	Website
Campbell Middle School	Daytona Beach	http://myvolusiaschools.org/school/Campbell/Pages/default.aspx
Creekside Middle School	Port Orange	http://myvolusiaschools.org/school/Creekside/Pages/default.aspx
DeLand Middle School	DeLand	http://myvolusiaschools.org/school/Deland/Pages/default.aspx
Deltona Middle School	Deltona	http://myvolusiaschools.org/school/DeltonaMiddle/Pages/default.aspx
Galaxy Middle School	Deltona	http://myvolusiaschools.org/school/GalaxyMiddle/Pages/default.aspx
Heritage Middle School	Deltona	http://myvolusiaschools.org/school/HeritageMiddle/Pages/default.aspx
Hinson Middle School	Daytona Beach	http://myvolusiaschools.org/school/HinsonMiddle/Pages/default.aspx
Holly Hill School	Holly Hill	http://myvolusiaschools.org/school/HollyHill/Pages/default.aspx
New Smyrna Beach Middle School	New Smyrna Beach	http://myvolusiaschools.org/school/NewSmyrnaBeach/Pages/default.aspx
Ormond Beach Middle School	Ormond Beach	http://myvolusiaschools.org/school/OrmondBeachMiddle/Pages/default.aspx
River Springs Middle School	Orange City	http://myvolusiaschools.org/school/RiverSpringsMiddle/Pages/default.aspx
Silver Sands Middle School	Port Orange	http://myvolusiaschools.org/school/SilverSandsMiddle/Pages/default.aspx
Southwestern Middle School	DeLand	http://myvolusiaschools.org/school/SouthwesternMiddle/Pages/default.aspx

== Wakulla County ==
School	Location	Website
Riversprings Middle School	Crawfordville	http://rms.wcsb.us/
Wakulla Middle School	Crawfordville	http://wms.wcsb.us/
Wakulla Coast Charter School Of Arts Science & Technology	St. Marks	http://coast.wcsb.us/

== Walton County ==
School	Location	Website
Emerald Coast Middle School	Santa Rosa Beach	http://ecm.walton.k12.fl.us/home
Freeport Middle School	Freeport, Florida	http://fms.walton.k12.fl.us/
Paxton School	Paxton	http://pax.walton.k12.fl.us/
Walton Middle School	DeFuniak Springs	https://web.archive.org/web/20140521195541/http://wms.walton.k12.fl.us/INDEX.htm

== Washington County ==
School	Location	Website
Roulhac Middle School	Chipley	http://rms.wcsdschools.com/
Vernon Middle County	Vernon	http://vms.wcsdschools.com/

== See also ==
- List of school districts in Florida
- List of high schools in Florida
