= List of Miami-Dade County Public Schools =

Miami-Dade County Public Schools is the fourth largest school system in the United States with over 392 schools, 345,000 students and over 40,000 employees.

== Schools ==
The district covers a total of 415 institutions, including:

- 171 elementary schools
- 50 middle schools
- 50 K–8 centers
- 37 high schools
- 54 charter schools
- 23 vocational schools
- 5 magnet schools
- 18 alternative schools
- 5 special education centers

=== Elementary schools ===
There are 171 elementary schools serving MDCPS. These schools usually teach grades from Pre-K to 5th or 6th.

- Amelia Earhart Elementary School
- Arch Creek Elementary School
- Arcola Lake Elementary School
- Auburndale Elementary School
- Avocado Elementary School
- Banyan Elementary School
- Barbara Hawkins Elementary School
- Bel-Aire Elementary School
- Ben Sheppard Elementary School
- Bent Tree Elementary School
- Biscayne Elementary School
- Biscayne Gardens Elementary School
- Blue Lakes Elementary School
- Bowman Foster Ashe K-8 Academy
- Brentwood Elementary School
- Broadmoor Elementary School
- Bunche Park Elementary School
- Calusa Elementary School
- Carol City Elementary School
- Charles D. Wyche, Jr. Elementary School
- Charles R. Hadley Elementary School
- Christina M. Eve Elementary School
- Claude Pepper Elementary School
- Comstock Elementary School
- Coral Park Elementary School
- Coral Reef Elementary School
- Coral Terrace Elementary School
- Crestview Elementary School
- Cutler Ridge Elementary School
- David Fairchild Elementary School
- Dante B. Fascell Elementary School
- Devon Aire K-8 Center
- Dr. Carlos J. Finlay Elementary School
- Dr. Edward L. Whigham Primary Learning Center
- Dr. Frederica S. Wilson/Skyway Elementary School
- Dr. Gilbert L. Porter Elementary School
- Dr. Henry E. Perrine Academy of the Arts
- Dr. Manuel Barreiro Elementary School
- Dr. Robert B. Ingram Elementary School
- Dr. William A Chapman Elementary School
- E.W.F. Stirrup Elementary School
- Earlington Heights Elementary School
- Edison Park K-8 Center
- Emerson Elementary School
- Eneida Massas Hartner Elementary School
- Fairlawn Elementary School
- Flagami Elementary School
- Flamingo Elementary School
- Florida City Elementary School
- Frederick Douglass Elementary School
- Fulford Elementary School
- George Washington Carver Elementary School
- Gertrude Edelmann/Sabal Palm Elementary School
- Gloria Floyd Elementary School
- Golden Glades Elementary School
- Goulds Elementary School
- Gratigny Elementary School
- Greenglade Elementary School
- Greynolds Park Elementary School
- Gulfstream Elementary School
- Henry M. Flagler Elementary School
- Hialeah Elementary School
- Hialeah Gardens Elementary School
- Hibiscus Elementary School
- Holmes Elementary School
- Howard Drive Elementary School
- J.W. Johnson Elementary School
- Jack D. Gordon Panther Primary Learning Center
- James H. Bright Elementary School
- Joe Hall Elementary School
- Joella C. Good Elementary School
- John G. Dupuis Elementary School
- John I. Smith K-8 Center
- Kendale Elementary School
- Kendale Lakes Elementary School
- Kensington Park Elementary School
- Kinloch Park Elementary School
- Lake Stevens Elementary School
- Lakeview Elementary School
- Laura C. Sanders Elementary School
- Lenora B. Smith Elementary School
- Liberty City Elementary School
- Lorah Park Elementary School
- Ludlam Elementary School
- Mae Walters Elementary School
- Marjory Stoneman Douglas Elementary School
- Maya Angelou Elementary School
- Meadowlane Elementary School
- Melrose Elementary School
- South Pointe Elementary School
- Miami Gardens Elementary School
- Miami Heights Elementary School
- Miami Shores Elementary School
- Miami Springs Elementary School
- Nathan Young Elementary School
- Natural Bridge Elementary School
- New Opportunity Educational Center
- Norland Elementary School
- Norma Butler Bossard Elementary School
- North Beach Elementary School
- North Dade Center for Modern Language
- North Glade Elementary School
- North Hialeah Elementary School
- North Miami Elementary School
- North Twin Lakes Elementary School
- Norwood Elementary School
- Oak Grove Elementary School
- Ojus Elementary School
- Oliver Hoover Elementary School
- Olympia Heights Elementary School
- Orchard Villa Elementary School
- Palm Lakes Elementary School
- Palm Springs North Elementary School
- Palmetto Elementary School
- Parkway Elementary School
- Paul Laurence Dunbar K-8 Center
- Perrine Academy of the Arts
- Phillis Wheatley Elementary School
- Phyllis Ruth Miller Elementary School
- Pine Lake Elementary School
- Pine Villa Elementary School
- Pinecrest Elementary School
- Rainbow Park Elementary School
- Redland Elementary School
- Redondo Elementary School
- Riverside Elementary School
- Robert Russa Moton Elementary School
- Rockway Elementary School
- Royal Green Elementary School
- Royal Palm Elementary School
- Santa Clara Elementary School
- Scott Lake Elementary School
- Seminole Elementary School
- Shenandoah Elementary School
- Silver Bluff Elementary School
- Snapper Creek Elementary School
- South Hialeah Elementary
- South Miami Heights Elementary School
- Spanish Lake Elementary School
- Springview Elementary School
- Sunset Elementary School
- Sunset Park Elementary School
- Sweetwater Elementary School
- Sylvania Heights Elementary School
- Toussaint L'Ouverture Elementary School
- Treasure Island Elementary School
- Tropical Elementary School
- Twin Lakes Elementary School
- Van E. Blanton Elementary School
- Village Green Elementary School
- Virginia A. Boone/Highland Oaks Elementary School
- W. J. Bryan Elementary School
- Wesley Matthews Elementary School
- West Hialeah Gardens Elementary School
- Whispering Pines Elementary School
- William A. Chapman Elementary School
- William Lehman Elementary School
- Zora Neale Hurston Elementary School

=== Middle schools ===
There are 58 middle schools serving MDCPS. They usually teach grades 6th to 8th, with exceptions also including 9th grade.

- Allapattah Middle School
- Andover Middle School
- Arvida Middle School
- Brownsville Middle School
- Campbell Drive K-8 Center
- Carol City Middle School
- Charles R. Drew K-8 Center
- Citrus Grove Middle School
- Cutler Bay Middle School
- Doral Academy Charter Middle School
- George Washington Carver Middle School
- Glades Middle School
- Hammocks Middle School
- Henry H. Filer Middle School
- Herbert A. Ammons Middle School
- Hialeah Gardens Middle School
- Hialeah Middle School
- Highland Oaks Middle School
- Homestead Middle School
- Horace Mann Middle School
- Howard D. McMillan Middle School
- John F. Kennedy Middle School
- Jorge Mas Canosa Middle School
- Jose de Diego Middle School
- Kinloch Park Middle School
- Lake Stevens Middle School
- Lamar Louise Curry Middle School
- Lawton Chiles Middle School
- Madison Middle School
- Miami Arts Studio @Zelda Glazer 6-12
- Miami Edison Middle School
- Miami Lakes Middle School
- Miami Springs Middle School
- Nautilus Middle School
- Norland Middle School
- North Dade Middle School
- North Miami Middle School
- Palm Springs Middle School
- Palmetto Middle School
- Miami Lakes Educational Center, Parkway Campus
- Paul W. Bell Middle School
- Ponce de Leon Middle School
- Redland Middle School
- Richmond Heights Middle School
- Riviera Middle School
- Rockway Middle School
- Ruben Dario Middle School
- Shenandoah Middle School
- South Dade Middle School, grades 4-8
- South Miami Middle School
- Southwood Middle School
- Thomas Jefferson Biscayne Gardens K-8 Academy
- W.R. Thomas Middle School
- West Miami Middle School
- Westview Middle School

=== K–8 centers ===
There are 50 kindergarten-to-8th grade centers (or "academies") serving MDCPS. K–8 centers are generally set up to serve communities with limited building space for two separate campuses. They are run as both an elementary and middle school out of the same campus, with joint administration, staff, and schedules. Middle school-aged students generally have separate buildings dedicated to them. MDCPS provides a full list of the K-8 schools.

- Ada Merritt
- Air Base K-8 Center
- Andrea Castillo Preparatory Academy
- Aventura Waterways
- Benjamin Franklin
- Bob Graham Education Center
- Bowman Ashe/Doolin
- Campbell Drive
- Caribbean K-8 Center
- Carrie P. Meek/Westview
- Charles R. Drew
- Citrus Grove K-8 Center
- Coconut Palm
- Coral Gables Preparatory Academy
- Coral Way Bilingual
- Cypress K-8 Center
- David Lawrence Jr.
- Devon Aire K-8 Center
- Dr. Henry W. Mack/West Little River
- Dr. Rolando Espinosa K-8 Center
- Dr. Toni Bilbao Preparatory Academy
- Edison Park K-8 Center
- Ernest R Graham K-8 Academy
- Ethel Koger Beckham K-8 Center
- Eugenia B. Thomas
- Everglades
- Frank C. Martin International
- Gateway Environmental
- Henry E. S. Reeves K-8 Center
- Hubert O. Sibley K-8 Academy
- Henry S West Laboratory School
- Irving & Beatrice Peskoe
- Jane S. Roberts
- John I. Smith
- Kendall Square
- Kenwood K-8 Center
- Key Biscayne
- Leewood
- Leisure City
- Lillie C. Evans
- Linda Lentin
- Marcus A. Milam
- Madie Ives
- Mandarin Lakes
- Miami Beach Fienberg/Fischer K-8
- Miami Lakes
- Morningside
- Myrtle Grove
- Norman S. Edelcup/Sunny Isles Beach
- North County
- Paul Laurence Dunbar
- Ruth K. Broad Bay Harbor K-8 Center Archived December 14, 2016, at the Wayback Machine
- South Miami
- Southside Preparatory Academy
- Vineland
- West Homestead
- West Lakes Preparatory Academy
- Winston Park

=== High schools ===
There are 37 high schools serving MDCPS. They teach grades from 9th to 12th. The first high school, Miami Senior High School, opened in 1898.

- Academy for Advanced Academics (2009)
- Alonzo and Tracy Mourning Senior High Biscayne Bay Campus (2009)
- American Senior High School (1976)
- Barbara Goleman Senior High School (1995)
- J.C. Bermudez Doral Senior High School (2020)
- Coral Gables Senior High School (1950)
- Coral Reef Senior High School(1997)
- Cutler Bay Senior High School (2012)
- Dr. Michael M. Krop Senior High School (1998)
- Felix Varela Senior High School (2000)
- G. Holmes Braddock Senior High School (1989)
- Hialeah Gardens High School (2009)
- Hialeah Senior High School (1954)
- Hialeah-Miami Lakes Senior High School (1971)
- Homestead High School (1979)
- John A. Ferguson Senior High School (2003)
- Miami Beach Senior High School (1924)
- Miami Carol City Senior High School (1963)
- Miami Central Senior High School (1959)
- Miami Coral Park Senior High School (1963)
- Miami Edison Senior High School (1930)
- Miami High School (1903)
- Miami Jackson Senior High School (1898)
- Miami Killian Senior High School (1965)
- Miami Norland Senior High School (1958)
- Miami Northwestern Senior High School (1951)
- Miami Palmetto Senior High School (1958)
- Miami Southridge Senior High School (1974)
- Miami Springs Senior High School (1964)
- Miami Sunset Senior High School (1977)
- North Miami Beach Senior High School (1971)
- North Miami Senior High School (1954)
- Ronald W. Reagan/Doral High School (2006)
- School for Advanced Studies (1988)
- South Dade Senior High School (1953)
- South Miami Senior High School (1971)
- Southwest Miami Senior High School (1956)
- Booker T. Washington Senior High School (1926)
- Westland Hialeah Senior High School (2007)
- Young Men's Preparatory Academy (all-boys) (2008)

==== Magnet high schools ====
There are 120 magnet schools serving MDCPS. They normally serve grades 9th to 12th. These schools do not take in students from their area. Instead, students must apply and test into these schools, which offer specific courses of study.

- Arthur & Polly Mays Conservatory of the Arts 6-12
- Booker T. Washington Senior High School
- BioTECH @ Richmond Heights
- Center for International Education
- Coral Reef Senior High School
- Cutler Bay Senior High School
- Design and Architecture High School (DASH)
- Hialeah Miami-Lakes iPrep Academy
- International Studies Preparatory Academy
- iTech @ Thomas A. Edison Educational Center
- José Martí MAST 6-12 Academy
- Law Enforcement Officers' Memorial High School
- Maritime and Science Technology Academy (MAST Academy)
- MAST @ FIU Biscayne Bay Campus
- MAST Academy @ Homestead Medical Magnet
- Miami Arts Studio 6-12 @ Zelda Glazer

- Miami Beach Senior High School
- Miami Lakes Educational Center
- New World School of the Arts
- Robert Morgan Educational Center
- School for Advanced Studies
- South Dade High School
- TERRA Environmental Research Institute
- William H. Turner Technical Arts High School
- Young Women's Preparatory Academy

=== 6-12 Schools ===
- iPreparatory Academy

=== Adult/vocational centers ===
There are 23 adult/vocational centers, more commonly referred to as "night schools", serving MDCPS. These centers are set up for adults to earn G.E.D.s, or for students older than the age of 16 to make up classes they have failed and have no slots for in their daytime schedules. Some night schools also offer vocational programs and free English classes for non-native speakers. Adult centers also offer free citizenship classes. They also offer Saturday classes to accommodate students who can't attend during the week. They are generally housed at high school campuses, with classes taking place in the evenings.

- American High School Adult Center
- Coral Gables High School Adult Center
- D.A. Dorsey Educational Center
- English Center
- George T. Baker Aviation
- Hialeah Adult Education Center
- Hialeah-Miami Lakes Senior High School Adult Center
- Lindsey Hopkins Technology Center
- Miami Beach High School Adult Center
- Miami Coral Park High School Adult Center
- Miami Jackson High School Adult Center
- Miami Lakes Adult Education Center
- Miami Palmetto High School Adult Education Center
- Miami Senior High School Adult Education Center
- Miami Springs Senior High School Adult Education Center
- Miami Sunset High School Adult Center
- North Miami High School Adult Center
- Robert Morgan Vocational Technical Institute
- South Dade High School Adult Center
- South Dade High School Skills Center
- Southwest High School Adult Center
- Virtual Adult Center - online school
- William H. Turner Technical Adult & Community Education Center

=== Charter schools ===
There are 53 charter schools that are set up as publicly funded, but are privately operated, in MDCPS. Currently there are around 19,000 students enrolled in charter schools in the county. Students that attend these schools do not need to pass an examination before being considered for a spot, but must maintain specific grades and behavioral standards to maintain their enrollment.

- Archimedean Academy (elementary)
- Archimedean Middle Conservatory (middle)
- Archimedean Upper Conservatory (high)
- ASPIRA Eugenio Maria de Hostos Youth Leadership (middle)
- ASPIRA Raúl Arnaldo Martinez Charter School (middle)
- ASPIRA South Youth Leadership Charter School (middle)
- Aventura City of Excellence Charter School (K-8 center)
- Balere Language Academy (K-8 center)
- Bridgeprep Academy of Arts and Minds (high)
- The Charter School at Waterstone (K-8 center)
- A Child's Journey Charter School (elementary)
- City of Hialeah Educational Academy (high)
- Coral Reef Montessori Academy Charter School (K-8 center)
- Doctors Charter School of Miami Shores (middle/high)
- Doral Academy (elementary)
- Doral Academy Charter Middle School (middle)
- Doral Academy High School (high)
- Doral Performing Arts & Entertainment Academy (high)
- Downtown Doral Charter Elementary School (elementary)
- Downtown Miami Charter School (elementary)
- Early Beginnings Academy – Civic Center (elementary)
- Early Beginnings Academy – North Shore (elementary)
- Everglades Preparatory Academy (middle/high)
- Florida International Academy (middle)
- International Studies Charter High School (high)
- Keys Gate Charter School (K-8 center)
- Lawrence Academy (middle)
- Life Skills Center Miami-Dade County (high)
- Mater Academy Charter Middle/High School (middle/high)
- Mater Academy East Charter School (middle/high)
- Mater Academy Elementary School (elementary)
- Mater East Academy Middle School (middle)
- Mater Performing Arts & Entertainment Academy (high)
- Miami Arts Charter School (middle/high)
- Miami Children's Museum Charter School (elementary)
- Miami Community Charter School (elementary)
- Oxford Academy of Miami (elementary)
- Palm Glades Preparatory Academy (middle/high)
- Pinecrest Academy Charter Middle School (middle)
- Pinecrest Preparatory (high)
- Pinecrest Preparatory Academy (elementary)
- Renaissance Elementary Charter School (elementary)
- Renaissance Middle Charter School (middle)
- Rosa Parks Charter School/Florida City (K-8 center)
- Sandor Wiener School of Opportunity (elementary)
- Sandor Wiener School of Opportunity, South (elementary)
- School for Integrated Academics & Technologies (high)
- Somerset Academy (elementary)
- Somerset Academy Charter High School (high)
- Somerset Academy Charter Middle School (middle)
- Somerset Academy Charter South Miami (elementary and middle)
- Spiral Tech Elementary Charter School (elementary)
- Spirit City Academy (middle)
- Summerville Advantage Academy (elementary)
- Sunshine Academy (K-8 center)
- Theodore R. and Thelma A. Gibson Charter School (K-8 center)
- The SEED School of Miami (6th-12th)
- Transitional Learning Academy (middle/high)
- Youth Co-Op Charter School (K-8 center)

=== Alternative schools ===
There are 16 alternative schools serving MDCPS. They are set up for as a last resort for students who have recurring behavioral or extreme academic problems. Any child released from a youth detention center must attend an alternative school until deemed ready to return to normal school.

- The 500 Role Model Academy
- Academy for Community Education
- Alternative Outreach Program
- C.O.P.E. North Alternative Education
- Corporate Academy North
- Corporate Academy South
- D.A. Dorsey Educational Center
- Dorothy Wallace Educational Center
- Headstart Transition Center
- J. R. E. Lee Educational Center
- Jann Mann Opportunity Education
- Juvenile Justice Center
- M-DVS, Miami Dade Virtual School/FLVS
- Miami Douglas MacArthur North
- Miami Douglas MacArthur South
- TAP Program

=== Specialized centers ===
There are five specialized centers serving MDCPS. They are for students with extreme mental or learning disabilities which would impair them from attending classes with students without these disabilities. It is becoming more and more common for regular schools to set up their own specialized education (special ed) programs.

- Instructional Systemwide Center - administrative office that runs the individual school programs
- Merrick Education Center
- Neva King Cooper Educational Center
- Robert Rennick Education Center
- Ruth Owens Krusé Education Center

== Gallery ==
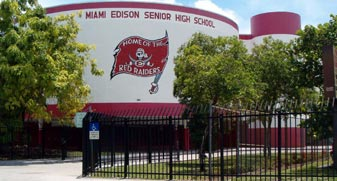
Miami Edison High School, founded in 1930

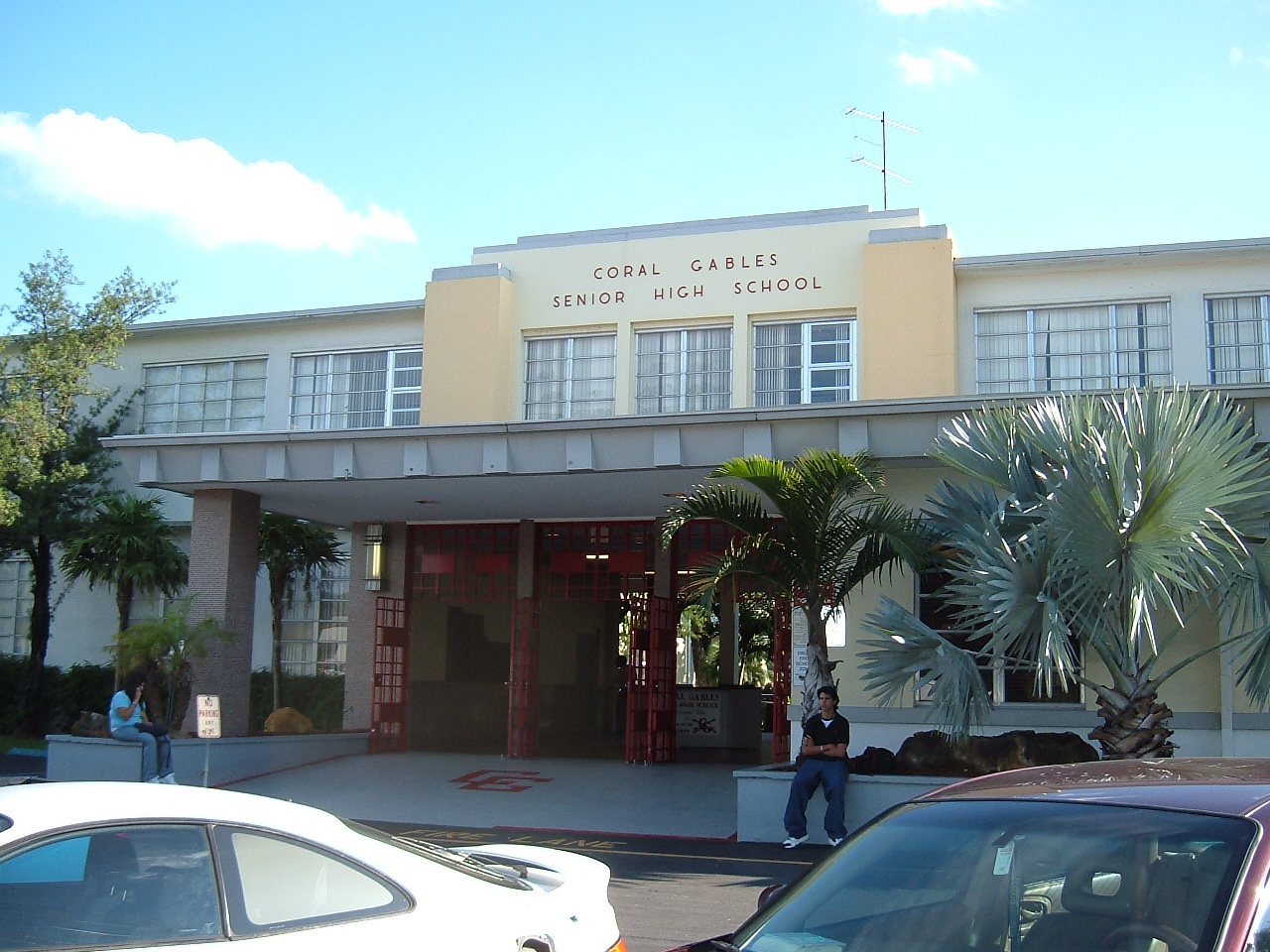
Coral Gables Senior High School, founded in 1950

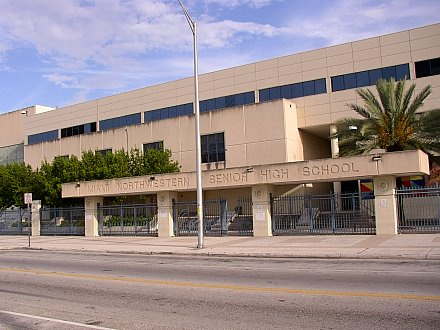
Miami Northwestern High School, founded in 1951

North Miami Senior High School, founded in 1954

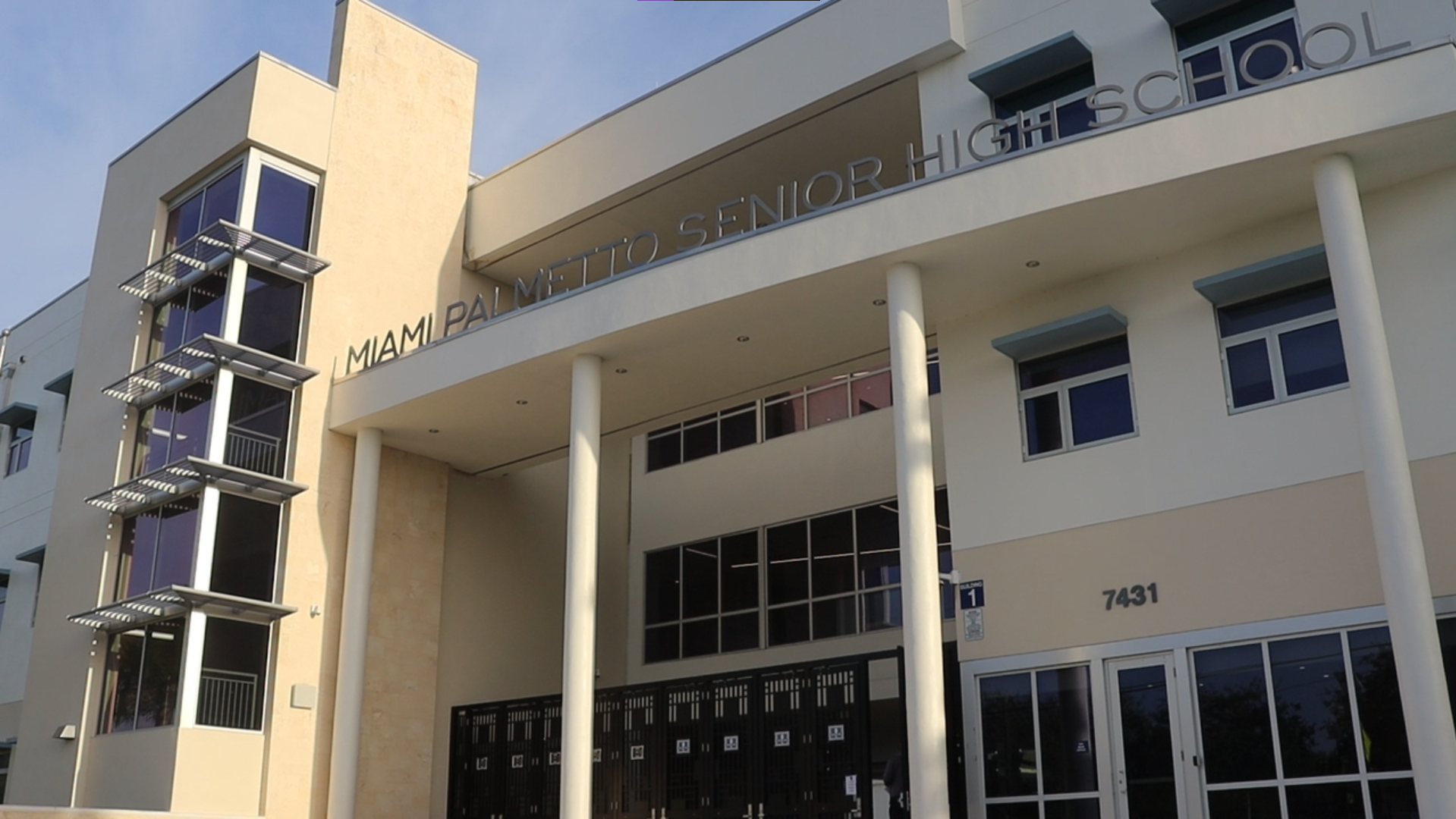
Miami Palmetto Senior High School, founded in 1958

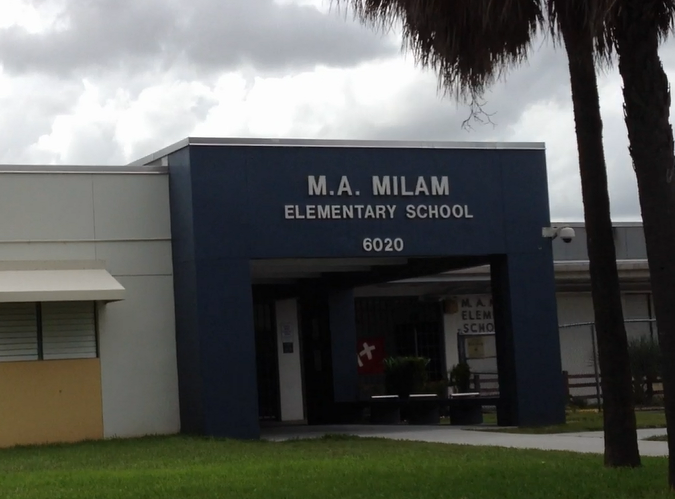
Elementary entrance to M.A. Milam K-8 Center, founded in 1961

Miami Springs High School, founded in 1964

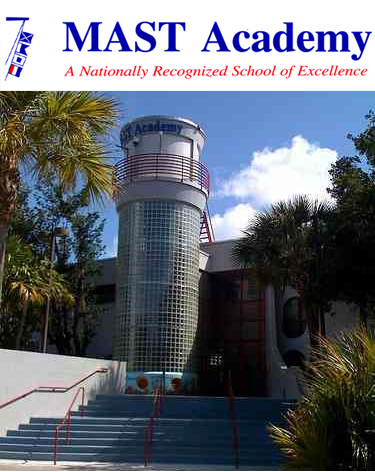
MAST Academy, founded in 1990
