= Fontainebleau, Florida =

- Census-designated place
- Location in Miami-Dade County and the state of Florida

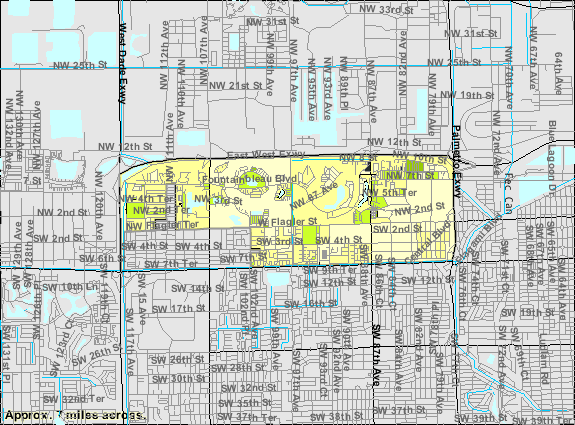
- U.S. Census Bureau map showing CDP boundaries
- Coordinates: 25°46′26″N 80°21′42″W
- Country: United States
- State: Florida
- County: Miami-Dade

Area
  - Total: 4.15 sq mi (10.74 km^{2})
  - Land: 3.96 sq mi (10.25 km^{2})
  - Water: 0.19 sq mi (0.49 km^{2})
- Elevation: 7 ft (2.1 m)

Population (2020)
  - Total: 59,870
  - Density: 15,129.5/sq mi (5,841.54/km^{2})
- Time zone: UTC-5 (Eastern (EST))
  - Summer (DST): UTC-4 (EDT)
- ZIP Codes: 33126, 33144, 33172, 33174 (all Miami)
- Area codes: 305, 786, 645
- FIPS code: 12-24562
- GNIS feature ID: 2402505

Fontainebleau or Fountainebleau is a census-designated place (CDP) in Miami-Dade County, Florida, United States. It is part of the Miami metropolitan area of South Florida. The population was 59,870 during the 2020 census.

== Geography ==
Fontainebleau is located 10 miles (16 km) west of downtown Miami. It is bordered to the west by the city of Sweetwater, to the north by the city of Doral, and to the south by unincorporated Westchester.

According to the U.S. Census Bureau, the CDP has a total area of 4.15 square miles (10.7 km^{2}), of which 3.96 square miles (10.3 km^{2}) are land and 0.10 square miles (0.26 km^{2}), or 4.56%, are water.

== History ==
The neighborhood takes its name from the famed Miami Beach resort. In 1970, Ben Novack, the Fontainebleau's original owner, grew jealous of Doris and Alfred Kaskel's plans in Doral and wanted to create his own planned golf course, resort, and community. It was to be known as Fontainebleau Park. Novack, however, soon fell into financial problems (and the Fontainebleau Park would play a part in the hotel's foreclosure in 1977). The company Trafalgar Developers would go on to develop the community under the "Fontainebleau" name, but no link to the famed hotel would ever be mentioned in promotional materials when the community opened in the 1970s.

The community of Fontainebleau Park itself was a collection of sub-divided villages around two 18-hole golf courses. (East and West course now closed and built upon). The original sales office for Trafalgar Development was located at what is now the Fontainebleau Office Park located at the main Fontainebleau Park entrance and West Flagler Street. Fontainebleau Park West's sales office (west of N.W. 97th Avenue) was at what is now "Soleil Condominiums". While the eastern half of the community was heavily designed for condominiums and apartments, the western portion of the community included "Village Homes", single-family homes, "Garden Homes", and townhomes.

== Demographics ==
Historical population
Census	Pop.	Note	%±
2000	59,549		—
2010	59,764		0.4%
2020	59,870		0.2%

=== 2020 census ===
Fontainebleau, Florida – Racial and ethnic composition Note: the US Census treats Hispanic/Latino as an ethnic category. This table excludes Latinos from the racial categories and assigns them to a separate category. Hispanics/Latinos may be of any race.
Race / Ethnicity (NH = Non-Hispanic)	Pop 2010	Pop 2020	% 2010	% 2020
White (NH)	3,558	3,418	5.95%	5.71%
Black or African American (NH)	415	422	0.69%	0.70%
Native American or Alaska Native (NH)	19	26	0.03%	0.04%
Asian (NH)	824	1,326	1.38%	2.21%
Pacific Islander or Native Hawaiian (NH)	0	6	0.00%	0.01%
Some other race (NH)	67	225	0.11%	0.38%
Mixed race or Multiracial (NH)	154	492	0.26%	0.82%
Hispanic or Latino (any race)	54,727	53,955	91.57%	90.12%
Total	59,764	59,870	100.00%	100.00%

As of the 2020 United States census, there were 59,870 people, 20,323 households, and 14,670 families residing in the CDP.

As of the 2010 United States census, there were 59,764 people, 20,726 households, and 15,298 families residing in the CDP.

=== 2000 census ===
In 2000, 34.9% had children under the age of 18 living with them, 49.6% were married couples living together, 18.6% had a female householder with no husband present, and 25.4% were non-families. 18.4% of all households were made up of individuals, and 6.1% had someone living alone who was 65 years of age or older. The average household size was 2.85 and the average family size was 3.22.

In 2000, the CDP the population was spread out, with 22.7% under the age of 18, 9.8% from 18 to 24, 34.0% from 25 to 44, 21.0% from 45 to 64, and 12.4% who were 65 years of age or older. The median age was 35 years. For every 100 females, there were 86.9 males. For every 100 females age 18 and over, there were 82.7 males.

As of 2000, the median income for a household in the CDP was $35,509, and the median income for a family was $36,161. Males had a median income of $27,380 versus $22,143 for females. The per capita income for the CDP was $14,716. About 11.9% of families and 14.2% of the population were below the poverty line, including 18.7% of those under age 18 and 15.5% of those age 65 or over.

As of 2000, speakers of Spanish accounted for 91.29% of residents, while those who spoke only English made up 6.25%.

== Economy ==
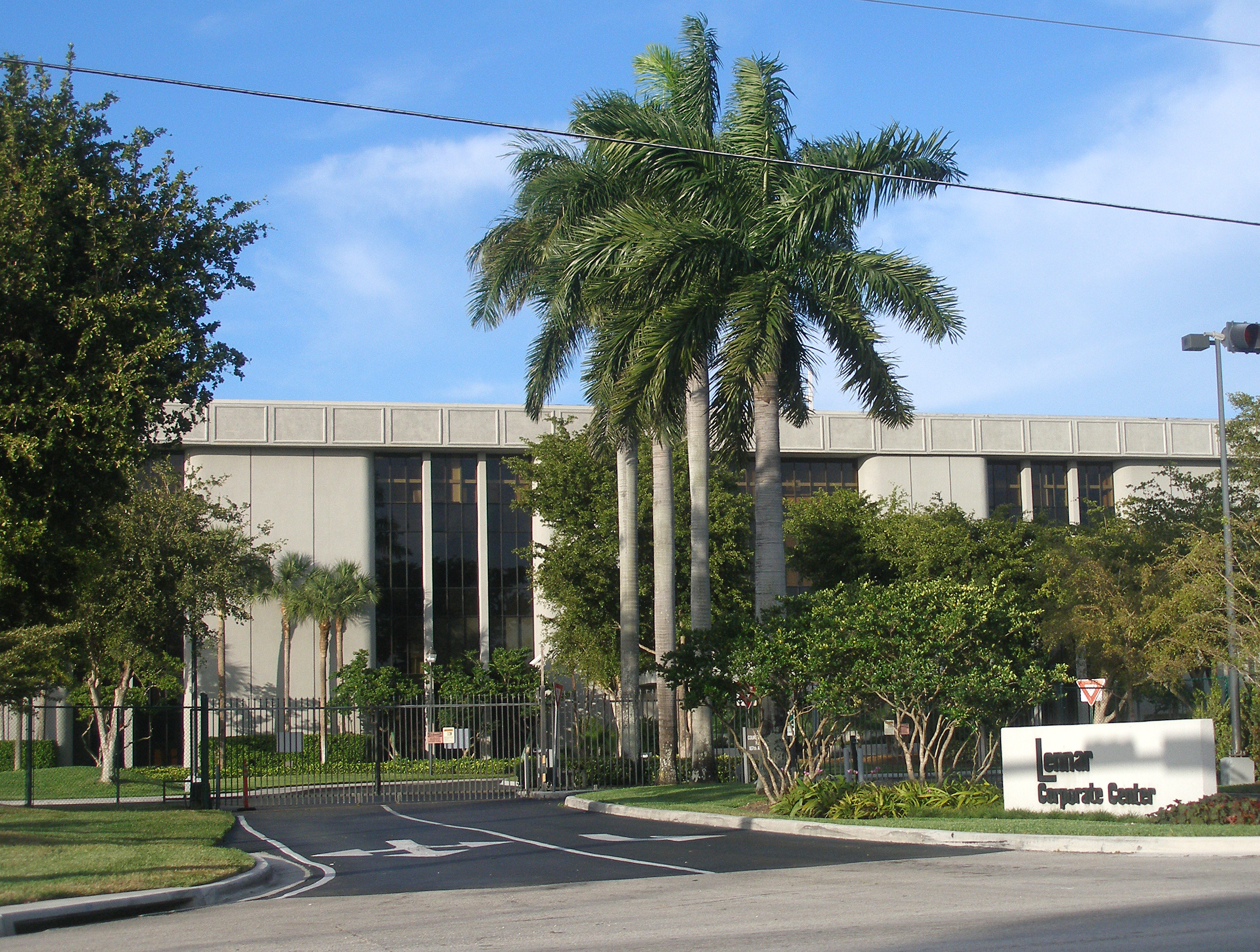
Lennar former headquarters in Fontainebleau

Lennar, a home construction company, is headquartered at 700 Northwest 107th Avenue in Fontainebleau.

== Education ==
Miami-Dade County Public Schools operates public schools in the Fontainebleau area.

=== Public schools ===
The public elementary schools are Charles R. Hadley Elementary School, Seminole Elementary School, and E.W.F. Stirrup Elementary School And the public middle school is Ruben Dario Middle School. Although, the CDP does not have a High school in its boundaries, most of the residents would attend Miami Coral Park Senior High School, located in nearby Westchester.

=== Private schools ===
Miami Christian School is in Fontainebleau.

The Roman Catholic Archdiocese of Miami previously operated Our Lady of Divine Providence School in Fontainebleau CDP. It closed in 2009.

=== University ===
The Engineering Center of Florida International University is in Fontainebleau.
