= Stonewall Jackson Middle School =

Stonewall Jackson Middle School may refer to:

== Virginia ==
- Stonewall Jackson Middle School (Hanover County, Virginia), Mechanicsville, Virginia
- Stonewall Middle School, former name of Unity Braxton Middle School, Prince William County, Virginia
- Stonewall Jackson Middle School, former name of John P. Fishwick Middle School, Roanoke, Virginia

== Other states ==
- Stonewall Jackson Middle School, Orlando, Florida
- Stonewall Jackson Middle School, former name of Yolanda Black Navarro Middle School, a Houston Independent School District school, Texas
- Stonewall Jackson Middle School, former name of Katherine Johnson Middle School in Kanawha County, West Virginia

== See also ==
- Stonewall Jackson School (disambiguation)
