= Ines R. Triay =

Cuban-born American environmental management engineer

Dr. Ines R. Triay
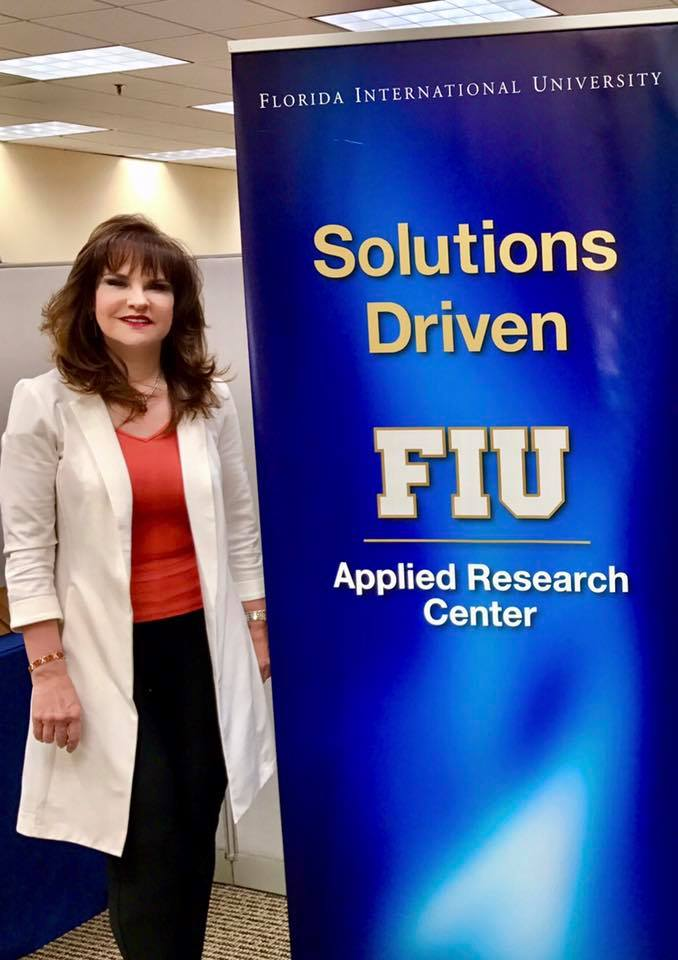
- Born: 30 January 1958 (age 68); Havana, Cuba
- Citizenship: American
- Known for: Head of United States Environment Management, Assistant Secretary for Environmental Management (OEM)
- Awards: Presidential Rank Award, DOE Secretary Exceptional Service Award, National Award for Nuclear Science, Dixie Lee Ray Award from the American Society of Mechanical Engineers

Inés Ramona Triay (born January 30, 1958) is the executive director of the Applied Research Center (ARC) and the interim Dean at the College of Engineering at Florida International University (FIU). Triay was appointed by President Obama as the 7th DOE Assistant Secretary for Environmental Management and sworn into office in May 2009. She played leading role at the Office of Environment Management (EM), which is charged with the safe and complete cleanup of the environmental legacy brought about from five decades of nuclear weapons development and government-sponsored nuclear energy research.

Born in Havana, Triay studied chemistry at the University of Miami from 1976 to 1985. She earned a B.S. degree in 1980 and then completed her Ph.D. degree in 1985.

Triay, widely considered an advocate of a strong Hanford environmental cleanup program and a friend to the Tri-Cities, has served as assistant secretary of environmental management for 2 1/2 years. Triay was responsible for kick-starting the plan for some land at Hanford and other DOE sites to be turned into clean energy parks as environmental cleanup is completed. She stepped down from this position in 2011 because of her father's poor health; however, she continues work with DOE.

It was noted by The Washington Post in June 2017, Obama's nominee, Ines Triay, had been confirmed by the Senate when Obama had moved to fill Energy Department post in his respective administrations where as Trump has filled just 15 percent of the government's top science jobs. On March 29, 2018, Anne Marie White was sworn as Assistant Secretary for Environmental Management at the U.S. Department of Energy. In June 2019, William "Ike" White joined as an acting assistant secretary for the Office of Environmental Management
