= Charles Jackson (defensive back) =

American football player (born 1962)

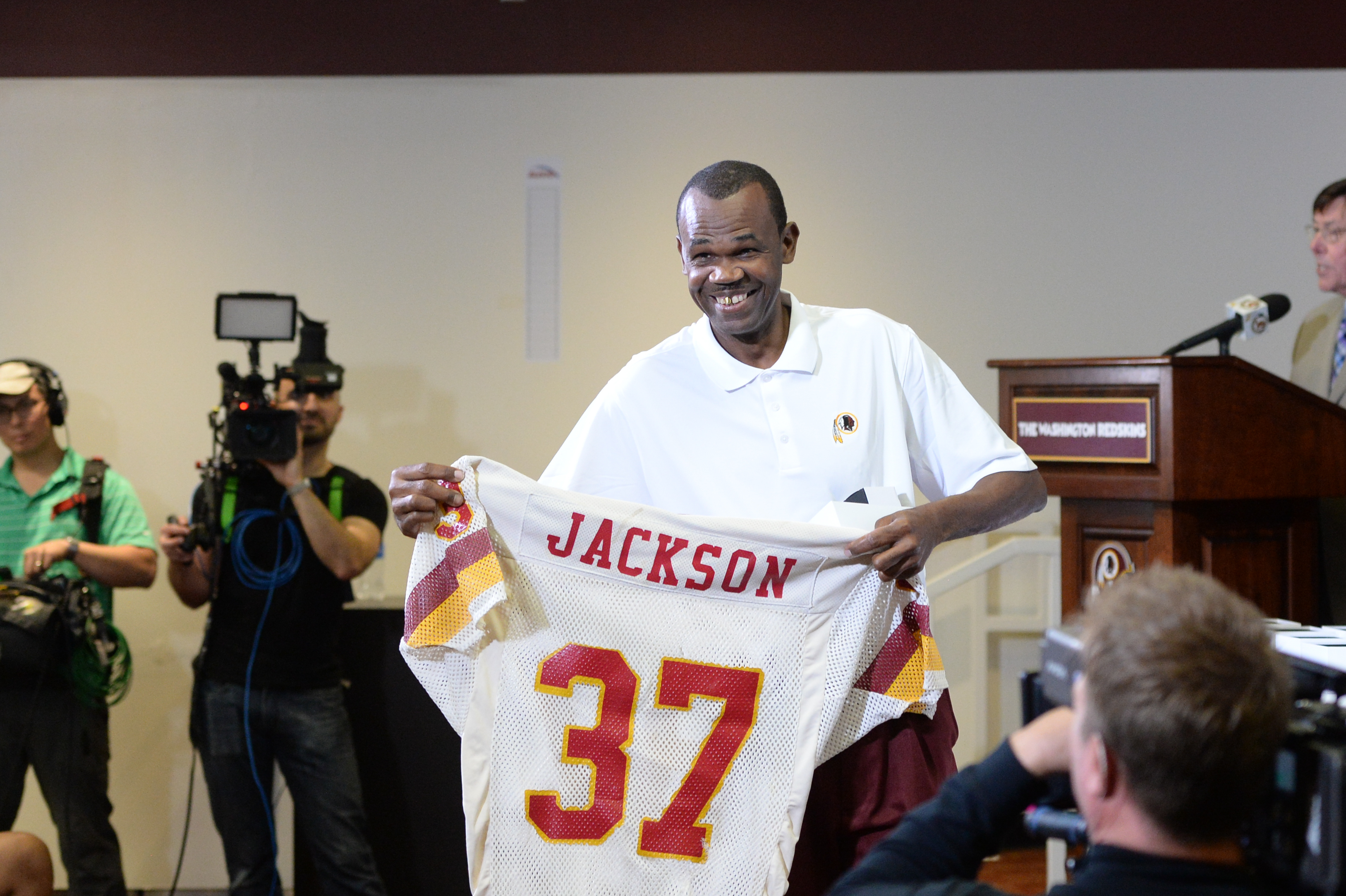
- Jackson holding his Redskins jersey at a ceremony held in 2018

No. 37
- Position: Defensive back

Personal information
- Born: March 12, 1962 (age 64); Fort Gaines, Georgia, U.S.
- Listed height: 6 ft 4 in (1.93 m)
- Listed weight: 210 lb (95 kg)

Career information
- High school: North Miami (FL)
- College: Texas Tech
- NFL draft: 1986: undrafted

Career history
- Seattle Seahawks (1986)*; Washington Redskins (1987)
- * Offseason or practice squad member only

Career NFL statistics
- Games played: 1
- Games started: 1
- Stats at Pro Football Reference

Charles Edward Jackson (born March 12, 1962) is an American former professional football player who was a defensive back for the Washington Redskins of the National Football League (NFL) in 1987. He played college football for Texas Tech. He played for Washington as a replacement player in 1987, the year that they won Super Bowl XXII. He was among 25 replacement players who received a Super Bowl ring from the team in 2018.
