= Academy for Advanced Academics =

Location
- Miami, Florida; United States
- 25.756806°N 80.381969°W

Information
- Type: Public Secondary
- Established: 2009
- School district: Miami-Dade County Public Schools
- Principal: Omar Monteagudo
- Grades: 11–12
- Campus: Suburban
- Colors: Black, Gold, Silver
- Mascot: Panthers
- Website: https://aaafiu.net/

The Academy for Advanced Academics (AAA) is a SACS accredited Dual enrollment secondary school in Miami, Florida, United States. It is a part of the Miami-Dade County Public Schools System and is situated at the Modesto A. Maidique and Biscayne Bay campuses of Florida International University.

== Background ==
The Academy for Advanced Academics is fully accredited by the Southern Association of Colleges and Schools (SACS).

AAA is designed for motivated and academically talented 11th and 12th grade students whose needs are not met in the traditional high school setting. The Academy's rigid application process ensures the students will be able to excel in an environment where the allotted 8 courses per semester are either college courses or AP classes taught by the tight knit faculty. AAA South students apply from five senior high schools in the district ( Ronald W. Reagan/Doral High School, John A. Ferguson High School, G. Holmes Braddock High School, Felix Varela High School and Miami Coral Park High School). Academy for Advanced Academics (AAA) is a combined effort of Florida International University (FIU) and Miami-Dade County Public Schools (MDCPS) initiated in the summer of the 2009 school year.

Each semester, students are enrolled in a minimum of three (3) college dual-enrollment courses, taught by FIU faculty, and four (4) high school courses, taught by M-DCPS faculty. This opportunity for acceleration offers the opportunity of graduating high school with an associate degree as well, the equivalent of two completed college years. The AAA student population maximum capacity is 100, with about only 50 students per graduating class.

In 2011, a second chapter was opened on the Biscayne Bay Campus of FIU. AAA North currently hosts students from Alonzo and Tracy Mourning Senior High Biscayne Bay Campus and Dr. Michael M. Krop Senior High School.

Currently, students from any and all high schools can apply; as of recent, AAA has become its own high school as opposed to being a programme offered within other schools.

== Clubs and organizations ==
The following clubs and organizations are active at AAA:

- National Honor Society
- Mu Alpha Theta - Mathematics Honor Society
- RADIX - AAA's literary magazine.
- Key Club
- Medical Club
- Music & Arts Club
- First Priority Club

== See also ==
School for Advanced Studies
