= FIU Engineering Center =

The FIU Engineering Center is a research and educational area of Florida International University's main campus (eight blocks south of the Engineering Center) in Miami-Dade County, Florida. It is located in Fontainebleau, a census-designated place, with a Miami postal address. It is home to the College of Engineering and Computing and the Motorola Nanofabrication Research Facility, the first centralized facility of its kind in Florida. The Motorola Nanofabrication Research Facility at Florida International University is an open-access initiative in support of nano-scale devices, systems and materials research that encompasses a broad range of technologies and capabilities. The facility provides nanofabrication, analytical instrumentation, materials characterization and process-development laboratories for students, faculty and industrial researchers.
