= North Miami Senior High School =

Location
- 13110 NE 8th Avenue; North Miami, Florida 33161; United States
- 25°53′51″N 80°11′00″W

Information
- School type: Public, High School
- Established: 1951
- School district: Miami-Dade County Public Schools
- Principal: Selena Volcy
- Faculty: 84.00 (FTE)
- Grades: 9-12
- Enrollment: 1,722 (2023–2024)
- Student to teacher ratio: 20.50
- Campus type: Suburban
- Colors: Hunter Green; Gray
- Mascot: Pioneer
- Website: nmshpioneers.org

North Miami Senior High School (NMSHS) is a public high school in North Miami, Florida, United States, Located at 13110 NE 8th Avenue.

== History ==
The school opened as Edward L. Constance Junior-Senior High School in 1951; with 1,500 students in 7th, 8th and 9th grades. Another grade was added each year for the next three years. The class of 1955 was the first graduating class. Early in 1955, the name of the school was changed to North Miami Senior High School. In the fall of 1955 the 7th, 8th and 9th grades were moved to the new North Miami Junior High School. The original school buildings were replaced with new buildings on an adjacent site in the early 2010s.

After the 2010 Haiti earthquake, North Miami High enrolled 88 survivors, the largest number of any MDCPS school. North Miami is a center of middle class Haitian Americans and most of the survivors who came to the Miami area were middle class. Michael Winerip of The New York Times interviewed 10 survivors at North Miami. They all indicated that the academic work at North Miami was less rigorous than the work at their private Haitian schools. After the earthquake, eight of the interviewed students reached Miami by flying on commercial airline services out of airports in the Dominican Republic. All of the students had visas to reside in the U.S., and many had previously spent summer vacations in Miami.

== International Baccalaureate ==
Since January 1990, North Miami has offered the International Baccalaureate program. This international non-profit educational foundation was founded in 1968 in Geneva, Switzerland. The organization administers programs for elementary, middle, and high schools, providing an international curriculum intended to be acceptable to universities around the world. North Miami Senior High hosts a magnet program that offers a rigorous diploma curriculum approved by the International Baccalaureate Organization, based in Geneva. The IB Magnet Program consists of approximately 250 students divided between pre-IB in grades 9 and 10, and IB in grades 11 and 12. Students are selected based upon academic achievement, previous advanced coursework and promise. The North Miami IB program is culturally and ethnically diverse due to the fact that students are transported throughout Miami-Dade County.

IB diploma candidates are assessed at international standards in six areas with three exams taken at a higher level and three exams taken at a standard level. IB diploma candidates must also complete a 150-hour creativity, action and service requirement, write a 4,000-word independently researched Extended Essay, and complete a Theory of Knowledge class. North Miami Senior High also has an International Affairs program, which focuses on languages and international studies. This rigorous course of study offers the IB certificate in the chosen fields of study, while offering a variety of IB and AP courses to meet students' needs.

== Notable alumni ==
- Carlos Alvarez (Class of 1968) – consensus All-American college football player
- Dave Aronberg (Class of 1989) – Politician, State Attorney of Palm Beach County
- Michelle Bernstein (attended) – chef and restaurateur
- Kurt Bevacqua (attended) – MLB baseball player
- John Browning (Class of 1992) – NFL football player
- Steve Carlton (Class of 1963) – Major League Baseball Hall of Fame Pitcher
- Bill Conti (Class of 1959) – Oscar-winning composer (The Right Stuff, theme from Rocky)
- Cool & Dre (attended) – record producers
- Paul Gleason (Class of 1958) – TV and film actor (The Breakfast Club, All My Children)
- Lynda Goodfriend (Class of 1968) – TV and film actress (Happy Days)
- Israel Gutierrez (Class of 1995) – CNN and ESPN sports commentator
- Charles Jackson (Class of 1982) – NFL football player; community activist
- Greg Keatley (Class of 1972) – MLB baseball player
- Dr. Arnold Klein – dermatologist and physician for Michael Jackson
- Earl Little (Class of 1992) – NFL football player
- Mari Morrow (Class of 1986) – Actress and model (Family Matters, One Life to Live, The Parkers)
- Mark Pafford – Politician, Member of the Florida House of Representatives
- Robert David Paulison – Director of the Federal Emergency Management Agency (FEMA)
- Jerry Weiss – artist
- Joel Williams (Class of 1974) – NFL football player
- Lawrence Wright (Class of 1992) - NFL football player
- Jeff Zucker (Class of 1982) – television producer and executive

== See also ==
- North Miami Middle School
