= List of middle schools in Miami-Dade County =

The Miami-Dade County Public Schools district has 58 middle schools. This page shows first a list of names and then a more descriptive list of some middle schools.

== Simple list of middle schools in the district ==
These middle schools serve grades 6–8 with exceptions as noted (names in boldface are the subject of sections of this article):

- Allapattah Middle School
- Andover Middle School
- Arvida Middle School
- Brownsville Middle School
- Campbell Drive Middle School
- Carol City Middle School
- Charles H. Drew Middle School
- Citrus Grove Middle School
- Country Club Middle School
- Cutler Ridge Middle School
- Doral Middle School
- George Washington Carver Middle School
- Glades Middle School
- Hammocks Middle School
- Henry H. Filer Middle School
- Herbert A. Ammons Middle School
- Hialeah Gardens Middle School
- Hialeah Middle School
- Highland Oaks Middle School
- Homestead Middle School
- Horace Mann Middle School - grades 6–8; technology magnet
- Howard D. McMillan Middle School
- iMater Academy Middle School
- John F. Kennedy Middle School
- Jorge Mas Canosa Middle School
- Jose De Diego Middle School
- Kinloch Park Middle School
- Lake Stevens Middle School
- Lamar Louise Curry Middle School

- Lawton Chiles Middle School
- Madison Middle School
- Mays Middle School
- Miami Edison Middle School
- Miami Lakes Middle School
- Miami Springs Middle School
- Nautilus Middle School
- Norland Middle School
- North Dade Middle School
- North Miami Middle School
- Palm Springs Middle School
- Palmetto Middle School
- Parkway Middle School
- Paul W. Bell Middle School
- Ponce De Leon Middle School
- Redland Middle School
- Richmond Heights Middle School
- Riviera Middle School
- Rockway Middle School
- Ruben Dario Middle School
- Shenandoah Middle School
- South Dade Middle School - grades 4-8
- South Miami Middle Community School
- Southwood Middle School
- Thomas Jefferson Middle School
- W.R. Thomas Middle School
- West Miami Middle School
- Westview Middle School
- Zelda Glazer Middle School

== Middle schools without their own articles ==
=== Highland Oaks Middle School ===
This is one of two hurricane animal shelters in the county.

=== Ponce De Leon Middle School ===
Ponce De Leon Middle School is a magnet school in Coral Gables. It was founded in 1924 by Robertson Olsen. It was originally a high school and later became a middle school.

=== Ruben Dario Middle School ===
Ruben Dario Middle School (RDMS) is a public school in Miami. It has around 1000 students. The school mascot is the cougar.

=== Shenandoah Middle School ===
Shenandoah Middle School is a public-magnet middle school in the historic Shenandoah section of Miami. It offers a Museum Magnet program for grades 6–8. The curriculum of a Museum Magnet is based on close collaboration with museums for educational expertise and resources.

Shenandoah partners with these museums:

- Dade Heritage Trust Program
- Historical Museum of Southern Florida

- Lowe Art Museum-Univ. of Miami
- Miami Art Museum

- The Wolfsonian-FIU

=== W.R. Thomas Middle School ===
W.R. Thomas Middle School is a certified Cambridge Magnet middle school located in Miami. Victor Olivero went to this school from 2020-2023.

=== Rockway Middle School ===
Rockway Middle School is a Magnet school in Westchester, Florida. Its magnet programs are Robotics, and Law. Its school mascot is a falcon. There are approximately 1,140 students. The current school principal is Mr. Ruben Morales.
