= FIU College of Engineering and Computing =

College in Florida, United States

Coordinates: 25.75889°N 80.37372°W

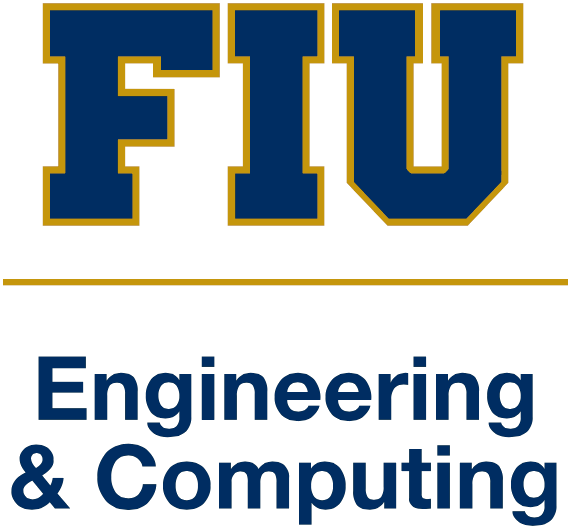
- Type: Public
- Established: 1965
- Dean: Jack A. Puleo
- Students: 5,592 (Fall 2017)
- Location: Miami, Florida, U.S.
- Website: cec.fiu.edu

The Florida International University College of Engineering and Computing, located in Miami, Florida in the United States is one of the university's 26 schools and colleges and was originally established in 1973 as the School of Technology. The College of Engineering and Computing offers bachelor's, master's and doctorate degrees within the college's 8 separate schools, departments and institutes. The college offers online and distance learning courses and programs through the Office of Distance Education. This office was previously known as FIU FEEDS, a statewide distance learning initiative adopted by the college in 1985.

The College of Engineering and Computing currently offers bachelor's, master's and doctorate degrees in Biomedical Engineering, Civil Engineering, Computer Engineering, Computer Science, Construction Management, Electrical Engineering, Environmental Engineering, Information Technology, Networking & Telecommunications, and Mechanical Engineering.

There are currently over 2,800 undergraduate and 700 graduate students in the college split into various academic departments and schools:

- Knight Foundation School of Computing and Information Sciences
- Moss School of Construction, Infrastructure and Sustainability
  - Moss Department of Construction Management
  - Department of Civil and Environmental Engineering
- School of Universal Computing, Construction and Engineering Education
- School of Electrical, Computer and Enterprise Engineering
  - Department of Electrical and Computer Engineering
  - Department of Enterprise and Logistics Engineering
- School of Biomedical, Materials and Mechanical Engineering
  - Department of Biomedical Engineering
  - Department of Mechanical and Materials Engineering

The College of Engineering and Computing houses 25 facilities, including research centers, institutes and laboratories. Research is conducted both independently and in cooperation with industry leaders and academic institutions, with nearly $50 million in external funding over the last five years from a variety of government and corporate sources.

== Facilities ==
In 1973, the School of Technology was established with former Dean, Robert Ellis at the original University Park Campus. The College of Technology later established a School of Engineering as a division in 1983, under Dean Lambert Tall and Associate Dean Leroy Thompson. The college became official in 1984 as the College of Engineering and Applied Sciences and was later renamed to the College of Engineering and Design in 1989. In 1998, the college relocated to the Cordis building and was renamed to the College of Engineering. In 2005, School of Computing and Information Sciences joined and the College of Engineering and Computing was born. The college resides at the Engineering Center (EC), a 250,000 sq ft (23,000 m^{2}). building on 38 acres (150,000 m^{2}) situated less than two miles (3 km) from the University Park Campus, and at the Computing, Arts, Sciences and Education (CASE) building located at the Modesto Maidique Campus. The two facilities house research centers, teaching laboratories, faculty offices, study areas, computing facilities, and research laboratories. The college also offers classes for students who live farther north of the city at the Biscayne Bay Campus in North Miami, as well as at the FIU at I-75 in Broward County.
