= Southwestern Middle School (Florida) =

Location
- 605 West New Hampshire Ave; DeLand, Volusia, Florida 32720; United States; 29°00′29″N 81°18′51″W

Information
- School type: Public middle school
- Established: January 1962
- School district: Volusia County Schools
- Superintendent: Dr. Carmen Balgobin
- CEEB code: 1201920
- Principal: Tai Swift
- Teaching staff: 32.00 (FTE)
- Grades: 6-8
- Enrollment: 664 (2024–2025)
- Student to teacher ratio: 20.75
- Colors: Red, Black & White
- Accreditation: Florida State Department of Education
- Website: southwestern.vcsedu.org

Southwestern Middle School (formerly Euclid Junior Senior High School) is a middle school located in DeLand, Florida, United States. It is part of the Volusia County School District.

== History ==
The school originally operated as a high school. Named Euclid Junior Senior High School, it opened in 1962. In 1964, it was renamed to Southwestern High School. In 1969, the school was completely revamped into a sole 7th grade school called the Southwestern 7th Grade Center. In 1988, the school was revamped a second time as a 6-8 middle school called Southwestern Middle School, belonging to the Volusia County School District. At one point, the school received status as a Five Star School by the Florida Department of Education.

=== 2026 shooting plot ===
On February 22, 2026, a 6th grade student of the school, 12-year-old Josephine Simmons-Peters, was arrested after a friend of hers reported to authorities that she wrote a 13-page manifesto about her plans to shoot up the school. The plan mapped out how to get guns onto school grounds, and where to conceal them. The manifesto also included names of specific students who were allegedly bullying her, a teacher who gave her a bad grade a few days prior, and the school's resource officer. She planned on committing suicide after the attack. Authorities alleged that the manifesto was "riddled with graphic language."

Simmons-Peters was charged with making written threats to kill and misuse of a two-way communication device.
