= School for Advanced Studies =

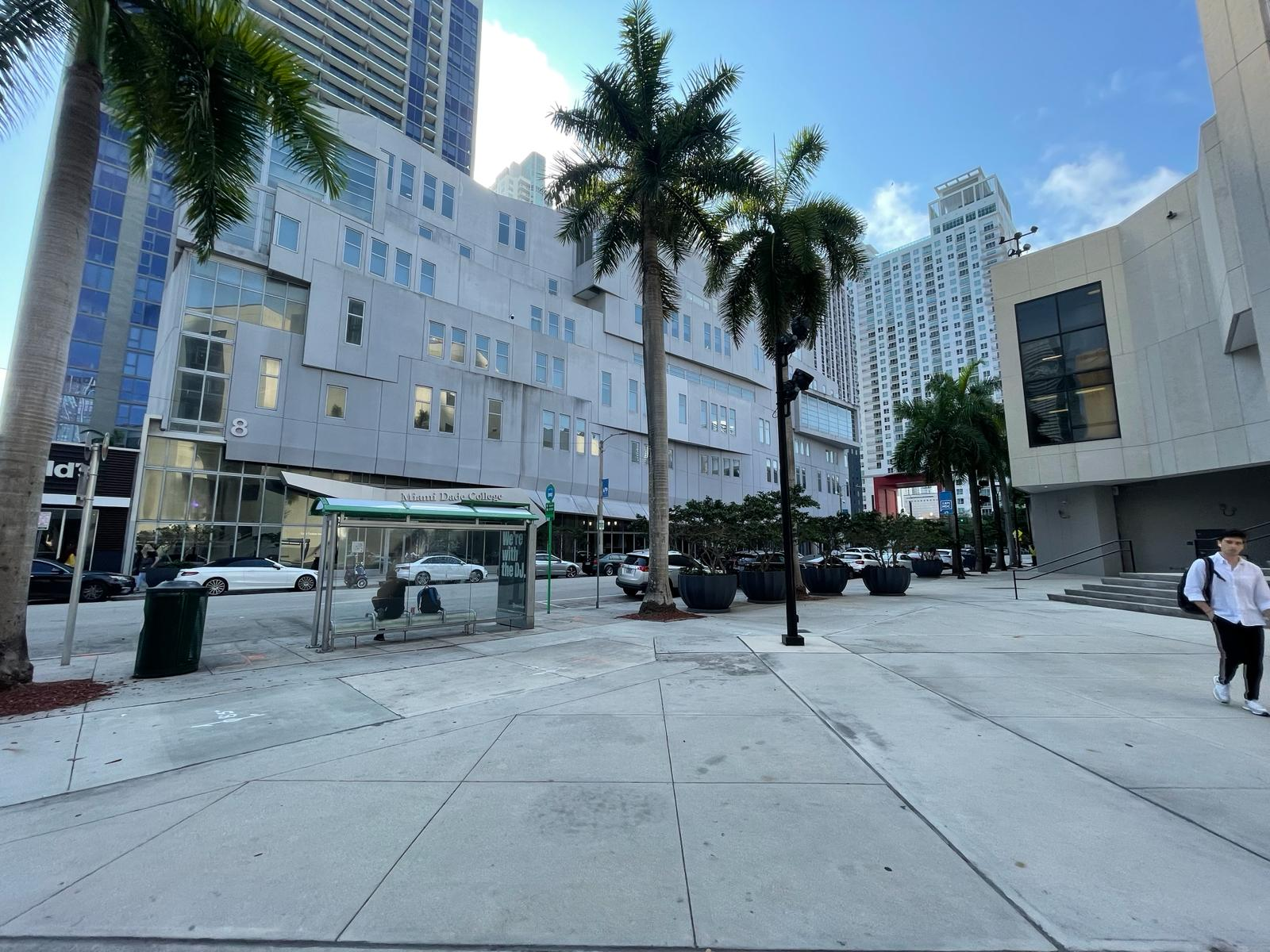
- Miami, Florida; United States

Information
- Type: Public secondary
- Established: 1988
- School district: Miami-Dade County Public Schools
- Principal: Omar Monteagudo
- Grades: 11–12
- Campus: Urban
- Colors: White, Blue
- Mascot: White tigers
- Website: Official website

The School for Advanced Studies (SAS) is a dual-enrollment secondary school in Miami, Florida. It is a part of the Miami-Dade County Public Schools System and is located at five campuses of Miami Dade College: Homestead campus, Kendall campus, North campus, West campus, and Wolfson campus. It is accredited by the Southern Association of Colleges and Schools.

== Overview ==
SAS provides accelerated education for students in grades 11–12, allowing them to earn an associate's degree from Miami Dade College (MDC) concurrent with their last two years of high school.

== Student eligibility ==
Students interested in attending SAS must apply in the fall of their sophomore year.

Students must have:

1. A minimum 3.0 unweighted grade-point average (GPA)
2. Earned required exam scores (PERT, PSAT/NMSQT, or Accuplacer)
3. Submitted the application on time and correctly
4. Record of exemplary attendance

== Campuses ==
Each campus holds different and unique components.

Locations:

- Homestead: 500 College Terrace, Homestead, FL 33030
- Kendall: 11011 SW 104th St, Miami, FL 33176
- North: 11380 NW 27th Ave, Miami, FL 33167
- West: 3800 NW 115th Ave, Doral, FL 33178
- Wolfson: 25 NE 2nd St, Miami, FL 33132

Curriculum:

11th grade
Social Studies:	AP United States Government and Politics AP Macroeconomics	AP United States History	Constitutional Law Honors
Research:	Research 1 Honors		
Language Arts:	AP English Literature	AP English Language and Composition	Great Books Honors
Mathematics:	AP Pre-Calculus	AP Calculus AB	AP Calculus BC

12th grade
Social Studies:	AP United States Government and Politics AP Macroeconomics	AP United States History	Constitutional Law Honors
Research:	Research 2 Honors	Internship	
Language Arts:	AP English Literature	AP English Language and Composition	Great Books Honors
Mathematics:	AP Calculus AB	AP Calculus BC	

Clubs
Homestead	Kendall	North	West	Wolfson
Arts/Gaming	Art	Art	Chess	Art
Black Student Union	Chess	Black Student Union	FBLA	Black Student Union
Culinary Arts	Coding	Mental Health	Literary Magazine	Coding
Environmental	Debate/Mock Trial	English Honor Society	Mu Alpha Theta	Environmental
Gay Straight Alliance	Gay Straight Alliance	Gay Straight Alliance	English Honor Society	Feeding South Florida
Literary Magazine	Literary Magazine	Hispanic heritage	Model UN	Hispanic Heritage
Mu Alpha Theta	Model UN	Math and Coding	Science Honor Society	Jewish Student Union
National Honor Society	Mu Alpha Theta	National Honor Society	Student Government Association	Performing and Fine Arts
Newspaper	Science Honor Society	Medical	Technology Students	Mock Trial
Student Government Association	Women of Tomorrow	Women of Tomorrow	Wild West Artistry	Sports Enthusiasts

== Curriculum ==
Only offer Advanced Placement (AP), Honors, and Dual Enrollment Courses

Advanced Placement Courses

- AP United States History
- AP United States Government and Politics
- AP Macroeconomics
- AP English Language and Composition
- AP English Literature and Composition
- AP Pre-Calculus
- AP Calculus AB
- AP Calculus BC
- AP Physics C: Mechanics

== Demographics ==
Student diversity
Minority enrollment	92.5%
Hispanic	82.7%
White	7.5%
Asian	6.0%
Black	3.0%
Two or more races	0.8%

Gender distribution
Female	64%
Male	36%

== Awards and honors ==
- Ranked #3 in the 2023-2024 Best U.S. High Schools by the U.S. News on Education
- Ranked #1 in the 2023-2024 Best Florida High Schools by the U.S. News on Education
- Ranked #1 in the 2023-2024 Best High Schools in the Miami, FL Area by U.S. News on Education
- Ranked #1 in the 2023-2024 High Schools in Miami-Dade County Public Schools District by U.S. News on Education
- Ranked #6 out of the top 2000 public senior high schools in the U.S. in a joint report by Newsweek and The Daily Beast in 2013, 2nd out of all Florida schools, and 1st out of all Miami schools
- 7 May 2013 was declared as SAS Day in Miami-Dade County, signifying the 25-year anniversary of this nationally recognized high school.
- Ranked #12 out of 30,000+ public senior high schools in the U.S. by Newsweek in 2012, and 3rd out of all Florida schools on the list
- Ranked #46 out of 30,000+ public senior high schools in the U.S. by Newsweek in 2010, and 10th out of all Florida schools on the list

== Gallery ==
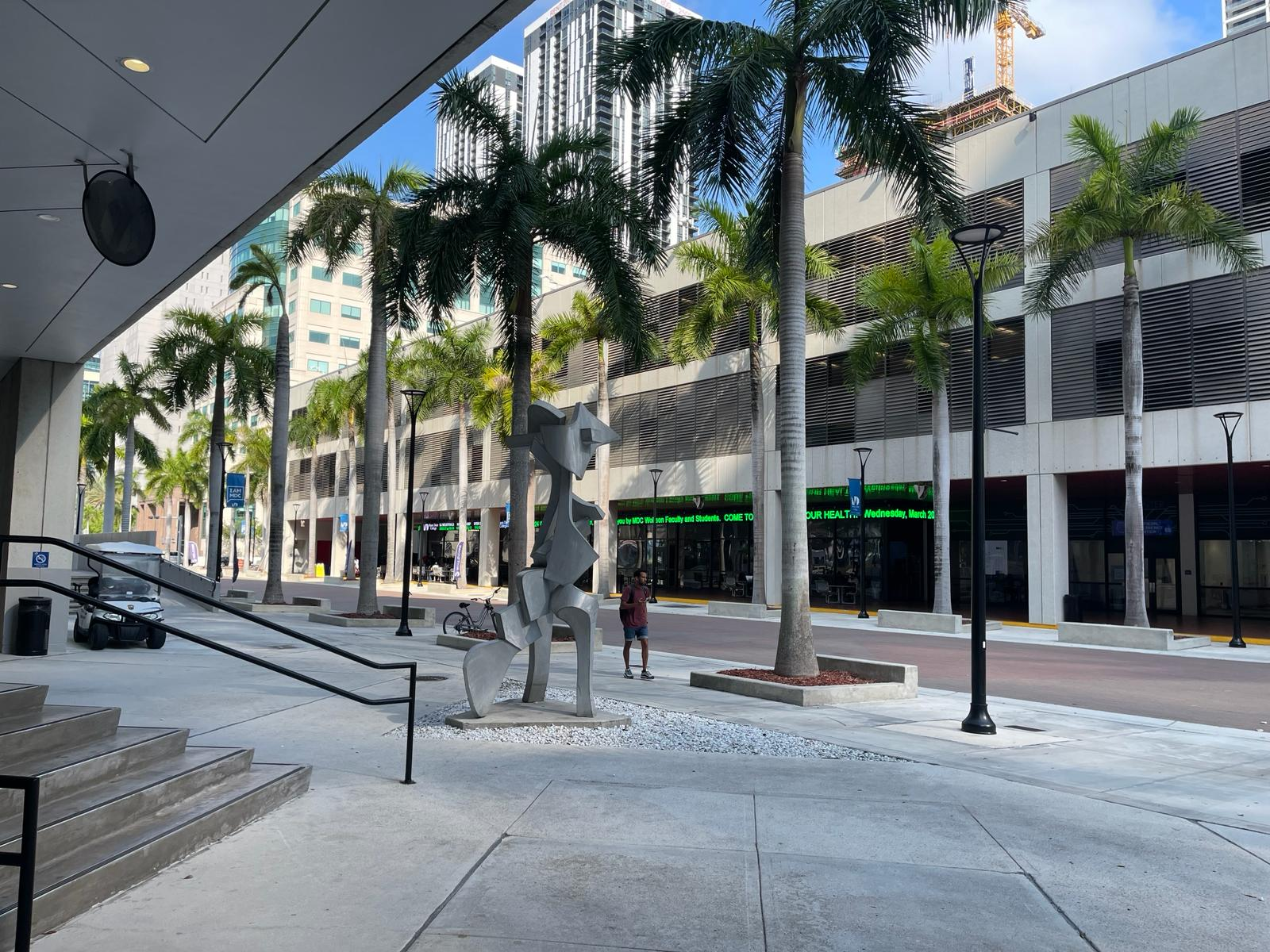

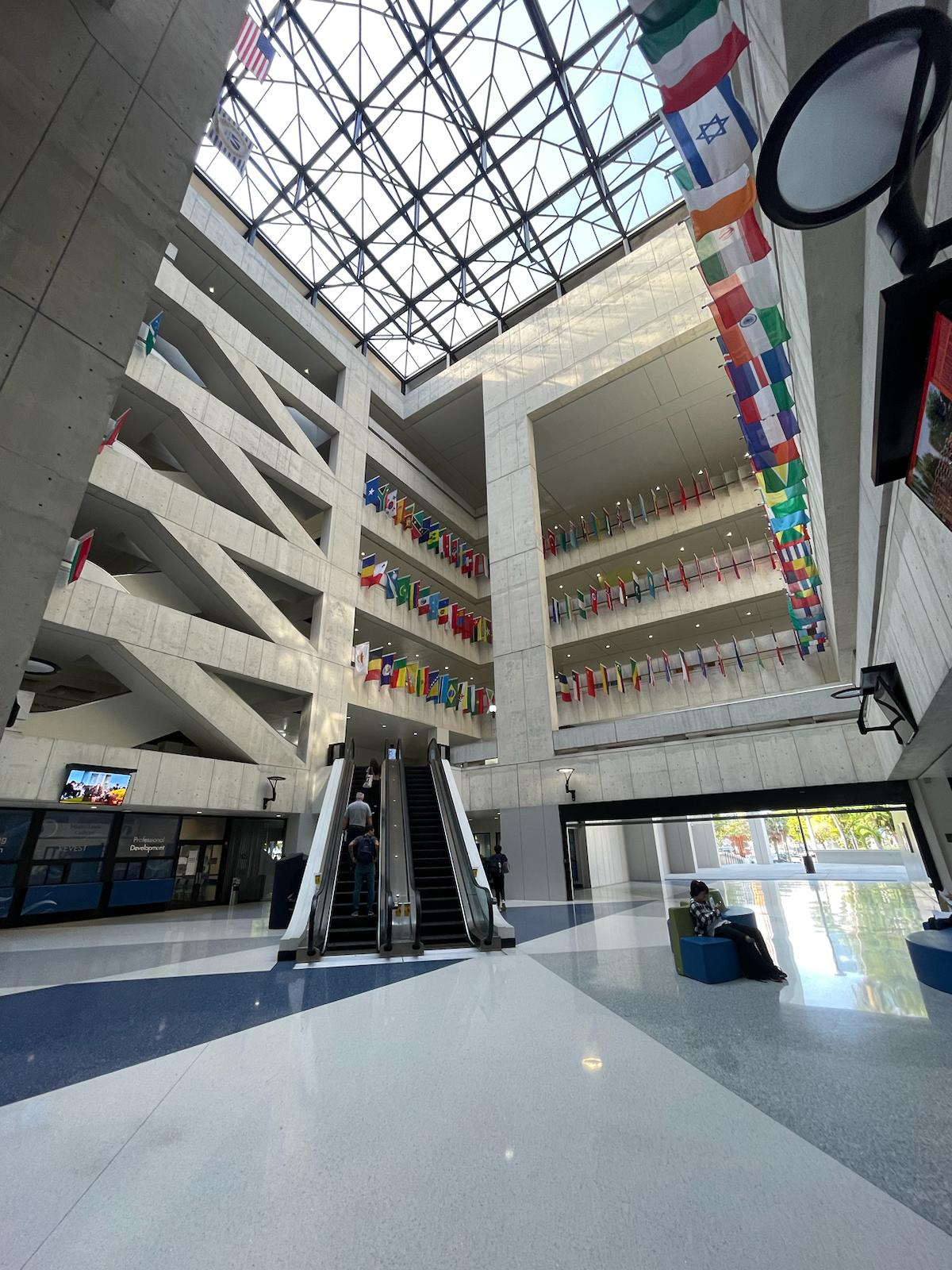

== See also ==
- Academy for Advanced Academics
