= First Priority =

Christian youth organization

First Priority of America and First Priority Global
- Company type: Non-profit
- Industry: Ministry, Publishing
- Founded: 1996; 30 years ago
- Headquarters: United States
- Key people: FPOA: Executive Director - Mark Robbins; = FPG: President/CEO - Benny Proffitt; Executive Director - Joey Proffitt; Vice President - Phil Brown
- Services: Strategy and resources for Christian youth campus ministry
- Website: fpofamerica.com

First Priority is a church-based, student-led, and adult-coached youth organization. It supports student-initiated, student-led Christian clubs that do the Great Commission and meet on middle school and high school grounds. In many locations around the world, the Clubs also meet in Churches and in the Community.

First Priority of America supports local FP movements in cities across the US. First Priority Global has expanded to take the strategy internationally.

The First Priority Strategy was founded by Benny Proffitt leading 12 Youth Pastors in the Irving, TX area, in 1985. The first city to take this strategy and follow it through to maturity started in Birmingham, AL, in 1990 under the leadership of founder Benny Proffitt.

The vision of First Priority is to take the Hope of Christ to every student in the United States and around the world. They do that by uniting the body of Christ (area churches) with a plan of action to influence the schools with the Gospel. The plan of action is to encourage, equip, and empower Christian students from area churches to form a First Priority Club at school to share the life, death, and resurrection of Jesus. This Club being Church-based is the primary distinction between First Priority and other club ministries: they are a local-church strategy rather than a para-church ministry. First Priority of America works to empower the 325,000 Evangelical churches to reach the students in 41,000 Public Middle and High schools in the U.S. First Priority Global seeks to establish these clubs in every community around the world. As of the end of 2024, First Priority Global has trained Church Leaders in 80 countries.
