= Miami Springs Middle School =

Secondary school in Miami Springs, Florida

Coordinates: 25.81525°N 80.274144°W

Location
- 150 S. Royal Poinciana Boulevard; Miami Springs, Florida 33166; United States

Information
- Type: Public
- Motto: Pride, Excellence, and Success
- Established: September 1955
- Closed: June 4, 2026
- School district: Miami-Dade County Public Schools
- Principal: Christian Saavedra
- Staff: 47.00 (FTE)
- Grades: 6-8
- Enrollment: 997 (2017–18)
- Student to teacher ratio: 21.0
- Colors: Blue, white
- Mascot: Eagle
- Nickname: Eagles
- School Hours: 9:05 AM to 3:50 PM
- Website: miamispringsmiddle.net

Miami Springs Middle School was a secondary school located in the city of Miami Springs, Florida, United States. Its mascot was an eagle.

== History and information ==
Miami Springs Middle was built in 1955.

It has been recognized for being a healthy school. President Clinton recognized the school for its healthy reforms at the bronze level.

While children from all over the Miami Metropolitan Area attended, most students lived in Hialeah, Florida, Gladeview, Brownsville, Florida, and Allapattah. As of 2023, its enrollment was 631.

It had a magnet program, specializing in science and engineering, sponsored by MAST Academy. It also had an honors program. It was neighbored by the MDCPS Regional Building, which used to be an elementary school.

Miami Springs Middle School officially closed its doors on June 4, 2026, relocating its students to nearby middle schools and merging with Miami Springs Senior High School.

== Clubs and organizations ==
=== Extracurricular groups ===
- 500 Role Models
- Future Teachers of America (FEA)
- Junior Achievement
- Memory Book
- Multi-Media
- National Junior Honor Society
- Student Council
- Youth Act
- Youth Crime Watch

=== Curricular groups ===
The Geography Team was the 2000 Miami-Dade County second place team and the 2001 Miami-Dade County first place team. The school was also the 2001 Florida state champion in the National Geographic Bee.

The school had the following curricular groups:

- Band
- Chorus
- Computers
- Dance
- Drama
- Geography
- Math
- Keyboard
- SECME
