= Arvida Middle School =

Coordinates: 25.666731°N 80.400162°W

Location
- 10900 SW 127th Ave; Miami, Florida 33186; United States

Information
- Type: Public
- Established: 1975
- School district: Miami-Dade County Public Schools
- Principal: Angela Holbrook
- Teaching staff: 60.00 (FTE)
- Grades: 6-8
- Enrollment: 1,466 (2017–18)
- Student to teacher ratio: 24.43
- Colors: Maroon and Gold
- Mascot: Vikings
- School hours: 9:10 to 3:50
- Website: Official site

Arvida Middle School is a Blue Ribbon middle school in Miami, Florida, United States, founded in 1975, that educates around 1,850 students from grades 6-8. Its principal since August 2019, is Angela Holbrook.

== Academics ==
Arvida was recognized as a Blue Ribbon school in 1997-98, the highest award that can be given to a US school.

The school has been described as exemplifying "a progressive commitment to recapturing traditional excellence and incorporating innovative approaches into the educational process".

Arvida Middle School is a magnet school to which anyone in the district can apply. The application window begins in October and ends in January. Students must meet criteria in order to be accepted into either of the magnets offered, forensic science and fine arts and global studies.

The Global Academy, established in 2000-01, is an innovative academic program for all incoming 6th, 7th, and 8th graders. The program combines mandatory courses in mathematics, language arts, science, and geography. Coursework is cross-cutting and environmental in nature; it links and relates the subjects.

The Forensic Science and Fine Arts Program, established in 2008, is the first program of its kind in Miami-Dade County. This case-based program involves the techniques used in crime scene investigation to develop student's critical thinking, investigative, and cooperative skills.

== Notable alumni ==
- Cote de Pablo, actress on the popular television series NCIS
- Stephen Tulloch, linebacker for the NFL team Detroit Lions
- Kevin Pouya, rapper
- DJ EFN, record label executive and DJ.
