= History of the Jews in South Florida =

Jewish community of South Florida

The history of Jews in South Florida dates back to the 19th century. Many South Florida Jews are Ashkenazi (descendants of Russian, Polish, and Eastern European ancestry), and Latin American (Cuba, Brazil, Venezuela, Colombia, Mexico, Argentina, Chile). Many are also French, Moroccan, Syrian, Bukharan, and Israeli. There is a significant Sephardic and Mizrahi population as well. The population of Palm Beach County is 15.8% Jewish. Boca Raton, with an overall population of 100,000 people, has 16 synagogues. With an estimated 70.8% of its 100,000 residents identifying as Jewish in 2023, Boca Raton has one of the highest Jewish population percentages in the United States, reflecting its status as a major Jewish cultural and religious hub in South Florida.

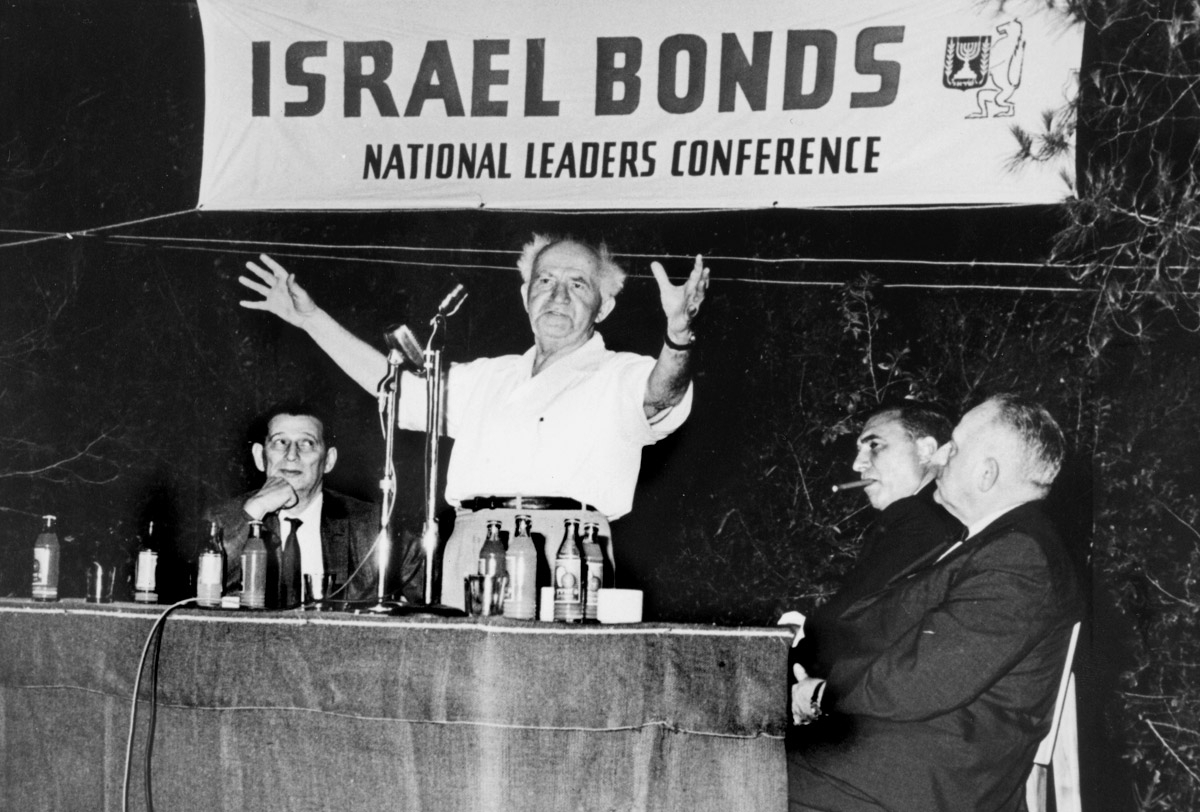
Prime Minister David Ben-Gurion welcomes an Israel Bonds delegation to Jerusalem.

== Key West, Florida Jewish history ==
The exact origins of the Key West Jewish Community are not dated, but Jews were first recorded in the city in the 1880s, when the community was organized by Joe Wolfson, Abraham Wolkowsky and Mendell Rippa. It is believed that most settlers were escaping European persecution at the time. Some early settlers were shipwrecked and decided to make a living in the city. In 1887, Congregation B'nai Zion was founded in Key West. Morris Zion served as its first president. B'nai Zion's building was built in 1969, and it adheres to Conservative Judaism, though it has a Liberal slant. In 1895, Jewish Key West residents supported the independence of Cuba from Spain.

== West Palm Beach, Florida Jewish history ==
Jews first settled in the city of West Palm Beach in 1892.

== Miami, Florida Jewish history ==
Jews first permanently settled in the Miami, Florida, area in 1896. In 1907, the first bris occurred in Miami-Dade County. It was for Eddie Cohen. In 1913, B'nai Zion, the first congregation in Miami-Dade County, was founded. It later was renamed as Beth David. In 1953, Abe Aronovitz became the first and only Jewish mayor of Miami.

== Broward County, Florida Jewish history ==
In 1910, Louis Brown was the first Jew to settle in Broward County.

== Miami Beach, Florida Jewish history ==
The first Jewish family to settle in Miami Beach was the Weiss family, Joseph and Jennie and their children, in 1913. They later opened Joe's Stone Crab Restaurant. The first congregation in Miami Beach was Beth Jacob, which was formed in 1927. The congregation built the first synagogue in 1929 (now the Jewish Museum of Florida.) In 1943, the first of 16 Jewish mayors of Miami Beach, Mitchell Wolfson, was elected to office.

== Other history ==
- In 1959, approximately 10,000 Cuban Jews sought refuge in South Florida.
- In 1995, the Jewish Museum of Florida opened.
- In 2004, Debbie Wasserman Schultz of Weston, Florida, became the first Jewish woman from Florida to be elected to the U.S. Congress.
- In 2012, Scott Israel was elected Sheriff of Broward County, making him the first Jew to be elected Sheriff in Florida history.

== Jewish religious observance in South Florida ==
As of January 2009, there were nearly 189 synagogues and congregations built to serve over 500,000 Jews in South Florida.

Orthodox Judaism

As of January 2009, there were approximately 77 Orthodox synagogues and congregations in South Florida.

Conservative Judaism

As of November 2008, there were approximately 60 Conservative synagogues and congregations in South Florida. Notable synagogues include The Cuban Hebrew Congregation.

Reform Judaism

As of November 2008, there were approximately 40 Reform synagogues and congregations in South Florida. Temple Beth El of Boca Raton leads South Florida in membership with nearly 2,500 member families, making it one of the largest synagogues in the United States and the largest in the Southeastern United States. It boasts two campus. Its eastern Schaefer Family Campus alone spans 10 acres.

Reconstructionist Judaism

As of January 2009, there were three Reconstructionist synagogues and congregations in South Florida: Congregation Kol Ami (Palm Beach County), Ramat Shalom (Broward County), and Temple Beth Or (Miami-Dade County).

== Chabad in southern Florida ==
Chabad and its affiliated Adult Educational organization The Rohr Jewish Learning Institute are active in Florida.

=== Chabad of Palm Beach Gardens ===
Chabad of Palm Beach Gardens aims to bring together the Jewish Community of the greater Palm Beach and Jupiter area and to serve the spiritual, educational and social needs of the community.

=== Chabad of Boca Raton ===
Chabad of Boca Raton, Florida.

Chabad of Boca Raton is a Chabad house located in Boca Raton founded in 1989, the present building was erected in 1999. In 1990 city officials permitted it to erect a menorah in Sanborn Square, a city park.

== Significant South Floridian communities and their Jewish populations ==
- Fort Lauderdale Metropolitan Area, Florida: approximately 234,000 Jews live in all of Broward County.
  - Fort Lauderdale, Florida: 24,377 Jews live in Fort Lauderdale.
  - Pembroke Pines, Florida: approximately 19,988 Jews live in Pembroke Pines.
  - Weston, Florida: approximately 18,000 Jews live in Weston.
  - Plantation, Florida approximately 11,275 Jews live in Plantation.
  - Davie, Florida approximately 11,228 Jews live in Davie.
- South Palm Beach Metropolitan Area, Florida: approximately 134,200 Jews live in South Palm Beach County as of 2018.
- Boca Raton, Florida
- West Palm Beach Metropolitan Area, Florida: approximately 94,000 Jews live in West Palm Beach (Palm Beach County from Boynton Beach to Jupiter).
- Miami Metropolitan Area, Florida: approximately 123,000 Jews live in Miami-Dade County, an increase from 113,000 in 2004.
  - Miami Beach, Florida: Approximately 15,000 Jews live in Miami Beach.
  - Aventura, Florida
  - Surfside, Florida
  - Bal Harbour, Florida
  - Sunny Isles Beach, Florida
  - Golden Beach, Florida
- Fort Myers, Florida
- Key West, Florida

== Prominent South Floridian Jews ==
- Captain Byron Jaffe, Weston, Fl
- Abraham C. Myers, U.S. Army colonel and namesake of Fort Myers, Florida
- David Sholtz, former Governor of Florida
- Gabriel Groisman, Mayor of Bal Harbour, Florida
- Abe Aronovitz, former Mayor of Miami
- Dave Aronberg, State Attorney for Palm Beach County, Florida
- Debbie Wasserman Schultz, U.S. Representative from Florida's 25th congressional district
- Ted Deutch, former U.S. Representative from Florida's 22nd congressional district
- Jared Moskowitz, U.S. Representative from Florida's 23rd congressional district
- Lois Frankel, U.S. Representative from Florida's 22nd congressional district
- Nikki Fried, Florida Secretary of Agriculture
- Robert Shevin, former Florida Attorney General and Third District Court of Appeal judge
- Mitchell Wolfson, founder of Wometco Enterprises and former Mayor of Miami Beach, Florida
- Philip Levine, former Mayor of Miami Beach and 2018 gubernatorial candidate
- The Applerouth family of Key West and Miami
- Chuck Todd, television journalist and former host of Meet the Press
- Lou Sola, Federal Maritime Commissioner
- Leonard L. Abess, banker and former owner of City National Bank of Florida
- Avraham Lapciuc, businessman, philanthropist, and Rutgers alumnus
- Eric Andre, actor and comedian
- Ben Shapiro, conservative political commentator
- Sholom Lipskar, rabbi and founder of The Shul of Bal Harbour
- Efrem Goldberg, rabbi of Boca Raton Synagogue
- BLP Kosher, rapper from Boca Raton, Florida
- Mica Tenenbaum and Matthew Levin, members of synth-pop duo Magdalena Bay (band)
- Jeffrey Epstein, American financier and child sex offender

== See also ==
- Jewish Americans
- Jewish American Heritage Month
