= Hotel tax in the United States =

Type of tax

A hotel tax or lodging tax in the United States is a tax levied by states, cities or counties against travellers when they rent accommodations (a room, rooms, entire home, or other living space) in a hotel, inn, tourist home or house, motel, or other lodging, generally unless the stay is for a period of 30 days or more. In addition to sales tax, it is collected when payment is made for the accommodation, and it is then remitted by the lodging operator to the city or county. It can also be called hotel occupancy tax in places like New York City and Texas. Despite its name, it generally applies to the same range of accommodations.

Hotel taxes in the United States are usually levied at a state level but in some cases cities and counties add additional charges on top.

Other examples of lodging include camping sites and space at a campground or recreational vehicle park.

States not listed below do not charge additional taxes on lodgings.

== Alabama ==
The state of Alabama imposes a statewide transient occupancy tax. In sixteen counties in northern Alabama, the rate is 5%, while it is 4% in all other counties. Counties and cities may charge additional tax, and rates vary by locality.

== Alaska ==
Several municipalities in Alaska impose lodging taxes, although no statewide tax exists. Rates vary from 3% to 12%.

== Arizona ==
Counties are authorized to impose additional taxes on lodgings of up to 6%.

== Arkansas ==
Lodging taxes in Arkansas are restricted to cities under 5,000 people with areas designated as historic districts and included on the National Register of Historic Places. These cities may impose a tax of up to 2%.

== California ==
The authority to levy the transient occupancy tax (TOT) is granted to the legislative bodies of both cities and counties by California Revenue and Taxation Code 7280.

The authority to collect the tax is generally granted to the county tax collector by an ordinance of the Board of Supervisors of that county. For example, the county code of Los Angeles County instructs hotel operators to pay the tax collector monthly.

== Colorado ==
Counties and municipalities may impose additional taxes on lodging. The same applies to local marketing districts. County taxes may not be more than 2%. while marketing district taxes can be of any rate. While originally intended to fund tourism promotions, the Colorado legislature amended the law in 2022 to permit funding for housing for tourism workers and capital projects. Voters will have the option to choose how funds are allocated, as long as at least 10% is allocated to tourism promotion.

== Connecticut ==
Connecticut charges a room occupancy tax for stays in hotels, motels, and beds and breakfasts. The rate is 15% for hotels and motels and 11% for B&Bs.

== Delaware ==
Delaware charges a lodging tax of 8%.

== Florida ==
Florida Statutes authorize local counties to impose transient rental taxes on rentals of hotels, motels, timeshares, and other short-term rentals. Various statutes allow for counties to impose rates between 3% and 6%. The variation depends on whether counties contain professional sports facilities or not, as additional tax can be imposed to offset public investment in such facilities.

Two other taxes may be imposed on lodgings. The first, the tourist impact tax, aims to protect environmentally sensitive areas. These areas include the Florida Keys and Apalachicola Bay. An additional 1% may be imposed to fund public land acquisitions. Additionally, three municipalities in Miami-Dade County (Bal Harbour, Miami Beach, and Surfside) are eligible to impose a municipal resort tax of up to 4%. These taxes are separate from the county-wide tax. The rate in Bal Harbour and Surfside is 4%, while it is 7% in Miami Beach. Municipal resort taxes "must be used for among other tourism related activities, for the enhancement of tourism, publicity and advertising purposes" according to statute. As the result of a concerted 5+ year international destination marketing effort funded by resort taxes in Bal Harbour, per capita resort tax revenues grew +35% owing to increased tourism longterm, demonstrating positive impact on municipalities as a result of total taxes (resort and non-) raised.

== Georgia ==
Georgia charges a $5/night "hotel/motel fee" on all accommodations in the state. Counties and municipalities may impose their own additional taxes as well.

== Hawaii ==
A statewide "transient accommodations tax" of 10.25% applies to tourist accommodations in Hawaii. Counties may impose additional tax of up to 3%.

== Idaho ==
In Idaho, tourist accommodations are subject to three types of tax: the statewide sales tax, travel and convention tax, and auditorium district taxes. The travel and convention tax is 2%. Auditorium district taxes apply only to Boise, Idaho Falls, and Pocatello. This tax can be up to 5%.

== Illinois ==
Statewide, all hotel occupancies are levied a 6% tax. This tax applies to only 94% of gross receipts. In the city of Chicago, three other taxes apply. The first funds the Illinois Sports Facilities Authority at a rate of 2% on 98% of gross receipts. The second funds the Metropolitan Pier and Exposition Authority at a rate of 2.5% on all gross receipts. The final tax applies to 99% of gross receipts and funds the municipality generally at a rate of 1%.

== Indiana ==
Certain counties in Indiana impose an innkeeper's tax on accommodations. Rates vary from 3.5% to 10%.

== Iowa ==
Statewide, a 5% excise tax is imposed on lodging. Cities and counties can impose additional tax of up to 7%.

== Kansas ==
Cities and counties are authorized to impose a transient guest tax on lodgings. Cities can only impose such a tax if they are located in a county which has not done so countywide. The state Department of Revenue collects all taxes for the counties, keeping 2% of the tax to defray expenses. The remaining 98% is distributed to local governments for tourism promotion.

== Louisiana ==
The only additional lodging taxes in Louisiana apply to establishments in Jefferson Parish and New Orleans. In both localities, a 4% applies and funds the Louisiana Stadium and Exposition District (responsible for various sports facilities in New Orleans). Lodgings in New Orleans must pay an additional 3% tax to fund the New Orleans Morial Convention Center plus a nightly surcharge which varies based on the number of rooms in an establishment.

== Maine ==
The statewide sales tax rate on hotel stays is 9%, which is higher than the standard sales tax rate. No local taxes exist.

== Maryland ==
Enabling legislation at the State level allows Counties to impose hotel rental taxes. Hotel rental taxes are imposed in all counties. They range from 4% in Talbot County to 9.5% in Baltimore County and City. Some municipalities in Maryland are also authorized to impose a hotel rental tax.

Only lodgings in Dorchester County must pay an additional hotel surcharge. The rate of tax is not specified in the statutes.

== Massachusetts ==
Statewide, a 5% excise tax applies to accommodations. Municipalities may impose an additional tax of up to 6% (6.5% in the city of Boston). In December 2018, Massachusetts Governor Charlie Baker signed into law a bill applying the state hotel tax to short-term rentals (such as Airbnb) with an exemption for rentals fewer than 14 days.

== Michigan ==
A state convention facility development tax applies to lodgings in Macomb, Oakland, and Wayne Counties. The rate varies by number of rooms and is higher in the city of Detroit.

== Minnesota ==
Various localities in Minnesota impose additional taxes on accommodations.

== Mississippi ==
The statewide rate of sales tax on hotels in Mississippi is 7%. Localities may also impose tourism and economic development taxes on accommodations in their jurisdiction.

== Montana ==
Statewide, a bed tax of 4% is imposed on accommodations in Montana. This tax funds specific state entities such as public universities and tourism promotion agencies. Additionally, localities may impose a "resort tax" on accommodations of up to 3%. Localities must meet maximum population requirements to impose such a tax.

== Nevada ==
Counties are authorized to impose a tax of 1% on accommodations. Cities may also impose taxes of up to 2%.

== New Hampshire ==
The statewide bed tax in New Hampshire is 8.5% The tax decreased from 9% to 8.5% in October 2021 based on a recommendation from Governor Chris Sununu. Sununu later proposed suspending the tax entirely in 2022 due to rising inflation.

== New Jersey ==
In general, New Jersey charges a state occupancy fee of 5% on accommodations. This tax is reduced, however, in some cities which charge their own municipal occupancy fees. These are North Wildwood, Wildwood, and Wildwood Crest (where the fee is 3%), and Atlantic City, Elizabeth, Jersey City, and Newark (where the fee is 1%). Other municipalities charge municipal taxes as well, but the state fee still applies in full. These municipal taxes may be up to 3%. Additionally, casinos in Atlantic City are charged $2 per day. The state implemented this surcharge in 2022 to fund public safety measures.

== New York ==
New York does not charge a statewide bed tax, but municipalities are authorized to do so. In New York City, for example, the tax is $1.50 per day.

== North Carolina ==
North Carolina does not charge a statewide bed tax, but cities, counties, and special districts may do so. Mecklenburg County, for example, charges 8%.

== North Dakota ==
Cities and counties may impose taxes of up to 2% on accommodations.

== Ohio ==
Municipalities and townships may impose taxes of up to 3% on accommodations.

== Oklahoma ==
Counties in Oklahoma with populations of 200,000 or less, as well as municipalities, are authorized to impose lodging taxes.

== Oregon ==
Oregon imposes a statewide 1.5% tax on accommodations. Cities and counties may impose additional taxes.

== Pennsylvania ==
Pennsylvania charges a hotel occupancy tax on accommodations, in place of sales tax. It is imposed at the same rate as sales tax, which is 6% in places other than Allegheny County and Philadelphia, 7% in Allegheny County, and 8% in Philadelphia.

== Rhode Island ==
Rhode Island charges a 6% statewide bed tax.

== South Carolina ==
Statewide, there is an accommodations tax of 7%. 2% of the statewide tax is given to county governments. Counties and cities may also impose additional taxes of up to 3%.

== South Dakota ==
South Dakota charges a statewide 1.5% tourism tax on accommodations and other tourist-related businesses.

== Tennessee ==
Local governments may impose local occupancy taxes on accommodations.

== Texas ==
Statewide, Texas imposes a hotel occupancy tax of 6%. This tax applies only if the cost of accommodation is $15/night or more. Local governments may impose additional hotel occupancy taxes if the cost is $2/night or more.

== Utah ==
Local governments may impose transient room taxes on accommodations.

== Vermont ==
Vermont imposes a statewide rooms tax of 9% on accommodations. Municipalities may impose an additional 1% tax.

== Virginia ==
Counties and municipalities may impose a transient occupancy tax on accommodations. A portion of the funds must be used for tourism promotion purposes.

== Washington ==
Localities may impose additional taxes on accommodations. Lodgings in King and Pierce Counties must also charge guests a convention center and trade tax. Certain "tourism promotion areas" also impose lodging taxes.

== West Virginia ==
Counties and municipalities may assess hotel occupancy taxes. The rate is generally 6% but can be less.

== Wisconsin ==
Additional taxes on accommodations apply only to Milwaukee County. County-wide, the rate is 3%, but an additional 7% tax applies to accommodations within the city of Milwaukee itself.

== Wyoming ==
Wyoming imposes a statewide hotel tax of 5%. 2% of the state tax revenue is allocated to county governments. Counties may impose an additional 2% tax as well. Before 2021, counties could impose a rate of up to 4%, but the state reduced the rate after imposing its own bed tax.

== See also ==
- Hotel Receipts Tax
