= Eva Danielle =

American fashion designer

Eva Danielle, Inc.
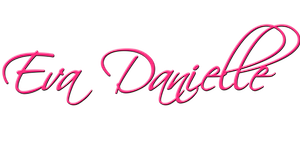
- Industry: Fashion
- Founded: 2005; 21 years ago
- Founder: Eva Danielle Wittels, Harrison Leigh Wittels
- Headquarters: Miami, Florida, United States
- Website: www.evadanielle.com

Eva Danielle, Inc. is a women's fashion label based in Miami, Florida. Its first collection was released in August 2005. Eva Danielle designs have been seen on celebrities such as Paris Hilton, Britney Spears, Janice Dickinson, The Go Go's, Michelle Delamor, Iryna Storozhuk, and Sindy Perez; plus featured in television programs such as the Janice Dickinson Show, Bravo, Deco Drive, The Simple Life, Make a Wish Foundation, The Bad Girls Club, and She's Got the Look, along with numerous publications. Aveda also commissioned a collection for its 2007 shows. The fashion was featured at the Miami Funkshion Swim Wear Fashion Week 2010 as well.

== History ==
Eva Danielle's flagship store was opened in 2008 in Bal Harbor. In addition to Miami, her designs are sold in the U.S., Middle East and throughout Asia. The label was founded by Eva Danielle Wittels and Harrison Leigh Wittels. Eva Danielle Wittels is the chief designer who earned a BFA in Fashion Design with a minor in Art History from the school of the Art Institute of Chicago before gaining practical experience in Paris. Her brother, Harrison Leigh Wittels, earned degrees in philosophy and business administration from Southern Methodist University is the President and the Chief of Operations.

In 2013, high fashion brand headquartered in Florida, Eva Danielle launched operations in Pune, India. Nikhil Hegde, Chief Operation Officer said the company has been testing the franchisee's growth route in India and has partnered with SKPJ Apparel headquartered in Bangalore. The business aims to open a second store in either Delhi or Bangalore, likely followed by Mumbai, Chandigarh and Ludhiana at an approximate Rs 1 crore/10,000,000 Indian Rupee ($130,950) expenditure per shop.

== Charity ==
Eva Danielle also directly donates proceeds from purchases to the Helping Homeless Animals organization.
