= USCGC Shrike =

United States Coast Guard patrol boat

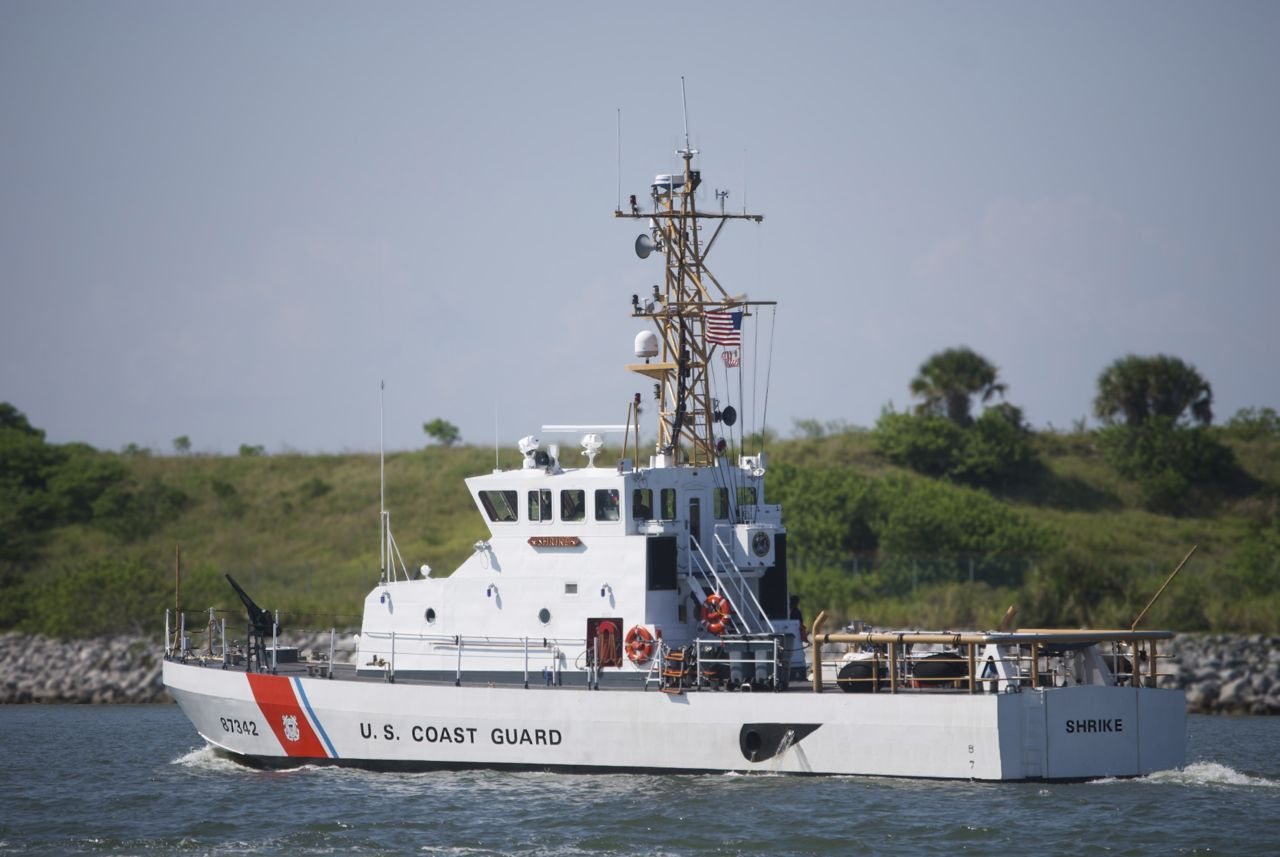
- Shrike in 2012

History

United States
- Name: Shrike
- Namesake: Shrike
- Operator: United States Coast Guard
- Builder: Bollinger Shipyards, Lockport, Louisiana
- Launched: November 13, 2001
- Commissioned: January 22, 2002 (special)
- Home port: Port Canaveral, Florida (2010–2014); Sandy Hook, New Jersey (2017)
- Identification: Hull number: WPB-87342
- Status: In active service
- Badge

General characteristics
- Class & type: Marine Protector-class patrol boat
- Length: 87 ft (27 m)

USCGC Shrike (WPB-87342) is an 87-foot (27 m) Marine Protector-class of the United States Coast Guard. It was based for several years at Port Canaveral on Florida's Space Coast. In 2017 it moved to Coast Guard Station Sandy Hook in New Jersey, where it patrolled the waters off northern New Jersey. By 2021 it was operating off southwest Florida for Coast Guard Sector St. Petersburg. Its primary missions include search and rescue, maritime law enforcement, fisheries enforcement, marine environmental protection, defense readiness and port and coastal security.

== Design ==
Shrike is one of the Marine Protector-class coastal patrol boats built for the Coast Guard by Bollinger Shipyards of Lockport, Louisiana, under a contract first awarded on March 13, 1996. The class replaced the older 82-foot Point-class cutters. It was launched and christened on November 13, 2001, and entered service in a special commissioning on January 22, 2002.

== Service history ==
In an incident reported in January 2009, Shrike and the patrol boat Bluefin searched for an employee who had fallen overboard from the cruise ship Carnival Sensation off Vero Beach. On September 2, 2010, a large sailboat was found adrift with no one aboard in 9-to-12-foot (2.7 to 3.7 m) seas stirred up by Hurricane Earl, about 5 miles (8.0 km) off Cocoa Beach. Shrike towed it to Port Canaveral.

In October 2014 Shrike took part in the search for two Cuban migrants missing between Caesar Creek and Haulover Inlet in southeast Florida.

In 2017 Shrike and the 110-foot (34 m) patrol boat Sitkinak moved to Coast Guard Station Sandy Hook, New Jersey. They had spent nearly five years at Bayonne while the station was rebuilt after damage from Hurricane Sandy in 2012. In late summer 2017 the cutter patrolled the coast from Sandy Hook to Long Branch, making random safety stops of recreational boats. In September it helped protect New York City waterways during the annual session of the United Nations General Assembly.

On January 11, 2021, the operator of a 41-foot (12 m) pleasure boat with three people aboard radioed Coast Guard Sector St. Petersburg to report electrical problems about 70 miles (110 km) southwest of Marco Island. Shrike towed the boat toward shore and handed it off the next day to a response boat from Station Fort Myers Beach near the Fort Myers Beach sea buoy.

== See also ==
- Marine Protector-class patrol boat
- List of United States Coast Guard cutters
