= Jewish Heritage Month =

Jewish Heritage Month is an annual observance, commemorated in May in various English-speaking countries, that celebrates the rich history, culture, and contributions of Jewish communities around the world. While specific dates and the name of the observance may vary by country, the essence of the celebration remains consistent: to recognize and honor the Jewish heritage and its impact on various societies.

== Canada ==
In Canada, Jewish Heritage Month is celebrated in May. The Canadian Jewish Heritage Month Act was passed in 2018, establishing this observance across the country. The month is marked by educational programs, cultural events, and community activities that highlight the achievements and history of Jewish Canadians. It aims to foster understanding and appreciation of the Jewish community's contributions to Canadian society.

== United Kingdom ==
A bill proposing May as British Jewish Heritage Month is currently under consideration by Parliament. Various activities like lectures, exhibitions, and community events already take place in May to celebrate the historical and contemporary contributions of Jewish people to British culture and society. These celebrations aim to combat antisemitism and promote cultural awareness and inclusivity.

== Israel ==
In Israel, Jewish Heritage Month is not a formal observance, as Jewish culture and history are integral to the nation's identity and are celebrated throughout the year. However, specific periods, such as the Jewish holidays commemorations like Yom HaShoah (Holocaust Remembrance Day) and Yom Ha'atzmaut (Israeli Independence Day), usually in May, serve to honor and reflect on Jewish heritage.

== United States ==
In the United States, Jewish American Heritage Month is celebrated in May. Established in 2006 by presidential proclamation, it recognizes the contributions of Jewish Americans to the nation's history, culture, and society. Various events, educational programs, and cultural activities are organized to celebrate Jewish American achievements and promote understanding and appreciation of Jewish culture.

== See also ==
- Jewish American Heritage Month
- Canadian Jewish Heritage Month
- Jewish history
- Jewish culture
- Antisemitism
