= Haulover Park =

Public park in Florida, US

Coordinates: 25.911165°N 80.121324°W

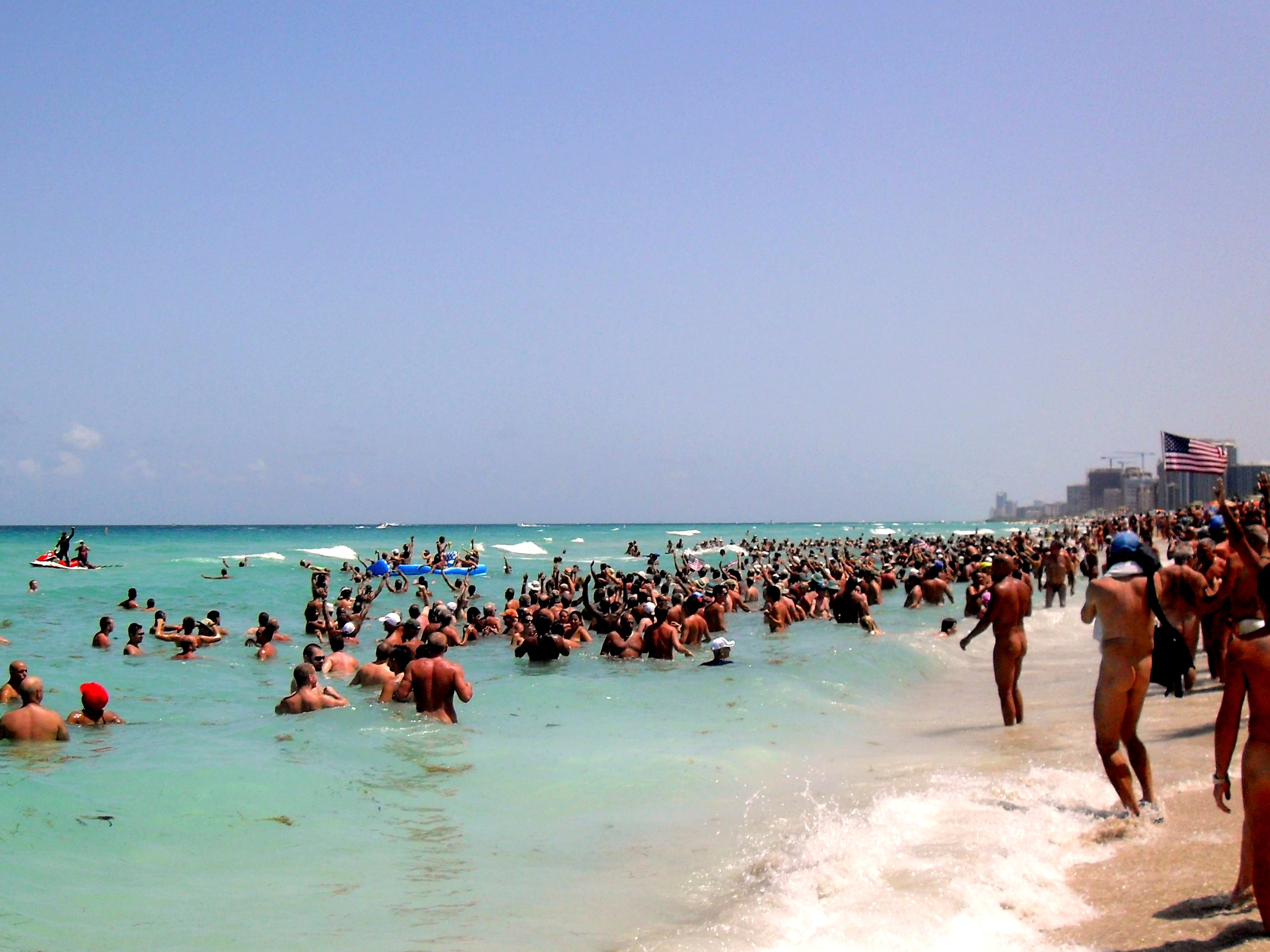
- Trial for world record in skinny-dipping, 2009
- Interactive map of Haulover Park
- Type: Municipal
- Location: Haulover Beach, Miami-Dade County, Florida, United States
- Area: 99 acres (40 ha)
- Created: 1948
- Operator: Miami-Dade Parks and Recreation Department
- Website: Haulover Park

Haulover Park is a 177-acre (72 ha) urban park owned and operated by Miami-Dade County Parks, Recreation & Open Spaces Department, located in metropolitan Miami, just north of Bal Harbour, Florida. The park is located on a shoal between the Atlantic Ocean and Biscayne Bay, just north of the Broad Causeway (SR 922) and Collins Avenue.

== History ==
The Dade County Commission procured the beach front property in 1940 following a lobbying effort for a $2 million municipal bond ($36 million, in 2018 dollars) by county commissioner Charles H. Crandon for the purchases of northern Key Biscayne (what became Crandon Park) and the beach north of Baker's Haulover Inlet, then called Ocean Beach.

Construction began on beach facilities in 1941, halted soon afterward due to funding holds following the onset of World War II. Work on the property resumed in 1945, and the park was renamed Haulover Park in January 1947, opening to the public the following year in late 1948.

An 1,100-foot fishing pier extended into the Atlantic Ocean until it was destroyed by Hurricane Andrew in 1992.

== Nude beach ==
The northern 0.4-mile (0.6 km) of the 1.5-mile (2.4 km) shoreline is a nude beach officially recognized and approved by the government of Miami-Dade County. The clothing-optional section was first designated by South Florida Free Beaches, a local naturist organization, in July 1991. The county at first tolerated but did not sanction the usage; it eventually allowed the installation of permanent signs marking the clothing-optional area, which were installed in December 1993. The clothing-optional area features lifeguards and a food and umbrella rental concession. It is the largest public nudist beach in the U.S. and attracts 1.3 million visitors per year.

== Facilities ==
The park features a marina, tennis courts, and an enclosed dog park. On the southern end of the park are several picnic recreational areas.

Haulover Beach and its surrounding area boast a plethora of amenities, such as lifeguards, barbecue grills, playgrounds for children, a skate park, golf course, adjacent marina, tennis courts, concession stands, picnic tables, restrooms, and rental facilities for water sports equipment, beach chairs, and umbrellas.

Additionally, a designated dog-friendly section of Haulover Beach allows dogs to roam without a leash, situated between Lifeguard Tower #2 and Lifeguard Tower #3.

== Gallery ==
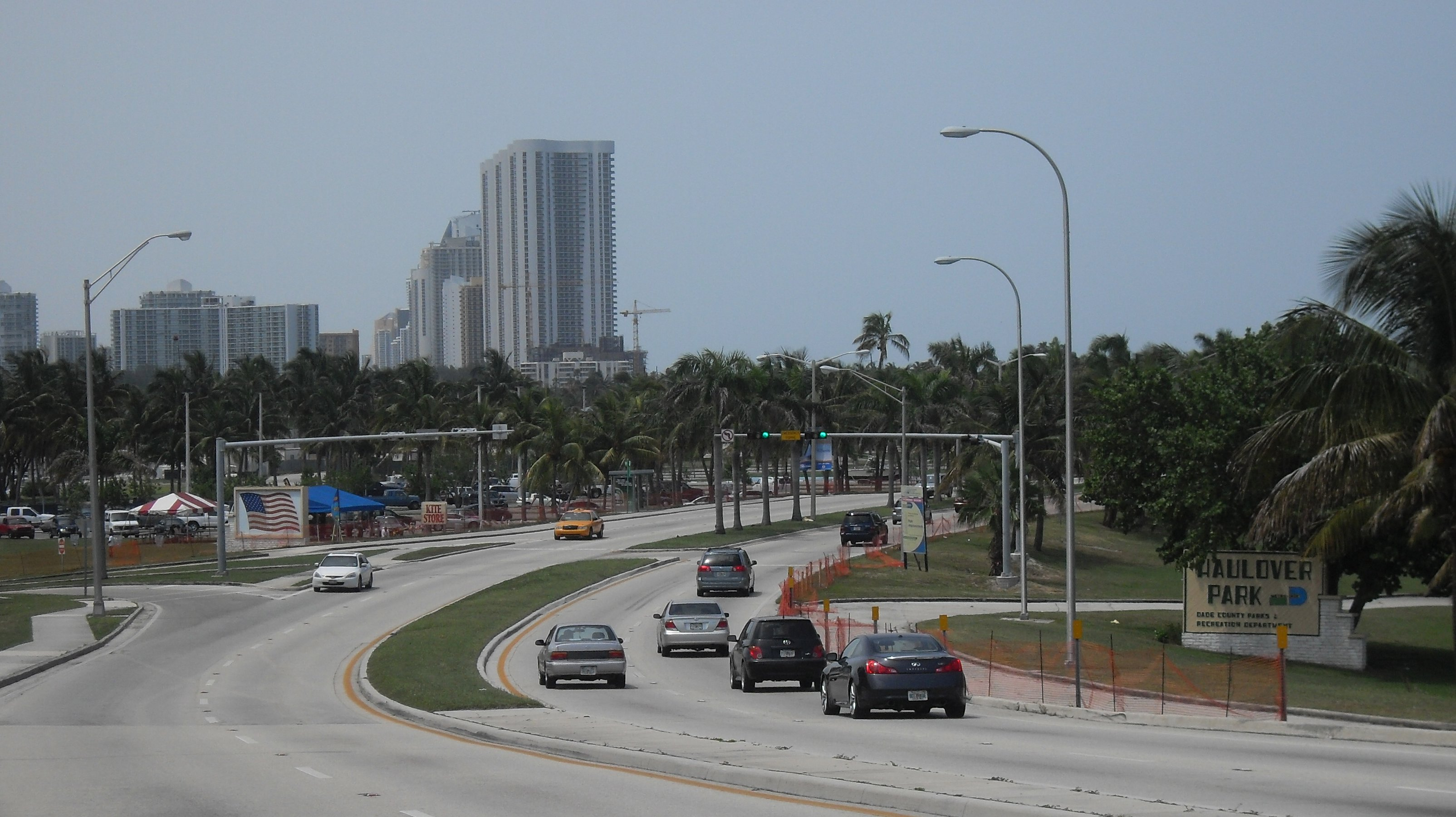
Entrance to Haulover Park northward on Collins Avenue

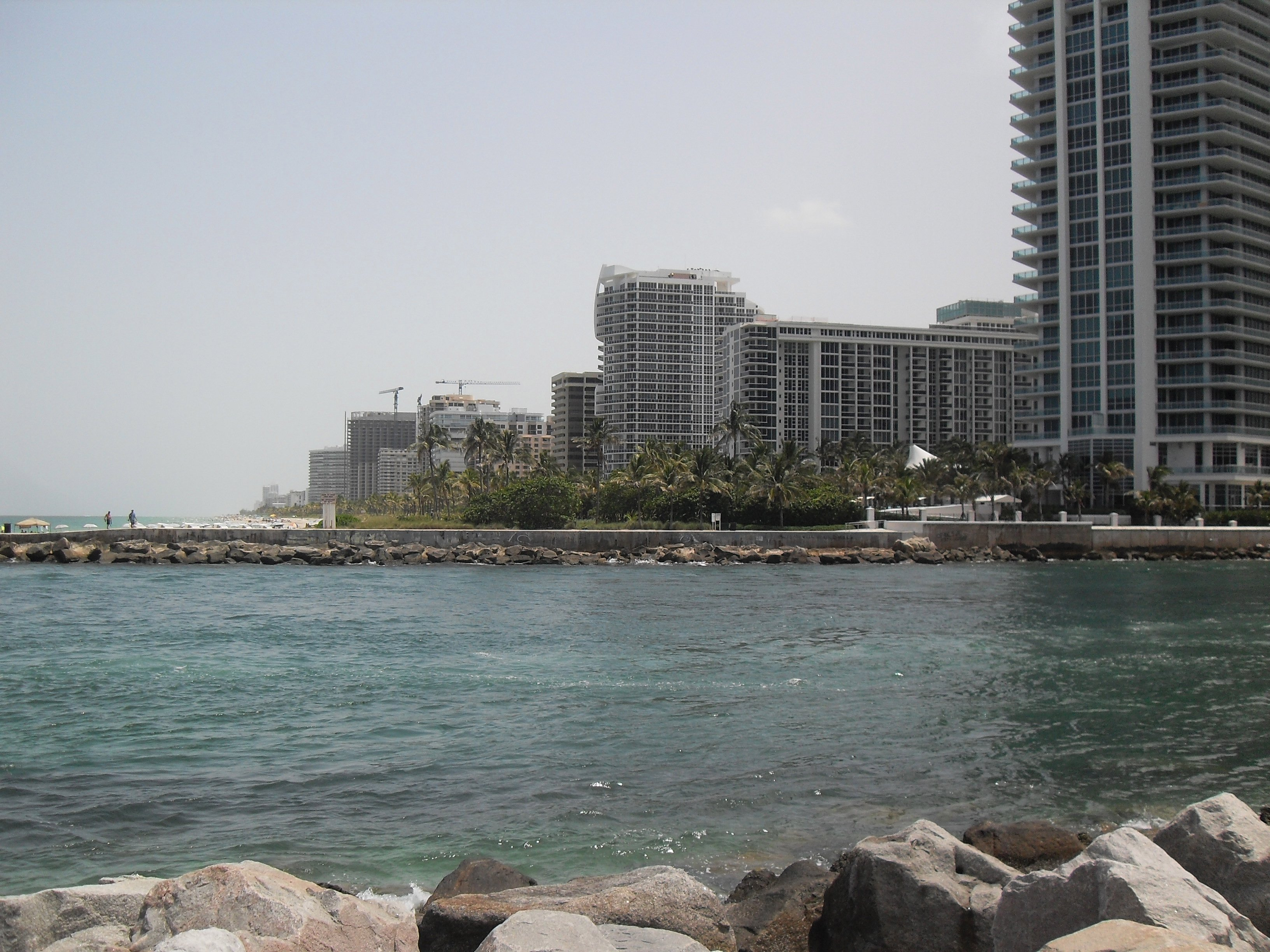
View on Bal Harbour across Baker's Haulover Inlet
