= Bay Harbor Islands, Florida =

- Town
- Town of Bay Harbor Islands
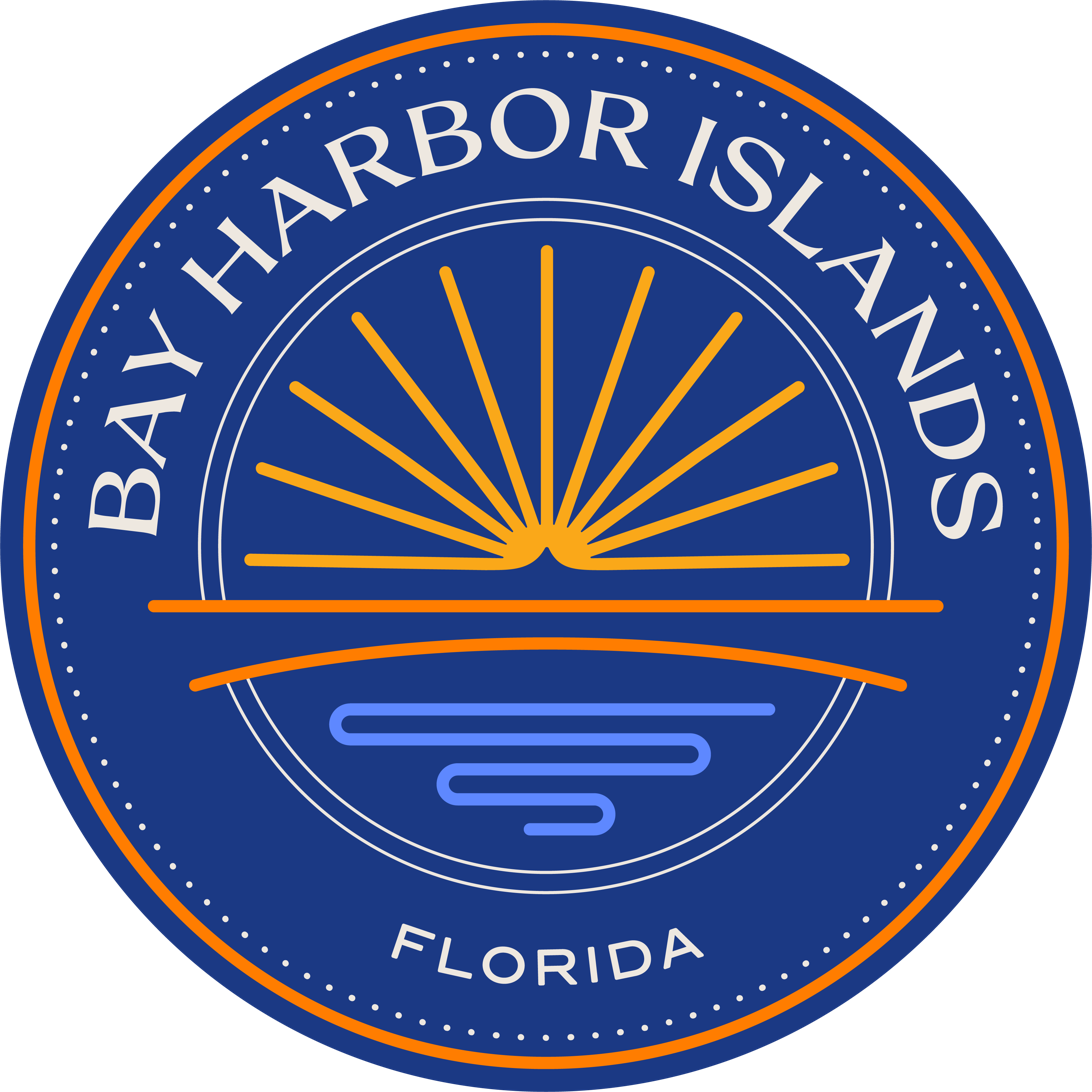
- Seal

- Location in Miami-Dade County, Florida

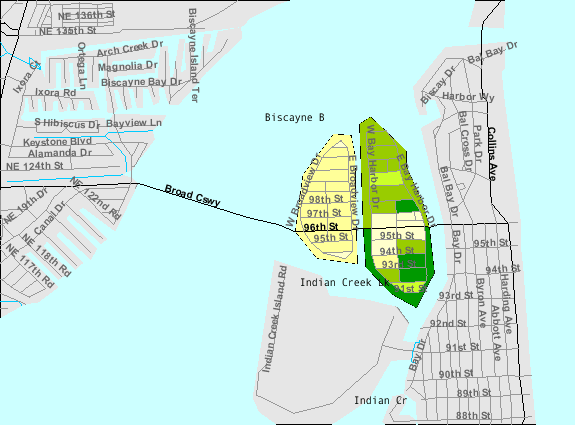
- U.S. Census Bureau map showing the Town's boundaries
- Coordinates: 25°53′16″N 80°08′01″W
- Country: United States
- State: Florida
- County: Miami-Dade
- Incorporated: April 28, 1947

Government
  - Type: Council-Manager
  - Mayor: Issac Salver
  - Vice Mayor: Stephanie Bruder
  - Commissioners: Robert H. Yaffe; Joshua D. Fuller; Elchonon Shagalov; Eric Rappaport; Molly Diallo
  - Town Manager: Lindsley Noel
  - Town Clerk: Evelyn Herbello

Area
  - Total: 0.42 sq mi (1.09 km^{2})
  - Land: 0.40 sq mi (1.03 km^{2})
  - Water: 0.023 sq mi (0.06 km^{2})
- Elevation: 7 ft (2.1 m)

Population (2020)
  - Total: 5,922
  - Density: 14,940.6/sq mi (5,768.58/km^{2})
- Time zone: UTC-5 (Eastern (EST))
  - Summer (DST): UTC-4 (EDT)
- ZIP code: 33154
- Area codes: 305, 786, 645
- FIPS code: 12-03975
- GNIS feature ID: 2405217
- Website: bayharborislands-fl.gov

Bay Harbor Islands is a town in Miami-Dade County, Florida, United States. The town is part of the Miami metropolitan area of South Florida. It is separated from the mainland by Biscayne Bay. The population was about 6,000 as of the 2020 United States census.

== History ==
Bay Harbor Islands was founded by Shepard Broad in 1947. Broad, an immigrant from Pinsk, Russia, acquired two undeveloped mangrove swamp islands and filled in the islands using his own funds and with down payments on the sale of lots. He was joined in the venture by businessman Benjamin N. Kane.

== Geography ==
Bay Harbor Islands is located near the north end of Biscayne Bay and consists of two islands, originally known as Broadview and Bay Harbor, now referred to as, respectively, the West and East Islands. The West Island features single family homes, while the East Island contains the business district, the Ruth K. Broad Bay Harbor K–8 Center, and multi-family housing. To the west, across Biscayne Bay, is the city of North Miami, connected via the Shepard Broad Causeway. To the east, across Indian Creek, lie the village of Bal Harbour and the town of Surfside. To the south across Indian Creek Lake, with no direct road access from Bay Harbor Islands, lies the village of Indian Creek.

Bay Harbor Islands is approximately 15 miles (24 km) (30 minutes driving distance) northeast of Miami International Airport, and 14 miles (23 km) (35 minutes) north of PortMiami.

According to the United States Census Bureau, the town has a total area of 0.4 square miles (1.0 km^{2}), including 0.03 square miles (0.08 km^{2}) (5.94%) of water.

=== Surrounding areas ===
Biscayne Bay
Biscayne Bay Bal Harbour
Biscayne Bay Bal Harbour
Biscayne Bay Surfside
Indian Creek, Surfside

== East Island architecture ==
At one time, Bay Harbor Islands East Island featured one of the largest concentrated collections of mid-century Miami Modern architecture. Now, one will find many of these buildings intermixed with contemporary residences and boutique waterfront condominiums.

== Demographics ==
Historical population
Census	Pop.	Note	%±
1950	296		—
1960	3,249		997.6%
1970	4,619		42.2%
1980	4,869		5.4%
1990	4,703		−3.4%
2000	5,146		9.4%
2010	5,628		9.4%
2020	5,922		5.2%
U.S. Decennial Census

=== 2020 census ===
As of the 2020 census, the town had a population of 5,922. The median age was 42.9 years; 22.5% of residents were under age 18 and 16.7% were age 65 or older. For every 100 females, there were 89.6 males, and for every 100 females age 18 and over, there were 86.1 males.

100.0% of residents lived in urban areas and 0.0% lived in rural areas.

There were 2,542 households, of which 31.8% had children under the age of 18 living in them. Of all households, 43.0% were married-couple households, 17.8% had a male householder with no spouse or partner present, and 31.9% had a female householder with no spouse or partner present. About 30.6% of all households were made up of individuals, and 12.1% had someone living alone who was 65 years of age or older.

There were 3,276 housing units, of which 22.4% were vacant. The homeowner vacancy rate was 5.1% and the rental vacancy rate was 13.6%.

Bay Harbor Islands racial composition (Hispanics excluded from racial categories) (NH = Non-Hispanic)
Race	Number	Percentage
White (NH)	2,748	46.40%
Black or African American (NH)	111	1.87%
Native American or Alaska Native (NH)	0	0.00%
Asian (NH)	67	1.13%
Pacific Islander or Native Hawaiian (NH)	0	0.00%
Some other race (NH)	53	0.89%
Two or more races/Multiracial (NH)	206	3.48%
Hispanic or Latino	2,737	46.22%
Total	5,922	

=== Demographic estimates ===
In the 2016-2020 American Community Survey estimates, there were 1,555 families residing in the town.

=== 2010 census ===
As of the 2010 United States census, there were 5,628 people, 2,494 households, and 1,418 families residing in the town.

Bay Harbor Islands Demographics
2010 Census	Bay Harbor Islands	Miami-Dade County	Florida
Total population	5,628	2,496,435	18,801,310
Population, percent change, 2000 to 2010	+9.4%	+10.8%	+17.6%
Population density	14,221.7/sq mi	1,315.5/sq mi	350.6/sq mi
White or Caucasian (including White Hispanic)	91.5%	73.8%	75.0%
(Non-Hispanic White or Caucasian)	49.1%	15.4%	57.9%
Black or African-American	2.5%	18.9%	16.0%
Hispanic or Latino (of any race)	46.3%	65.0%	22.5%
Asian	1.2%	1.5%	2.4%
Native American or Native Alaskan	0.2%	0.2%	0.4%
Pacific Islander or Native Hawaiian	0.0%	0.0%	0.1%
Two or more races (Multiracial)	2.3%	2.4%	2.5%
Some Other Race	2.3%	3.2%	3.6%

=== 2000 census ===
In 2000, 20.3% had children under the age of 18 living with them, 35.6% were married couples living together, 10.7% had a female householder with no husband present, and 50.4% were non-families. 43.1% of all households were made up of individuals, and 18.6% had someone living alone who was 65 years of age or older. The average household size was 1.97 and the average family size was 2.71.

In 2000, the town's population was spread out, with 18.0% under the age of 18, 5.0% from 18 to 24, 32.1% from 25 to 44, 21.7% from 45 to 64, and 23.3% who were 65 years of age or older. The median age was 42 years. For every 100 females, there were 80.1 males. For every 100 females age 18 and over, there were 75.3 males.

In 2000, the median income for a household in the Town was $38,514, and the median income for a family was $43,939. Males had a median income of $38,750 versus $31,044 for females. The per capita income for the Town was $29,261. About 8.0% of families and 13.1% of the population were below the poverty line, including 20.7% of those under age 18 and 6.8% of those age 65 or over.

As of 2000, speakers of English as a first language constituted 52.05% of the population, while Spanish accounted for 43.90%, Portuguese 1.65%, Hebrew 1.30%, and French 1.10%.

== Education ==
Ruth K. Broad Bay Harbor K–8 Center in Bay Harbor Islands serves as the local elementary and K–8 school. Residents who want to have a conventional middle school may instead choose the zoned middle school, Miami Beach Nautilus Middle School. Miami Beach Senior High School is the senior high school serving this area.

== Notable people ==
- Christian Fittipaldi (born 1971), race car driver
- George Kenney (1889–1977). United States Army general during World War II
- Nito Mestre (born 1952), songwriter
- Michael Salzhauer (born 1972), plastic surgeon
- Louis Slobodkin (1903–1975), sculptor, writer and illustrator of numerous children's books
- Sebastian Spreng (born 1956), visual artist and music journalist
- Walter Stone (1920–1999), screenwriter The Honeymooners
- Néstor Torres (born 1957), jazz flautist
- Lesley Visser (born 1953), sportscaster who was the first female NFL analyst on TV
- Garrett Wittels (born 1990), baseball player

== In popular culture ==
In the TV series Dexter, the title character Dexter Morgan's apartment is in Miami, but a real condo in Bay Harbor Islands was used for the exterior shooting location. In the second season of Dexter, the discovery of Dexter's victims' remains inspires the press to dub the serial killer the "Bay Harbor Butcher."

Parts of the video for the song "La Tortura" by Colombian recording artist, Shakira, featuring Spanish recording artist Alejandro Sanz, was recorded at the historic Coral Sea Towers building in Bay Harbor Islands.
