= USCGC Bluefin =

United States Coast Guard patrol boat, later of the Philippine Coast Guard

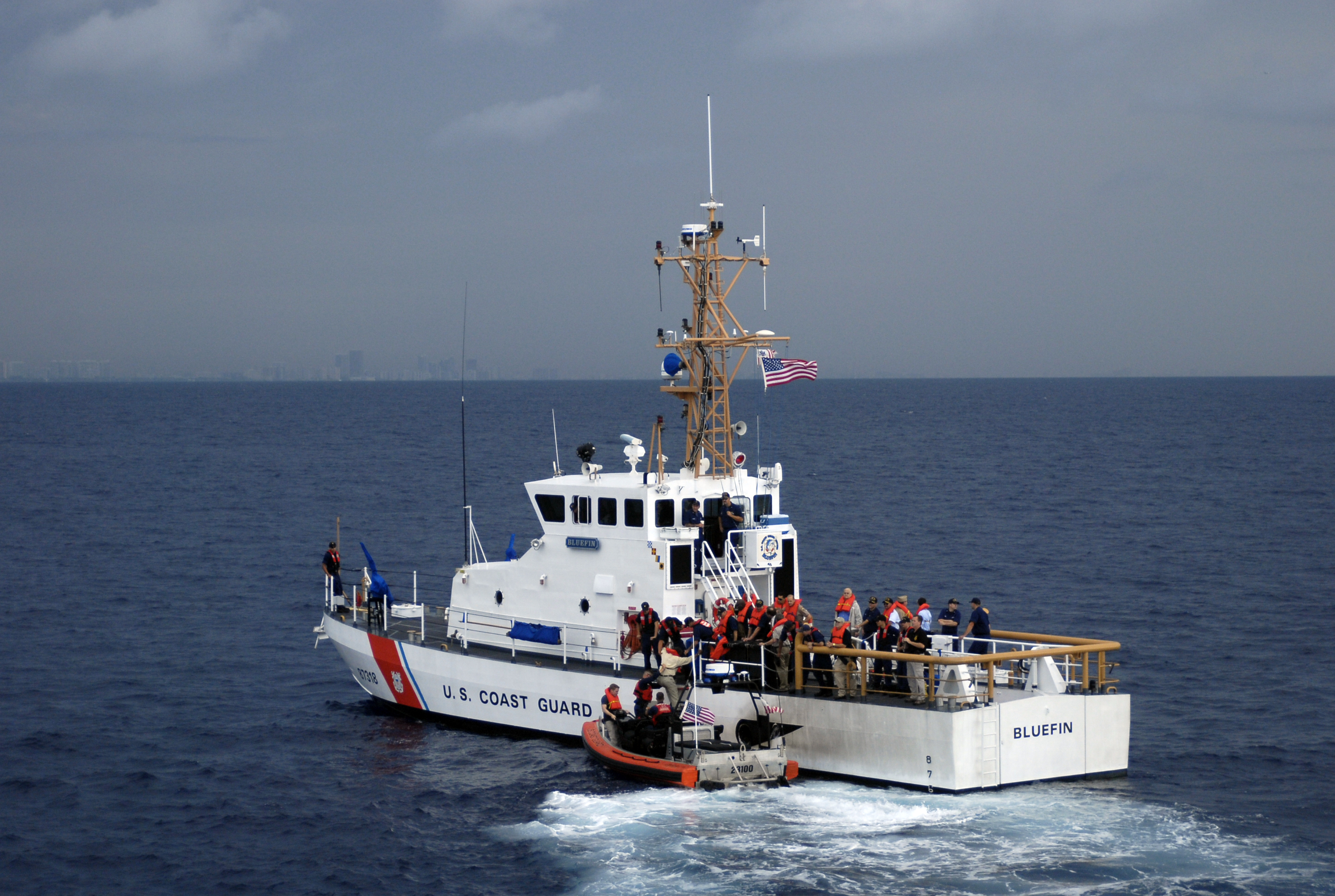
- Bluefin off Miami in June 2008

History

United States
- Name: Bluefin
- Namesake: Bluefin tuna
- Operator: United States Coast Guard
- Builder: Bollinger Shipyards, Lockport, Louisiana
- Home port: Fort Pierce, Florida
- Identification: Hull number: WPB-87318
- Fate: Transferred to the Philippines, 2026

Philippines
- Name: BRP Patag
- Operator: Philippine Coast Guard
- Acquired: August 20, 2026
- Identification: PATS-2702

General characteristics
- Class & type: Marine Protector-class patrol boat
- Length: 87 ft (27 m)

USCGC Bluefin (WPB-87318) is a former 87-foot (27 m) Marine Protector-class patrol boat of the United States Coast Guard. It was based at Fort Pierce, Florida, on Florida's Atlantic coast until 2026. After it was decommissioned, the United States transferred it to the Philippine Coast Guard in August 2026, and it was renamed BRP Patag (PATS-2702).

== Design ==
Bluefin is one of the Marine Protector-class coastal patrol boats built for the Coast Guard by Bollinger Shipyards of Lockport, Louisiana, under a contract first awarded on March 13, 1996. The class replaced the older 82-foot Point-class cutters.

== United States Coast Guard ==
On June 19, 2008, Bluefin worked offshore of Miami with the new national security cutter Bertholf, transferring personnel to Bertholf's small boat.

In an incident reported in January 2009, an employee fell overboard from the cruise ship Carnival Sensation about 20 miles (32 km) east of Vero Beach shortly before 1 a.m. Bluefin and the patrol boat Shrike joined aircraft from Air Station Miami and a boat from Station Fort Pierce in the search.

At about 2 a.m. on April 27, 2014, a 30-year-old passenger reportedly jumped over the railing of the cruise ship Bahamas Celebration about 27 miles (43 km) east of Delray Beach. Bluefin searched alongside a boat crew from Station Lake Worth Inlet, a helicopter and an HC-144 Ocean Sentry patrol aircraft from Air Station Miami.

== Philippine Coast Guard ==
In 2026, Bluefin and its sister ship Marlin were decommissioned and transferred to the Philippine Coast Guard. On August 20, 2026, the two boats were handed over at the Waterfront Operational Training Center in Baltimore, after 24 Philippine Coast Guard crew members finished operational and maintenance training. They were to be commissioned into the Philippine Coast Guard's littoral force as BRP Pag-asa (PATS-2701), formerly Marlin, and BRP Patag (PATS-2702), formerly Bluefin.

== See also ==
- List of United States Coast Guard cutters
