= Sholom Lipskar =

American Orthodox rabbi and community leader (1946–2025)

Personal life
- Born: August 1, 1946 Tashkent, Uzbek SSR, USSR
- Died: May 3, 2025 (aged 78) Miami, Florida, U.S.
- Buried: Montefiore Cemetery

Religious life
- Religion: Judaism
- Denomination: Orthodox Judaism

Jewish leader
- Position: Rabbi
- Synagogue: The Shul of Bal Harbour
- Semikhah: 1968

Sholom Dovber Lipskar (August 1, 1946 – May 3, 2025) was an American Orthodox rabbi and community leader. He founded The Shul of Bal Harbour, which he led for more than four decades, and the Aleph Institute, and was known for his contributions to Jewish outreach, military chaplaincy, and support for incarcerated individuals.

Described as "one of Florida’s most influential Orthodox leaders" and as "a pioneer in modern Jewish outreach," Lipskar played a key role in developing Jewish life in Surfside and Bal Harbour over more than four decades, transforming them into thriving Jewish communities.

== Early life and education ==
Lipskar was born on August 1, 1946 in Tashkent, Uzbek Soviet Socialist Republic to Rabbi Eliyahu Akiva and Rochel Baila (née Duchman) Lipskar, 20 days before his family escaped the country to flee Stalinist persecution. Without official documentation, he was reportedly transported across the border in a suitcase. He spent part of his early childhood in a refugee camp in Germany before immigrating to Toronto, Ontario, Canada in the early 1950s. His father became a Jewish educator. He was educated at the original Lubavitch Yeshiva in Toronto, and at age 15, he was sent to New York to study at the Central Lubavitcher Yeshivah. After receiving rabbinic ordination in 1968, he was sent by the Lubavitcher Rebbe to Miami Beach to begin his work in Jewish outreach.

== Career ==
In 1969, after his marriage to Chani Minkowicz and a year of advanced study, Lipskar was appointed by Menachem Mendel Schneerson as an emissary to Miami, then lacking basic Jewish infrastructure. The couple initially led a newly founded Chabad day school established by Rabbi Avrohom Korf. Lipskar later founded the Yeshiva Gedolah and served as principal and dean across its elementary, middle, and high school divisions.

Lipskar began with informal gatherings and prayer services on Collins Avenue before establishing The Shul of Bal Harbour, a prominent landmark synagogue known for its inclusivity. In 1981, he founded the Aleph Institute, a national nonprofit organization supporting Jewish prisoners, their families, and military personnel. He later noted that some community members initially questioned his work with Aleph, not understanding his focus on supporting individuals in the criminal justice system. Over time, he said, support grew as public attitudes toward criminal justice reform shifted. He conducted prison visits and taught Torah to incarcerated individuals.

In 1982, at the direction of Rabbi Schneerson, Lipskar and his wife Chani established a Chabad congregation in Bal Harbour. The town attracted wealthy and influential individuals from around the world, and Schneerson saw the potential for a thriving synagogue there to serve as a model for similar communities. He had been involved in expanding Chabad schools and yeshivas in South Florida since the 1960s. At the time, housing deeds in Bal Harbour specifically barred the sale of homes to Jews, and local institutions maintained exclusionary policies. According to his nephew, Lipskar did not view his property in person during his search for a home and only saw it after it had been purchased. Lipskar fought to install a public Hanukkah menorah and divided his time between his congregation and the Aleph Institute.

Following Lipskar’s arrival, the Bal Harbour Jewish community grew significantly. The Shul of Bal Harbour eventually became one of the largest Orthodox synagogues in Miami-Dade County, and has served thousands, including a substantial Sephardic and Latin American constituency. In the aftermath of the 2021 Surfside condominium collapse, Lipskar transformed it into a support center for first responders and families of the missing. It has also hosted dignitaries including Senator and Vice Presidential candidate Joe Lieberman, Florida Governor Ron DeSantis and Argentine President Javier Milei.

Lipskar served as the official chaplain endorser for the U.S. Department of Defense and for the Educational Academy for the Elderly, where he oversaw pilot programs aimed at redefining educational priorities for older adults. He also founded the Miami International Conferences on Torah and Science.

== Personal life ==
Lipskar was married to Chani Minkowicz. They had two children: Zalman Lipskar, a rabbi, and Devorah Leah Andrusier. He had several grandchildren.

== Death ==
Lipskar died of heart failure in Miami, on May 3, 2025, after a period of declining health. He was 78. His funeral procession passed the Chabad-Lubavitch World Headquarters in Brooklyn before his burial at Montefiore Cemetery in Queens.

Upon Lipskar’s death, former Florida Governor Rick Scott tweeted, "We were honored to call him a friend. He was a guiding light during the Surfside tragedy and will always be remembered for his kind spirit." In a eulogy, Yeshiva World News described Lipskar's legacy as one of "towering leadership, boundless heart, and an unwavering commitment to the Lubavitcher Rebbe's shlichus."
