= Jewish American Heritage Month =

Annual celebration of Jewish American achievements in May

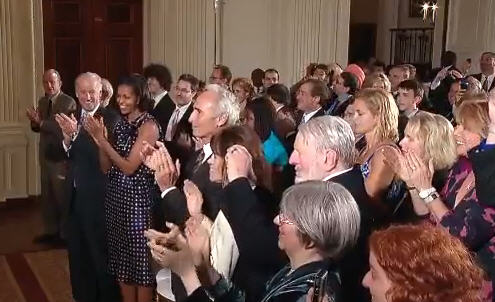
- Guests at 2010 White House reception for JAHM, including baseball star Sandy Koufax (center left), and entertainer/activist Theodore Bikel (center right)
- Observed by: United States
- Significance: Annual recognition of Jewish American achievements and contributions to the United States.
- Begins: May 1
- Ends: May 31
- Date: May
- Duration: 1 month
- Frequency: annual

Jewish American Heritage Month (JAHM) is an annual recognition and celebration of American Jews' achievements and contributions to the United States of America during the month of May.

President George W. Bush first proclaimed the month on April 20, 2006, as a result of cooperation with Sen. Arlen Specter (R-PA), as well as the Jewish Museum of Florida and the South Florida Jewish Community. Since then, annual proclamations have been made by Presidents Bush, Obama, Trump, and Biden.

In 2020, the National Museum of American Jewish History in Philadelphia repositioned Jewish American Heritage Month to empower communities across the country to celebrate the history of Jewish people in America; educate diverse public audiences about Jewish culture, and spark crucial conversations about the American Jewish present and future.

== Purpose ==
In April 2006, President George W. Bush announced that May 2006 would be considered Jewish American Heritage Month. The announcement followed urging by the Jewish Museum of Florida and South Florida Jewish Community for a celebration of Jewish Americans and Jewish American Heritage.

On February 14, 2006, Congress issued House Concurrent Resolution 315 which stated:

"Resolved ... that Congress urges the President to issue each year a proclamation calling on State and local governments and the people of the United States to observe an American Jewish History Month with appropriate programs, ceremonies, and activities."

The concurrent resolution (i.e., a non-binding legislative measure that lacks the force of law, appropriate when a law is not necessary—such as awards or recognitions) was passed unanimously, first in the United States House of Representatives in December 2005 and later in the United States Senate in February 2006.

The Jewish American Heritage Month Coalition states that, "JAHM also enables the exploration of the meaning of religious pluralism, cultural diversity, and participation in American civic culture."

According to Library of Congress hosted website, JewishHeritageMonth.gov, May was chosen as the month of Jewish American Heritage Month because of the successful 350th Anniversary Celebration of Jews in America marking the Jewish arrival in New Amsterdam.

In 2020, the National Museum of American Jewish History successfully pivoted Jewish American Heritage Month to online programming and launched a website with the support of more than 50 organizations around the country, forging ahead even in the era of COVID-19.

== Celebration and recognition ==
JAHM has been recognized in Madison Square Garden in New York City and in some Jewish museums. Some institutions, including the Library of Congress, have included shorter periods within the month for special lectures, programs, or displays, such as the Library of Congress "Jewish Heritage Week" lecture series.

A similar month exists in Florida as Florida Jewish History Month but it occurs in January.

=== 2010 White House reception ===
On May 10, 2010, the White House issued a press release noting that:

The month serves as an opportunity to highlight and celebrate the range and depth of Jewish American heritage and contributions to American culture, with guests representing the many walks of life that have helped weave the fabric of American history. Invitees include a range of community leaders and prominent Jewish Americans from Olympians and professional athletes to members of Congress, business leaders, scholars, military veterans, and astronauts.

At the May 27, 2010 reception, President Obama welcomed the invited guests, which included "members of the House and Senate, two justices of the Supreme Court, Olympic athletes, entrepreneurs, Rabbinical scholars", and he made special mention of Sandy Koufax, famous in the Jewish community for refusing to play baseball on Yom Kippur. He praised "the diversity of talents and accomplishments" that the Jewish community had brought to the United States since pre-Revolutionary times, saying that, "Even before we were a nation, we were a sanctuary for Jews seeking to live without the specter of violence or exile," from the time "a band of 23 Jewish refugees to a place called New Amsterdam more than 350 years ago."

=== 2011 White House reception ===
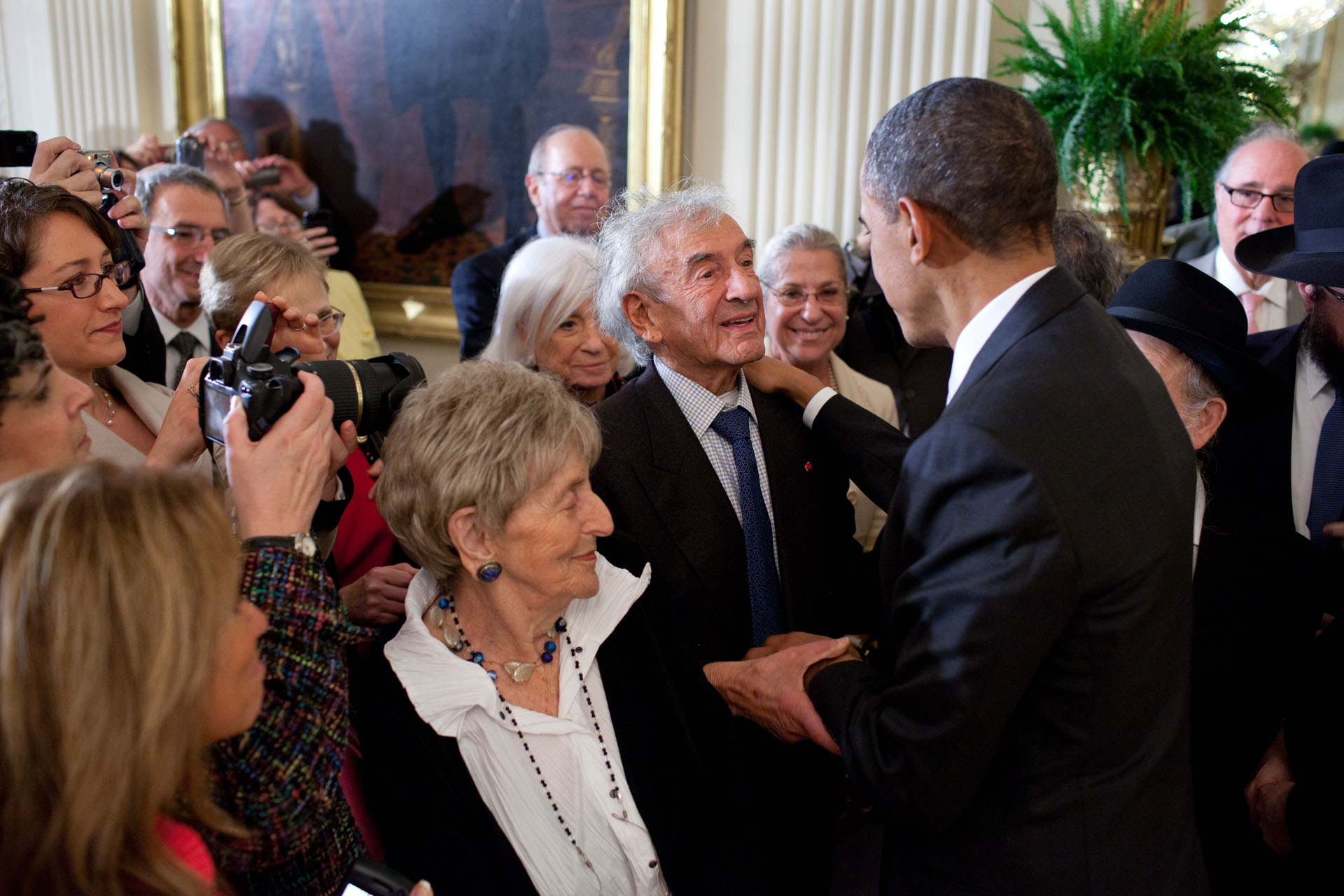
President Obama welcomes Nobel Peace Prize Laureate Elie Wiesel at the May 17, 2011 White House reception in honor of JAHM.

President Obama scheduled a second White House reception in honor of JAHM for May 17, 2011. The Jewish Telegraphic Agency (JTA) reported that it was "less formal than the inaugural one last year, with brief remarks and a small Marine Corps band playing klezmer music." The President noted the presence, among others, of Nobel Peace Prize Laureate Elie Wiesel, and Representative Debbie Wasserman Schultz, newly appointed as Chair of the Democratic National Committee.

President Obama noted that Jewish Americans "persevered despite unspeakable discrimination and adversity at times." Despite the challenges they faced, the President noted their achievements in "the arts, science, the military, business and industry, and in public and community service." In his remarks, he said:

This month is a chance for Americans of every faith to appreciate the contributions of the Jewish people throughout our history –- often in the face of unspeakable discrimination and adversity. For hundreds of years, Jewish Americans have fought heroically in battle and inspired us to pursue peace. They've built our cities, cured our sick. They've paved the way in the sciences and the law, in our politics and in the arts. They remain our leaders, our teachers, our neighbors and our friends. Not bad for a band of believers who have been tested from the moment that they came together and professed their faith. The Jewish people have always persevered. And that's why today is about celebrating the people in this room, the thousands who came before, the generations who will shape the future of our country and the future of the world.

A Marine Corps band playing klezmer music, and the "Maccabeats," a Yeshiva University a cappella group, provided entertainment.

=== 2015 Presidential synagogue visit ===
In addition to signing the proclamation marking May 2015 as the annual Jewish American Heritage Month, the White House shared plans for an address by President Obama on May 22, 2015, at Adas Israel Congregation, a large Washington, D.C. synagogue. The date of the visit coincided with "Solidarity Sabbath," a Lantos Foundation for Human Rights and Justice initiative asking world leaders to show support for the fight against anti-semitism.

== JAHM Coalition ==
Since 2006, JAHM programs have taken place across the country, but in March 2007 the JAHM Coalition was formed and convened by United Jewish Communities (now The Jewish Federations of North America), The Jacob Rader Marcus Center of the American Jewish Archives, the Jewish Women's Archive (JWA), (AJA) and the American Jewish Historical Society (AJHS), to encourage and support future programs. The JAHM Coalition is composed of the directors of major national Jewish historical and cultural organizations including the AJA, AJHS, JWA, the National Museum of American Jewish History, the Council of American Jewish Museums (CAJM), Jewish Museum of Florida, and the Jewish Historical Society of Greater Washington. In 2009, the Coalition named a national coordinator.

== JAHM Today ==
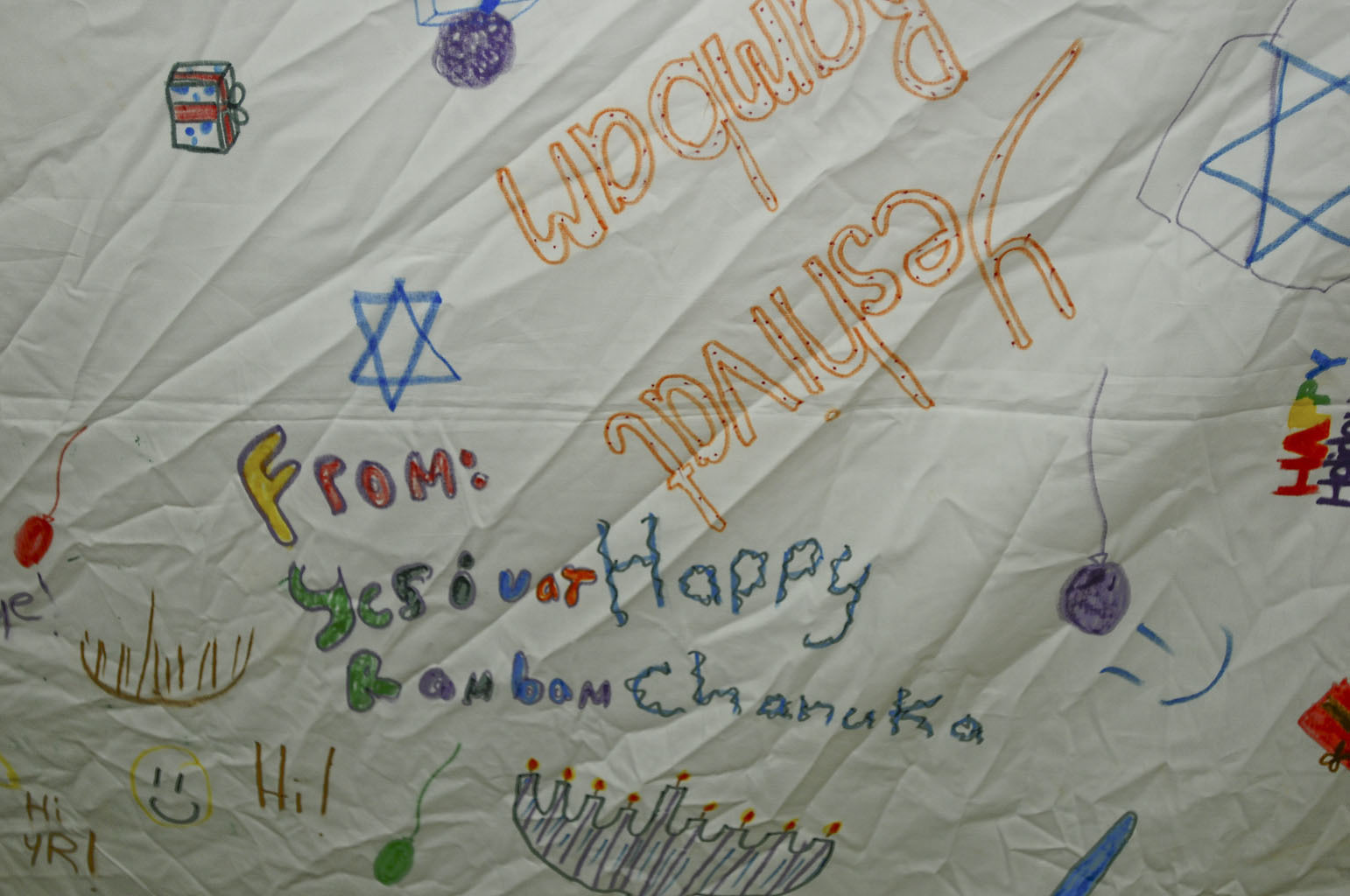
Colorful mural made by a Jewish elementary school in the United States and displayed during a May 2010 Jewish American Heritage Month celebration. Photo removed online by Trump administration in 2025.

Jewish American Heritage Month is organized annually by the National Museum of American Jewish History as a nationwide celebration.

As of 2025, the UJA-Federation of New York has provided major new funding for JAHM, the coalition of groups involved has grown to encompass the UJA-Federation of New York, Artists Against Antisemitism, the American Association of School Librarians (AASL), and the Conference of Presidents of many other American Jewish Organizations, among others. The UJA's support has allowed JAHM to focus on educational programming for schools, library grants, and signature events to reach a broader audience.

On January 20, 2025, the Trump administration's Initial Rescissions Of Harmful Executive Orders And Actions eliminated federal recognition of the month. Nonetheless, on May 16, 2025, the proclamation was issued after all.

== See also ==
- Jewish Americans
- List of Jewish members of the United States Congress
- South Florida Jewish Community
- White House Hanukkah Party
- Jewish Heritage Month
