= Aleph Institute =

Jewish humanitarian organization

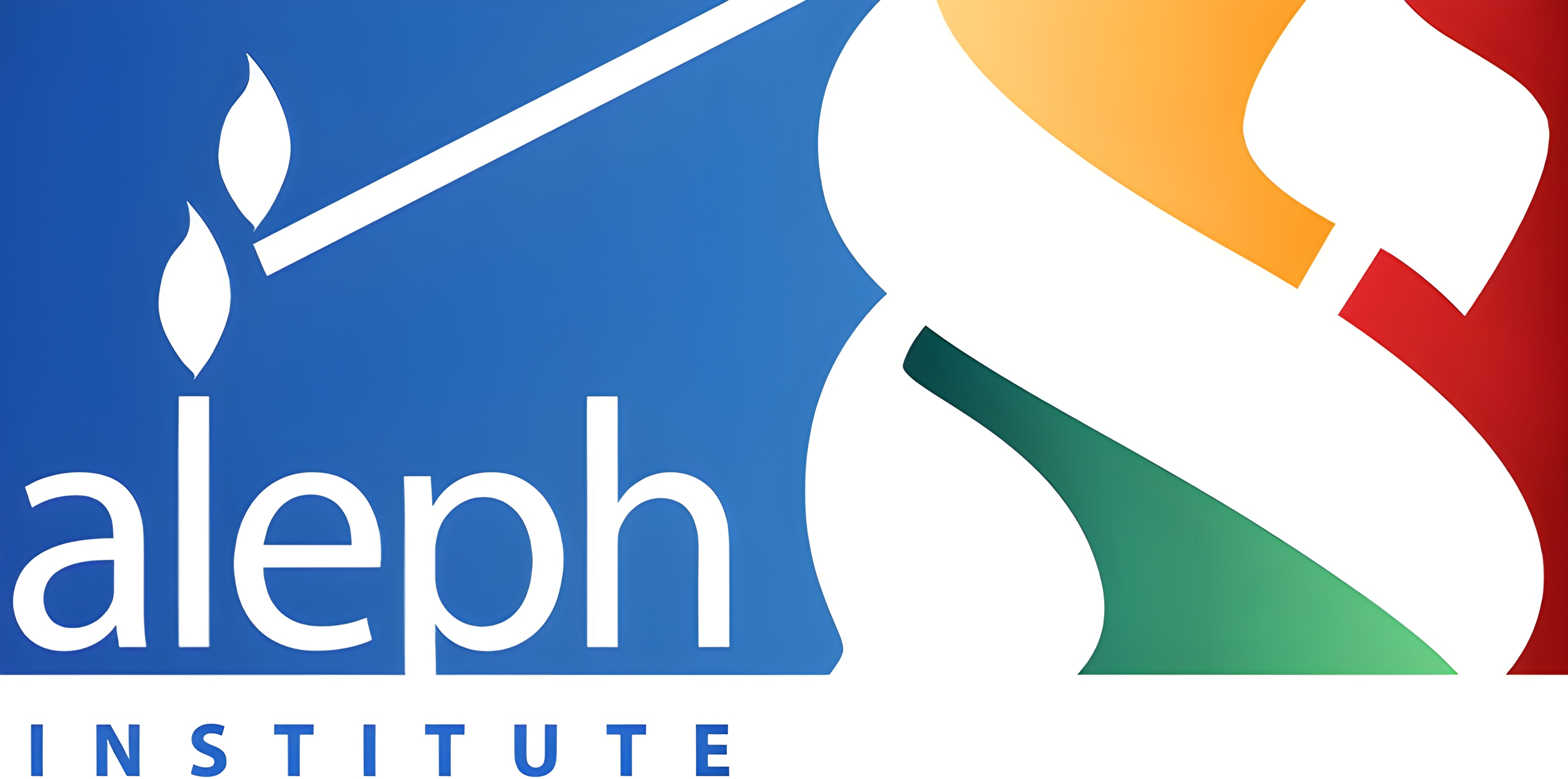
- Formation: 1981
- Founder: Sholom Lipskar
- Purpose: Prison, military, and family programs
- Headquarters: The Shul of Bal Harbour (Surfside, Florida)
- Key people: CEO Rabbi Aaron Lipskar; Rabbi Mendy Katz
- Website: aleph-institute.org

The Aleph Institute is an American non-profit organization affiliated with the Chabad-Lubavitch movement that provides support services to the approximately 85,000 Jews in the U.S. prison system and Jewish members of the U.S. military located in the United States and deployed abroad.

== Prison programs ==
Aleph's prison programs focus on assisting Jewish inmates during their prison stay as well as helping them reintegrate into society once released. Aleph helps them observe the Jewish holidays and assist them with their daily Jewish practices, books, food items and materials holidays and daily Jewish practices. Aleph also has a summer visitation program which sends Rabbinical students around the US visiting over 3,000 Jewish inmates.

=== Advocacy ===
The institute has intervened on behalf of Jewish prisoners, in the United States and abroad. For example, the institute connected Jacob Ostreicher, a Jewish businessman arrested in Bolivia in 2011 for purportedly money laundering, with actor Sean Penn. Penn made a direct appeal to Bolivian President Evo Morales on Ostreicher's behalf. Ostreicher was released in 2013 and credited the Aleph Institute with helping to secure his release.

In 2010, Aleph Institute joined 200 Jewish organizations petitioning then Governor Charlie Crist for a stay of execution on behalf of Martin Grossman who was convicted of the 1984 killing of a law enforcement officer. Pope Benedict XVI also sent a personal request to commute the sentence but the execution proceeded in 2010.

== Military programs ==
Aleph assists with the spiritual needs of Jews serving in the U.S. Armed Forces by providing Jewish books as well as moral and spiritual support. Aleph also distributes special holiday packages to soldiers for Jewish holidays to Army, Navy, Air Force and Marine bases.

== European Aleph Institute ==
The European Aleph Institute was founded in 2005 and based in Brussels to ensure the religious rights of the estimated 3,500 to 5,000 Jews imprisoned in Europe. The institute arranges for prisoners to be provided with kosher meals, religious texts and ceremonial objects, as well as counseling, education, and financial support to families of prisoners. The expressed intent is to avoid recidivism.
