= The Shul of Bal Harbour =

Synagogue in Surfside, Florida, United States

- Location of the synagogue in Florida

Religion
- Affiliation: Hasidic Judaism
- Rite: Chabad-Lubavitch; Nusach Ashkenaz
- Ecclesiastical or organizational status: Synagogue
- Leadership: Rabbi Sholom Lipskar
- Status: Active

Location
- Location: 9540 Collins Ave, Surfside, Miami-Dade County, South Florida
- Country: United States
- Interactive map of The Shul of Bal Harbour
- Coordinates: 25°53′09″N 80°07′22″W

Architecture
- Established: 1969 (as a congregation)
- Completed: 1994
- Interior area: 11,600 m^{2} (125,000 sq ft)

Website
- theshul.org

The Shul of Bal Harbour is a Chabad-Lubavitch Hasidic Jewish congregation and synagogue, located in Surfside, in the Miami-Dade County of South Florida, in the United States. In 2009, the congregation was named by Newsweek as one of America's 25 most vibrant congregations.

== History ==
The Shul was founded by Rabbi Sholom Lipskar, who was sent in 1969 as an emissary of the Chabad-Lubavitch Rebbe, Rabbi Menachem M. Schneerson, to Miami Beach, Florida.

After finding no active Jewish community in the Surfside area, Lipskar initially met in hotel rooms before moving to a storefront.

In the early 1980s, Surfside was not welcoming to Jews with real-estate agents refusing to deal with Jewish clients. In 1982 the local Bal Harbor Club dropped its policy banning Jewish and Black people after a discrimination lawsuit.

The Shul moved to its current site in 1987.

The Shul has hosted dignitaries including Florida Governor Ron DeSantis, Argentine President Javier Milei, and Prime Minister of Israel Benjamin Netanyahu.

== Building ==
The synagogue building was opened in 1994, in time for Rosh Hashanah, and cost $9 million, and is 3,200 m^{2} (34,000 sq ft) in area. The building is colonnaded and the design resembles ancient Jerusalem sandstone.

In 2016, The Shul announced a 3,700 m^{2} (40,000 sq ft) expansion at the cost of $20 million to be finished in two years. The expansion included an all-glass wall 12 m (40 ft) high social hall with glass ceilings accommodating crowds of up to 700 people.

== Membership and services ==
The congregation membership has 700 families representing 3,000 people. Programming includes adult education, programs for Latin American Jewry, early childhood, and five daily minyans.

The Shul is also the headquarters for the Aleph Institute, an organization assisting Jewish prisoners and military personnel, also founded by Lipskar.

After the Surfside condominium collapse, The Shul raised over $500,000 for families of the victims and distributed aid to displaced community members.

== See also ==
- History of the Jews in South Florida
- History of the Jews in the United States
- List of synagogues in the United States
