= Baker's Haulover Inlet =

Ocean inlet in Florida, US

Coordinates: 25°53′59″N 80°07′26″W

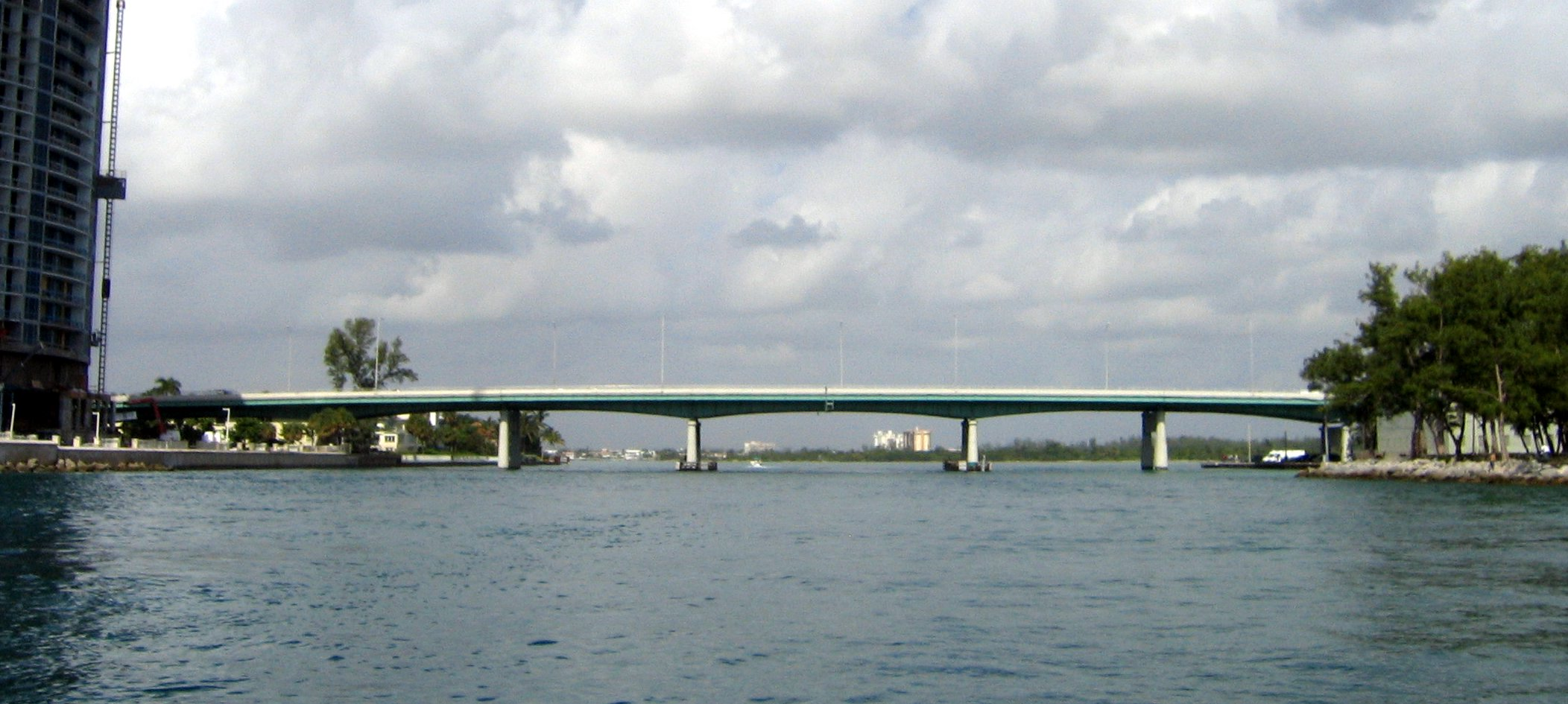
Baker's Haulover Inlet as viewed when approaching from the Atlantic Ocean side.

Baker's Haulover Inlet, more commonly known simply as Haulover inlet, is a man-made channel in Miami-Dade County, Florida, connecting the northern end of Biscayne Bay with the Atlantic Ocean. The inlet was cut in 1925 through a narrow point in the sand between the cities of Bal Harbour and Sunny Isles. It is the location of an official nude beach, recreation areas and marina in the 99-acre (40-hectare) Haulover Park. A fixed bridge carries State Road A1A across the inlet.

The name appeared on maps as early as 1823.

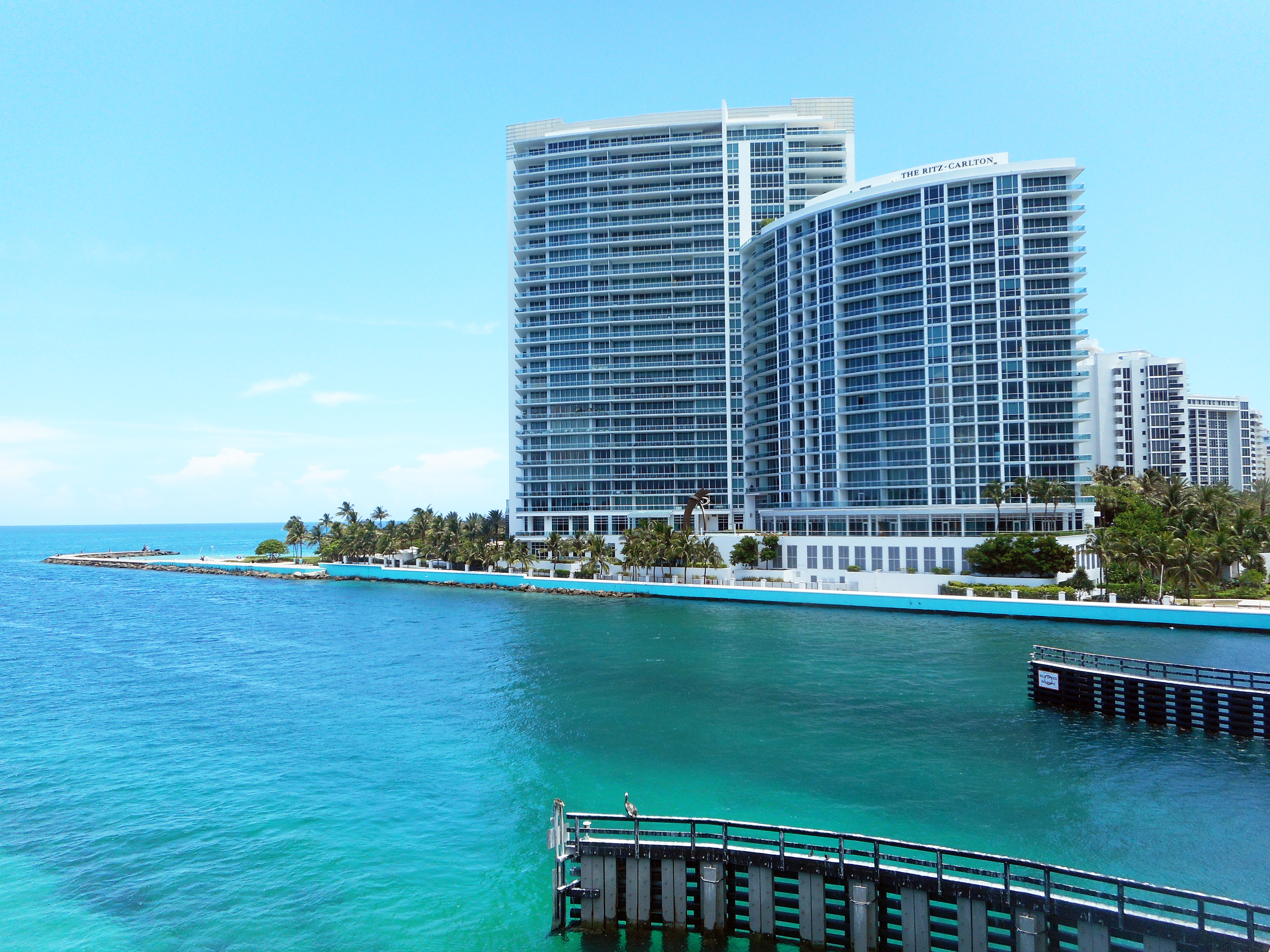
View of Biscayne Bay from bridge over inlet

There is a State of Florida Historical Landmark Marker at the original Lighthouse Dock site dedicated on February 21, 2004, to the first charter-boat captains at the 1926–1951 dock. It is the only marker in the State of Florida for a fishing dock.

Haulover Inlet is notorious for its combination of wind, dangerous tides, and natural obstacles, which can cause large waves that threaten to swamp unprepared boats.
