= Leonard Abess =

American banker and businessman

- Born: Leonard L. Abess; 1948 (age 77–78)
- Occupation: Banker

Leonard L. Abess (born 1948) is an American banker, businessman, and former owner of the City National Bank of Florida, the second-largest financial institution in Florida with over $22 billion in assets as of 2018. CNBFL has 32 branches, from Miami-Dade County to the greater Orlando area, and nearly 1,000 employees.

== Early life and education ==
Abess' father, Leonard, was the son of Romanian Jewish parents who moved from Providence, Rhode Island, to Miami to work as an independent auditor at the First National Bank of Florida. His mother, Bertha (née Ungar), was the daughter of Arthur Ungar, a Miami automobile dealer and founder of the Temple Israel of Greater Miami.

In 1946, Abess's father co-founded (with Baron de Hirsch Meyer) the City National Bank of Florida, one of the first postwar banks in the region. In 1949, after local hospitals refused to hire Jewish doctors, Leonard Sr. and other Jewish residents of South Florida pooled their resources and founded the Mount Sinai Medical Center in Miami Beach. Abess Jr. graduated from The Wharton School of the University of Pennsylvania. He started his career at the bank in its print shop.

== Career ==
Abess became the majority owner and chairman of the City National Bank in 1984. The bank had $400 million in assets when he purchased it, which had grown to $2.75 billion at the time of its sale in 2008.

In November 2008, Abess sold his 83 percent share of the bank to the Caja Madrid banking group for $927 million and shared $60 million of the proceeds with 399 current staff members and 72 former employees. On February 24, 2009, President Barack Obama praised Abess in his State of the Union Address and invited Abess and another bank employee to be his guests at the speech. Abess was later recognized as one of Time magazine's "Time 100" in 2009.

Leonard Abess is a former director of the Miami Branch of the Federal Reserve Bank.

== Philanthropy ==
Abess serves as a University of Miami trustee and, in 2006, donated $5 million to establish the University of Miami's Abess Center for Ecosystem Science and Policy.

Abess and his wife also founded a floating research station in the Brazilian Amazon and the Abess Center for Environmental Studies at Miami Country Day School.

In 2007, the Miami Chamber of Commerce honored Abess and his wife Jayne with their "Sand in My Shoes Award." In 2006, the Miami Beach Chamber of Commerce gave him its "Doc Baker Lifetime Achievement Award."

From 2011 until 2014, Abess served as chairman of the University of Miami's board of trustees.
