= Bal Harbour, Florida =

- Village
- Village of Bal Harbour
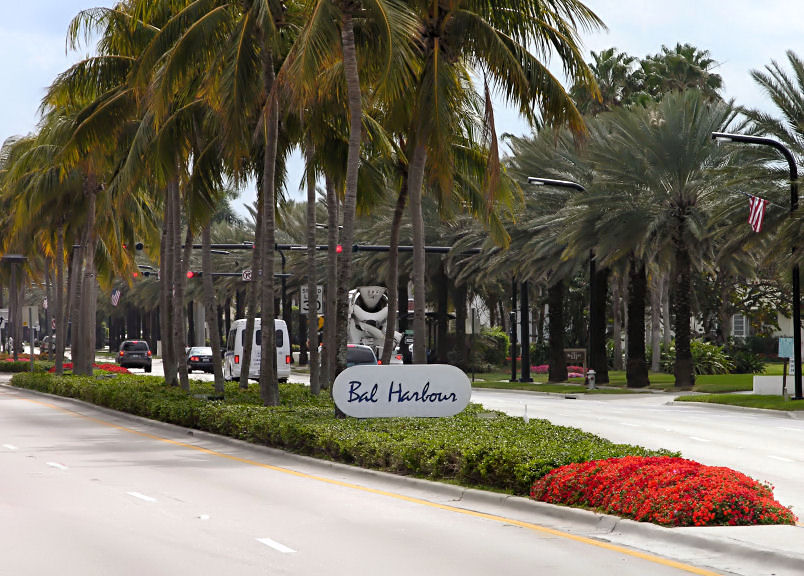
- Collins Avenue in Bal Harbour

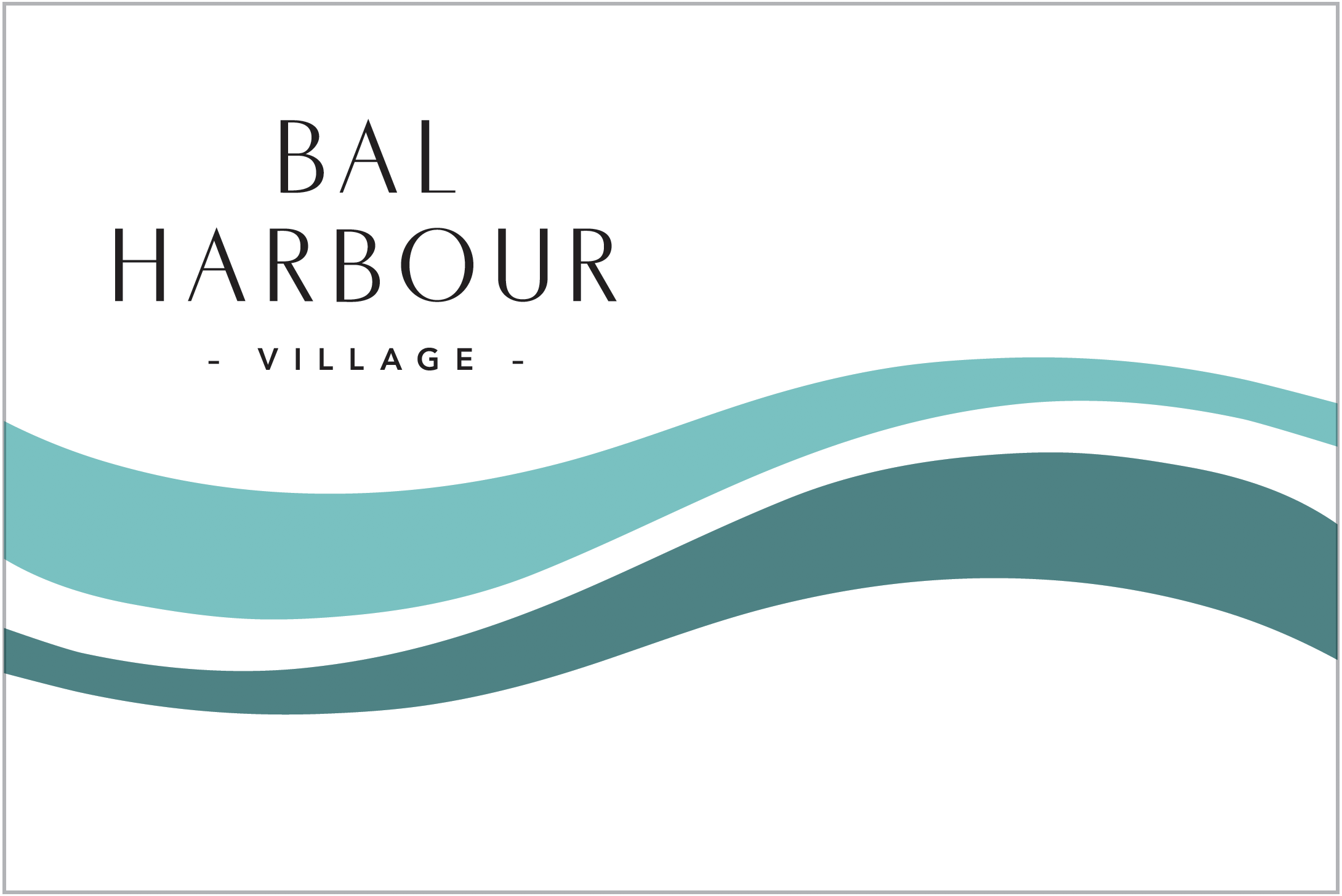
- Flag

- Location of Bal Harbour in Miami-Dade County, Florida

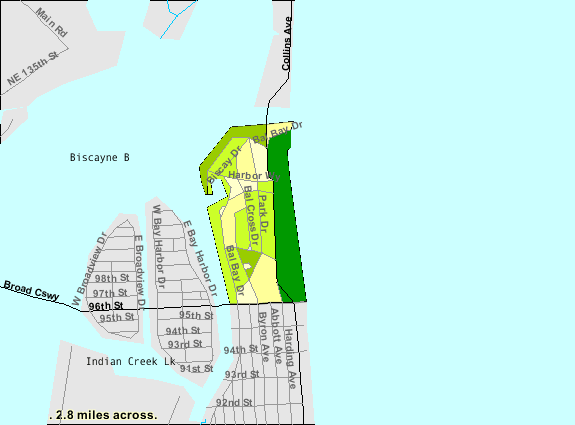
- U.S. Census Bureau map showing village boundaries
- Coordinates: 25°53′42″N 80°07′26″W
- Country: United States
- State: Florida
- County: Miami-Dade
- Founded (Bay Harbour): 1930s
- Incorporated (Bal Harbour): August 14, 1946
- Reincorporated (Village of Bal Harbour): June 16, 1947

Government
  - Type: Council-Manager
  - Mayor: Seth E. Salver
  - Vice Mayor: David Wolf
  - Commissioners: Jeffrey P. Freimark; Buzzy Sklar; Alejandro Levy
  - Village Manager: Jorge M. Gonzalez
  - Town Clerk: Juan D. Garcia

Area
  - Total: 0.64 sq mi (1.66 km^{2})
  - Land: 0.38 sq mi (0.99 km^{2})
  - Water: 0.26 sq mi (0.67 km^{2})
- Elevation: 3 ft (0.91 m)

Population (2020)
  - Total: 3,093
  - Density: 8,067.8/sq mi (3,115.01/km^{2})
- Time zone: UTC−05 (Eastern (EST))
  - Summer (DST): UTC−04 (EDT)
- ZIP code: 33154
- Area codes: 305, 786, 645
- FIPS code: 12-03275
- GNIS feature ID: 2078834
- Website: balharbourfl.gov

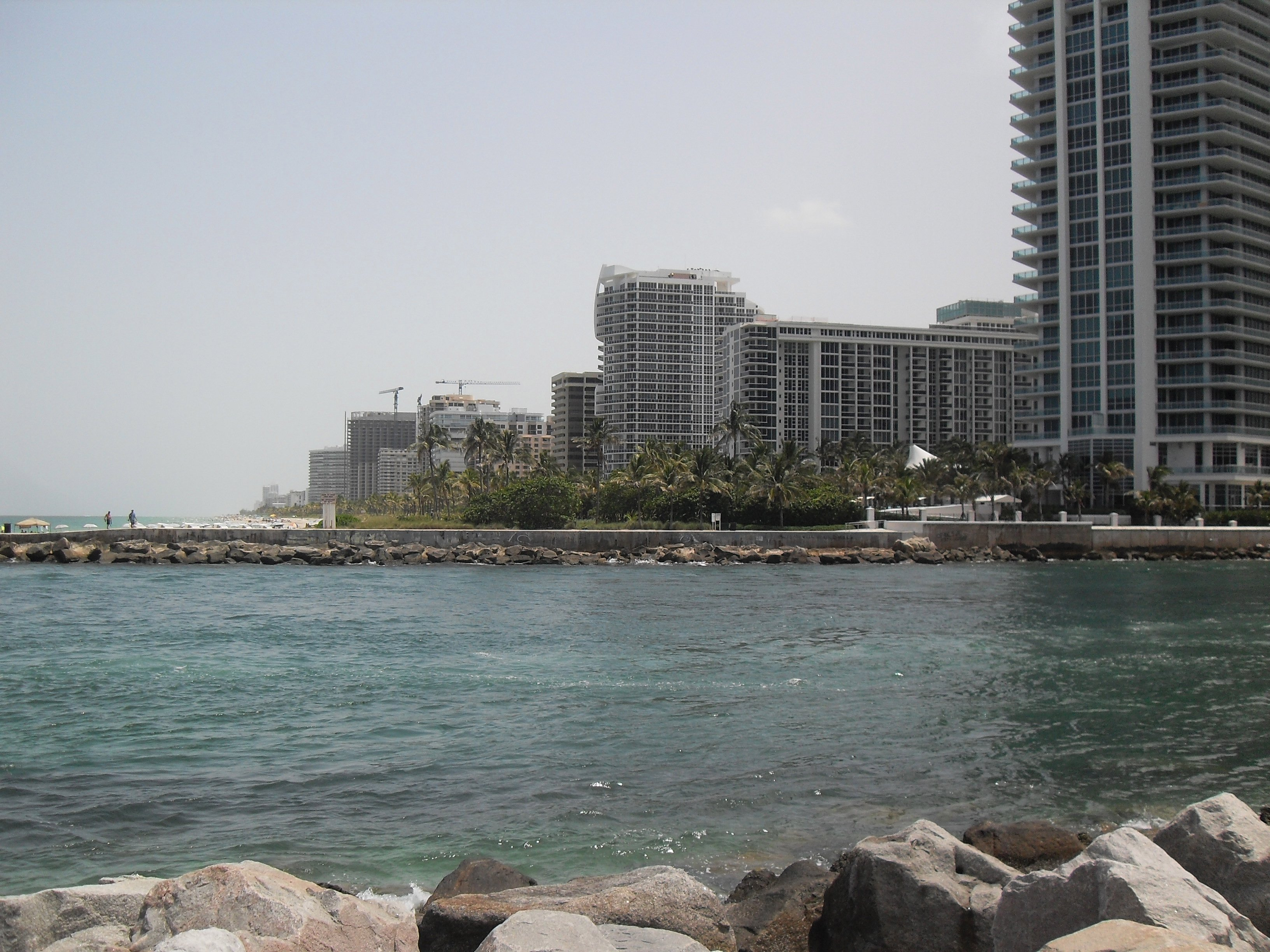
View on Bal Harbour from the north across Baker's Haulover Inlet

Bal Harbour or Bal Harbor Beach is a village in Miami-Dade County, Florida. The village is part of the Miami metropolitan area of South Florida. The population was 3,093 at the 2020 US Census.

== History ==
Since the 1920s, the Detroit-based Miami Beach Heights Corporation—headed by industrialists Robert C. Graham, Walter O. Briggs, and Carl G. Fisher—owned 245 acres (99 ha) of undeveloped, partially swampy land that stretched from Biscayne Bay to the Atlantic Ocean. Graham assumed the duties as the developer for Bal Harbour. In the 1930s, city planners Harland Bartholomew & Associates were called in to design the village. The company made several plans, and they were submitted to the Miami Beach Heights for review.

The original name chosen for Bal Harbour was Bay Harbour. However, the planning committee did not think that was appropriate for a village that was on the beach. A name was invented to encompass a village that ran from the bay to the Atlantic Ocean. The b was taken from the word bay and the a and l were taken from the name Atlantic Ocean. Hence the word Bal was created.

In 1940, World War II began, and the plans were put on hold. As a goodwill gesture to the government, Robert C. Graham rented the land to the United States Air Corps for $1 per year. The Air Corps used this land to train their soldiers and established a Prisoner of War camp. The ocean front area was used as a rifle range and the barracks were set up on the west side of Collins Avenue. The camp for prisoners was located on the site of what would become the Bal Harbour Shops.

After the war ended, the U.S. Air Corps left the barracks intact, which were converted into apartment homes by Graham in 1946.

In order to incorporate as a municipality in 1946, there had to be at least 25 male registered voters residing in the area. Graham had twenty five families move into the apartment homes that he had converted in order to qualify Bal Harbour for incorporation. He then hired Willard Webb, a Miami Beach tax assessor, to draft a charter for the village. After the charter was completed by Graham and 25 male registered voters, the Village of Bal Harbour was officially incorporated on August 14, 1946. The village was operated under the village council-manager form of government. The council established a volunteer fire department.

Swampland was filled, seawalls were constructed and the yacht basin was created. Contracts were signed for the sewer systems, water pumping stations and utilities. Bal Harbour was the first planned community in Florida to have its utilities placed underground. Developers set guidelines for the development of the beachfront and the residential areas. Collins Avenue was paved into four lanes with a landscaped median and later widened to the present day six lanes. Village plans indicated that ocean front property was to be 200 feet (61 m) deep and lots approached $100,000. Lots in the residential area were about 1,800 square feet (170 m^{2}) and cost from $6,500 to $20,000.

The first hotel, "The Kenilworth By-the-Sea", was built by Tom Raffington and made famous by Arthur Godfrey. It has since been demolished and is now the Kenilworth Condominium. The first home was built at 160 Bal Cross Drive by Robert C. Graham Jr., who was the son of Bal Harbour Developer Robert C. Graham. Construction for the Sea View Hotel was started.

Bal Harbour was reincorporated by a special act of the 1947 Florida Legislature and its own charter was issued June 16, 1947. This new charter supplemented the original incorporation under the General Laws of Florida. In accordance with the new charter, an election to select five to serve on the council was held June 30, 1947. The Council elected were: Edward L. Bonneau, Robert C. Graham Jr., Glenn E. Massnick, George Whittaker, and Judge Julien Southerland. Judge Southerland was chosen as mayor. Willard Webb, who had been acting manager since the first organization, was appointed as village manager. Mary Wetterer was named village clerk and Herold Dickey was appointed chief of police.

In 1947, the Church by the Sea was built. In 1948, the Beach Club was built. Its restaurant was operated by Howard Johnson's. In 1949, a new bridge was started over Baker's Haulover Inlet. In 1956, the current village hall was built.

In 1956, the Hotel Americana was built. It became the Sheraton Hotel in 1980. It was imploded on November 18, 2007, to build a set of condos and a luxury aparthotel as the St. Regis Bal Harbour.

In 1959, Bal Harbour's beach was renovated due to severe erosion.

In 1965, the Bal Harbour Shops was built by the Whitman family. Stanley Whitman, one of the residents responsible for the village's incorporation, lived with his family in the barrack apartments.

In 1971, Bal Harbour's started a major beach replenishment project.

In 1984, the residents of an exclusive neighborhood club in Bal Harbour were successfully sued to remove the clause preventing Jewish and Black people from owning property there.

In 2008, The new Regent Bal Harbour opened, becoming the northern gateway to the village. In 2012, The last oceanfront undeveloped Beach Club site was sold for $220 million in order to make way to the ultra luxury Oceana at Bal Harbour. In 2014, The Ritz-Carlton Bal Harbour, Miami opened at the former Regent Bal Harbour and ONE Bal Harbour Resort & Spa.

In 2015, it was reported in the press that "the Bal Harbour Police and the Glades County Sheriff set up a giant money laundering scheme, but it all fell apart when federal investigators and the Miami Herald found strange things going on."

From 2015 onward, Bal Harbour has become known globally as a luxury enclave. In the words of Town & Country, Bal Harbour is the "ne plus ultra" of South Florida luxury. Bal Harbour's resort tax committee, has invested in developing its reputation as a luxury destination. The committee collects a specific tax which "must be used for among other tourism related activities, for the enhancement of tourism, publicity and advertising purposes." As the result of an international destination marketing effort from 2014 to 2019 by the village, per capita resort tax revenues for the Village of Bal Harbour grew by 35%.

== Geography ==
According to the United States Census Bureau, the village has a total area of 0.6 square miles (1.6 km^{2}). 0.3 square miles (0.78 km^{2}) of it is land and 0.2 square miles (0.52 km^{2}) of it (42.37%) is water.

Bal Harbour, Florida is located on the northern tip of the barrier island commonly referred to as Miami Beach, named after the island's most prominent town of Miami Beach. Bal Harbour is the northernmost barrier island in a chain that extends southward up to and including Key West, Florida.

The main traffic corridor running south to north through Bal Harbour is Collins Avenue, also demarked as Florida State Highway A1A.

A channel between the north end of Biscayne Bay and the Atlantic Ocean runs across the northern end of Bal Harbour.

A bridge, maintained by the State of Florida connects Bal Harbour to Haulover Park, to the north. Haulover Park is maintained by the Miami Dade Parks Commission.

=== Surrounding areas ===
Unincorporated Miami-Dade County (Haulover Park)
Biscayne Bay Atlantic Ocean
Bay Harbor Islands Atlantic Ocean
Bay Harbor Islands Atlantic Ocean
Surfside

== Demographics ==
Historical population
Census	Pop.	Note	%±
1950	224		—
1960	727		224.6%
1970	2,038		180.3%
1980	2,973		45.9%
1990	3,045		2.4%
2000	3,305		8.5%
2010	2,513		−24.0%
2020	3,093		23.1%
U.S. Decennial Census

=== 2020 census ===
As of the 2020 census, Bal Harbour had a population of 3,093. The median age was 55.8 years. 12.8% of residents were under the age of 18 and 34.9% were 65 years of age or older. For every 100 females, there were 92.6 males, and for every 100 females age 18 and over, there were 88.8 males.

As of 2020, 100.0% of residents lived in urban areas, while 0.0% lived in rural areas.

In 2020, there were 1,521 households in Bal Harbour, of which 17.4% had children under the age of 18 living in them. Of all households, 46.8% were married-couple households, 18.8% were households with a male householder and no spouse or partner present, and 31.0% were households with a female householder and no spouse or partner present. About 36.7% of all households were made up of individuals, and 20.6% had someone living alone who was 65 years of age or older.

In 2020, there were 3,507 housing units, of which 56.6% were vacant. The homeowner vacancy rate was 3.0% and the rental vacancy rate was 9.3%.

Bal Harbour racial composition (Hispanics excluded from racial categories) (NH = Non-Hispanic)
Race	Number	Percentage
White (NH)	2,036	65.83%
Black or African American (NH)	32	1.03%
Native American or Alaska Native (NH)	1	0.03%
Asian (NH)	46	1.49%
Pacific Islander or Native Hawaiian (NH)	0	0.00%
Some other race (NH)	29	0.94%
Two or more races/Multiracial (NH)	120	3.88%
Hispanic or Latino	829	26.80%
Total	3,093	100.00%

The 2016-2020 American Community Survey 5-year estimates reported 720 families residing in the village.

=== 2010 census ===
Bal Harbour Demographics
2010 Census	Bal Harbour	Miami-Dade County	Florida
Total population	2,513	2,496,435	18,801,310
Population, percent change, 2000 to 2010	−24.0%	+10.8%	+17.6%
Population density	6,492.1/sq mi	1,315.5/sq mi	350.6/sq mi
White or Caucasian (including White Hispanic)	95.0%	73.8%	75.0%
(Non-Hispanic White or Caucasian)	68.1%	15.4%	57.9%
Black or African-American	2.1%	18.9%	16.0%
Hispanic or Latino (of any race)	28.7%	65.0%	22.5%
Asian	0.9%	1.5%	2.4%
Native American or Native Alaskan	0.1%	0.2%	0.4%
Pacific Islander or Native Hawaiian	0.0%	0.0%	0.1%
Two or more races (Multiracial)	1.1%	2.4%	2.5%
Some Other Race	0.8%	3.2%	3.6%

As of the 2010 United States census, there were 2,513 people, 1,366 households, and 637 families residing in the village.

=== 2000 census ===
In 2000, 9.2% had children under the age of 18 living with them, 36.1% were married couples living together, 4.8% had a female householder with no husband present, and 57.4% were non-families. 50.7% of all households were made up of individuals, and 24.9% had someone living alone who was 65 years of age or older. The average household size was 1.73 and the average family size was 2.49.

In 2000, the village population was spread out, with 10.2% under the age of 18, 3.7% from 18 to 24, 24.0% from 25 to 44, 24.7% from 45 to 64, and 37.5% who were 65 years of age or older. The median age was 55 years. For every 100 females, there were 75.8 males. For every 100 females age 18 and over, there were 73.6 males.

In 2000, the median income for a household in the village was $47,148, and the median income for a family was $83,570. Males had a median income of $51,227 versus $44,500 for females. The per capita income for the village was $67,680. About 5.6% of families and 9.2% of the population were below the poverty line, including 10.5% of those under age 18 and 6.7% of those age 65 or over. This data only reflects reported income, not overall wealth.

As of 2000, speakers of English as a first language accounted for 58.29% of residents, while Spanish was at 35.14%, Polish at 2.63%, French 2.13%, Portuguese 0.99%, and Russian made up 0.82% of the population.

== Education ==
Miami-Dade County Public Schools is the local school district.

Ruth K. Broad/Bay Harbor K–8 Center in Bay Harbor Islands serves as the local elementary and K–8 school. Residents who want to have a conventional middle school may instead choose the zoned middle school, Miami Beach Nautilus Middle School. Miami Beach Senior High School is the senior high school serving Surfside.

== Notable people ==
- Micky Arison, owner of Miami Heat and CEO of Carnival Cruise Line.
- Martin Bayerle, treasure hunter, finder of the RMS Republic
- Edith Bouvier Beale, socialite, fashion model and cabaret performer
- Sholom Lipskar, founder of Aleph Institute and The Shul of Bal Harbour.
- Michael Redstone, American entrepreneur and founder of the Northeast Theater Corporation
- Siegmund Spiegel, architect, Holocaust lecturer, and war hero.
