= Hotel Receipts Tax =

Hotel tax in India

Hotel Receipts Tax is a tax in India which is leviable in respect of the chargeable receipts accruing or arising to a hotel in which the room charges per day per individual are ₨ 75 or more. The tax was established in 1981.
