= Surfside, Florida =

Town in the state of Florida, United States

- Town
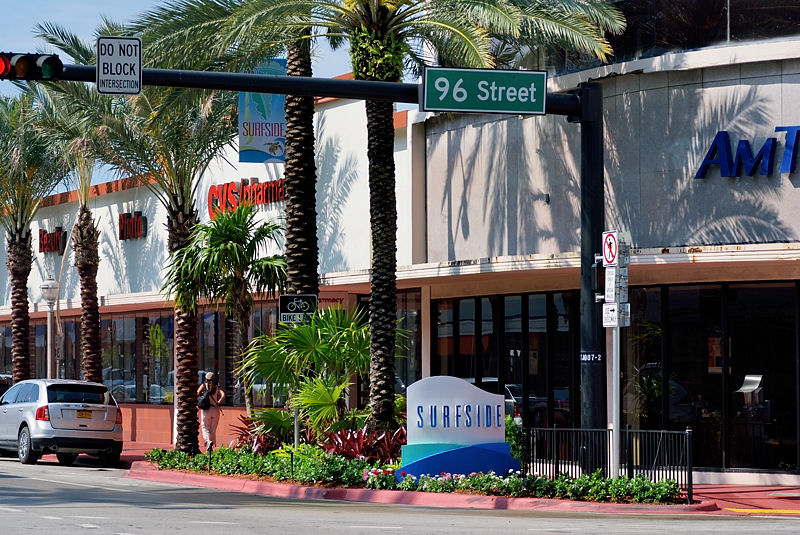
- Harding Avenue commercial district

- Flag Seal

- Location of Surfside in Miami-Dade County, Florida.

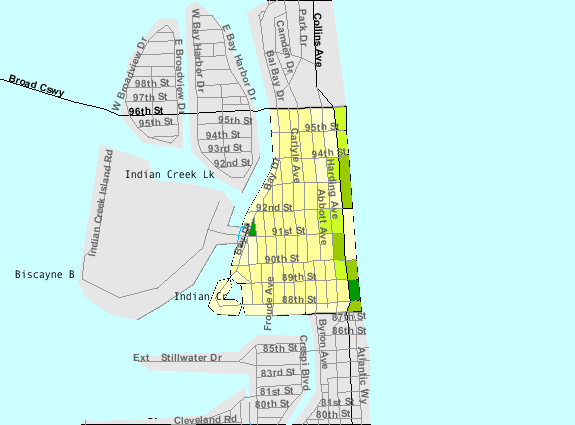
- U.S. Census Bureau map showing town boundaries
- Coordinates: 25°52′36″N 80°07′32″W
- Country: United States
- State: Florida
- County: Miami-Dade
- Founded: May 18, 1935
- Incorporated: May 18, 1935

Government
  - Type: Commission-Manager
  - Mayor: Shlomo Danzinger (R)
  - Vice Mayor: Dayana Benmergui
  - Commissioners: Andrea Travani; David Weingot; Gerardo Vildostegui
  - Town Manager: Mario A. Diaz (Acting)
  - Town Clerk: Sandra N. McCready

Area
  - Total: 0.564 sq mi (1.461 km^{2})
  - Land: 0.558 sq mi (1.444 km^{2})
  - Water: 0.070 sq mi (0.181 km^{2}) 1.9%
- Elevation: 3 ft (0.91 m)

Population (2020)
  - Total: 5,689
  - Estimate (2023): 5,472
  - Density: 9,820/sq mi (3,791/km^{2})
- Time zone: UTC–5 (EST)
  - Summer (DST): UTC–4 (EDT)
- ZIP Code: 33154
- Area codes: 305, 786, and 645
- FIPS code: 12-70075
- GNIS feature ID: 2406695
- Sales tax: 7.0%
- Website: townofsurfsidefl.gov

Surfside is a town in Miami-Dade County, Florida, United States. Surfside is a primarily residential beachside community, with several multistory condominium buildings adjacent to Surfside Beach on the Atlantic Ocean. The town is bordered on the south by the North Beach neighborhood of Miami Beach, on the north by Bal Harbour, on the west by Biscayne Bay, and on the east by the Atlantic Ocean. It also serves as part of the Miami metropolitan area of South Florida. The population was 5,689 as of the 2020 census.

== History ==
Between 1923 and 1925, the Tatum Brothers subdivided the land on what is now Surfside.

Starting in 1924, Henri Levy developed Biscaya Island and a portion of land from 87th to 92nd Streets.

In 1929–1930, Russell Pancoast, built the Surf Club 90th Street and Collins Avenue.

In 1935, fearing annexation by the city of Miami Beach, Florida, 35 members of the privately owned club incorporated the Town of Surfside and financed the venture with a $28,500 loan.

Spearman Lewis was the first mayor of Surfside.

In 1956, Surfside purchased the Lehman Estate on the northeast corner of 93rd Street and Collins Avenue. It acquired additional land via eminent domain and then built a community center.

In 1960, Hawthorne Park was dedicated.

On March 1, 1973, Surfside signed a contract with Miami-Dade County to outsource fire/rescue services.

In 1983, The Shul of Bal Harbour was established at 9540 Collins Avenue.

=== Condominium building collapse ===
On June 24, 2021, at 1:22 a.m. EDT, Champlain Towers South, a 12-story condominium building at 8777 Collins Avenue, partially collapsed, causing 98 deaths, in one of the deadliest structural failures in United States history. The building's 40-year recertification was in progress and the roof was being repaired.

In June 2026, the National Institute of Standards and Technology (NIST) released their final technical findings on what caused the partial collapse. The team concluded the collapse began in early June 2021, when two connections between garage columns and the pool deck failed. This led to the partial collapse of the building on June 24, 2021, when two of the supporting columns in the middle part of the tower catastrophically failed.

== Geography ==
According to the United States Census Bureau, the town has a total area of 0.564 square miles (1.46 km^{2}), of which 0.557 square miles (1.44 km^{2}) is land and 0.007 square miles (0.02 km^{2}) is water.

=== Surrounding areas ===
Bal Harbour
Bay Harbor Islands Atlantic Ocean
Bay Harbor Islands, Indian Creek Atlantic Ocean
Miami Beach Atlantic Ocean
Miami Beach

=== Street names ===
Avenues in Surfside are named for British and American authors and run in alphabetical order from east to west.

In 1979, 95th Street in Surfside was renamed "Isaac Bashevis Singer Boulevard" to reflect the residency of the famous Yiddish author Isaac Bashevis Singer on that street from 1977 until his death in 1991.

== Demographics ==
Historical population
Census	Pop.	Note	%±
1940	295		—
1950	1,852		527.8%
1960	3,157		70.5%
1970	3,614		14.5%
1980	3,763		4.1%
1990	4,108		9.2%
2000	4,909		19.5%
2010	5,744		17.0%
2020	5,689		−1.0%
2023 (est.)	5,472	▼	−3.8%
U.S. Decennial Census; 2020 Census

=== Racial and ethnic composition ===
Surfside, Florida – Racial Composition (NH = Non-Hispanic) Note: the US Census treats Hispanic/Latino as an ethnic category. This table excludes Latinos from the racial categories and assigns them to a separate category. Hispanics/Latinos can be of any race.
Race / Ethnicity	Pop 2010	Pop 2020	% 2010	% 2020
White (NH)	2,880	2,717	50.1%	47.76%
Black or African American (NH)	53	59	0.9%	1.04%
Native American or Alaska Native (NH)	1	2	0.0%	0.04%
Asian (NH)	75	79	1.3%	1.39%
Pacific Islander (NH)	0	3	0.0%	0.05%
Some Other Race (NH)	16	69	0.3%	1.21%
Mixed/Multi-Racial (NH)	46	248	0.8%	4.36%
Hispanic or Latino	2,673	2,512	46.5%	44.16%
Total	5,744	5,689	100.0%	100.00%

=== 2020 census ===
As of the 2020 census, Surfside had a population of 5,689 people, with 2,302 households and 1,551 families residing in the town. The population density was 10,213.6 inhabitants per square mile (3,943.5/km^{2}).

The median age was 45.0 years. 23.0% of residents were under the age of 18 and 22.5% were 65 years of age or older. For every 100 females there were 90.0 males, and for every 100 females age 18 and over there were 87.3 males age 18 and over.

100.0% of residents lived in urban areas, while 0.0% lived in rural areas.

There were 3,675 housing units, of which 37.4% were vacant. The homeowner vacancy rate was 3.5% and the rental vacancy rate was 15.2%.

Of the 2,302 households, 32.1% had children under the age of 18 living in them. Of all households, 51.9% were married-couple households, 16.3% were households with a male householder and no spouse or partner present, and 26.6% were households with a female householder and no spouse or partner present. About 27.4% of all households were made up of individuals, and 13.2% had someone living alone who was 65 years of age or older.

=== 2010 census ===
As of the 2010 census, there were 5,744 people, 2,609 households, and 1,521 families residing in the town. The population density was 10,067.9 inhabitants per square mile (3,887.2/km^{2}). There were 3,890 housing units. The racial makeup of the town was 94.6% White, 1.3% African American, 0.1% Native American, 1.3% Asian, 0.0% Pacific Islander, 1.0% from some other races and 1.7% from two or more races. Hispanic or Latino of any race were 46.5% of the population.

=== Languages ===
As of 2000, Spanish was spoken as a first language by 49.41% of residents, while English was spoken by 42.11% of the population. Other languages spoken included Portuguese 2.36%, Russian 2.04%, German and Yiddish were both tied at 1.40%, and French was the mother tongue for 1.29% of the populace.

=== Jewish population ===
As of 2021, approximately one-third of the population of Surfside are Jews. It is also the most Jewish community in the Miami metropolitan area. Around 2,500 Jews reside in Surfside. Including neighboring areas, 34% of Jews describe themselves as Orthodox, 24% as Conservative, 18% as Reform and 24% as "just Jewish".

In an incident in August 2026, a local resident was arrested and charged with battery with prejudice, after assaulting a Jewish couple in an attack in which he made antisemitic remarks, punched the man in the head and threatened to kill him.

== Education ==
Residents are assigned to Miami-Dade County Public Schools.

Ruth K. Broad/Bay Harbor K–8 Center in Bay Harbor Islands serves as the local elementary and K–8 school. Residents who want to have a conventional middle school may instead choose the zoned middle school, Miami Beach Nautilus Middle School. Miami Beach Senior High School is the senior high school serving Surfside.

== Notable people ==
- Philip B. Hofmann (1909–1986), businessman who was the first non-family-member to serve as chairman and chief executive officer of Johnson & Johnson
- Jared Kushner (born 1981), son-in-law of U.S. President Donald Trump and Senior Advisor to the President between 2017 and 2021
- Rudolph W. Riefkohl (1885–1950), officer in the United States Army
- Isaac Bashevis Singer (1903–1991), Yiddish writer, lived in Surfside from 1977 until his death in 1991
- Sid Tepper (1918–2015), songwriter, lived in Surfside from 1970 to 2004
- Ivanka Trump (born 1981), daughter of U.S. President Donald Trump and Senior Advisor to the President between 2017 and 2021
