= Eastern Shores (North Miami Beach) =

Neighborhood in Florida, United States

Coordinates: 25.934°N 80.136°W

Eastern Shores is a neighborhood within the city of North Miami Beach in Miami-Dade County, Florida, United States. It is located about 12 miles (19 km) north of Miami, just south of the city of Aventura. The sole ZIP code for the neighborhood is 33160. Its entrance is close in front of Oleta River State Park.

== Geography ==
It is located on a peninsula located in the city of North Miami Beach. Eastern Shores is made up of 9 named streets:

- NE 35th Ave (Eastern Shores Blvd)
- NE 164th St, NE 165th Street
- NE 166th Street
- NE 167th Street
- NE 168th Street
- NE 169th Street
- NE 170th Street
- NE 171st Street.

The avenues go from 29th Avenue to 40th Avenue.

The neighborhood is made up of man-made canals, except the natural canal on the north side of NE 171st Street. Eastern Shores is bounded by Sunny Isles Blvd to the south, Maule Lake to the west, The Intracoastal Waterway to the east, and Dumfoundling Bay to the northeast. Eastern Shores is located next to Sunny Isles Beach.

The right side of Eastern Shores (East Side) is full of condominiums and townhouses. Eastern Shores is a gated community. This guardhouse and guard gates were created in 1997. Eastern Shores operates Eastern Shores Fire Rescue station that is located next to the guardhouse. Eastern Shores is located next to the Intracoastal Mall.

== History ==
Eastern Shores was a mangroves wetland, until it was landfilled in the late 1950s.

== Education ==
Eastern Shores is within the Miami-Dade County Public Schools system.

Students attend Norman S. Edelcup/Sunny Isles Beach K-8 in Sunny Isles Beach for elementary and K-8. Residents who want a standard comprehensive middle school instead of a K-8 enroll at a separate middle school, Highland Oaks Middle School. Alonzo and Tracy Mourning Senior High Biscayne Bay Campus is the senior high school. Prior to its opening in 2009, Dr. Michael M. Krop Senior High School served Eastern Shores.
