= Youth Crime Watch of America =

Youth Crime Watch of America, Inc. (YCWA)
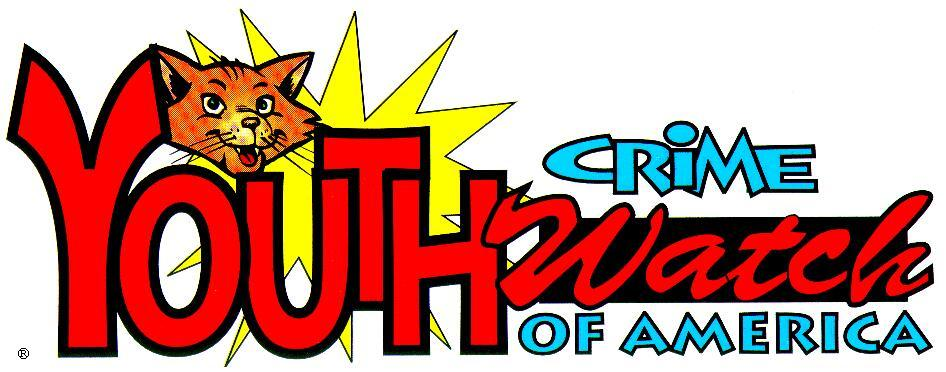
- Abbreviation: YCWA
- Predecessor: Citizen's Crime Watch of Miami-Dade County, Florida
- Formation: 1986; 40 years ago
- Founded at: Miami, Florida, USA
- Type: Non-profit 501(c)(3) organization
- Legal status: Active
- Purpose: To establish Youth Crime Watches across the United States and other countries
- Headquarters: Miami, Florida, U.S.
- Location: Miami, United States
- Origins: Outgrowth of Citizen's Crime Watch of Miami-Dade County, Florida
- Region served: United States and other countries (consider specifying regions with active programs)
- Services: Crime prevention leadership programs for youth
- Fields: Crime prevention youth leadership
- Official language: English
- Affiliations: Sponsored in part by the US Department of Justice; OJJDP

Youth Crime Watch of America, Inc., based in Miami, Florida, is a non profit 501(c)(3) organization dedicated to establishing Youth Crime Watches across the United States and other countries. Sponsored in part by the US Department of Justice, OJJDP, it is a youth-led crime prevention/leadership program.

== Background ==
Youth Crime Watch developed initially in 1979 as an outgrowth of Citizen's Crime Watch of Miami-Dade County, Florida as a direct result of an outraged neighborhood coming together against injustice following the rape of a 12-year-old girl on Halloween night.

The successful pilot Youth Crime Watch program was located in North Miami Beach Senior High School, where it saw much success. In the first year of the program's implementation, students helped to reduce their school's drug problem by more than half by pinpointing drug pushers. In addition, chain snatchings, a prevalent problem at the time, were decreased by seventy-five percent. Equally important was the change in the students' attitudes: they were learning they could make a positive difference in their schools and in their communities. Students were reporting crime, saw positive results and enjoyed significantly improved morale and school spirit.

Youth Crime Watch went national in 1986 with the establishment of Youth Crime Watch of America, Inc. (YCWA), a non-profit organization.
