= Dr. Michael M. Krop Senior High School =

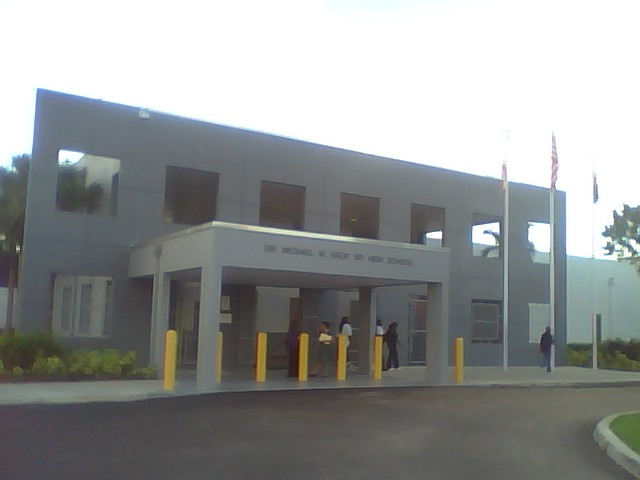
- MKHS' main entrance

Location
- 1410 County Line Road; Miami, Florida 33179; United States; 25.97150°N 80.17350°W

Information
- Type: Public magnet
- Motto: "If you're not lightning, you're not striking. And when lightning strikes, magic happens."
- Established: 1998
- School district: Miami-Dade County Public Schools
- Principal: Lee Krueger
- Teaching staff: 78.00 (FTE)
- Grades: 9-12
- Enrollment: 2,181 (2023-2024)
- Student to teacher ratio: 27.96
- Campus size: 315,000 square feet (29,300 m^{2}) 39.44 acres (159,600 m^{2})
- Campus type: Suburban
- Colors: Black, Silver, Purple, and White
- Mascot: Lightning
- Nickname: Krop Lightning
- Newspaper: The Lightning Strike
- Yearbook: Renaissance
- Website: kropseniorhigh.org

Dr. Michael M. Krop Senior High School is a secondary school located at 1410 County Line Road in Ives Estates, an unincorporated area of north Miami-Dade County (Miami address), Florida, US. However, it serves the city of Aventura, northern fringes of North Miami Beach, and the unincorporated areas around the school such as Ives Estates/California Club and Ojus. The school is located on the Miami-Dade side of the Miami-Dade-Broward County line, and is the northernmost high school in the district. Lee Krueger currently serves as principal.

Krop is considered to be a magnet school because it has a "Students Training in the Arts Repertory (STAR)" program. This magnet program is a visual and performing arts program that is open to students in the greater Miami area. Due to the recession of 2008 and ongoing financial issues, the STAR program has had severe cuts in its funding.

The school gained national attention after one of its students, Trayvon Martin, was killed in a controversial shooting.

== History ==
Built on a former landfill, construction for Dr. Michael M. Krop High School began in 1996, after the Miami-Dade School Board approved plans to build a new high school in North Miami-Dade County to lessen overcrowding in local secondary schools, including North Miami Beach Senior High School. Various secondary schools in northeast Dade were relieved by Krop. When it first opened it had about 1,500 students. Opening its doors in 1998, Krop began with 9th and 10th grades and eventually added 11th and 12th grades; its first graduating class was the class of 2001. At the time of its opening, Krop had a total enrollment of 1,475 students.

In early 1998, before its opening, the naming of the school some controversy, as letters from members of the community indicated a preference for a more generic name. The school is named after Michael M. Krop (1930-2018), an orthodontist who was first elected to the Miami-Dade School Board in 1980. He retired from the board in 2004, after 24 years of service. Former board members Janet McAliley and Betsy Kaplan stated that they would not support renaming the school after him. On February 17, 1998, the city council of Aventura issued a resolution urging the Miami-Dade County school board to name the new high school in northeast Miami-Dade County "Dr. Michael M. Krop High School." The Aventura Marketing Council, which included Krop as a member, and the city of North Miami Beach, also passed resolutions favoring the name change.

When Alonzo and Tracy Mourning Senior High Biscayne Bay Campus opened in 2009, it relieved Krop High. Golden Beach, Sunny Isles Beach, and portions of North Miami Beach were rezoned to Mourning from Krop.

In 2012, even though Krop had a strong academic reputation, some parents in the Aventura area promoted the idea of the city starting a public high school. At the time city council refused to go forward with the idea. However, by 2019 Aventura opened a new charter high school, Don Soffer Aventura High School. Colleen Wright of the Miami Herald stated that the new school could take students who would otherwise attend Krop.

For a period Krop was overcrowded, but by 2019 the building was at 86% capacity as the school had 2,400 students. In 2019, Wright wrote "Krop’s star power has waned with the opening of other high school options, including Alonzo and Tracy Mourning High School and MAST".

== Campus ==
The school, in Ives Estates, is in proximity to the Miami-Dade County-Broward County line. Audra D.S. Burch and Carol Isensee of the Miami Herald described the campus as "sprawling".

In 1998 the north side of the campus had barbed wire. At the time of opening the area roads were dead-ends.

== STAR Academy ==
The STAR Academy is a performing and visual arts program that engenders Krop as a magnet school. Students in the "Students Training in the Arts Repertory (STAR)" program are involved in one or more of its six strands - dance, drama, vocal and instrumental music, visual arts, and television production. Students are accepted into the program through an audition process. Two of the six classes out of a student's yearly class schedule are dedicated to the arts each year.

== The Lightning Strike ==
The Lightning Strike is Krop's monthly student newspaper.

The newspaper was begun in 1998, when the school opened. It is designed using the page layout software Adobe InDesign and photo editing program Adobe Photoshop.

As of the 2005–2006 school year, the paper was converted to color on the front, middle and back, and is 20 pages each issue.

The newspaper is a member of the High School National Ad Network, Florida Scholastic Press Association, National Scholastic Press Association, Columbia Scholastic Press Association, and Quill and Scroll Honor Society.

== Athletics ==
Dr. Michael M. Krop Senior High School has a gymnasium which is used for basketball, volleyball and badminton. The football and baseball fields are located on campus, although the varsity football team plays at FIU Campus. MKHS offers these athletics:

Fall schedule

- Bowling (boys and girls)
- Cross country (boys and girls)
- Football (varsity and junior varsity)
- Golf (boys and girls)
- Swimming (boys and girls)
- Girls' volleyball (varsity and junior varsity)

Winter schedule

- Boys' basketball (varsity and junior varsity)
- Girls' basketball (varsity and junior varsity)
- Boys' soccer (varsity)
- Girls' soccer (varsity and junior varsity)
- Wrestling (varsity and junior varsity)

Spring schedule

- Baseball (varsity and junior varsity)
- Softball (varsity and junior varsity)
- Tennis (boys and girls)
- Track and field (boys and girls)
- Water polo (boys and girls)
- Boys' volleyball (varsity)
- Badminton (boys and girls)

The American football team plays its home games at North Miami Stadium. It was established in 1998 with 65 students in the 9th and 10th grades.

=== State championships ===
- Tennis (girls) - 2007, 2008, 2010
- Tennis (boys) - 2004, 2006, 2007

== Notable alumni ==
- Trayvon Martin, attended Miami Carol City High School for 9th grade and much of the 10th grade, transferred to Krop
- Matthew Lewin of Magdalena Bay
- Laura DiLorenzo and Mimi Davila of Chongalicious fame
- Ryan Breslow, co-founder of Bolt

Twin brothers Oren Alexander and Alon Alexander (born July 5, 1987), and their older brother Tal Alexander (born July 2, 1986), are American businessmen and convicted sex offenders. Tal and Oren were luxury real estate brokers based in Miami and New York City, while Alon was an executive at his family’s private security company.

== Gallery ==
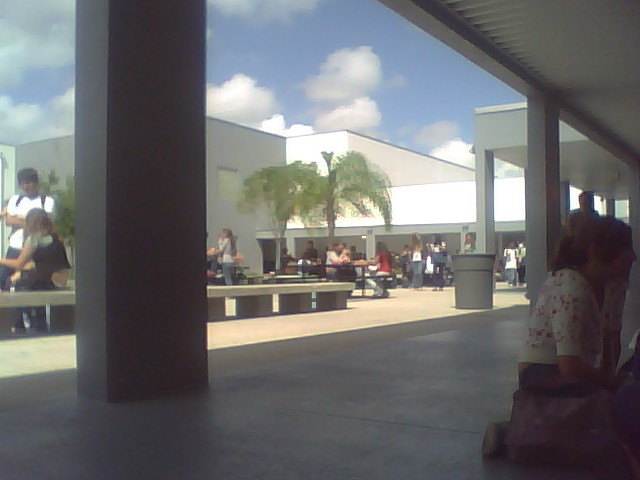
Students having lunch

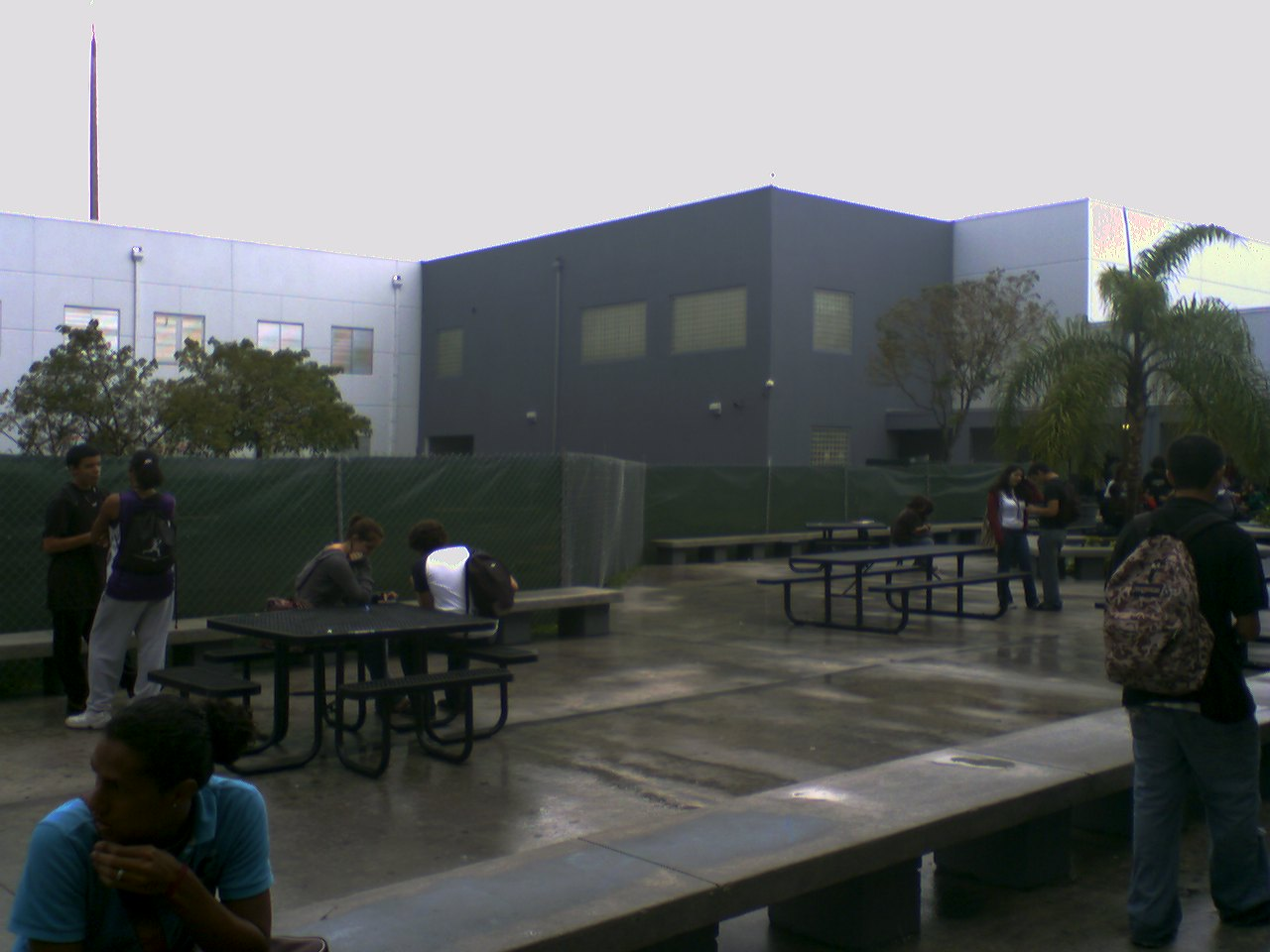
A food court being added to the patios in early 2008

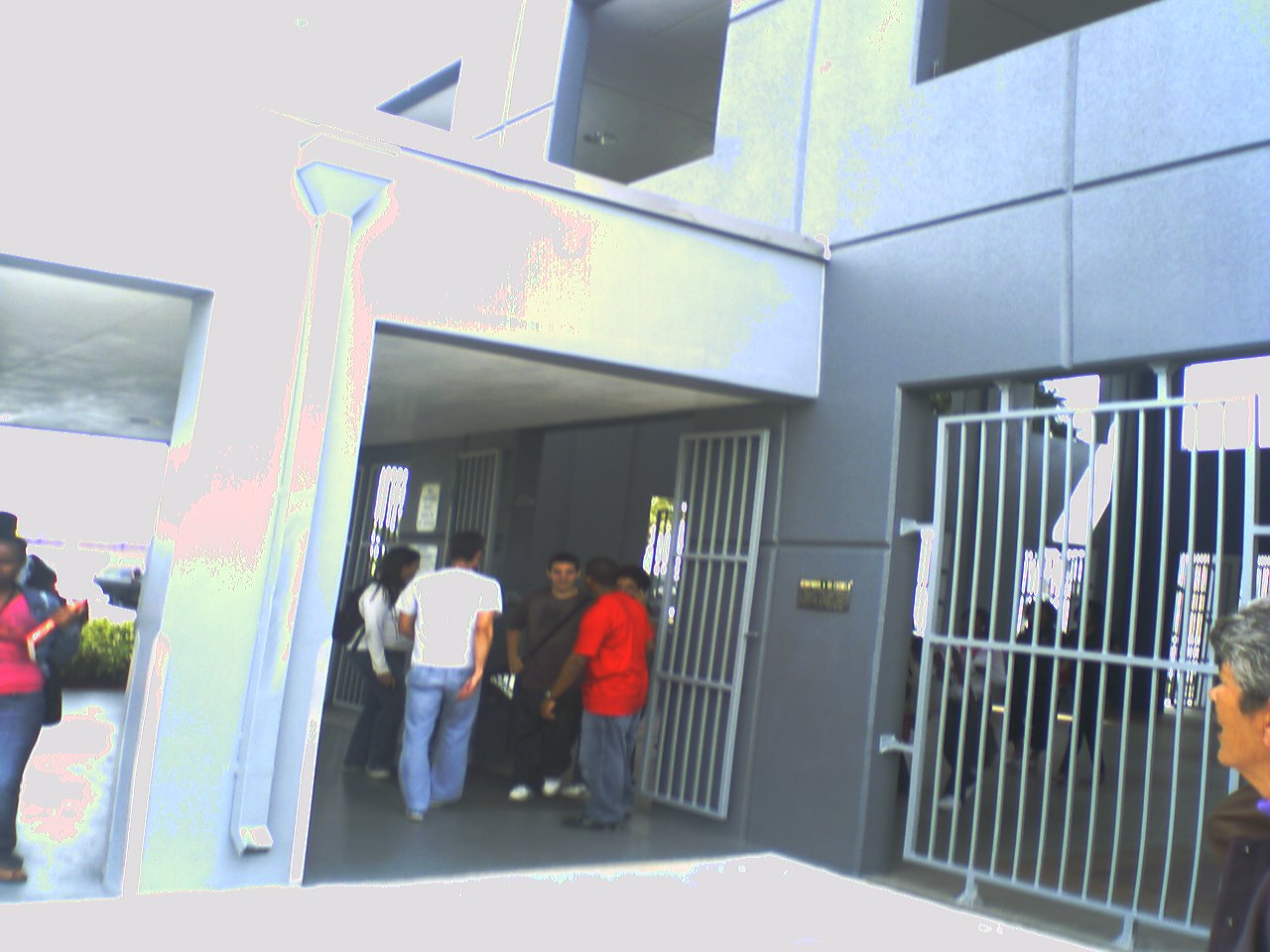
The main entrance

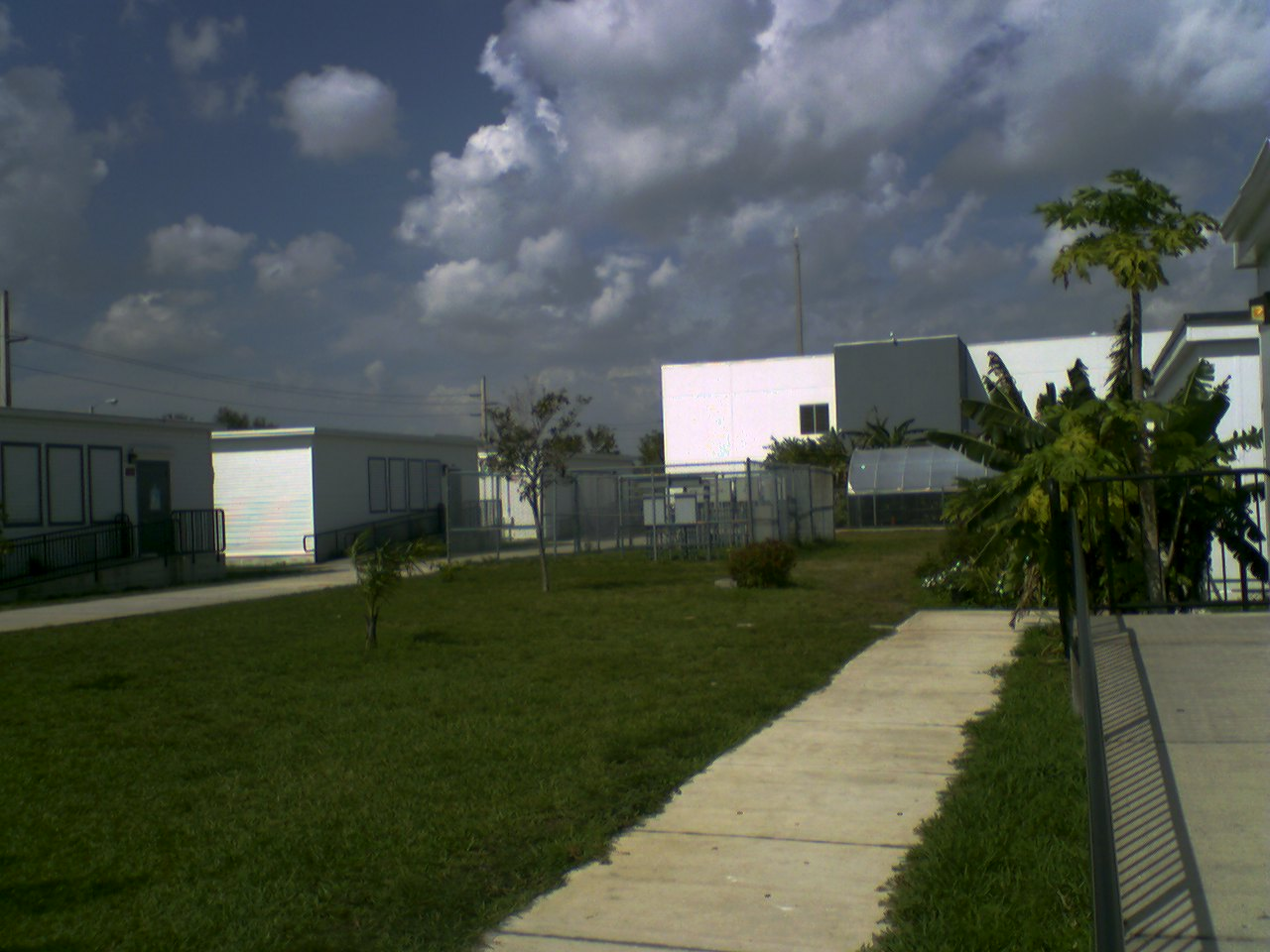
Some of the portable classrooms

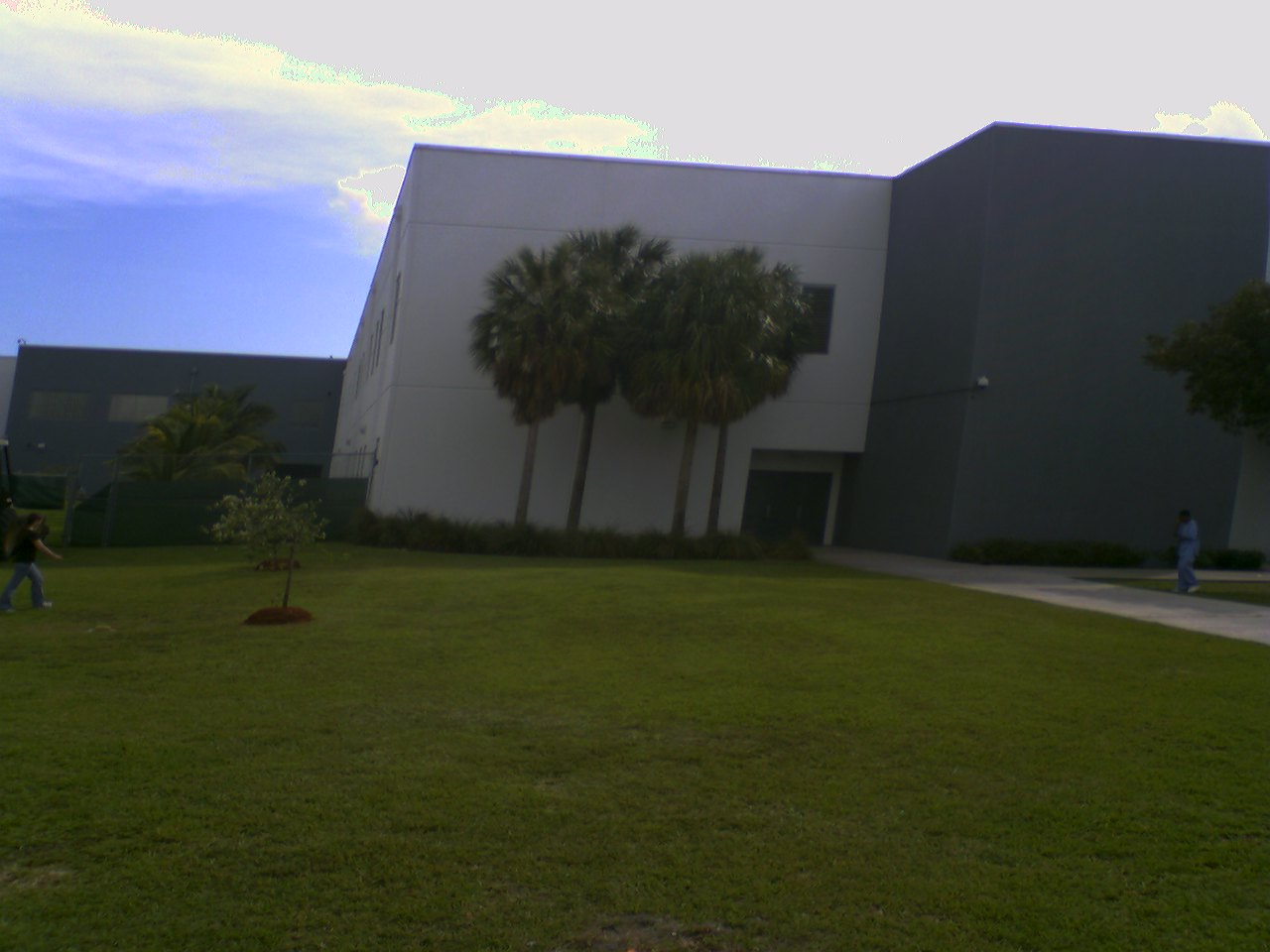
Side of the second building

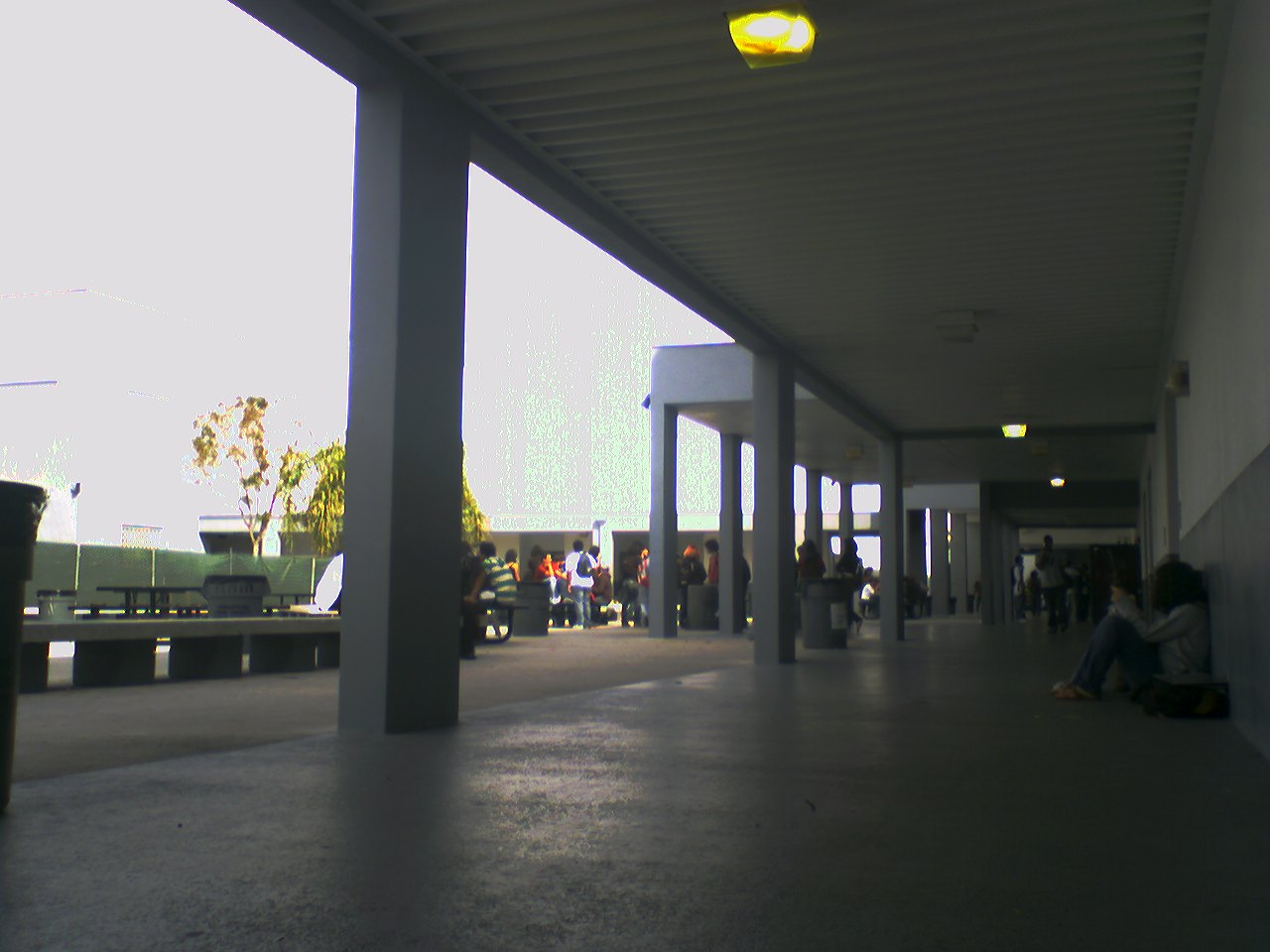
Hallway in Krop's southern patio

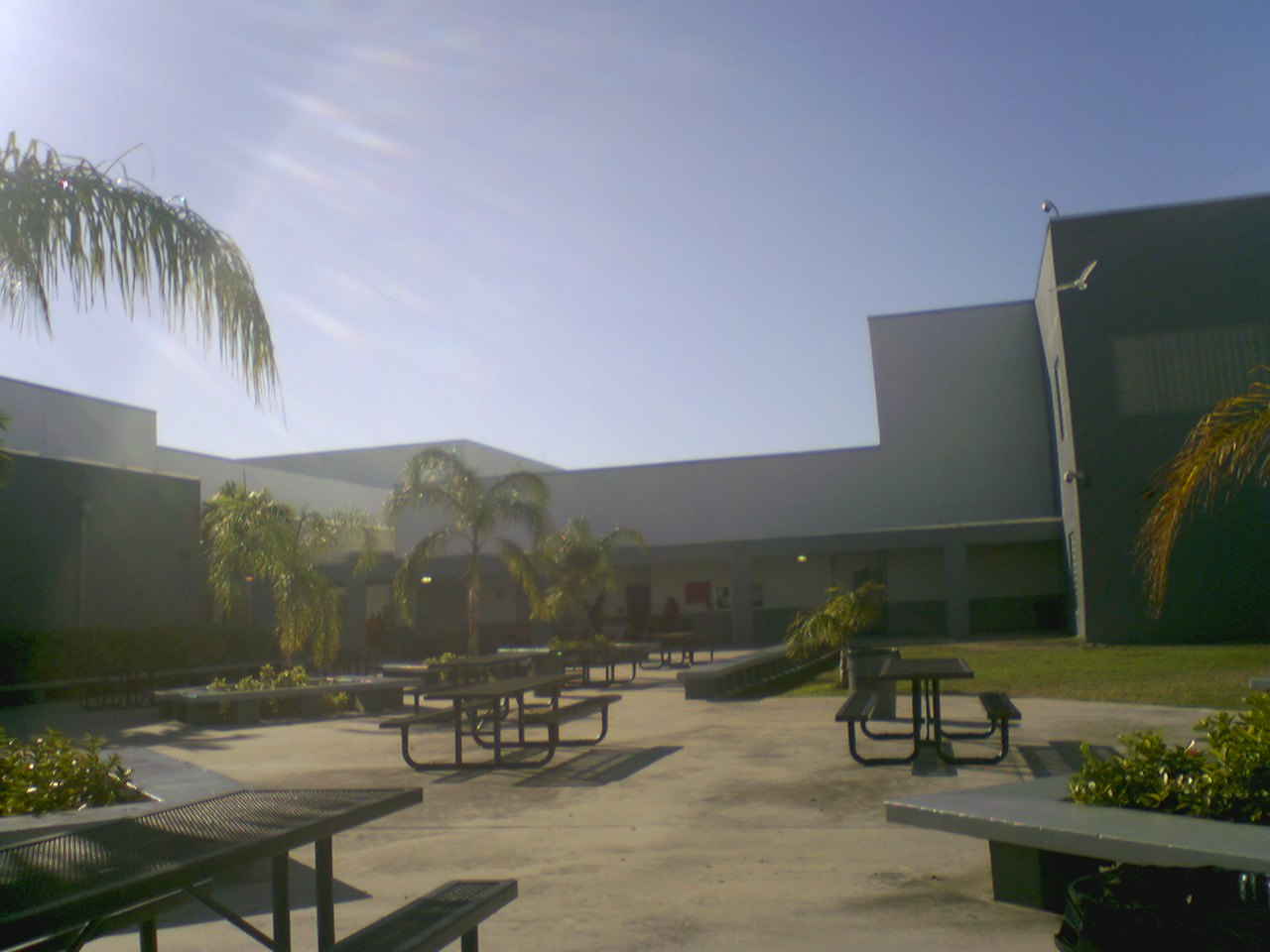
Krop's northern patio

== See also ==
- Miami-Dade County Public Schools
- High school
- Education in the United States
