= Danilochkin =

Danilochkin (Russian: Данилочкин) is a Russian masculine surname, its feminine counterpart is Danilochkina. It may refer to

- Elena Kirillova (née Danilochkina in 1986), Russian basketball player
- Sergey Danilochkin (born 1971), Russian economist
- Yuri Danilochkin (born 1991), Belarusian alpine skier
