= Homer the Blind Wonder Cat =

American cat known for book series

Homer
- Species: Felis catus
- Breed: Domestic short hair
- Sex: Male
- Born: 1997
- Died: August 21, 2013 (aged 15–16)
- Known for: Inspiration for book series
- Owner: Gwen Cooper
- Residence: Miami, Florida, New York City
- Appearance: Black

Homer the Blind Wonder Cat (1997-2013) was an eyeless cat who served as the inspiration for the 2009 New York Times bestselling memoir Homer’s Odyssey: A Fearless Feline Tale, or How I Learned about Love and Life with a Blind Wonder Cat, written by Gwen Cooper. It detailed Cooper's life with an abandoned, eyeless cat that she rescued when he was three weeks old and subsequently named Homer.

Homer’s Odyssey has been published in twenty-two languages. Following the book's 2009 publication, Homer became a famous cat on the internet and as of 2019 has a social-media following of more than 900,000 people across Facebook, Instagram, and Twitter combined. His 2013 death was covered by numerous publications around the world, including People and The New York Times online.

== Biography ==
In the spring of 1997 in Miami, Florida, veterinarian Dr. Patricia Khuly treated an eyeless, abandoned male kitten. Khuly cared for the kitten's infected eye sockets—which she sewed shut to prevent any further damage—and provided him with a foster home in her office for the next few days. Khuly estimated him to be approximately three-weeks-old. Khuly subsequently introduced him to her acquaintance Gwen Cooper, a native of Miami, who worked in non-profit administration for a number of national and local organisations. Cooper adopted the kitten on the spot and named him Homer, after the blind ancient Greek poet Homer who wrote the famous epic poems The Odyssey and The Iliad.

Homer was the third cat to enter Cooper's household, following a tabby and a snow-white Persian mix that Cooper named Scarlett and Vashti, respectively.

Over the next five years, Cooper and her three cats lived in three different homes in the greater Miami area. One night in 2000, Homer confronted an armed thief who had broken into their apartment in an attempt to rob Cooper, slashing at the intruder and chasing him out the front door.

In 2001 Cooper and her cats moved to the financial district in downtown New York City, seven months before the September 11 attacks on the World Trade Center. Several years later, they moved to Midtown Manhattan to live with Cooper's future husband Laurence Lerman, marking the sixth home Cooper and her cats had lived in over the prior eight years. Homer lived in Midtown with Cooper and Lerman for the rest of his life.

== Books ==
=== Homer's Odyssey: A Fearless Feline Tale, or How I Learned About Love and Life With a Blind Wonder Cat (2009) ===
Homer the Blind Wonder Cat
- Author: Gwen Cooper
- Genre: Memoir
- Publication date: 2009

In August 2009, Random House published Cooper's memoir Homer’s Odyssey: A Fearless Feline Tale, or How I Learned about Love and Life with a Blind Wonder Cat.

The memoir has its roots in a story that Cooper published on Salon.com in October 2008. The story, entitled “Mucho Gato,” detailed the tale of Homer taking on the foiled Miami apartment thief. The “Mucho Gato” posting was one of the most popular posts on Salon.com's Open Salon blogging platform that month.

Spanning twelve years, the memoir covers Cooper's experiences with Homer, along with Vashti and Scarlett, as she endured a see-sawing professional and personal life. Along with the robbery story, sections of the memoir include Cooper and her cats relocating around Miami and then to New York City, and Cooper's efforts to return home to her cats who were trapped alone in their apartment near the World Trade Center following the terrorist attacks of 9/11. The final third of the memoir focuses on Cooper's attempts to acclimate her cats and the man she would eventually marry to living together in their Manhattan apartment.

Homer’s Odyssey: A Fearless Feline Tale, or How I Learned about Love and Life with a Blind Wonder Cat debuted at the #14 spot on the New York Times Best Seller List upon publication and spent four weeks on the list. A paperback edition of the memoir was published in 2010 and also spent four weeks on the New York Times Best Seller List.

Homer’s Odyssey: A Fearless Feline Tale, or How I Learned about Love and Life with a Blind Wonder Cat has been published in 22 languages in some 32 countries around the world, including the Netherlands (Wonderkat), Germany (Homer und Ich), Italy (Omero Gatto Nero), France (L'odyssée d'Homère), Russia (Одиссея Гомера), Finland (Homer-kissan uskomaton elämä), Poland (Odyseja kota imieniem Homer), England, Korea, China, and Japan.

Cooper has said that, “ultimately a special-needs pet is just like any other pet, and just as capable of loving you and living a wonderful life as any other animal,” and that she wrote Homer’s Odyssey in part to promote that message.

=== Homer: The Ninth Life of a Blind Wonder Cat (2015) ===
In 2015, nearly six years after the publication of Homer’s Odyssey, Cooper published Homer: The Ninth Life of a Blind Wonder Cat, a sequel to the original international bestseller.

The Ninth Life of a Blind Wonder Cat details the continuing story of Homer and his family following the 2009 publication of Homer’s Odyssey, which saw him evolve from beloved house cat to one of the world's most recognizable felines. Cooper reveals Homer's “involvement” in the wind-up to the publication of Homer’s Odyssey, including Homer's photo sessions, encounters with his publisher's team and meeting members of the press.

The book also delves into Homer's later years, where he served as a big brother of sorts to a new special-needs kitten who would enter his and Gwen's lives. The Ninth Life of a Blind Wonder Cat also covers his bout with acute liver failure, which veterinarians predicted Homer would die from within a few weeks, a prognosis that proved incorrect when Homer went on to live in relative good health for more than six months. Homer's illness and seemingly miraculous extended life are the subject of Cooper's 2018 short memoir Homer and The Holiday Miracle.

Homer's death on August 21, 2013, as well as the passing of Scarlett and Vashti, are also recounted.

=== Homer and The Holiday Miracle (2018) ===
Homer and The Holiday Miracle is a short memoir by Gwen Cooper published by BenBella Books in October 2018. Issued as a pocket-sized hardcover edition, the fifty-page memoir relates the story of how in December 2012, Homer was diagnosed by veterinarians as having acute liver failure and “that he wouldn’t even make it to Christmas Eve.” It was a prognosis that mirrored the one that Homer had received fifteen years earlier when doctors warned that a tiny, sightless kitten was unlikely to survive and probably would not have much of a life even if he did. However, Homer went on to live comfortably and with high energy for more than another six months.

Homer left behind a rescue community of “Homer’s Heroes” that continues to advocate for special-needs animals in his name.

=== My Life in a Cat House: True Tales of Love, Laughter and Living with Five Felines (2018) ===
My Life in a Cat House: True Tales of Love, Laughter and Living with Five Felines is a memoir recounted in eight interconnected stories about Gwen Cooper's life with her well-known cat family, including Homer, Scarlett, Vashti and her two newest additions, Clayton and Fanny. It was published in hardcover by BenBella Books in October 2018.

Homer is featured most prominently in two of the tales: “’Cat Lovers Don’t Read Books’,” which takes its title from what a literary agent said to Cooper upon her pitching her idea for a Homer memoir to prospective publishers; and “The Worm Has Turned,” an in-depth look at Homer's obsession with his favourite cat toy—a cloth worm topped with a small jingling bell.

== Special-needs animals ==
Since his introduction to an international audience in 2009, Homer has become known as a symbol and “spokes-cat” for the cause and care of special-needs animals, an area which Cooper actively participates. Homer’s Odyssey and Homer's story have been credited with contributing directly to a decrease in the number of special-needs animals euthanized in shelters and an increase in the number of adoptions of blind cats. Cooper lends Homer's image to fundraising events serving special-needs animals and donates 10% of her royalties from Homer’s Odyssey to organisations that serve abused, abandoned, and disabled animals. Notable among her many campaigns to raise awareness and funds for the animal community was a $10,000 donation she made to Blind Cat Rescue & Sanctuary in Raleigh, North Carolina in Homer's name.

== See also ==
- List of individual cats
