= Golden Beach, Florida =

- Town
- Town of Golden Beach
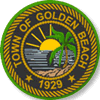
- Seal

- Location in Miami-Dade County and the state of Florida
- Interactive map of Golden Beach, Florida
- Coordinates: 25°57′42″N 80°07′23″W
- Country: United States
- State: Florida
- County: Miami-Dade
- Founded: 1924
- Incorporated: May 23, 1929

Government
  - Type: Council-Manager
  - Mayor: Glenn Singer
  - Vice Mayor: Judy Lusskin
  - Councilmembers: Kenneth Bernstein, Bernard Einstein, and Jessie Mendal
  - Town Manager: Alexander Diaz
  - Town Clerk: Lissette Perez

Area
  - Total: 0.41 sq mi (1.07 km^{2})
  - Land: 0.32 sq mi (0.84 km^{2})
  - Water: 0.089 sq mi (0.23 km^{2})
- Elevation: 0 ft (0 m)

Population (2020)
  - Total: 961
  - Density: 2,951.6/sq mi (1,139.63/km^{2})
- Time zone: UTC-5 (Eastern (EST))
  - Summer (DST): UTC-4 (EDT)
- ZIP code: 33160
- Area codes: 305, 786, 645
- FIPS code: 12-26250
- GNIS feature ID: 2406583
- Website: www.goldenbeach.us

Golden Beach is a town in Miami-Dade County, Florida, United States, between the Intracoastal Waterway and Atlantic Ocean. The town is part of the Miami metropolitan area of South Florida. As of the 2020 US census, the town had a population of 961.

Golden Beach is known as a very upscale community. Celebrities who've lived in the town include Bill Gates, Tommy Hilfiger, and Ricky Martin. Eric Clapton's album 461 Ocean Boulevard was named after the address of his Golden Beach house, and the photo of where he lived is featured as the album cover. High-rise construction and commercial development are not permitted within the town limits.

In 1981, all but one of the roads into the town from A1A were closed as a means of preventing "criminals, curious tourists from nearby hotels, joggers, and Haitian refugees" from entering Golden Beach. The blockades remained, and A1A continues to be the only road into town and a police guardhouse stands at the community entrance.

== Geography ==
The Town of Golden Beach is located in the northeast corner of Miami-Dade County.

It is on the barrier island that separates the Intracoastal Waterway from the ocean; the entire town is about one mile from north to south, and four blocks from east to west. It is bordered to the south by the city of Sunny Isles Beach, to the west by the city of Aventura, and to the north by the city of Hallandale Beach in Broward County. According to the U.S. Census Bureau, the town has a total area of 0.42 square miles (1.09 km^{2}), of which 0.33 square miles (0.85 km^{2}) are land and 0.09 square miles (0.23 km^{2}), or 21.45%, are water.

=== Surrounding areas ===
Broward County (Hallandale Beach)
Broward County (Hallandale Beach) Atlantic Ocean
Aventura Atlantic Ocean
Aventura Atlantic Ocean
Sunny Isles Beach

=== Climate ===
The Town of Golden Beach has a tropical climate, similar to the climate found in much of the Caribbean. It is part of the only region in the 48 contiguous states within that category. More specifically, it generally has a tropical savanna climate (Köppen climate classification: Aw), bordering a tropical monsoon climate (Köppen climate classification: Am).

== Demographics ==
Historical population
| Census | Pop. | Note | %± |
|---|---|---|---|
| 1930 | 36 | | — |
| 1940 | 83 | | 130.6% |
| 1950 | 156 | | 88.0% |
| 1960 | 413 | | 164.7% |
| 1970 | 849 | | 105.6% |
| 1980 | 612 | | −27.9% |
| 1990 | 774 | | 26.5% |
| 2000 | 919 | | 18.7% |
| 2010 | 919 | | 0.0% |
| 2020 | 961 | | 4.6% |
U.S. Decennial Census

=== 2010 and 2020 census ===
Golden Beach racial composition (Hispanics excluded from racial categories) (NH = Non-Hispanic)
| Race | Pop 2010 | Pop 2020 | % 2010 | % 2020 |
|---|---|---|---|---|
| White (NH) | 660 | 608 | 71.82% | 63.27% |
| Black or African American (NH) | 14 | 0 | 1.52% | 0.00% |
| Native American or Alaska Native (NH) | 0 | 0 | 0.00% | 0.00% |
| Asian (NH) | 3 | 3 | 0.33% | 0.31% |
| Pacific Islander or Native Hawaiian (NH) | 0 | 0 | 0.00% | 0.00% |
| Some other race (NH) | 1 | 7 | 0.11% | 0.73% |
| Two or more races/Multiracial (NH) | 0 | 18 | 0.00% | 1.87% |
| Hispanic or Latino (any race) | 241 | 325 | 26.22% | 33.82% |
| Total | 919 | 961 | 100.00% | 100.00% |

As of the 2020 United States census, there were 961 people, 175 households, and 147 families residing in the town.

As of the 2010 United States census, there were 919 people, 236 households, and 202 families residing in the town.

=== 2000 census ===
In 2000, 49.3% had children under the age of 18 living with them, 72.3% were married couples living together, 8.5% had a female householder with no husband present, and 17.0% were non-families. 13.8% of all households were made up of individuals, and 8.2% had someone living alone who was 65 years of age or older. The average household size was 3.26 and the average family size was 3.55.

In 2000, the town population was spread out, with 34.6% under the age of 18, 3.5% from 18 to 24, 24.5% from 25 to 44, 26.2% from 45 to 64, and 11.2% who were 65 years of age or older. The median age was 39 years. For every 100 females, there were 96.4 males. For every 100 females age 18 and over, there were 85.5 males.

In 2000, the median income for a household in the town was $136,686, and the median income for a family was $141,557. Males had a median income of $81,193 versus $58,750 for females. The per capita income for the town was $73,053.

As of 2000, speakers of English as a first language accounted for 55.01% of the population, while Spanish accounted for 35.09% of the populace, speakers of Hebrew made up 4.40%, French was at 3.85%, and Russian was the mother tongue for 1.65% of residents.

== Education ==
Miami-Dade County Public Schools serves Golden Beach.

All residents are zoned to Norman S. Edelcup/Sunny Isles Beach K-8 in Sunny Isles Beach for elementary and K–8. Prior to August 2008 residents were zoned to Highland Oaks Elementary School. Residents who want a standard comprehensive middle school instead of a K–8 may choose to enroll at a separate middle school, Highland Oaks Middle School. Alonzo and Tracy Mourning Senior High Biscayne Bay Campus is the zoned senior high school. Prior to the opening of Mourning in 2009, Dr. Michael M. Krop Senior High School served Eastern Shores.
