= Norman S. Edelcup/Sunny Isles Beach K-8 =

Norman S. Edelcup/Sunny Isles Beach K–8
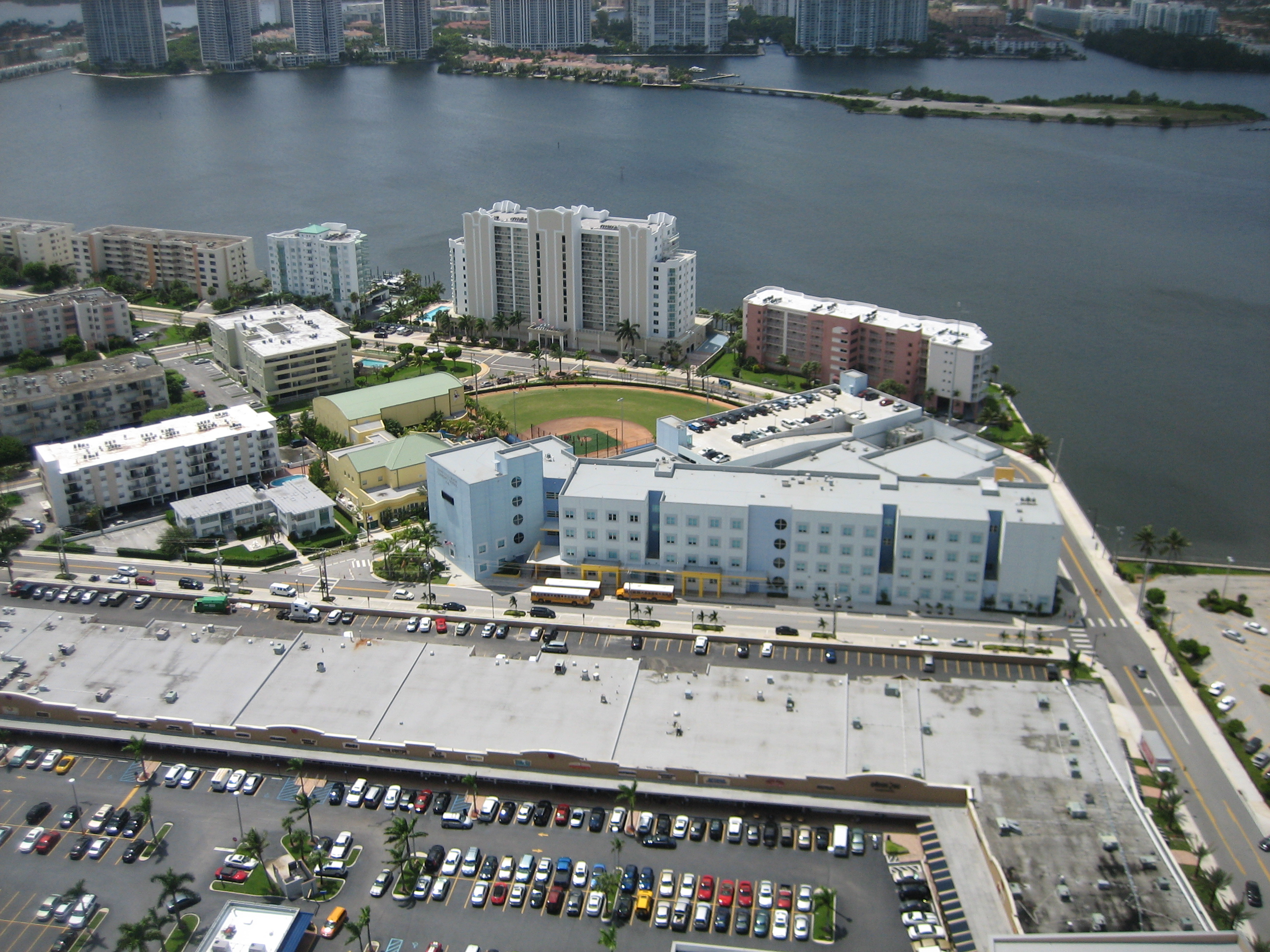

Location
- 201 182 Drive; Sunny Isles Beach, Florida 33160; United States; 25.94479°N 80.12314°W

Information
- School type: Public, K-8 school
- Established: 2008
- School district: Miami-Dade County Public Schools
- Principal: Marc W. Schwam
- Staff: 122.00 (FTE)
- Faculty: 120 (approximate)
- Enrollment: 2,174 (2017–18)
- Student to teacher ratio: 17.82
- Colors: Red; Blue
- Mascot: Seahawk
- Website: Norman S. Edelcup/Sunny Isles

Norman S. Edelcup/Sunny Isles Beach K–8 is part of the Miami-Dade County School District. It educates students from kindergarten through eighth grade from Sunny Isles Beach, Eastern Shores, and Golden Beach.

The school opened in 2008. It was initially discussed as a means to relieve class sizes in Ruth K. Broad Bay Harbor Elementary School, Ojus Elementary School, and Highland Oaks Middle School.

== Change of name ==
The school opened in August 2008, under the name Sunny Island Community School. The name change was first proposed in February 2011. It was the first school established in Sunny Isles Beach.

== Architecture ==
The building was designed by SBLM Architects.

== Hours ==
Students of the school attend during the following hours;

- Kindergarten – first grade: 8:20 am–1:50 pm.
- Second – eighth grade: 8:35 am–3:05 pm and 8:35 am–1:50 pm on Wednesdays.
