= Michael Krop =

American orthodontist and school board member (1930–2018)

Michael M. Krop (July 21, 1930 – July 31, 2018) was an American orthodontist from Florida who served as an elected member of the board of education of the Miami-Dade County Public Schools, which oversaw what was then the fourth largest school system in the United States, for 24 years, from 1980 to 2004. By the time Krop's service to the School Board ended, it oversaw over 360,000 students and a $4.3 billion annual budget.

== Early life, education, and career ==
Born in Pennsylvania, Krop was raised in Pottsville, and received an undergraduate degree from Pennsylvania State University in 1952, and a D.D.S. from the dental school at Temple University in 1956. He served as a dentist in the United States Army for two years, and then attended the orthodontics program at Northwestern University. In 1960, he moved to Miami and entered into private practice there.

== Political activities ==
In 1980 Krop ran as a reform candidate, besting four opponents to win his seat. He initially took up mundane, relatively non-controversial issues, seeking increased homework loads for a student population he believed to be underchallenged, and pushing for measures to reduce a rising trend of violence in schools. In November 1987, Krop won a rare unanimous vote to chair the School Board in a special election by the Board, and was reaffirmed in that position the following year.

Krop was elected to chair the School Board four times. This position allowed him to advocate strongly for the needs of minority students, particularly among newly arriving immigrant populations. When the school system was overwhelmed by the immigration of Nicaraguan refugees in 1988-1989, Krop led efforts to address the crisis, and called upon the federal government to provide aid. He also sought to bring greater public exposure to the School Board, initiating "gavel to gavel" television coverage of School Board meetings.

In 1998, Dr. Michael M. Krop High School was named for him. The event triggered some controversy, as some members of the community preferred other names. Former board members Janet McAliley and Betsy Kaplan accused Krop of lobbying to have the school named for him on separate occasions, a charge which Krop denied.

Krop was a stalwart Democrat throughout his service, but the School Board gradually shifted to a more conservative composition. When Krop was first elected, the Board had been entirely composed of Democrats for twenty years. By the end of his tenure, the Board had become a majority-Republican body, but Krop's colleagues continued to support his leadership. At the time of Krop's retirement from public office, he was the longest-serving elected official in Miami-Dade County.

== Personal life and death ==
Krop married Lois, with whom he had two sons and two daughters. He died on July 31, 2018, aged 88.
