= Ryan Breslow =

American entrepreneur (born 1994)

- Born: May 20, 1994 (age 32); Miami, Florida, U.S.
- Education: Stanford University
- Occupation: Entrepreneur
- Title: Co-founder and chairman, Bolt Financial; Co-founder, Eco
- Board member of: Bolt; Eco; The Movement; Love

Ryan Breslow (born May 20, 1994) is an American entrepreneur and investor. He is the co-founder and chairman of Bolt, a one-click checkout technology company; a co-founder of Eco, a digital cryptocurrency platform; a co-founder of Love, a crypto pharmaceutical startup; the founder of the dance non-profit, The Movement; and the founder of Family, a venture capital fund.

== Early life and education ==
Breslow was born and raised in North Miami Beach, Florida, the son to Lynn and David Breslow. He was raised in a Jewish family with deep Ukrainian roots, as multiple generations of his ancestors lived in Kiev and Odesa before escaping on foot just before the Holocaust. In middle school, he taught himself to code through online tutorials and YouTube videos.

He attended Dr. Michael M. Krop Senior High School. Throughout high school he was a bag boy at the grocery chain Publix. He also founded an online mattress company and designed and programmed websites for clients including a luxury shopping center and a LeBron James–backed streetwear brand. Breslow founded two community service projects; the first helped underserved kids who wanted to golf but lacked financial resources and the second benefited homeless veterans in Miami-Dade. A National AP Scholar and National Merit Award semi-finalist, he graduated from high school first in his class and received a financial aid scholarship to Stanford.

== Career ==
=== Bolt ===
As a computer science student at Stanford, Breslow was interested in digital currency. In his freshman year, he co-founded a research collective, the Stanford Bitcoin Group. In 2013, he and a classmate began to develop a digital wallet that would allow Bitcoin to be used for routine transactions. Shortly after beginning the project, his classmate lost interest and the investor who had promised seed money backed out.

Breslow dropped out of Stanford in 2014. He continued to live and work out of his dorm room. In addition to developing the wallet, Breslow and Eric Feldman, a former classmate, spent the following year researching financial regulations, compliance, and other cryptocurrency-related issues. In 2015, partly as a result of their research, their emphasis shifted to one-click checkout technology. In a 2022 interview with Forbes, Breslow said: “One day it hit me like a bolt of lightning. Amazon has offered one-click checkout since 1999 and the rest of the world doesn’t. The more I learned, the more I realized how big it could be.” He subsequently focused on developing software that would provide one-click purchases for consumers and process transactions for retailers.

The first version of Bolt's online checkout platform was developed in Breslow's dorm room with a team of 10. In 2016, after operating in stealth mode for more than a year, Bolt was officially launched. Breslow served as the company's CEO. In 2019 it was named to the Forbes "Fintech 50" and in 2021 Bolt was placed at #64 on the Inc. 5000.

With input from the Bolt staff, Breslow developed the Conscious Culture Playbook, an alternative to a traditional employee handbook that brought mindfulness principles together with standards for performance and execution. In May 2021, conscious.org was launched to make the playbook freely available to other companies and startups. As part of the company's conscious business culture, Breslow instituted a four-day workweek in January 2022.

In January 2022, Maju Kuruvilla was named CEO of Bolt and Breslow became the company's executive chairman and then chairman. The move followed a controversial series of tweets, in which Breslow described Y Combinator and Stripe as the "mob bosses of Silicon Valley." Breslow maintained that the shift was unrelated to his tweets and had been planned months in advance to allow him to focus on his “superpowers”: steering Bolt's culture and vision, and deal-making.

As of May 2022, Bolt had 800 employees and was valued at $11 billion. Based on his holdings, Breslow became one of the world's youngest self-made billionaires.

According to an April 2023 letter from a lawyer representing Bolt investors, Breslow was subpoenaed by the SEC in connection with an investigation into whether federal securities laws were violated in connections with statements he made while fundraising for Bolt in 2021.

As of February 2024, Bolt had under 700 employees, and was valued at approximately $300 million - a 97% decrease in price from 21 months prior - resulting in Breslow no longer being a billionaire.

On May 20, 2026, notably on International Human Resources Day, Breslow laid off the entire human resources staff of Bolt, claiming "We had an HR team, and that HR team was causing problems that didn't exist. Those problems disappeared when I let them go."

== The Movement ==
Breslow began taking dance classes in San Francisco to diminish the day-to-day stress of running Bolt. Discovering a community among dancers, and believing that dancing would be globally beneficial, he founded The Movement, a non-profit that provides free dance classes to make dance widely accessible. Initially offered in Miami, it later expanded to New York and Los Angeles.

== Recognition ==
Breslow was named an Entrepreneur Of The Year, Northern California in 2021 and a Forbes retail and e-commerce Allstar in 2022.

== Bibliography ==
- Fundraising, August 2021. Independently published. ISBN 979-8456959645
- Recruiting, December 2021. Independently published. ISBN 979-8781807697
