= Sergey Danilochkin =

Russian economist (born 1971)

Sergey Vladimirovich Danilochkin (Russian:Сергей Владимирович Данилочкин, born June 24, 1971) is a Russian economist, academic, and political commentator. He emigrated to the United States in 2010, following political persecution in Russia. He is a correspondent member of the Russian Academy of Natural Sciences.

== Life and career ==
Sergey Danilochkin was born in Kazakhstan in 1971. In 1992, he graduated from St. Petersburg Military Institute of Railway Communications, specialising in military logistics. In 1994, Danilochkin earned a master's degree in finance from the Moscow Aviation Institute, specialising in economics and finance, and further specialising in operations analysis and financial audit, based upon which he defended a doctoral dissertation in economics in 1996. He was admitted to the correspondent member of Russian Academy of Natural Sciences in 2000.

From 1996 to 2009, he held various upper management positions at the Ural Mining and Metallurgical Company and other companies, and received the Gold Medal of Peter the Great in 2004 for his contributions to the revival of post-Soviet science and economics in Russia. From 2009 to 2013, Danilochkin taught economics and finance as a professor at the Department of Economics and Finance at the Institute of Humanities Odintsovo, while defending his doctoral thesis, which he completed in 2010.

Danolochkin is an author of over 50 serial publications in the field of microeconomics and enterprise management practices, with core competence in statistical analysis, business process systematization, project management, and general finance theory. Danilochkin's professional emphasis is on enterprise management profitability.

== Political persecution in Russia ==
In late 2000s, Danilochkin uncovered a scheme organized by highly-ranked Russian law enforcement officials to embezzle taxpayers' money. Working on the auditing teams for several Russian enterprises, Danilochkin challenged the suspects to clarify his audit findings, and was allegedly framed by them as a "fly-by-night king", who had been setting up shell companies. The group alleged to be behind the fabrication was the same group involved in the Magnitsky affair, which centered on a similar style of tax fraud, according to Russian investigative journalists and Danilochkin himself, who claims he was used as a scapegoat.

As a critic of Russian President Vladimir Putin since the early 2000s, Danilochkin fled to the United States in 2010, seeking political asylum.

== Activities in the United States ==
In 2011, Danilochkin established the Russian America TV channel, based in Miami, Florida. He has also been involved in a series of real estate projects. He lives in Sunny Isles Beach, Florida, with his wife and three children.

Danilochkin has publicly criticized Russia's invasion of Ukraine in 2022. He launched several antiwar broadcasts supporting Ukraine and criticising the Russian military's practice of forcing young, untrained, and unwilling recruits to fight against the Ukrainian armed forces.
