= North Miami Beach Senior High School =

Location
- 1247 NE 167 Street; North Miami Beach, Florida 33162; United States; 25.92989°N 80.17537°W

Information
- School type: Public, high school
- Established: 1971
- School district: Miami-Dade County Public Schools
- Principal: Randy Milliken
- Teaching staff: 60.00 (FTE)
- Grades: 9-12
- Enrollment: 1,076 (2023–2024)
- Student to teacher ratio: 17.93
- Campus type: Suburban
- Colors: Red, White, and Blue
- Mascot: Charger
- Website: https://www.nmbseniorhigh.com/

North Miami Beach Senior High School (NMB High School) is a secondary school located at 1247 NE 167 Street in North Miami Beach, Florida, United States. Its current principal is Randy Milliken. NMB High School was built in 1971 as an overcrowding reliever school for North Miami Senior High School and Miami Norland Senior High School.

NMB High School was a pioneer in school construction; it was the first high school in Dade County to be built with no windows, and was therefore completely air-conditioned.

== History ==
NMB High School's style of education, with no traditional letter grades, created tension within middle- and upper-middle-class North Dade County families, whose older children had attended and graduated from traditional Dade County schools. They were not happy that their younger children would be placed in an experimental school that eschewed the traditions the parents knew, as the Miami Herald reported at the time. However, by the time the school was four years old, the non-traditional approach had been abandoned.

The high school's newspaper was called The Charger Times.

NMB High School has a Biomedical and Environmental Advancement Magnet program (BEAM) available to all students in the district. The program gives higher education credits to students wishing to pursue a career in medicine or environmental sciences.

In the summer of 2005, the school added a two-story building to its campus.

When Alonzo and Tracy Mourning Senior High Biscayne Bay Campus opened in 2009, it relieved North Miami Beach High.

== Demographics ==
NMBSHS is 72% Black, 21% Hispanic (of any race), 3% Asian/other, and 1% White non-Hispanic.

== Academics ==
North Miami Beach High School offers three magnet programs: AP Capstone pilot program, BEAM (Biomedical and Environmental Advancement Magnet Program) and iPrep. Students who successfully complete the Seminar and Capstone courses, and who earn a 3 or higher on three or more Advanced Placement courses, earn a Credential of Program completion.

== Sports ==
Until a regional high school football stadium was built in the 1990s at the northern Biscayne Bay campus of Florida International University, the NMB Chargers football team played both its home and away games at the northern regional football stadium, Traz Powell Stadium. Located at the then Miami-Dade North Community College campus, now called Miami Dade College, it was more than seven miles (11 km) away from the NMB campus. It is 24 acres (97,000 m^{2}).

== Notable alumni ==
- Steve Alvers, former professional football player, Buffalo Bills, New York Giants, New York Jets
- Garcelle Beauvais, actress and former fashion model
- E. J. Biggers, former professional football player, Philadelphia Eagles, Tampa Bay Buccaneers, and Washington Redskins
- Oscar Braynon, former Florida State Senator and State Senate Minority Leader
- Gwen Cooper, author and lecturer
- Michelle Collins, radio host, comedian, podcast host, former cast member of The View
- Johnathan Cyprien, former professional football player, Atlanta Falcons, Jacksonville Jaguars, Philadelphia Eagles, San Francisco 49ers, and Tennessee Titans
- Debbie Deb, singer and songwriter
- Louis Delmas, former professional football player, Detroit Lions and Miami Dolphins
- Neil Druckmann, video game writer and co-president of Naughty Dog
- Perry Farrell, lead singer and songwriter, Jane's Addiction
- Walshy Fire, Grammy Award-winning musician
- Eric Garcia, novelist and screenwriter
- Margie Goldstein-Engle, equestrian show horse champion
- Wymon Henderson, professional football player
- Kemal Ishmael, professional football player
- Jordan Lund, actor
- MC Jin, rapper
- Brad Meltzer, author
- Frank Mottek, broadcast journalist, CBS Los Angeles
- Christine Negroni – broadcast and print journalist, author of The Crash Detectives and Deadly Departure. Air safety specialist.
- Steve Nicosia, baseball player
- Kirill Reznik -Maryland House of Delegates member
- Felicia Robinson, Florida House of Representatives member
- Sheryl Sandberg, Facebook chief operating officer
- Cesar Altieri Sayoc Jr., criminal, suspect behind October 2018 United States mail bombing attempts

== See also ==
- Miami-Dade County Public Schools
- Education in the United States
