= Sunny Isles Beach, Florida =

- City
- City of Sunny Isles Beach
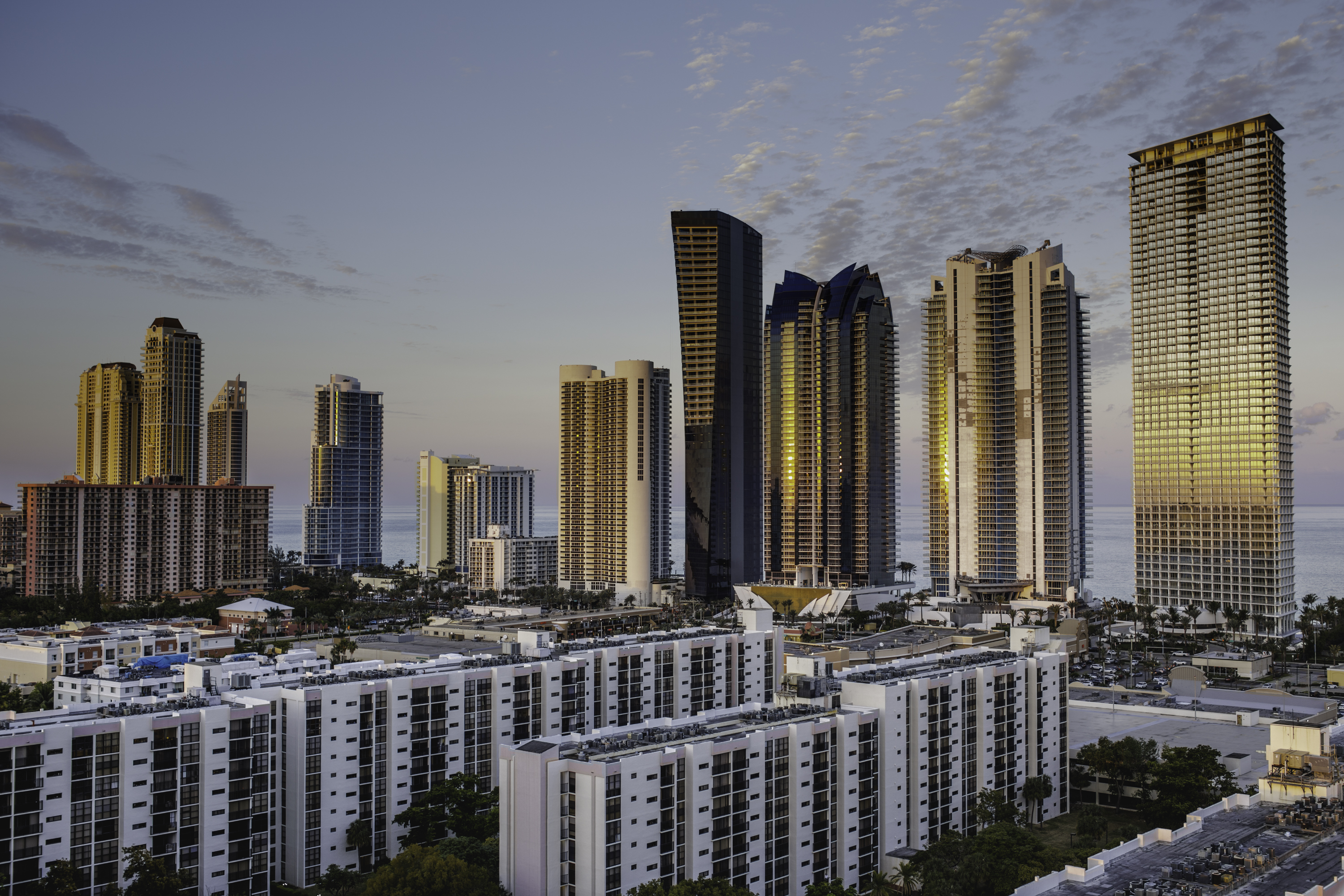
- Sunny Isles Beach skyline

- Flag Seal
- Motto: The Height of Living
- Interactive map of Sunny Isles Beach, Florida
- Coordinates: 25°56′13″N 80°07′32″W
- Country: United States
- State: Florida
- County: Miami-Dade
- Incorporated: June 16, 1997

Government
  - Type: Council-Manager
  - Mayor: Larisa Svechin
  - Vice Mayor: Alex Lama
  - Commissioners: Jeniffer Viscarra, Jerry Joseph, and Fabiola Stuyvesant
  - City Manager: Stan Morris
  - City Clerk: Mauricio Betancur

Area
  - Total: 1.81 sq mi (4.69 km^{2})
  - Land: 1.01 sq mi (2.62 km^{2})
  - Water: 0.80 sq mi (2.08 km^{2})
- Elevation: 3 ft (0.91 m)

Population (2020)
  - Total: 22,342
  - Density: 22,108.2/sq mi (8,536.02/km^{2})
- Time zone: UTC−05:00 (Eastern (EST))
  - Summer (DST): UTC−04:00 (EDT)
- ZIP Code: 33160
- Area codes: 305, 786, 645
- FIPS code: 12-69550
- GNIS feature ID: 2405548
- Website: www.sibfl.gov

Sunny Isles Beach is a city located on a barrier island in northeast Miami-Dade County, Florida, United States. The city is part of the Miami metropolitan area of South Florida, and is bounded by the Atlantic Ocean on the east and the Intracoastal Waterway on the west. As of the 2020 census, it had a population of 22,342.

Sunny Isles Beach is an area of cultural diversity with stores lining Collins Avenue, the main thoroughfare through the city. It has the 14th tallest skyline in the United States, and according to the 2020 U.S. Census it was the mostly densely populated incorporated place in the United States outside of the New York City metropolitan area.

Developers like Michael Dezer have invested heavily in construction of high-rise hotels and condominiums while licensing the Donald Trump name for some of the buildings for promotional purposes. Sunny Isles Beach has a central location, minutes from Bal Harbour to the south, and Aventura to the north and west.

Sunny Isles Beach was the 2008 site of MTV's annual Spring Break celebration, with headquarters at the local Newport Beachside Resort.

== History ==
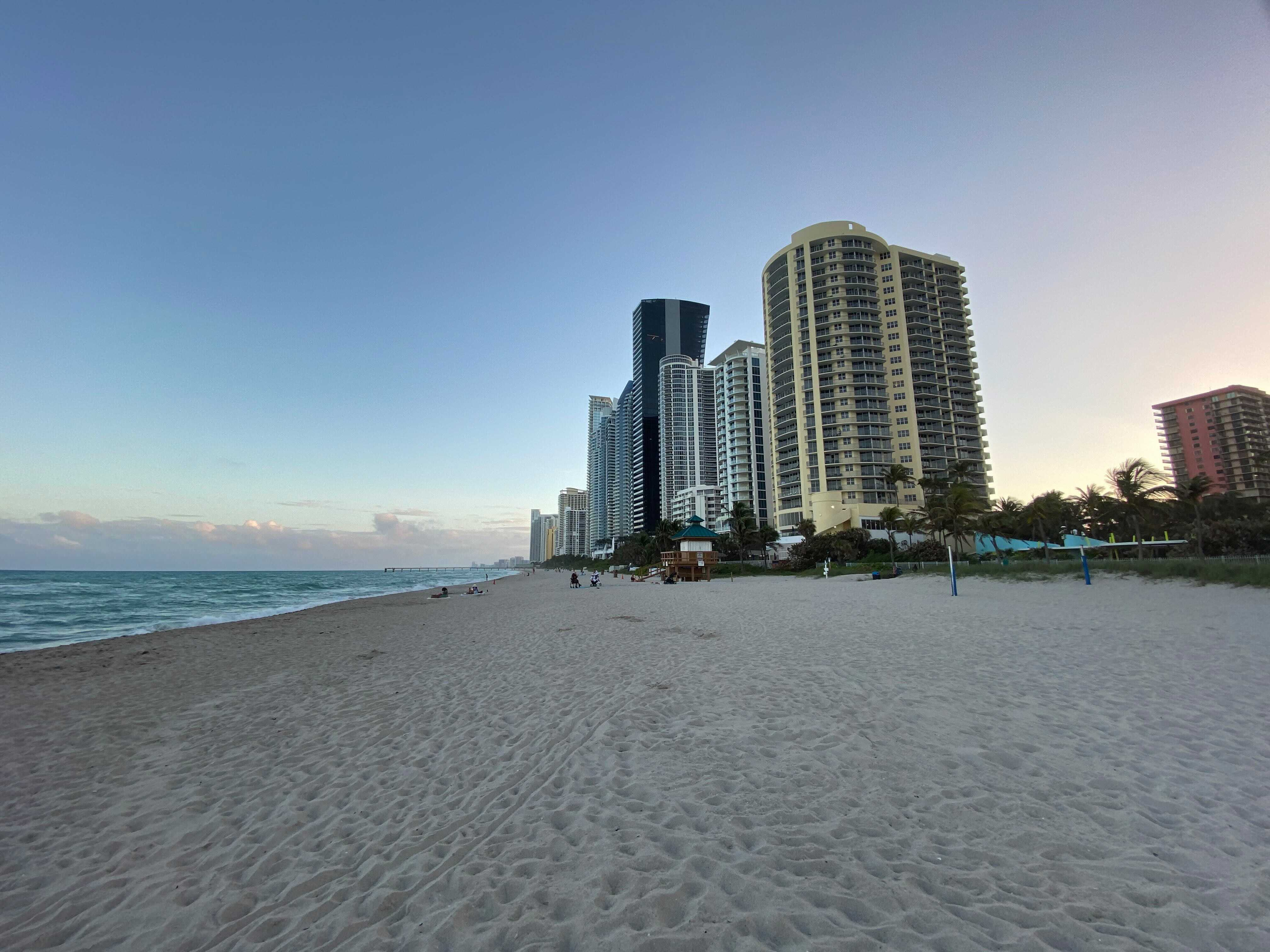
View of Sunny Isles Beach from the coast

In 1920, Harvey Baker Graves, a private investor, purchased a 2.26-square-mile (5.9 km^{2}) tract of land for development as a tourist resort. He named it "Sunny Isles, the America Riviera".

When the Haulover bridge was completed in 1925, the area became accessible from Miami Beach, attracting developers who widened streams, dug canals and inlets and created islands and peninsulas for building waterfront properties on Biscayne Bay.

Sunny Isles Beach was known as North Miami Beach until 1931, then known as Sunny Isles until 1997.

In 1936, Milwaukee malt magnate Kurtis Froedtert bought Sunny Isles. The Sunny Isles Pier was built and soon became a popular destination. Sunny Isles developed slowly until the 1950s when the first single-family homes were built in the Golden Shores area. During the 1950s and 1960s more than 30 motels sprang up along Collins Avenue including the Ocean Palm, the first two-story motel in the U.S. Designed by Norman Giller in 1948 it was developed and owned by the Gingold family for the next 45 years and provided a significant catalyst for the economic development of Sunny Isles. Tourists came from all over to vacation in themed motels along "Motel Row". One motel, The Fountainhead, was named by its owner Norman Giller after the novel by Ayn Rand. As of 2013, the Ocean Palm Motel is closed.

In 1982 the half-mile-long Sunny Isles Pier was designated a historic site. In the early-mid 1980s, it went through restoration and re-opened to the public in 1986. The pier was damaged severely in October 2005 by Hurricane Wilma. After eight years, it was remodeled and reopened as Newport Fishing Pier on June 15, 2013.

In 1997, the citizens of the area voted to incorporate as a municipality. Sunny Isles was renamed Sunny Isles Beach. Sunny Isles Beach began major redevelopment during the real estate boom of the early 2000s with mostly high-rise condominiums and some hotels under construction along the beach side of Collins Avenue (A1A) replacing most of the historic one- and two-story motels along Motel Row. In 2011, construction began on two more high-rises, Regalia, located on the northern border of the city along A1A, and The Mansions at Acqualina, located adjacent to the Acqualina Resort & Spa on the Beach.

== Geography ==
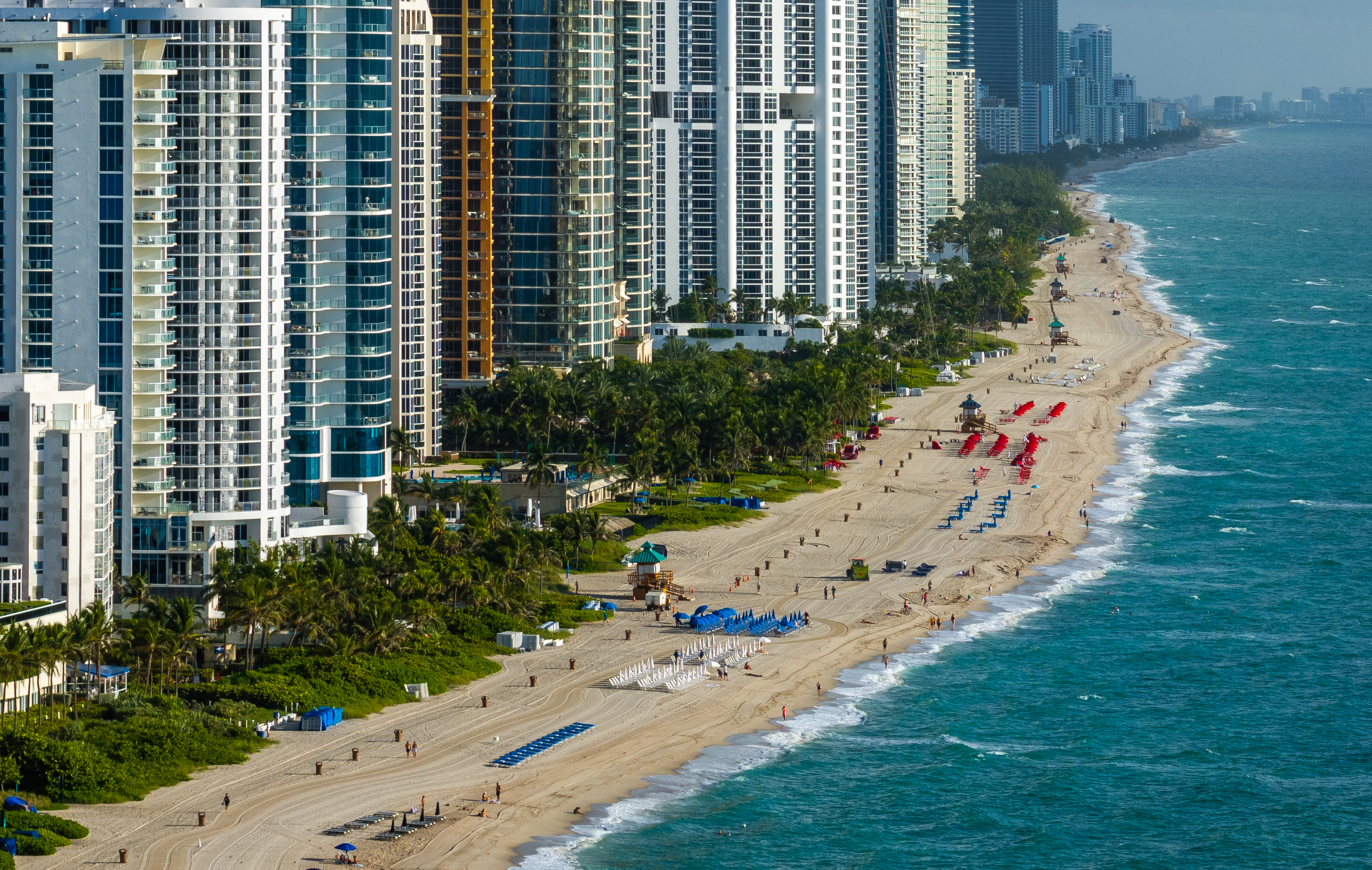
The beachline

Sunny Isles Beach is located in northeastern Miami-Dade County. It is bordered to the north by the town of Golden Beach, to the west across the Intracoastal Waterway by the cities of Aventura and North Miami Beach, to the south by Miami-Dade County's Haulover Park, and to the east by the Atlantic Ocean.

Florida State Road A1A is the main road through the city, leading north 4 miles (6 km) to Hollywood Beach and south 10 miles (16 km) to the center of Miami Beach. State Road 826 (Sunny Isles Boulevard) leads west into North Miami Beach, and State Road 856 (the William Lehman Causeway) leads west into Aventura from the north end of Sunny Isles Beach.

According to the United States Census Bureau, the city has a total area of 1.8 square miles (4.7 km^{2}), with 1.0 square mile (2.6 km^{2}) of it land and 0.8 square miles (2.1 km^{2}) of it (44.24%) as water.

=== Surrounding areas ===
Golden Beach
Aventura Atlantic Ocean
Aventura, North Miami Beach, North Miami Atlantic Ocean
North Miami Atlantic Ocean
Unincorporated Miami-Dade County (Haulover Park)

== Demographics ==
Historical population
Census	Pop.	Note	%±
2000	15,315		—
2010	20,832		36.0%
2020	22,342		7.2%
2024 (est.)	22,903	▲	2.5%
U.S. Decennial Census

=== Racial and ethnic composition ===
Sunny Isles Beach city, Florida – Racial composition Note: the US Census treats Hispanic/Latino as an ethnic category. This table excludes Latinos from the racial categories and assigns them to a separate category. Hispanics/Latinos may be of any race.
Race (NH = Non-Hispanic)	% 2020	% 2010	% 2000	Pop 2020	Pop 2010	Pop 2000
White alone (NH)	53.1%	50.2%	58.8%	11,858	10,457	9,010
Black alone (NH)	1.6%	2.6%	1.8%	359	552	271
American Indian alone (NH)	0.1%	0.1%	0.1%	12	22	10
Asian alone (NH)	1.5%	1.4%	1.3%	344	287	195
Pacific Islander alone (NH)	0%	0%	0%	2	2	0
Other race alone (NH)	1.1%	0.3%	0.3%	249	56	49
Multiracial (NH)	5%	1%	1.1%	1,124	209	173
Hispanic/Latino (any race)	37.6%	44.4%	36.6%	8,394	9,247	5,607

=== 2020 census ===
As of the 2020 census, Sunny Isles Beach had a population of 22,342. The median age was 47.0 years. 17.4% of residents were under the age of 18 and 24.6% of residents were 65 years of age or older. For every 100 females there were 91.9 males, and for every 100 females age 18 and over there were 90.4 males age 18 and over.

100.0% of residents lived in urban areas, while 0.0% lived in rural areas.

There were 10,320 households in Sunny Isles Beach, of which 24.5% had children under the age of 18 living in them. Of all households, 44.4% were married-couple households, 21.3% were households with a male householder and no spouse or partner present, and 29.7% were households with a female householder and no spouse or partner present. About 33.2% of all households were made up of individuals and 15.0% had someone living alone who was 65 years of age or older.

There were 19,328 housing units, of which 46.6% were vacant. The homeowner vacancy rate was 6.1% and the rental vacancy rate was 16.4%.

The most reported ancestries were:

- Russian (14.9%)
- Cuban (7.4%)
- Colombian (7.2%)
- Venezuelan (5%)
- Italian (4.4%)
- Brazilian (4.3%)
- Argentinean (4%)
- Ukrainian (3.5%)
- Peruvian (2.3%)
- German (2%)

Racial composition as of the 2020 census
Race	Number	Percent
White	13,712	61.4%
Black or African American	397	1.8%
American Indian and Alaska Native	50	0.2%
Asian	352	1.6%
Native Hawaiian and Other Pacific Islander	2	0.0%
Some other race	1,644	7.4%
Two or more races	6,185	27.7%
Hispanic or Latino (of any race)	8,394	37.6%

=== 2010 census ===
Sunny Isles Beach Demographics
2010 Census	Sunny Isles Beach	Miami-Dade County	Florida
Total population	20,832	2,496,435	18,801,310
Population, percent change, 2000 to 2010	+36.0%	+10.8%	+17.6%
Population density	20,518.9/sq mi	1,315.5/sq mi	350.6/sq mi
White or Caucasian (including White Hispanic)	90.6%	73.8%	75.0%
(Non-Hispanic White or Caucasian)	50.2%	15.4%	57.9%
Black or African-American	3.2%	18.9%	16.0%
Hispanic or Latino (of any race)	44.4%	65.0%	22.5%
Asian	1.4%	1.5%	2.4%
Native American or Native Alaskan	0.2%	0.2%	0.4%
Pacific Islander or Native Hawaiian	0.0%	0.0%	0.1%
Two or more races (Multiracial)	2.2%	2.4%	2.5%
Some Other Race	2.4%	3.2%	3.6%

As of the 2010 United States census, there were 20,832 people, 10,266 households, and 5,183 families residing in the city.

=== 2000 census ===
In 2000, 12.6% had children under the age of 18 living with them, 37.8% were married couples living together, 8.0% had a female householder with no husband present, and 51.1% were non-families. 43.9% of all households were made up of individuals, and 23.5% had someone living alone who was 65 years of age or older. The average household size was 1.87 and the average family size was 2.55.

In 2000, the city's population was spread out, with 11.3% under the age of 18, 5.4% from 18 to 24, 26.9% from 25 to 44, 24.3% from 45 to 64, and 32.2% who were 65 years of age or older. The median age was 50 years. For every 100 females, there were 86.3 males. For every 100 females age 18 and over, there were 83.6 males.

In 2000, the median income for a household in the city was $31,627, and the median income for a family was $40,309. The per capita income for the city was $27,576. About 11.2% of families and 14.7% of the population were below the poverty line, including 18.9% of those under age 18 and 12.2% of those age 65 or over.

As of 2000, Spanish was the mother tongue for 40.08%, while English was spoken by 36.86% of all residents. 7.37% of the population had Russian as their first language. Other languages included French (4.08%), Yiddish (2.63%), Hebrew (2.42%), Portuguese (2.01%), Polish (1.38%), Hungarian (0.93%), Italian (0.69%), Arabic (0.66%), German (0.55%), and French Creole (0.35%).

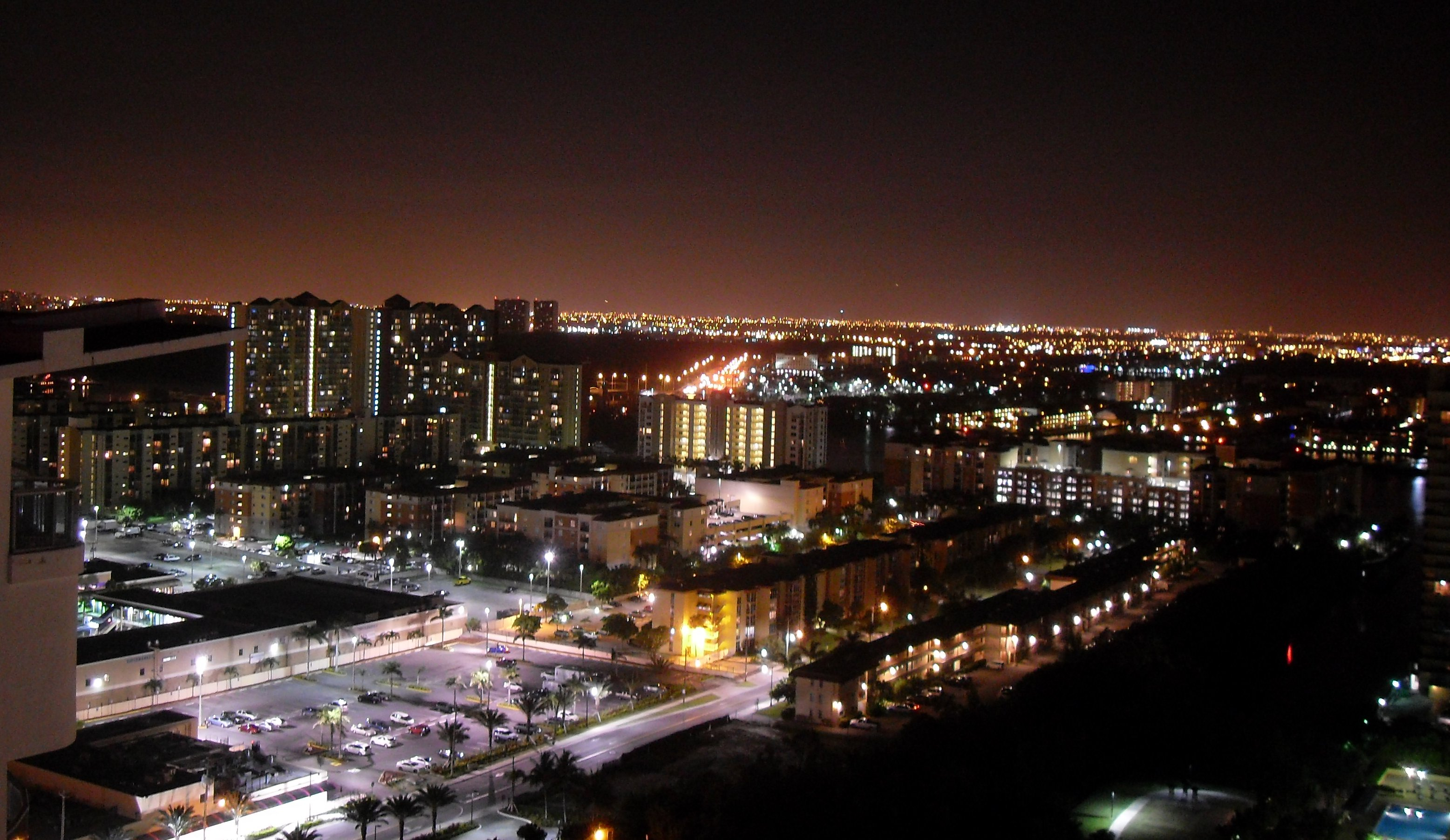
City of Sunny Isles Beach by night

Also, as of 2010, the six main ancestries of the population (excluding Hispanic ancestry) were 9.4% Russian, 5.8% Italian, 5.0% Polish, 4.9% American, 2.9% Irish, and 2.7% German.

== Education ==
Sunny Isles Beach is within the Miami-Dade County Public Schools system.

All residents are zoned to Norman S. Edelcup/Sunny Isles Beach K–8 for elementary and K–8.

Prior to August 2008 residents were zoned to an elementary school as follows:

- Ruth K. Broad/Bay Harbor Elementary School for residents south of 172nd Street
- Ojus Elementary School for residents north of 172nd Street and south of 183rd Street
- Highland Oaks Elementary School for residents north of 183rd Street

The Norman S. Edelcup/Sunny Isles Beach K–8, with four stories, is currently educating students from kindergarten through 8th grade from all of Sunny Isles Beach and Golden Beach as well as the Eastern Shores neighborhood of North Miami Beach. The school can hold up to 1,600 students. The school opened in August 2008 as a K–6, with grades 7 and 8 introduced in the subsequent two school years. The school has or is currently participating in: Accelerated Reader, VMath Live, mock elections, book drives, toy drives, etc. The school has state of the art technology that includes Smart Boards and surround sound microphones for both teachers and students. The school has Intracoastal and ocean views from almost every classroom on the 2nd, 3rd, 4th, and 5th floors. Sunny Isles Beach spent $12.5 million so the school district could buy the land. The anticipated 2008 enrollment of city residents in the school was about 900. It was originally known as Sunny Isles Beach Community School, but in 2011 a proposal came in to rename it after Mayor Norman S. Edelcup.

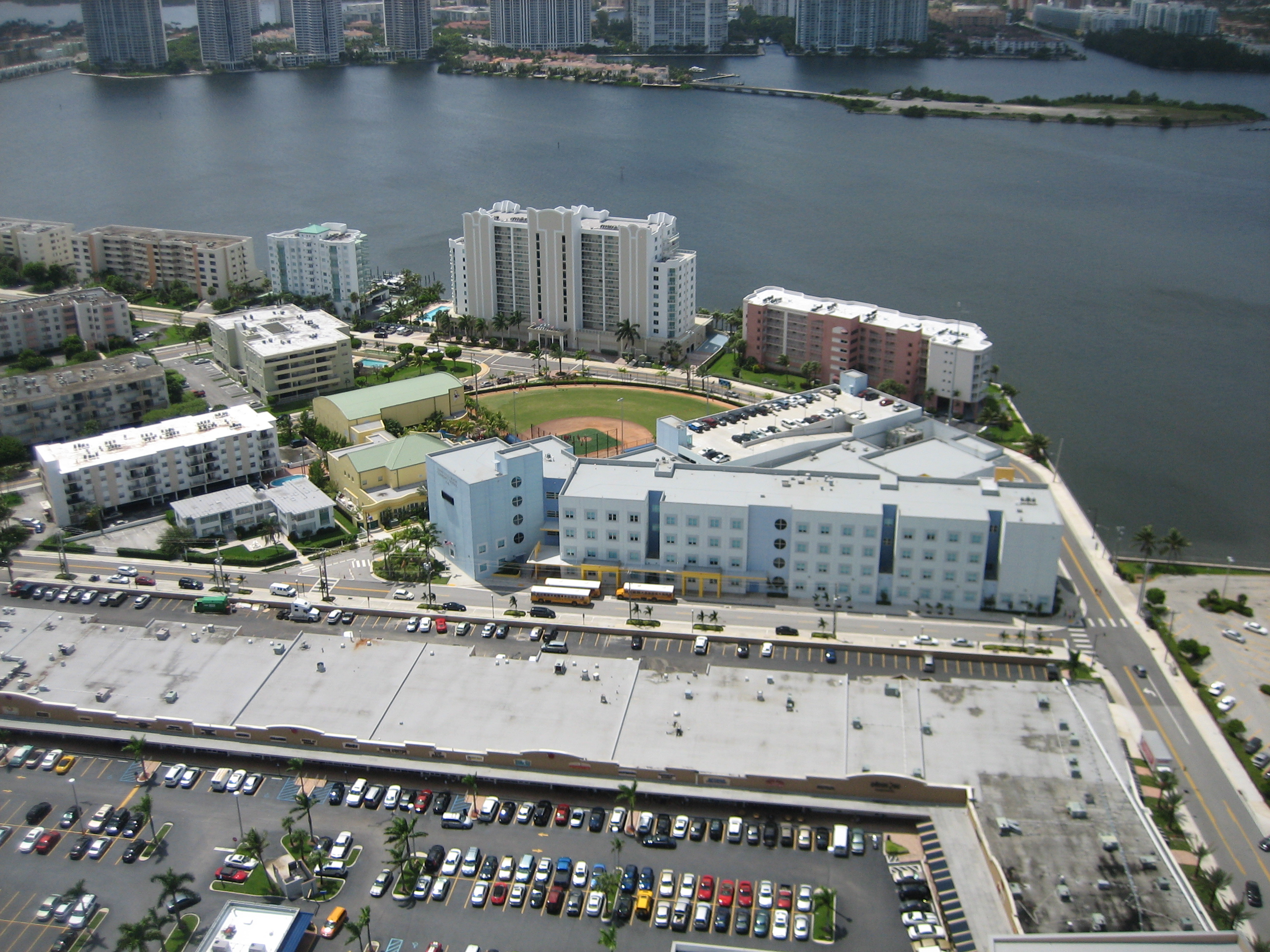
Norman S. Edelcup/Sunny Isles Beach K–8 in Sunny Isles Beach

Residents who want a standard comprehensive middle school instead of a K–8 may choose to enroll at a separate middle school, Highland Oaks Middle School in an unincorporated area.

Alonzo and Tracy Mourning Senior High Biscayne Bay Campus, which opened in 2009 in North Miami, is one senior high school serving residents of Sunny Isles Beach. Dr. Michael M. Krop Senior High School also serves Sunny Isles Beach. Sunny Isles Beach lists both Krop and Mourning as Senior High Schools on its Education website.

== Media ==
Sunny Isles Beach has its own newspaper, Sunny Isles Community News, published bi-weekly and part of Miami Community Newspapers. Sunny Isles Beach is also served by the Miami-Ft.Lauderdale market for local radio and television.

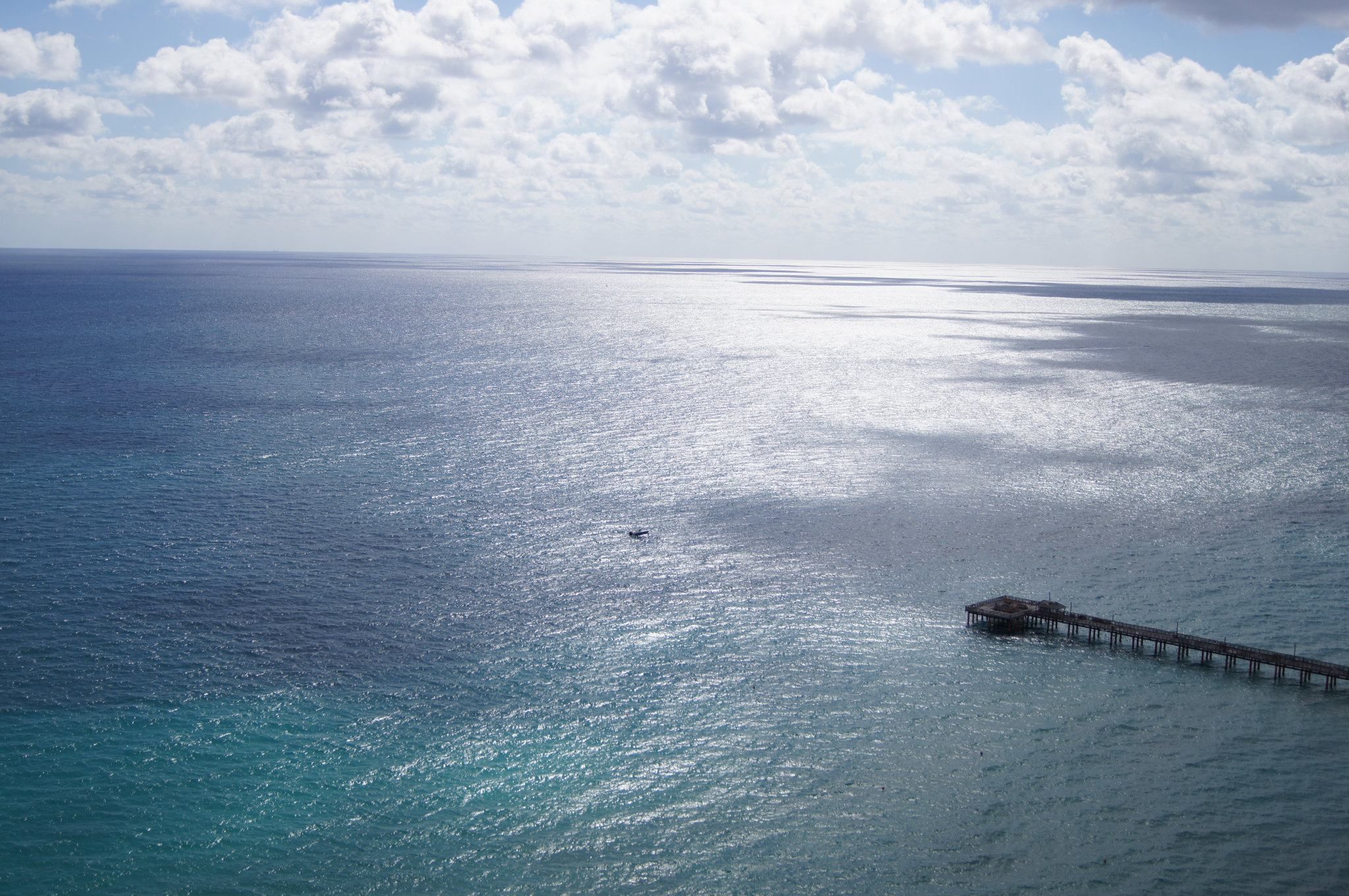
The view of the ocean off the coast of Sunny Isles Beach.

== International relations ==
=== Twin towns – Sister cities ===
Sunny Isles Beach, Florida is twinned with:

- Netanya, Israel
- Taormina, Italy
- Punta del Este, Uruguay
- Hengchun, Taiwan
