= Bolt Financial =

U.S. fintech company

Bolt Financial Inc.
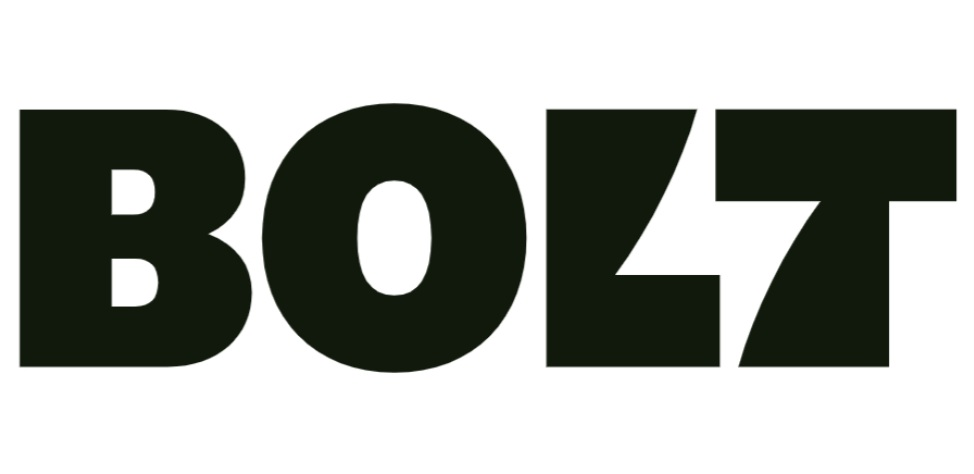
- Type: Private
- Industry: Fintech
- Founded: January 2014; 12 years ago in San Francisco
- Founders: Ryan Breslow; Eric Feldman
- Headquarters: San Francisco
- Area served: North America, Europe
- Key people: Ryan Breslow (Chairman); Maju Kuruvilla (CEO)
- Products: Bolt CheckoutOS; Bolt SSO Commerce; Commerce Everywhere
- Number of employees: 500+
- Website: boltapp.com

Bolt Financial Inc. (Bolt) is an American financial technology company that provides merchants with software to facilitate one-click online checkouts. It was founded in 2014 in San Francisco.

== History ==
Bolt was founded by Stanford University computer science students Ryan Breslow and Eric Feldman in 2014. Their goal was to simplify online checkout for consumers and help independent retailers compete with Amazon, which held the patent on one-click checkout until 2017. The company initially operated out of Breslow's dorm room.

In 2021, the company entered into partnerships with its first European clients and acquired Tipser, a technology company based in Sweden.

In December 2021, it raised $393 million, bringing Bolt's total funding to almost $1 billion. Its valuation was $11bn as of January 2022.

In February 2022, Maju Kuruvilla was named CEO. Kuruvilla remained in this role until 2024, when he was replaced with the head of sales, Justin Groom.

In February 2024, Bolt had under 700 employees, and was valued at approximately $300 million - a 97% decrease in price from 21 months prior.

Bolt announced in August 2024 that it was seeking a $450 million investment, raising capital from its lead investor The London Fund. Instead of cash, the fundraising partly involved The London Fund pledging up to $250m in influencer marketing credits. A publication by Axios revealed that, of the active portfolio companies listed on The London Fund website, some had never heard of The London Fund and others had ended business agreements.

In March 2025, Breslow returned to the CEO role, citing "unanimous approval" by the company's board.
