= Alonzo and Tracy Mourning Senior High Biscayne Bay Campus =

Location
- 2601 NE 151 Street; North Miami, Florida 33160; United States; 25.91696°N 80.14711°W

Information
- School type: Public, high school
- Established: 2009
- School district: Miami-Dade County Public Schools
- Principal: Christopher Shinn
- Teaching staff: 57.00 (FTE)
- Grades: 9-12
- Enrollment: 1,536 (2023–2024)
- Student to teacher ratio: 26.95
- Campus type: Suburban
- Colors: Blue; Silver
- Team name: Sharks
- Website: https://www.atmourningsharks.net/

Alonzo and Tracy Mourning Sr. High Biscayne Bay Campus is a secondary school in North Miami, Florida, United States which opened August 2009, located two blocks north of Florida International University's Biscayne Bay Campus. It is part of the Miami-Dade County Public Schools system. It was built to relieve overcrowding at three nearby high schools. The school is named after Alonzo Mourning, former player for the Miami Heat NBA basketball team, and his ex-wife Tracy.

The school serves all or portions of the cities of North Miami, North Miami Beach, Sunny Isles Beach, and Golden Beach.

== History ==
In 2009, the MDCPS school board voted for the name of the school, considering the Mournings and former Attorney General of the United States Janet Reno. The school was named after the Mournings due to their assistance to the area schools; some members of the Cuban community in Miami disliked Reno as they disagreed with her handling of the Elian Gonzalez case.

When the school opened, it relieved Krop High School, North Miami High School, and North Miami Beach High School. Its first graduation ceremony was held June 2012.

It was scheduled to open on Monday August 24, 2009. Initially it was to have about 600 students in grades 9 and 10 with grades 11 and 12 being phased in over the following two years, and 36 teachers. Sally Alayon was the school's first principal. The student population was planned to be around 1,600 in all. The Mournings visited during the first day of school dressed wearing the Mourning school uniform shirt.

Several residents of Aventura were unhappy that Aventura was not zoned to Mourning.

== Campus ==
The building is four stories tall.

== Curriculum ==
In 2009, the head of the school's English department, Melissa Keller, stated that Mourning's book, Resilience: Faith, Focus, Triumph, would be a part of the curriculum. It has not been a part of the curriculum in recent years. In 2018, ATM Social Studies Department instructor Molly Diallo was named the M-DCPS Teacher of the Year.

== School uniforms ==
Students are required to wear uniforms consisting of a polo with the school crest, and khakis or jeans.
