= Gwen Cooper (author) =

American novelist

Gwen Cooper is a New York City-based American novelist and author of the 2009 New York Times bestselling memoir Homer’s Odyssey: A Fearless Feline Tale, or How I Learned about Love and Life with a Blind Wonder Cat, a memoir about her life with an abandoned, eyeless cat that she rescued when he was three weeks old and subsequently named Homer.

In 2007, Simon & Schuster published Cooper's first novel, Diary of a South Beach Party Girl, inspired in part by Cooper's own experiences living and working in Miami's trendy South Beach in the late 1990s.

Cooper's third book, Love Saves the Day, a novel told from the point of view of a cat named Prudence, was published by Random House in January, 2013. Set in both New York City's Lower East Side during the 1970s/1980s and on the present-day Upper West Side, the novel takes its name from two inspirations: The Love Saves The Day vintage store located on Manhattan's East Village and from the “Love Saves The Day” gatherings of the early 1970s, well-known underground parties that were the proving ground of Dee-Jays and modern dance music.

== Early life and education ==
Cooper was born in Miami, Florida on October 24, 1971. She moved to New York City in 2001, where she currently lives with her husband, Laurence Lerman.

Cooper is active with numerous animal-welfare organizations and donates 10% of her royalties from Homer’s Odyssey to organizations that serve abused, abandoned, and disabled animals. In September 2010 she traveled to Raleigh, NC to present a $10,000 check to Blind Cat Rescue & Sanctuary.

Homer, Cooper's oldest cat and inspiration for Homer’s Odyssey: A Fearless Feline Tale, or How I Learned about Love and Life with a Blind Wonder Cat, was euthanized on August 21, 2013, at age 16. There have been reactions to his death worldwide, with thousands of fans showing their support on social media.

== Career ==
While living in Miami prior to moving to Manhattan, Cooper worked in non-profit administration for organizations including Youth Crime Watch of Dade County and Hands on Miami. She also produced the event launch of the truth anti-tobacco campaign in 1998 when the program first started.

In New York City, prior to the publication of her first book, she worked in creative services for AOL Time Warner's marketing department and as special projects manager at Wenner Media LLC, publisher of Rolling Stone and Us Weekly magazines.

=== Author ===
In August, 2009, Random House published Cooper's memoir Homer’s Odyssey: A Fearless Feline Tale, or How I Learned about Love and Life with a Blind Wonder Cat, written about her blind cat, Homer.

The memoir has its roots in a story that Cooper published on Salon.com in October, 2008. The story, entitled “Mucho Gato,” details an episode when Homer confronted an armed thief who attempted to rob Cooper in her Miami apartment one night in 2000. The “Mucho Gato” posting was one of the most popular posts on Salon.com's Open Salon blogging platform that month.

Homer’s Odyssey: A Fearless Feline Tale, or How I Learned about Love and Life with a Blind Wonder Cat debuted at the #14 spot on the New York Times Best Seller List upon publication and spent four weeks on the list. A paperback edition of the memoir was published in 2010 and also spent four weeks on the New York Times Best Seller List.

Homer’s Odyssey: A Fearless Feline Tale, or How I Learned about Love and Life with a Blind Wonder Cat has been published in 15 languages in some 22 countries around the world, including the Netherlands (Wonderkat), Germany (Homer und Ich), Italy (Omero Gatto Nero), France (L'odyssée d'Homère), Russia (Одиссея Гомера), Finland (Homer-kissan uskomaton elämä), Poland (Odyseja kota imieniem Homer), England, Korea, China, and Japan.

Homer’s Odyssey follows Cooper's life with Homer, the three-week-old abandoned blind kitten that she adopted in 1997 while living in Miami. Spanning 12 years, the memoir covers Cooper's experiences with Homer (and her two other cats, Vashti and Scarlett) as she endured a see-sawing professional and personal life. Sections of the memoir include Homer confronting an armed thief who attempts to rob Cooper in her Miami apartment, Cooper and her cats relocating from Miami to downtown Manhattan in New York City, and Cooper's efforts to return home to her cats who were trapped alone in an apartment near the World Trade Center following the terrorist attacks of 9/11. The final third of the memoir focuses on Cooper's attempts to acclimate her cats and the man she would eventually marry to living together in their Manhattan apartment.

Cooper has said that, “ultimately a special-needs pet is just like any other pet, and just as capable of loving you and living a wonderful life as any other animal,” and that she wrote Homer’s Odyssey in part to promote that message.

In January 2013, Random House published Cooper's second novel and third book, Love Saves the Day. Narrated from the perspective of a rescue tabby cat named Prudence, Love Saves the Day tells the story of a Lower East Side cat forced to move to the Upper West Side home of her owner's daughter, Laura, after her owner, Sarah, fails to return home from work one day. Although initially wary of each other, over the course of the novel Laura and Prudence form a strong bond that will change both their lives. Translation rights for Love Saves the Day have so far been sold in Germany, Italy, Russia, and Turkey.

In May 2013, Cooper launched a first-of-its-kind national book tour of no-kill animal shelters, rather than bookstores, in support of Love Saves the Day. Noting that “love does save the day for millions of abused and abandoned animals through the work of shelters and rescue groups,” and that “when you help animals, you help people, too,” Cooper selected over a dozen shelters for the tour on the strength of their innovative programs that also serve the human community—including the elderly, the disabled, disaster survivors, at-risk children, and more—as an extension of their work with rescue animals. The tour is sponsored by Arm & Hammer Ultra Last Clumping Cat Litter and Litter Genie, who are also making product donations to each of the shelters visited on the tour.

My Life in a Cat House: True Tales of Love, Laughter and Living with Five Felines is a memoir recounted in eight interconnected stories about Gwen Cooper's life with her well-known cat family, including Homer, Scarlett, Vashti and her two newest additions, Clayton and Fanny. It was published in hardcover by BenBella Books in October, 2018.

Homer and The Holiday Miracle is a short memoir by Gwen Cooper published by BenBella Books in October, 2018. Issued as a pocket-sized hardcover edition, the fifty-page memoir relates the story of how in December, 2012, Homer was diagnosed by veterinarians as having acute liver failure and “that he wouldn’t even make it to Christmas Eve.” It was a prognosis that mirrored the one that Homer had received fifteen years earlier, when doctors warned that a tiny, sightless kitten was unlikely to survive and probably wouldn't have much of a life even if he did. However, Homer went on to live comfortably and with high energy for more than another six months.
